= Josh Banderas =

American football player and coach (born 1995)

No. 52
- Position: Linebacker

Personal information
- Born: February 22, 1995 (age 31); Lincoln, Nebraska, U.S.
- Listed height: 6 ft 3 in (1.91 m)
- Listed weight: 240 lb (109 kg)

Career information
- High school: Lincoln Southwest
- College: Nebraska
- NFL draft: 2017: undrafted

Career history

Playing
- Denver Broncos (2017)*; Salt Lake Stallions (2019); Edmonton Football Team (2020)*; Philadelphia Stars (2022)
- * Offseason or practice squad member only

Coaching
- Oregon State (2021) Assistant coach

Career USFL statistics as of Week 10, 2022
- Games played: 6
- Tackles: 45
- Stats at Pro Football Reference

Josh Banderas (born February 22, 1995) is an American former professional football player who was a linebacker in the National Football League (NFL). He played college football for the Nebraska Cornhuskers.

== Early life and education ==
Banderas was born on February 22, 1995, in Lincoln, Nebraska. He attended Lincoln Southwest High School, where he was a two-way starter in football. Although originally focusing on linebacker in his first two years, he played running back as well in his final season. Despite playing in just five games as a sophomore, Banderas made 30 tackles. In his junior season, Banderas made a total of 127 tackles. As a senior, he ran 189 times for 1,237 and scored 18 touchdowns on offense, while making 119 tackles and two interceptions on defense. For his performance, Banderas was named honorary captain of the Omaha World-Herald and Lincoln Journal-Star all-state teams.

Banderas was a four-star prospect and committed to the University of Nebraska–Lincoln over offers from Iowa, Tulsa, Vanderbilt, and Kansas State, among others. As a freshman, he played in every game and was a starter in four games, making 28 tackles and two sacks. As a sophomore, he appeared in 12 games and started six, making 50 tackles. Against USC, Banderas made a career-high 14 tackles.

As a junior in 2015, Banderas was a starter at middle linebacker in nine games and ranked among the team's top tacklers with 61 stops. He led the school with 93 tackles as a senior and earned honorable mention all-conference honors.

== Professional career ==
After going unselected in the 2017 NFL draft, Banderas was signed as an undrafted free agent by the Denver Broncos. He was released in July.

After spending 2018 out of football, Banderas signed with the Salt Lake Stallions of the Alliance of American Football (AAF) in 2019. He appeared in eight games with the team and made seven tackles before the league folded.

In 2020, Banderas was signed by the Edmonton Football Team of the Canadian Football League (CFL), but the season was cancelled.

In 2021, Banderas played for the Generals of The Spring League.

Banderas was selected in the 21st round of the 2022 USFL draft by the Philadelphia Stars. He was transferred to the team's inactive roster on April 30, 2022. He was moved back to the active roster on May 5. Banderas finished the 2022 season with six games played, 45 tackles and 2.0 sacks.

== Coaching career ==
In 2021, Banderas was an assistant football coach at Oregon State University.

In 2025, Banderas started as an assistant football coach at Palmyra High School in Palmyra, NE.

== Personal life ==
His father Tom also played college football at Nebraska.
