= Terron Ward =

American football player (born 1992)

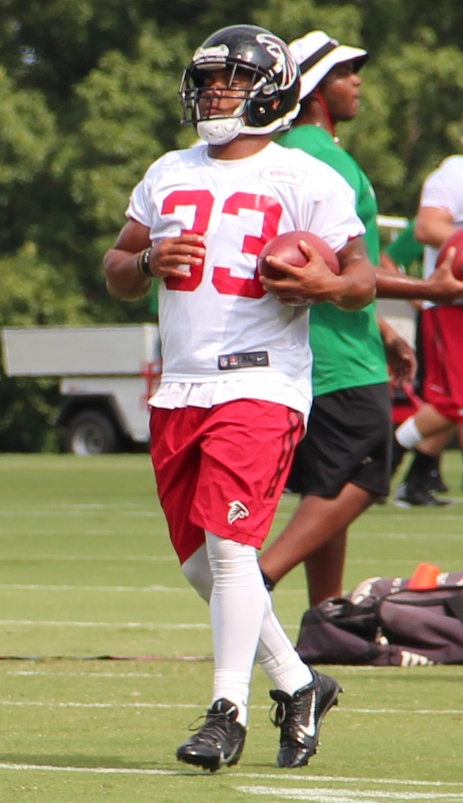
- Ward with the Atlanta Falcons in 2015

No. 28, 33
- Position: Running back

Personal information
- Born: February 15, 1992 (age 34); San Francisco, California, U.S.
- Listed height: 5 ft 7 in (1.70 m)
- Listed weight: 201 lb (91 kg)

Career information
- High school: De La Salle (Concord, California)
- College: Oregon State
- NFL draft: 2015: undrafted

Career history
- Atlanta Falcons (2015–2017); Arizona Hotshots (2019)*; Salt Lake Stallions (2019)
- * Offseason or practice squad member only

Career NFL statistics
- Rushing yards: 375
- Rushing average: 4.2
- Rushing touchdowns: 1
- Receptions: 13
- Receiving yards: 98
- Receiving touchdowns: 0
- Stats at Pro Football Reference

Terron Ward (born February 15, 1992) is an American former professional football player who was a running back for the Atlanta Falcons of the National Football League (NFL). He was signed by the Falcons as an undrafted free agent in 2015 after playing college football for the Oregon State Beavers. He also played for the Salt Lake Stallions of the Alliance of American Football (AAF).

== Early life ==
Ward attended and played high school football at De La Salle High School in Concord, California.

== College career ==
Ward attended and played college football at Oregon State University from 2011 to 2014. In the 2011 season, he had 211 rushing yards, one rushing touchdown, and 14 receptions for 76 receiving yards. In the 2012 season, he had 415 rushing yards, six rushing touchdowns, and 10 receptions for 79 receiving yards. In the 2013 season, he had 521 rushing yards, five rushing touchdowns, 34 receptions, 280 receiving yards, and three receiving touchdowns. In the 2014 season, he had 696 rushing yards, ten rushing touchdowns, and 29 receptions for 229 receiving yards.

== Professional career ==
Pre-draft measurables
Height	Weight	Arm length	Hand span	40-yard dash	10-yard split	20-yard split	20-yard shuttle	Three-cone drill	Vertical jump	Broad jump	Bench press
5 ft 5 7/8 in (1.67 m)	197 lb (89 kg)	28 in (0.71 m)	8 7/8 in (0.23 m)	4.56 s	1.60 s	2.64 s	4.29 s	7.20 s	29.5 in (0.75 m)	8 ft 11 in (2.72 m)	20 reps
All values are from Pro Day

=== Atlanta Falcons ===
Ward signed with the Atlanta Falcons as an undrafted rookie free agent in 2015. As a rookie, he played in 13 games while recording 95 yards on 29 carries with one rushing touchdown along with nine receptions for 73 yards.

On September 22, 2016, he was released by the Falcons and was signed to the practice squad the next day. On October 25, 2016, he was promoted from the practice squad to the active roster. The Falcons would have a successful season in 2016, which culminated in an appearance in Super Bowl LI. He finished the regular season with 31 carries for 151 rushing yards. Ward would be named an inactive for the Super Bowl, where the Falcons eventually lost to the New England Patriots by a score of 34–28 in overtime.

In 2017, Ward was the third running back on the team behind Devonta Freeman and Tevin Coleman, rushing for 129 yards in 14 games played.

=== Arizona Hotshots ===
Ward signed with the Arizona Hotshots of the Alliance of American Football (AAF) for the 2019 season, but was waived during final roster cuts on January 30, 2019.

=== Salt Lake Stallions ===
Ward was signed by the Salt Lake Stallions on March 12, 2019. The league ceased operations in April 2019.

== Personal life ==
Terron is the younger brother of former NFL safety and Super Bowl 50 champion T. J. Ward.
