= Anthony Denham =

American football player (born 1991)

No. 81
- Position: Tight end

Personal information
- Born: July 21, 1991 (age 35); Monterey Park, California, U.S.
- Listed height: 6 ft 4 in (1.93 m)
- Listed weight: 221 lb (100 kg)

Career information
- High school: Woodrow Wilson (Los Angeles)
- College: Utah
- NFL draft: 2014: undrafted

Career history
- Houston Texans (2014–2015); Philadelphia Eagles (2016–2017)*; Arizona Cardinals (2017)*; Philadelphia Eagles (2018)*; Salt Lake Stallions (2019)
- * Offseason or practice squad member only
- Stats at Pro Football Reference

Anthony Dion Denham Jr. (born July 21, 1991) is an American former professional football player who was a tight end in the National Football League (NFL). He played college football for the Utah Utes and was signed by the Houston Texans as an undrafted free agent in 2014.

== Early life ==
Denham is the son of Anthony Denham Sr. and Dana Lewis. He spent his high school years in foster care. At Woodrow Wilson high school in Los Angeles, California, he had four letters in football, two in basketball and one in track. He was the team's leading receiver and team captain in three years.

== College career ==
In his freshman year, at East Los Angeles College, he set school records for receiving yards and touchdowns with 1,186 yds and 16 touchdowns. In his sophomore 2010 season, his play got caught in a downward spiral, though he still finished second in the American Mountain Conference with 40 catches for 475 yds and 7 touchdowns. Even after his decline, he was still rated as a four star recruit by scout.com and rivals.com. After the 2010 season, he transferred to the University of Utah. In 2011, he redshirted, and in 2012 his play was limited, finishing with 11 catches for 135 yds. In 2013, his senior year, he started 10 games and had 24 catches for 291 yds and two touchdowns for the Utes.

=== College football statistics ===
Year	Team	Receptions	Yards	Avg	TD's
2012	Utah	11	135	12.3	0
2013	Utah	24	291	12.1	2
Career		35	426	12.2	2

== Professional career ==
Pre-draft measurables
Height	Weight	40-yard dash	10-yard split	20-yard split	20-yard shuttle	Three-cone drill	Vertical jump	Broad jump	Bench press
6 ft 4 1/2 in (1.94 m)	235 lb (107 kg)	4.77 s	1.65 s	2.76 s	4.56 s	7.38 s	32 1/2 in (0.83 m)	9 ft 5 in (2.87 m)	14 reps
Bench press, broad jump, shuttle, cone drill values from Pro Day; all other values from NFL Combine.

=== Houston Texans ===
Denham went undrafted in the 2014 NFL draft. He was signed by the Houston Texans, and called up from their practice squad on December 3, 2014. On September 3, 2016, he was released by the Texans.

=== Philadelphia Eagles (first stint) ===
On October 13, 2016, Denham was signed to the Eagles' practice squad. He was released on December 2, 2016 but was re-signed on December 13. He signed a reserve/future contract on January 2, 2017.

On September 1, 2017, Denham was waived by the Eagles.

=== Arizona Cardinals ===
On September 26, 2017, Denham was signed to the Arizona Cardinals' practice squad.

=== Philadelphia Eagles (second stint) ===
On August 28, 2018, Denham was signed by the Eagles. He was waived on September 1, 2018.

=== Salt Lake Stallions ===
In 2019, Denham joined the Salt Lake Stallions of the Alliance of American Football. The league ceased operations in April 2019.
