= Kameron Kelly =

American gridiron football player (born 1996)

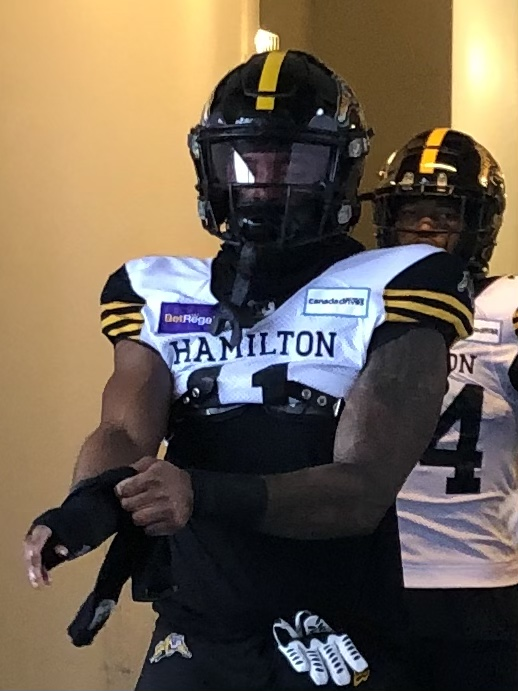
- Kelly with the Hamilton Tiger-Cats in 2021

Profile
- Position: Defensive back

Personal information
- Born: August 19, 1996 (age 30); Round Rock, Texas, U.S.
- Listed height: 6 ft 2 in (1.88 m)
- Listed weight: 192 lb (87 kg)

Career information
- High school: Wylie (Wylie, Texas)
- College: San Diego State (2014–2017)
- NFL draft: 2018: undrafted

Career history
- Dallas Cowboys (2018)*; San Diego Fleet (2019); Pittsburgh Steelers (2019); Hamilton Tiger-Cats (2021–2022); San Antonio Brahmas (2023); St. Louis Battlehawks (2024–2026)
- * Offseason or practice squad member only

Awards and highlights
- CFL All-Star (2022); CFL East All-Star (2022); UFL interception leader (2024); First-team All-Mountain West (2017)

Career NFL statistics
- Games played: 14
- Total tackles: 21
- Pass deflections: 1
- Interceptions: 1
- Stats at Pro Football Reference
- Stats at CFL.ca

Kameron Rashad Kelly (born August 19, 1996) is an American professional football defensive back. He played college football at San Diego State University.

== Early life ==
Kelly was born in Round Rock, Texas, and grew up in Wylie, Texas, where he attended Wylie High School.

As a senior, he posted 56-of-96 passes (58.3 percent) for 841 yards, 5 passing touchdowns, 86 carries for 568 rushing yards, 13 rushing touchdowns, 59 receptions for 950 yards, 11 receiving touchdowns, 4,000 all-purpose yards and 7 interceptions on defense. He led the team to a 9–5 overall record and an appearance in the 4A D1 Quarterfinals. He received 4A Region II District 13 Player of the Year and Academic all-state honors.

He also practiced basketball and track & field.

As a dual-threat quarterback, he was rated a two-star recruit by Rivals.com and committed to play college football at San Diego State.

== College career ==
As a true freshman, Kelly converted to safety and was a backup, before suffering a knee injury that was complicated by compartment syndrome, which forced him to miss the final 6 games of the season. He appeared in 6 games, registering one tackle, 5 kickoff returns for 131 yards (26.2-yard avg.) and one blocked punt.

As a sophomore, he started 13 games, collecting 58 tackles (3 for loss), 2 interceptions and 3 passes defensed. He missed the season opener for a violation of team rules. He had 8 tackles against Penn State University. He made 8 tackles against the University of Hawaiʻi at Mānoa. He had 9 tackles (one for loss) in the 2015 Hawaii Bowl.

As a junior, he returned to a backup role. He appeared in all 14 games, collecting 38 tackles, 5 interceptions, 6 passes defensed and 9 special teams tackles (tied for third on the team). He had 4 tackles, one interception and one pass defensed. He made 4 tackles and one interception against Fresno State University.

As a senior, after switching to cornerback, he started all 13 games and had the best season of his college career. He registered a career-high 68 tackles (5 for loss), two sacks, and two forced fumbles, 3 interceptions and 8 passes defensed. Both of his sacks were recorded in a game against then-19th ranked Stanford, in addition to six tackles, two of which were for a loss. That game earned him a Bronko Nagurski National Defensive Player of the Week award, as well as a Mountain West Defensive Player of the Week award. At the end of the season, he was named a first-team All-Mountain West selection. Finished tied for 10th in school history with 10 interceptions.

== Professional career ==
Pre-draft measurables
Height	Weight	Arm length	Hand span	Wingspan	40-yard dash	10-yard split	20-yard split	20-yard shuttle	Three-cone drill	Vertical jump	Broad jump	Bench press
6 ft 1 5/8 in (1.87 m)	204 lb (93 kg)	31 3/4 in (0.81 m)	8 7/8 in (0.23 m)	6 ft 2 5/8 in (1.90 m)	4.66 s	1.62 s	2.72 s	4.28 s	6.94 s	33.0 in (0.84 m)	10 ft 0 in (3.05 m)	9 reps
All values from NFL Combine

=== Dallas Cowboys ===
Kelly was signed as an undrafted free agent by the Dallas Cowboys after the 2018 NFL draft on April 30. He was released before the start of the season on September 1.

=== San Diego Fleet ===
On October 27, 2018, Kelly was signed by the San Diego Fleet of the Alliance of American Football for the 2019 AAF season. In early January, he was switched to the wide receiver position, and on January 30, it was announced that he made the final roster at that position. In practice before the week 3 game, head coach Mike Martz announced that Kelly would be moved back to cornerback due to injuries.

In week 5 against the Salt Lake Stallions, Kelly intercepted Stallions quarterback Josh Woodrum three times, one of which was returned for a 22-yard touchdown, as the Fleet won 27–25. He was eventually named the AAF Defensive Player of the Week.

=== Pittsburgh Steelers ===
After the AAF suspended football operations, Kelly signed with the Pittsburgh Steelers on April 8, 2019. Kelly made his debut with the Steelers in week 1 against the New England Patriots. In the game, Kelly made 7 tackles in the 33–3 loss. In week 5 against the Baltimore Ravens, Kelly recorded his first career interception off Lamar Jackson in the 26–23 loss.

On December 20, 2019, Kelly was arrested in Pittsburgh's southside after claims of threats towards police. He was waived by the Steelers later in the day. The charges were dropped by December 2020, and Kelly was fined half of a game salary by the NFL.

=== Hamilton Tiger-Cats ===
Kelly signed with the Hamilton Tiger-Cats of the CFL on February 17, 2021. He played in all 14 regular season games in 2021 where he had 36 defensive tackles, 10 pass deflections, one sack, and one interception.

=== San Antonio Brahmas ===
Kelly signed with the San Antonio Brahmas of the XFL in February 2023.

=== St. Louis Battlehawks ===
Kelly was selected by the St. Louis Battlehawks in the third round of the Super Draft portion of the 2024 UFL dispersal draft on January 15, 2024. He signed with the team on January 22. He re-signed with the team on August 26, 2024.
