= Branden Oliver =

American football player (born 1991)

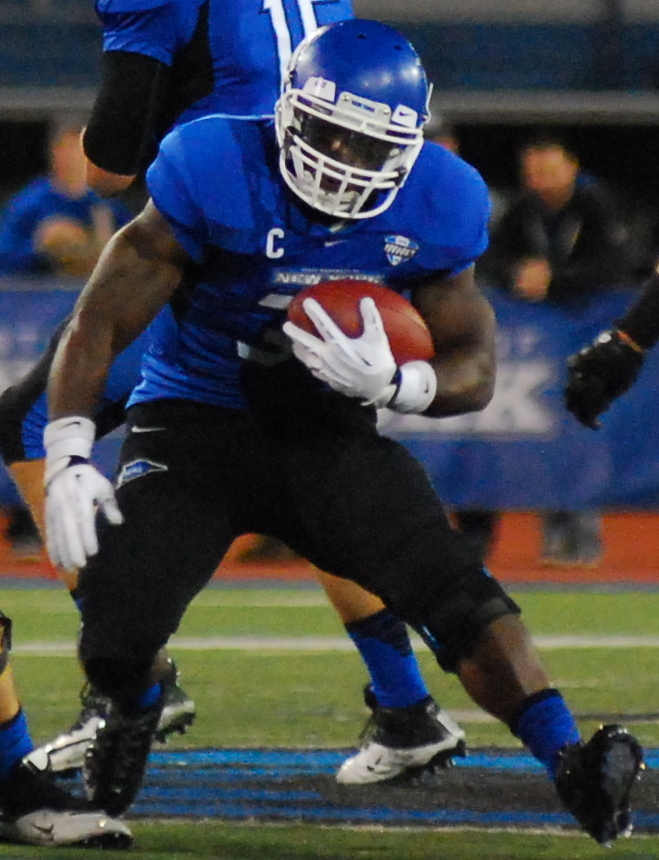
- Oliver playing for Buffalo in 2013

No. 32, 43
- Position: Running back

Personal information
- Born: May 7, 1991 (age 35); Miami, Florida, U.S.
- Listed height: 5 ft 8 in (1.73 m)
- Listed weight: 208 lb (94 kg)

Career information
- High school: Miami Southridge (Miami)
- College: Buffalo (2009–2013)
- NFL draft: 2014: undrafted

Career history
- San Diego / Los Angeles Chargers (2014–2017); Indianapolis Colts (2018)*; Salt Lake Stallions (2019); Hamilton Tiger-Cats (2020–2021)*
- * Offseason or practice squad member only

Awards and highlights
- First-team All-MAC (2011, 2013)

Career NFL statistics
- Rushing attempts: 226
- Rushing yards: 773
- Rushing touchdowns: 3
- Receptions: 55
- Receiving yards: 409
- Receiving touchdowns: 1
- Stats at Pro Football Reference

Branden Steven Oliver (born May 7, 1991) is an American former professional football player who was a running back for the San Diego / Los Angeles Chargers of the National Football League (NFL). He played college football for the Buffalo Bulls and signed with the San Diego Chargers as an undrafted free agent in 2014. He played in the NFL for the Chargers and in the Alliance of American Football (AAF) for the Salt Lake Stallions.

== Early life ==
Oliver was born in Miami, Florida, and attended Miami Southridge High School, where he played football and ran track. At Southridge, Oliver was a two-time captain and two time letter winner for head coach Rodney Hunter. As a senior, he rushed for 1,159 yards on 194 carries (6.0 ypc) and scored 15 touchdowns, and also had three catches for 61 yards and a score. He was selected to play in the North Florida vs. South Florida All-Star Classic and the Dade vs. Broward All-Star Game. Oliver has said that growing up in the competitive football environment of South Florida motivated him to perform to his full potential for fear of being overlooked. Buffalo was the only school to offer him a football scholarship out of high school.

In track & field, Oliver competed in sprinting, jumping and even throwing events. In sprints, he recorded a PR of 11.26 seconds in the 100-meter dash at the 2009 Sam Burley Hall of Fame Meet, where he placed 11th. In jumps, he cleared 13.5 meters in the triple jump. He was also a member of the 4 × 100 m (42.81s) relay squad.

== College career ==
Oliver played college football for the University of Buffalo from 2010 to 2013. He set the school record for career rushing yards, breaking a record previously held by James Starks. Starks had predicted that Oliver would break his record in 2009 when Starks was a senior and Oliver was still in his redshirt year. He ended his career with 4,049 career rushing yards and 33 rushing touchdowns.

=== 2010 season ===
Oliver earned the starting running back job as a redshirt-freshman during the preseason. His season-high rushing performance came in a road loss against the Baylor Bears in September, where he had 71 rushing yards.

=== 2011 season ===
Oliver finished his sophomore season gaining 1,395 yards and scoring 13 touchdowns on 306 carries. Oliver also caught the ball 38 times for 365 yards and no touchdowns. On October 8, the Bulls tailback gained 179 rushing yards and 43 receiving (221 total). He scored three times in a 38–37 win over the Ohio Bobcats. On November 19, Oliver ran 29 times, totaling a career-high 235 yards in a 51–10 win over the Akron Zips. In the final game of the season, Buffalo lost to the Bowling Green Falcons 42–28. However, Oliver surpassed NFL running back James Starks for the Bulls single season record for most carries, rushing yards and all-purpose yards. He also became the first Bulls running back to gain at least 100 yards eight times in a season.

Prior to the 2012 season, Oliver was named to the Doak Walker Watch List, the Walter Camp Watch List, and Maxwell Award Watch List.

=== 2012 season ===
Oliver suffered a grade-two MCL tear in a game against Kent State which caused him to miss five games and hindered him for four other games in the 2012 season. He recorded 821 yards on 148 carries and had five rushing touchdowns. In the seven games he played in, he went over 100 rushing yards four times. Buffalo lost four of the five games he missed and ended the season with a 4–8 record. In a 56–34 win over the Morgan State Bears, Oliver rushed for 238 yards on 25 carries and two touchdowns.

=== 2013 season ===
Oliver had 43 carries for 216 yards and a touchdown in a 32–3 victory over UMass. He rushed for 185 yards on 31 carries and a career-best four touchdowns in a 41–21 win over Kent State. He rushed for 249 yards and two touchdowns to lead Buffalo to a 30–3 victory over the Ohio Bobcats. He finished the season with 1,535 rushing yards, 15 rushing touchdowns, while averaging 5.0 yards a carry. Oliver personally had a stretch of seven games going over 100 rushing yards. The Buffalo Bulls finished the year with an 8–5 record and a bowl berth to the Famous Idaho Potato Bowl.

== Professional career ==
Pre-draft measurables
Height	Weight	40-yard dash	10-yard split	20-yard split	20-yard shuttle	Three-cone drill	Vertical jump	Broad jump	Bench press
5 ft 7 in (1.70 m)	208 lb (94 kg)	4.62 s	1.56 s	2.63 s	4.22 s	7.04 s	33.5 in (0.85 m)	9 ft 9 in (2.97 m)	26 reps
All values from Buffalo Pro Day

=== San Diego / Los Angeles Chargers ===
After Oliver went undrafted in the 2014 NFL draft, he agreed to a three-year contract with the San Diego Chargers.

On September 21, 2014, against the Buffalo Bills, Oliver recorded his first stats, running for 11 yards on 3 carries. On October 5, 2014, he had 19 carries for 114 yards, a rushing touchdown, four receptions for 68 yards and a receiving touchdown against the New York Jets, who had had the number one rushing defense in the league coming into the game. For that performance, Oliver was named Pepsi NFL Rookie of the Week. During that game, Donald Brown, then the starting running back for the Chargers, suffered a concussion. As a result, Oliver started in Week 6 against the Oakland Raiders. Against the Raiders, Oliver rushed again for over 100 yards and scored a last minute one-yard touchdown to help win the game. Oliver was named Pepsi Rookie of the Week for the second consecutive week. In the final game of the season, Oliver ran for 71 yards and scored a touchdown against the Kansas City Chiefs. Oliver finished the season leading all in rushing yards (582), attempts (160) and touchdowns (4).

Oliver only saw 31 carries for 108 rushing yards in eight games the 2015 season. His playing time was adversely affected by the Chargers' selection of Melvin Gordon in the first round of the 2015 NFL draft as well as a foot injury which caused him to miss eight weeks of the season.

On August 30, 2016, Oliver was placed on injured reserve after injuring his Achilles tendon in a preseason game.

Set to be a restricted free agent, Oliver was not tendered a contract by the Chargers in 2017, however on March 23, 2017, Oliver re-signed with the Chargers.

Overall, in the 2017 season, Oliver finished with 35 carries for 83 rushing yards in eight games.

=== Indianapolis Colts ===
On August 12, 2018, Oliver signed with the Indianapolis Colts. He was released on September 1, 2018.

=== Salt Lake Stallions ===
On January 12, 2019, Oliver signed with the Salt Lake Stallions of the Alliance of American Football, eventually making the final roster. He was placed on injured reserve on March 8, 2019. The league ceased operations in April 2019 and he was released from his contract. In four games played prior to injury, Oliver earned 210 yards on 54 rushes, caught six passes for 35 yards, and scored both a touchdown and a rushing two-point convert.

=== Hamilton Tiger-Cats ===
On April 13, 2020, Oliver signed with the Hamilton Tiger-Cats. After the CFL canceled the 2020 season due to the COVID-19 pandemic, Oliver chose to opt-out of his contract with the Tiger-Cats on August 31, 2020. He opted back in to his contract on January 12, 2021. On May 17, 2021, the Tiger-Cats announced that Oliver had retired.

== Personal life ==
His parents are Edwin Oliver and Alena Lee. Though he is the cousin of former NFL wide receiver Roscoe Parrish, he has attempted to but never been able to establish contact with him. Oliver is also a fervent Miami Heat fan and devout Christian – he points to the sky after touchdowns as a gesture to God. He is commonly referred to by the nicknames "The Little Guy," "Bo," "B.O." and "BoDozer." During the 2015 spring semester, Oliver returned to Buffalo to complete his bachelor's degree in sociology.
