= Joel Bouagnon =

American football player (born 1995)

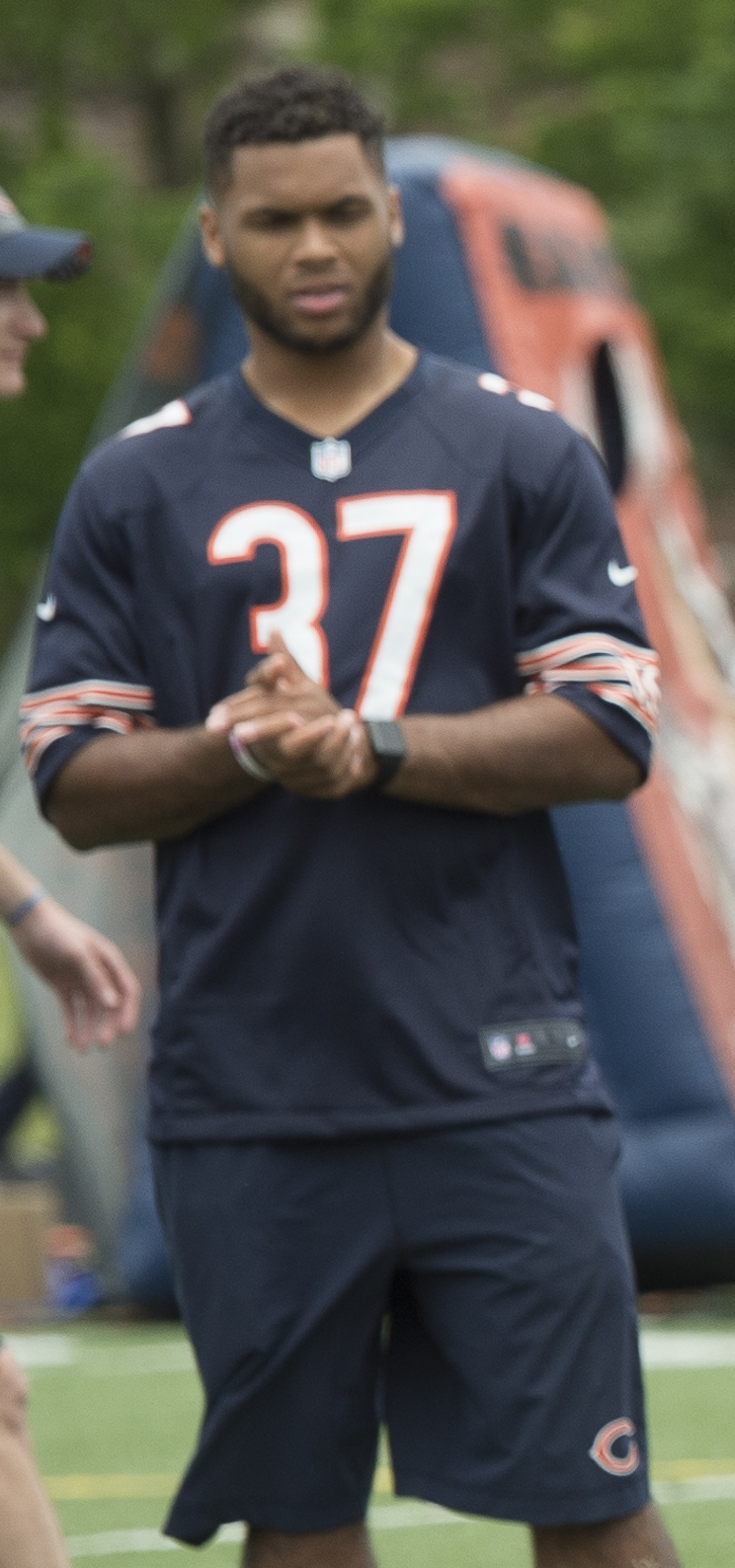
- Bouagnon with the Chicago Bears in 2017

No. 34
- Position: Running back

Personal information
- Born: March 28, 1995 (age 31); Pomona, California, U.S.
- Listed height: 6 ft 2 in (1.88 m)
- Listed weight: 230 lb (104 kg)

Career information
- High school: Aurora Christian Schools (Aurora, Illinois)
- College: Northern Illinois (2013–2017)
- NFL draft: 2017: undrafted

Career history
- Chicago Bears (2017)*; Green Bay Packers (2018)*; Detroit Lions (2018)*; New York Jets (2018)*; Salt Lake Stallions (2019)
- * Offseason or practice squad member only

Awards and highlights
- First-team All-MAC (2015); Second-team All-MAC (2016)
- Stats at Pro Football Reference

Joel Alexandre Balu Bouagnon (born March 28, 1995) is an American stock car racing pit crew member and former football running back. He played college football at Northern Illinois University, and signed with the Chicago Bears as an undrafted free agent in 2017.

As of 2025, he is the jackman on Denny Hamlin's No. 11 Toyota Camry XSE for Joe Gibbs Racing in the NASCAR Cup Series.

== High school and college career ==
Bouagnon played high school football first at Central High School in Burlington, Illinois and then transferred to Aurora Christian High School in Aurora, Illinois.

Bouagnon committed to Northern Illinois in 2013 and as a true freshman appeared in four games.

By 2015, Bouagnon earned a First-team All-Mac selection as a running back running for 1,285 yards and 18 Touchdowns. Bouagnon's 18 rushing touchdowns were tied for 10th most in the FBS for the 2015 season. Bouagnon also led the MAC league with 108 points scored and finished second in rushing yards along with six 100 yard rushing games for the season.

In 2016 Bouagnon was selected for the Second-team All-MAC as a running back with 885 rushing yards and 8 touchdowns.

== Professional career ==
Pre-draft measurables
Height	Weight	40-yard dash	10-yard split	20-yard split	20-yard shuttle	Three-cone drill	Vertical jump	Broad jump	Bench press
6 1 1/4	230 lb (104 kg)	4.66 s	1.56 s	2.53 s	4.42 s	6.90 s	34 in (0.86 m)	10 ft 2 in (3.10 m)	20 reps
All values are from Pro Day

=== Chicago Bears ===
Bouagnon signed with the Chicago Bears as an undrafted free agent on May 11, 2017. On August 3, 2017, he was waived/injured by the Bears and placed on injured reserve. He was released on August 9, 2017.

=== Green Bay Packers ===
On January 10, 2018, Bouagnon signed a reserve/future contract with the Green Bay Packers. He was waived on September 1, 2018, and was signed to the practice squad the next day. He was released on October 9, 2018.

=== Detroit Lions ===
On October 24, 2018, Bouagnon was signed to the Detroit Lions practice squad, but was released three days later.

=== New York Jets ===
On December 11, 2018, Bouagnon was signed to the New York Jets practice squad.

=== Salt Lake Stallions ===
On January 12, 2019, Bouagnon signed with the Salt Lake Stallions of the Alliance of American Football. The league ceased operations in April 2019.

== NASCAR ==
In 2020, Bouagnon began working in NASCAR as a pit crew member.
