= Rashad Ross =

American football player (born 1990)

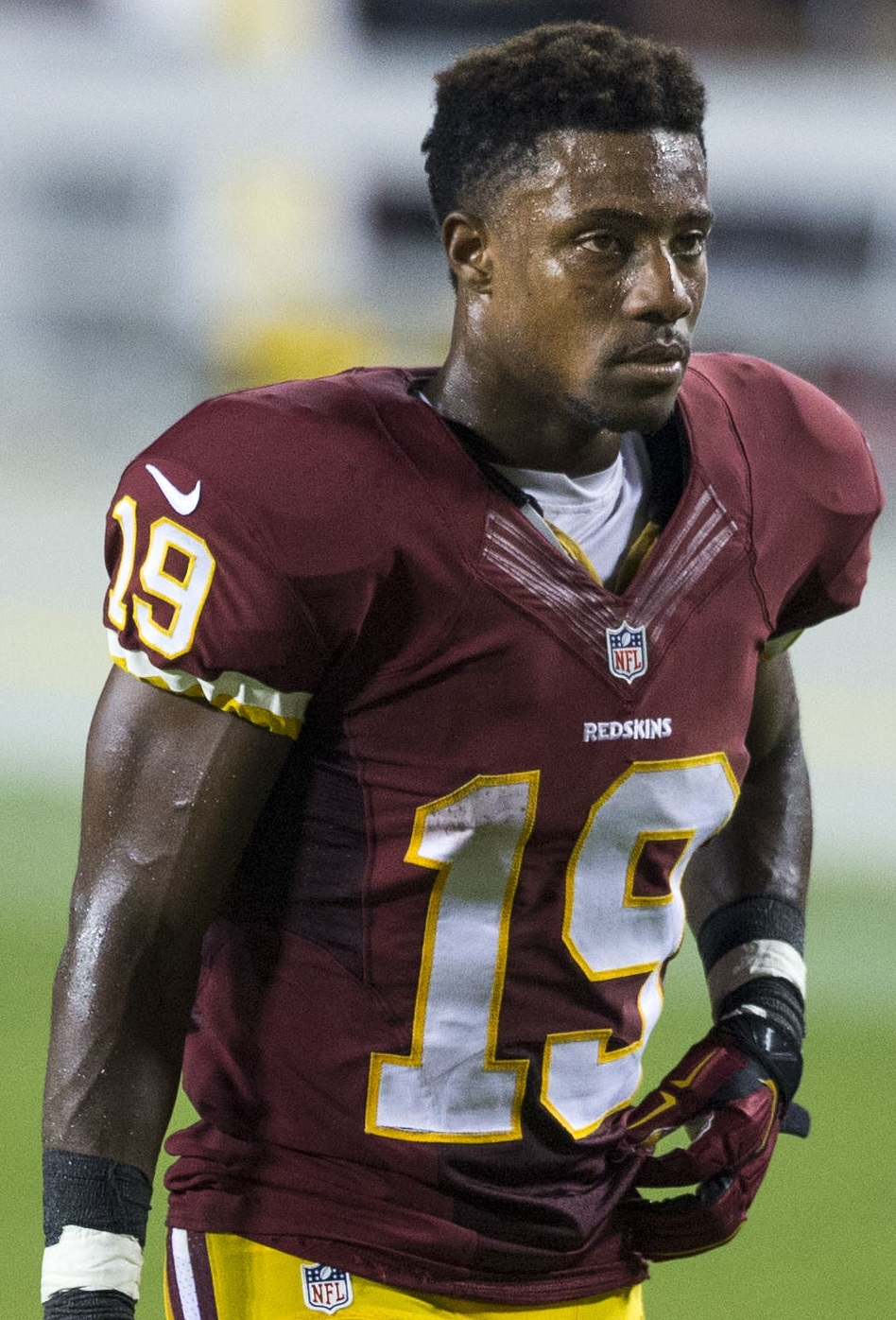
- Ross with the Washington Redskins in 2015

No. 13, 19
- Position: Wide receiver

Personal information
- Born: February 2, 1990 (age 36); Vallejo, California, U.S.
- Listed height: 6 ft 0 in (1.83 m)
- Listed weight: 180 lb (82 kg)

Career information
- High school: Vallejo
- College: Arizona State
- NFL draft: 2013: undrafted

Career history
- Tennessee Titans (2013)*; Kansas City Chiefs (2013–2014)*; Washington Redskins (2014)*; Chicago Bears (2014); Washington Redskins (2014–2016); Detroit Lions (2016)*; San Francisco 49ers (2017)*; Buffalo Bills (2017)*; Arizona Cardinals (2017–2018)*; Arizona Hotshots (2019); Carolina Panthers (2019)*; Los Angeles Wildcats (2020)*; DC Defenders (2020); Montreal Alouettes (2021); San Diego Strike Force (2022)
- * Offseason or practice squad member only

Career NFL statistics
- Receptions: 9
- Receiving yards: 192
- Return yards: 812
- Total touchdowns: 3
- Stats at Pro Football Reference

Rashad Ahmad Ross (born February 2, 1990) is an American former professional football player who was a wide receiver in the National Football League (NFL) and Canadian Football League (CFL). He played college football for the Arizona State Sun Devils and was signed as an undrafted free agent by the Tennessee Titans following the 2013 NFL draft.

== Early life ==
Ross attended and played high school football at Vallejo High School.

== College career ==
Ross played college football for Butte College in 2010, and later transferred to Arizona State University to play for the Sun Devils from 2011 to 2012 under head coaches Dennis Erickson and Todd Graham. In the 2011 season, he handled kick return duties and had 18 receptions for 254 receiving yards and one receiving touchdown. The one touchdown was part of a five-reception, 108-yard performance in a 47–38 loss to California. In the 2012 season, his role in the offense expanded and he had 37 receptions for 610 receiving yards and six receiving touchdowns to go along with 100-yard kickoff return touchdown in a 51–17 victory over Colorado. Two of his memorable games in 2012 were a 79-yard, two-touchdown performance in a 46–7 victory over Washington State and a 139-yard, three-touchdown performance in a 62–28 victory over Navy in the 2012 Fight Hunger Bowl.

=== Collegiate statistics ===
Year	School	Conf	Pos	G	Rec	Yds	Avg	TD
2011	Arizona State	Pac-12	WR	13	18	254	14.1	1
2012	Arizona State	Pac-12	WR	13	37	610	16.5	6
Career	Arizona State				55	864	15.7	7

== Professional career ==
Pre-draft measurables
Height	Weight	Arm length	Hand span	40-yard dash	10-yard split	20-yard split	20-yard shuttle	Three-cone drill	Vertical jump	Broad jump	Bench press
5 ft 11 in (1.80 m)	179 lb (81 kg)	30 1/2 in (0.77 m)	8 5/8 in (0.22 m)	4.36 s	1.57 s	2.56 s	4.37 s	7.19 s	35.0 in (0.89 m)	9 ft 7 in (2.92 m)	12 reps
All values from Pro Day

=== Tennessee Titans ===
After going unselected in the 2013 NFL draft, Ross was signed by the Tennessee Titans on April 30, 2013. After being released for final roster cuts, the team signed him to their practice squad.

=== Kansas City Chiefs ===
On November 12, 2013, Ross was signed to the practice squad of the Kansas City Chiefs. He was released on May 12, 2014.

=== Washington Redskins (first stint) ===
Ross signed with the Washington Redskins on May 23, 2014. He was waived on August 26, 2014.

=== Chicago Bears ===
Ross signed with the practice squad of the Chicago Bears on September 1, 2014. He was released by the team on September 30.

=== Washington Redskins (second stint) ===
Ross was signed to the Redskins' practice squad on October 15, 2014. Ross was released from the practice squad on November 17, 2014, but was re-signed on December 8. He signed a futures contract on December 29.

After working out with fellow wide receiver, DeSean Jackson, during the 2015 offseason, Ross had an outstanding preseason performance. After all four preseason games, Ross recorded 25 receptions for 266 receiving yards and four touchdowns, leading the league in all three categories. After final roster cuts, Ross remained on the active 53-man roster as a reserve receiver.

He became the team's kickoff returner in 2015. Quickly into action against the New York Giants on Thursday Night Football, Ross recorded his first two career receptions, as well as his first touchdown off of a 101-yard kick return. In Week 4 against the Philadelphia Eagles, he had a 43-yard reception in the third quarter. He recovered a punt blocked by safety Jeron Johnson in the endzone against the New York Jets in Week 6, scoring his second career touchdown. In the last game of the regular season against the Dallas Cowboys, Ross recorded a 71-yard touchdown reception from backup quarterback Colt McCoy, the first receiving touchdown of his career.

In the 2016 season, Ross was active for five games recording one catch for 8 yards. He was released on December 22, 2016.

=== Detroit Lions ===
On December 24, 2016, Ross was signed to the Detroit Lions' practice squad.

=== San Francisco 49ers ===
On January 19, 2017, Ross signed a reserve/future contract with the San Francisco 49ers. He was released on June 1, 2017.

=== Buffalo Bills ===
On June 6, 2017, Ross signed with the Buffalo Bills. On August 29, 2017, he was released.

=== Arizona Cardinals ===
On December 19, 2017, Ross signed with the Arizona Cardinals' practice squad. He signed a reserve/future contract with the team on January 2, 2018.

On August 14, 2018, Ross was released.

=== Arizona Hotshots ===
In late 2018, Ross signed with the Arizona Hotshots of the Alliance of American Football. In the season opener against the Salt Lake Stallions, he caught 5 receptions for 103 yards and 2 touchdowns. When the AAF was suspended, Ross had 36 receptions for 583 yards and a league-leading seven touchdowns. In addition, he had AAF’s highest receiving grade from Pro Football Focus.

=== Carolina Panthers ===
On April 4, 2019, Ross signed with the Carolina Panthers. He was waived during final roster cuts on August 30, 2019.

=== Los Angeles Wildcats ===
In October 2019, Ross was selected by the Los Angeles Wildcats in the 2020 XFL draft.

=== DC Defenders ===
Ross was traded to the DC Defenders in exchange for wide receiver Tre McBride on January 12, 2020. In his XFL debut, Ross recorded two receptions for 52 yards and a touchdown against the Seattle Dragons. During the five games played during the COVID-19 pandemic shortened 2020 season, Ross caught 12 passes for 193 yards and one touchdown. He had his contract terminated when the league suspended operations on April 10, 2020.

=== Montreal Alouettes ===
Ross signed with the Montreal Alouettes of the CFL on June 9, 2021 but was released during the season on October 21, 2021.

=== San Diego Strike Force ===
On March 24, 2022, Ross signed with the San Diego Strike Force of the Indoor Football League (IFL). On December 8, 2022, Ross was released.
