= Taylor Bertolet =

American football player (born 1993)

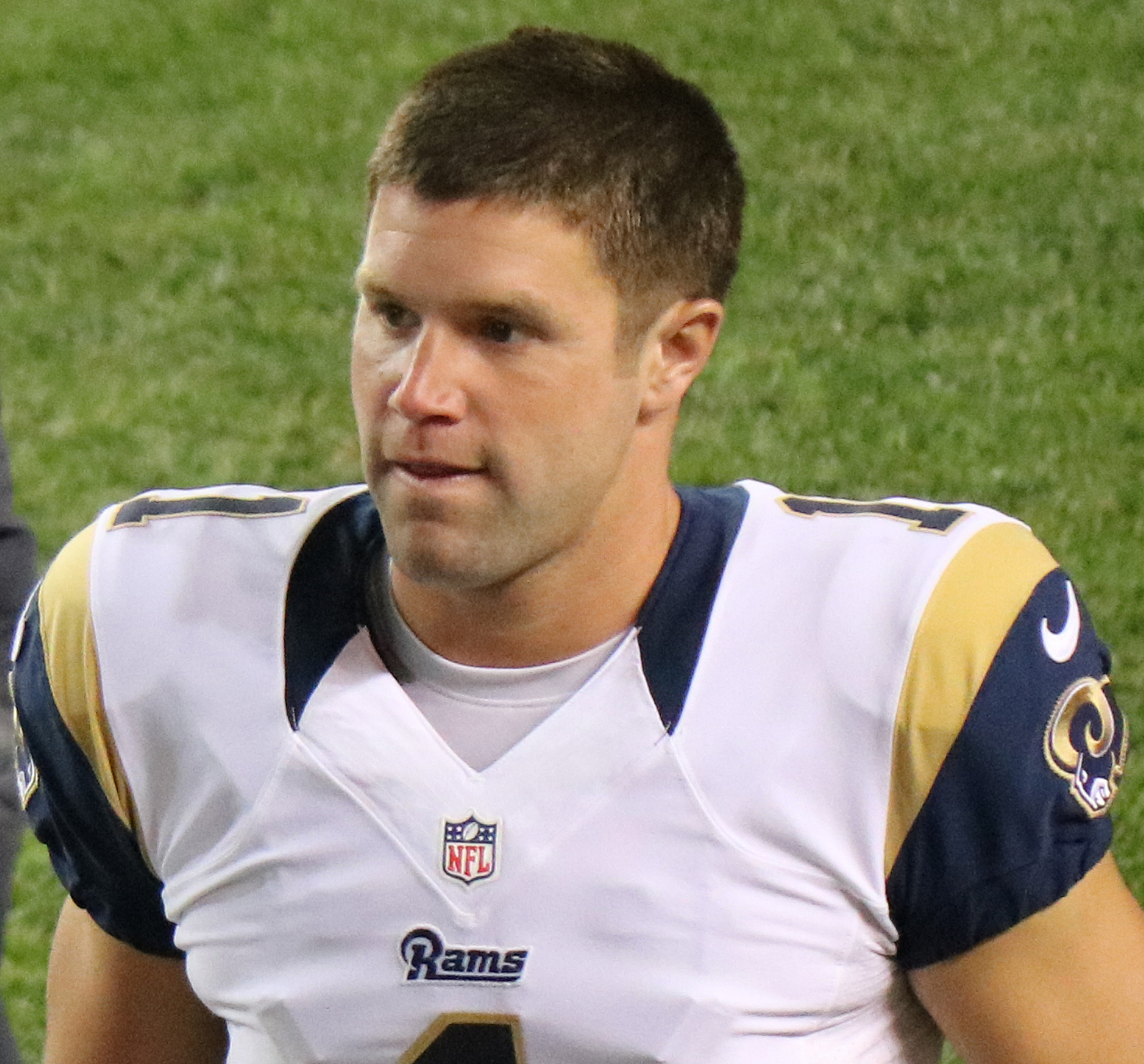
- Bertolet with the Los Angeles Rams in 2016

No. 12
- Position: Placekicker

Personal information
- Born: October 24, 1992 (age 34); Reading, Pennsylvania, U.S.
- Listed height: 5 ft 9 in (1.75 m)
- Listed weight: 188 lb (85 kg)

Career information
- High school: Exeter Township (Reading)
- College: Texas A&M
- NFL draft: 2016: undrafted

Career history
- Los Angeles Rams (2016)*; Denver Broncos (2018)*; New York Jets (2018)*; Salt Lake Stallions (2019); Denver Broncos (2019)*; New York Jets (2019)*; Carolina Panthers (2020)*; Minnesota Vikings (2020)*; Hamilton Tiger-Cats (2021); New Orleans Breakers (2022); Carolina Panthers (2022)*; Los Angeles Chargers (2022)
- * Offseason or practice squad member only

Awards and highlights
- Second-team All-SEC (2015)

Career NFL statistics
- Field goals made: 3
- Field goals attempted: 3
- Field goal %: 100
- Points scored: 9
- Longest field goal: 28
- Touchbacks: 5
- Stats at Pro Football Reference

Taylor Bertolet (born October 24, 1992) is an American former professional football player who was a placekicker in the National Football League (NFL). He played college football for the Texas A&M Aggies and holds a school record for most extra points in a single season.

== College career ==
In 2012, Bertolet and quarterback Johnny Manziel became the first freshmen to surpass 100 points in a season. Bertolet kicked for a total of a career-high 106 points including 13 field goals and a school record 67 extra points. Bertolet kicked a season-long 54-yard field goal against Louisiana Tech.

Bertolet was mainly the Aggies kickoff specialist for the 2013 and 2014 season, losing placekicking job to Josh Lambo.

In 2015, Bertolet kicked a career-high 22 field goals on 31 attempts for a career-high 71% field goal percentage. Bertolet kicked a career-long 55-yard field goal against Mississippi State. Bertolet tied Southeastern Conference and school records by making six field goals against Vanderbilt. He tied Alan Smith's six field goals in 1983 against Arkansas State.

== Professional career ==
=== Los Angeles Rams ===
After going undrafted in the 2016 NFL draft, Bertolet signed with the Los Angeles Rams on May 4, 2016. On August 30, 2016, he was released by the Rams.

=== Denver Broncos (first stint) ===
On March 21, 2018, Bertolet signed with the Denver Broncos. On April 30, 2018, he was waived by the Broncos.

=== New York Jets (first stint) ===
On May 7, 2018, Bertolet was signed by the New York Jets. He was waived by the Jets on September 1, 2018, after losing the starting kicking job to Jason Myers.

=== Salt Lake Stallions ===
Before the 2019 season, Bertolet signed with the Salt Lake Stallions of the Alliance of American Football.

=== Denver Broncos (second stint) ===
After the AAF filed for bankruptcy, Bertolet re-signed with the Denver Broncos on April 29, 2019. He was waived on July 23, 2019.

=== New York Jets (second stint) ===
On August 11, 2019, Bertolet was signed by the New York Jets after Chandler Catanzaro retired during preseason. He was waived by the Jets on September 1, 2019.

=== Carolina Panthers (first stint) ===
On October 24, 2020, Bertolet was signed to the Carolina Panthers practice squad. He was released on November 2, 2020, and re-signed to the practice squad on November 7. He was released again on November 10, and re-signed to the practice squad again on November 14. He was released on November 16, and re-signed again on November 21. Bertolet was released a fourth time on November 24, 2020, but re-signed four days later. He was released again on December 1, 2020.

=== Minnesota Vikings ===
On December 19, 2020, Bertolet was signed to the Minnesota Vikings' practice squad. His practice squad contract with the team expired after the season on January 11, 2021.

=== Hamilton Tiger-Cats ===
Bertolet signed with the Hamilton Tiger-Cats on June 29, 2021. He was released on November 15, 2021.

=== New Orleans Breakers ===
Bertolet signed with the New Orleans Breakers of the United States Football League on May 5, 2022.

=== Carolina Panthers (second stint) ===
Bertolet signed to the Carolina Panthers' practice squad on September 9, 2022. He was released on September 13.

=== Los Angeles Chargers ===
Bertolet was signed to the Los Angeles Chargers practice squad on October 6, 2022. On October 9, he was elevated to the active roster, and made his first 3 NFL field goals that day, over 6 years from the start of his pro career.
