= Jordan Leslie =

American football player (born 1991)

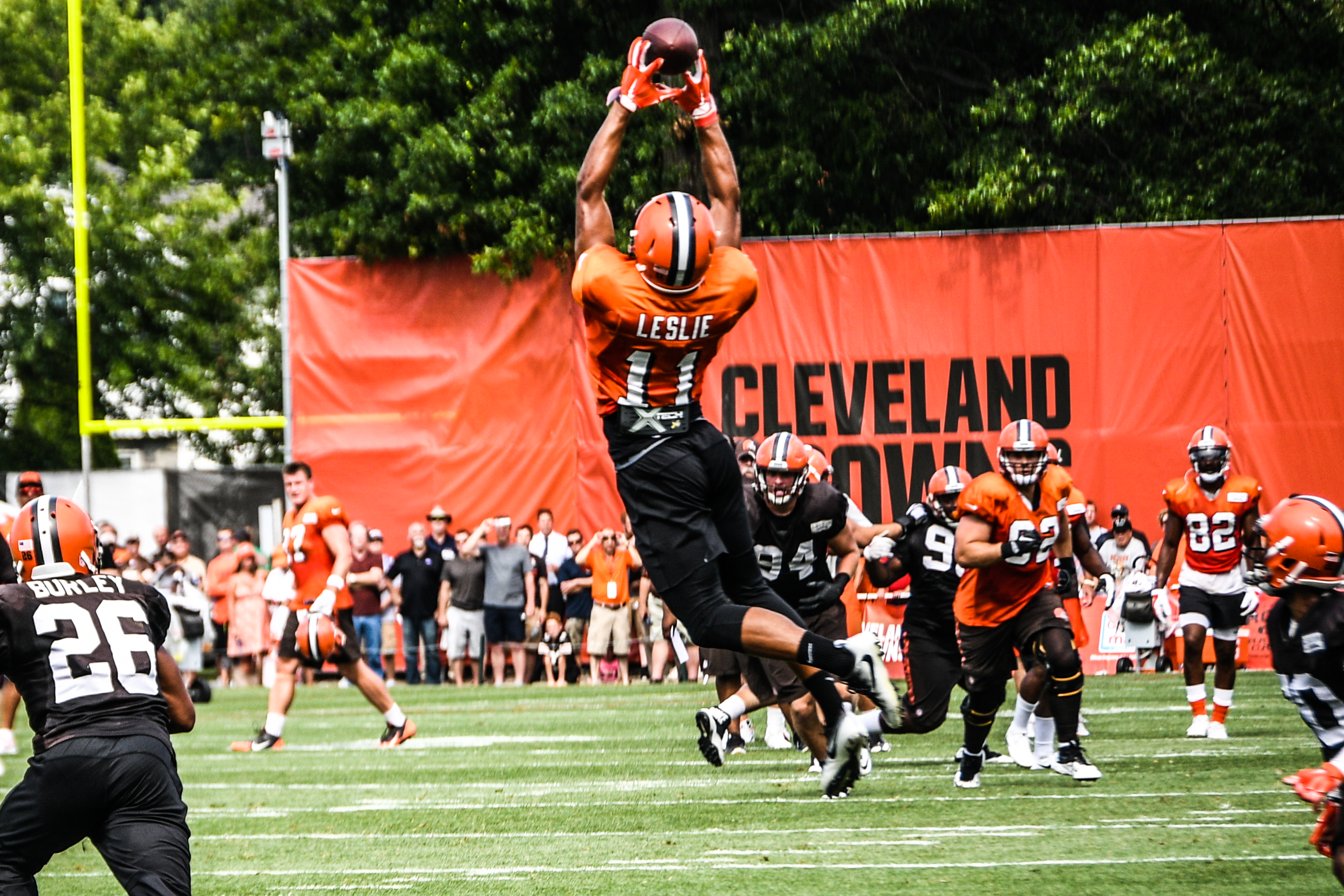
- Leslie in 2017 training camp

No. 11, 19
- Position: Wide receiver

Personal information
- Born: October 31, 1991 (age 35); Houston, Texas, U.S.
- Listed height: 6 ft 2 in (1.88 m)
- Listed weight: 209 lb (95 kg)

Career information
- High school: Tomball (Tomball, Texas)
- College: BYU
- NFL draft: 2015: undrafted

Career history
- Minnesota Vikings (2015)*; Jacksonville Jaguars (2015)*; Atlanta Falcons (2015–2016)*; Tennessee Titans (2016)*; Cleveland Browns (2016–2017); Denver Broncos (2017–2018)*; Salt Lake Stallions (2019); Hamilton Tiger-Cats (2019)*
- * Offseason or practice squad member only

Career NFL statistics
- Receptions: 1
- Receiving yards: 26
- Stats at Pro Football Reference

Jordan Leslie (born October 31, 1991) is an American former professional football player who was a wide receiver in the National Football League (NFL), Alliance of American Football (AAF), and Canadian Football League (CFL). He played college football at BYU in 2014 and for UTEP in 2012 and 2013. He was signed by the Minnesota Vikings after going undrafted in the 2015 NFL draft.

== Early life ==
Leslie attended Tomball High School in Tomball, Texas, where he was a three-year varsity letterwinner for coach Tommy Kaiser. He switched from quarterback to wide receiver for his sophomore year and responded by tallying 54 receptions for 770 yards and five touchdowns, earning All-Region Newcomer of the Year. He made 54 catches for 1,014 yards (18.9 avg.) with 10 TDs his junior season while also adding five punt returns for 49 yards (9.8 avg.) and seven kickoff returns for 186 yards (26.6 avg.). As a senior, he compiled 55 catches for 742 yards (13.5 avg.) with nine touchdowns, and also had eight punt returns for 113 yards (14.1 avg.) and seven kickoff returns for 132 yards (18.9 avg.). He was also a three-time Academic All-District pick and also made the Academic All-State team.

Also a standout in basketball and track & field, Leslie was a multiple All-District choice in basketball and a runner-up finisher in the high jump at the 2009 regional meet with a leap of 2.03 meters (6 feet, 8 inches). He also had personal-best leaps of 6.47 meters (21 feet, 2.25 inches) in the long jump and 13.37 meters (43 feet, 10.5 inches) in the triple jump.

In his freshman year, Leslie befriended future professional basketball player Jimmy Butler. They played together on the basketball team. Since Butler was homeless at the time, Leslie's family allowed Butler to live with them.

== Professional career ==
Pre-draft measurables
Height	Weight	40-yard dash	10-yard split	20-yard split	20-yard shuttle	Three-cone drill	Vertical jump	Broad jump	Bench press
6 ft 2 in (1.88 m)	204 lb (93 kg)	4.44 s	1.61 s	2.61 s	4.08 s	6.87 s	38 in (0.97 m)	10 ft 10 in (3.30 m)	18 reps
All values from Pro Day

=== Minnesota Vikings ===
Leslie was signed by the Minnesota Vikings on May 2, 2015, after going undrafted. He was cut by the Vikings on August 31, 2015.

=== Jacksonville Jaguars ===
Leslie signed with the Jacksonville Jaguars' practice squad on October 21, 2015.

=== Atlanta Falcons ===
Leslie signed with the Atlanta Falcons' practice squad on December 15, 2015. On August 27, 2016, Leslie was waived by the Falcons.

=== Tennessee Titans ===
Leslie was signed to the Tennessee Titans' practice squad on September 27, 2016. He was released by the team on October 3.

=== Cleveland Browns ===
On October 18, 2016, Leslie was signed to the Browns' practice squad. He signed a reserve/future contract with the Browns on January 5, 2017.

On September 2, 2017, Leslie was waived by the Browns. He was re-signed to the practice squad on September 19, 2017. He was promoted to the active roster on September 22, 2017. He caught his first career pass in Week 3, a one-handed leaping grab for 26 yards. He was waived/injured on October 4, 2017, and placed on injured reserve. He was released on October 11, 2017.

=== Denver Broncos ===
On December 27, 2017, Leslie was signed to the Denver Broncos' practice squad. He signed a reserve/future contract with the Broncos on January 1, 2018.

On August 31, 2018, Leslie was waived by the Broncos.

=== Salt Lake Stallions ===
On December 21, 2018, Leslie signed with the Salt Lake Stallions of the Alliance of American Football.

=== Hamilton Tiger-Cats ===
After the AAF ceased operations in April 2019, Leslie signed with the Hamilton Tiger-Cats of the Canadian Football League on May 23, 2019. He asked for his release on May 28.
