= Jeremiah Poutasi =

American football player (born 1994)

Profile
- Position: Offensive lineman

Personal information
- Born: August 7, 1994 (age 32); Daly City, California, U.S.
- Listed height: 6 ft 5 in (1.96 m)
- Listed weight: 330 lb (150 kg)

Career information
- High school: Desert Pines (Las Vegas, Nevada)
- College: Utah
- NFL draft: 2015: 3rd round, 66th overall pick

Career history
- Tennessee Titans (2015); Jacksonville Jaguars (2016–2017); Los Angeles Rams (2017)*; Denver Broncos (2017–2018)*; Salt Lake Stallions (2019); Arizona Cardinals (2019)*; Las Vegas Raiders (2021)*; Saskatchewan Roughriders (2023)*
- * Offseason or practice squad member only

Awards and highlights
- Second-team All-Pac-12 (2014)

Career NFL statistics
- Games played: 12
- Games started: 8
- Stats at Pro Football Reference

Cedrick Jeremiah Poutasi (born August 7, 1994) is an American professional football offensive lineman. He played college football at Utah.

== Early life ==
Poutasi attended Desert Pines High School in Las Vegas, Nevada. He was rated by Rivals.com as a four-star recruit. He committed to the University of Utah to play college football.

== College career ==
Poutasi attended Utah from 2012 to 2014. He took over as a starter his freshman season and remained a starter through his junior season.

After his junior season, Poutasi entered the 2015 NFL draft.

== Professional career ==
=== Tennessee Titans ===
Poutasi was selected with the 66th overall pick in the third round of the 2015 NFL Draft by the Tennessee Titans. On September 2, 2016, he was released by the Titans as part of final roster cuts.

=== Jacksonville Jaguars ===
On September 5, 2016, Poutasi was signed to the practice squad of the Jacksonville Jaguars. He was promoted to the active roster on November 18, 2016. He was placed on injured reserve on December 20, 2016, after suffering an ankle injury in Week 15.

On September 3, 2017, Poutasi was waived by the Jaguars and was re-signed to the practice squad. He was released on September 20, 2017.

=== Los Angeles Rams ===
On November 15, 2017, Poutasi was signed to the Los Angeles Rams' practice squad, but was released six days later.

=== Denver Broncos ===
On December 5, 2017, Poutasi was signed to the Denver Broncos' practice squad. He signed a reserve/future contract with the Broncos on January 1, 2018.

On September 1, 2018, Poutasi was waived by the Broncos.

=== Salt Lake Stallions ===
In January 2019, Poutasi joined the Salt Lake Stallions of the Alliance of American Football (AAF).

=== Arizona Cardinals ===
After the AAF suspended football operations, Poutasi signed with the Arizona Cardinals on April 8, 2019, but was waived a week later.

=== The Spring League ===
Poutasi was selected by the Jousters of The Spring League during its player selection draft on October 11, 2020.

=== Las Vegas Raiders ===
On August 4, 2021, Poutasi signed with the Las Vegas Raiders. He was waived on August 31, 2021, and re-signed to the practice squad the next day. After the Raiders were eliminated in the 2021 Wild Card round of the playoffs, he signed a reserve/future contract on January 17, 2022. He was waived on February 28, 2022.

=== Saskatchewan Roughriders ===
On November 24, 2022, Poutasi signed with the Saskatchewan Roughriders of the Canadian Football League (CFL). He was placed on the reserve/suspended list on May 14, 2023, and remained there until February 11, 2025, when he became a free agent at the end of his CFL contract.
