= Ciante Evans =

American gridiron football player (born 1992)

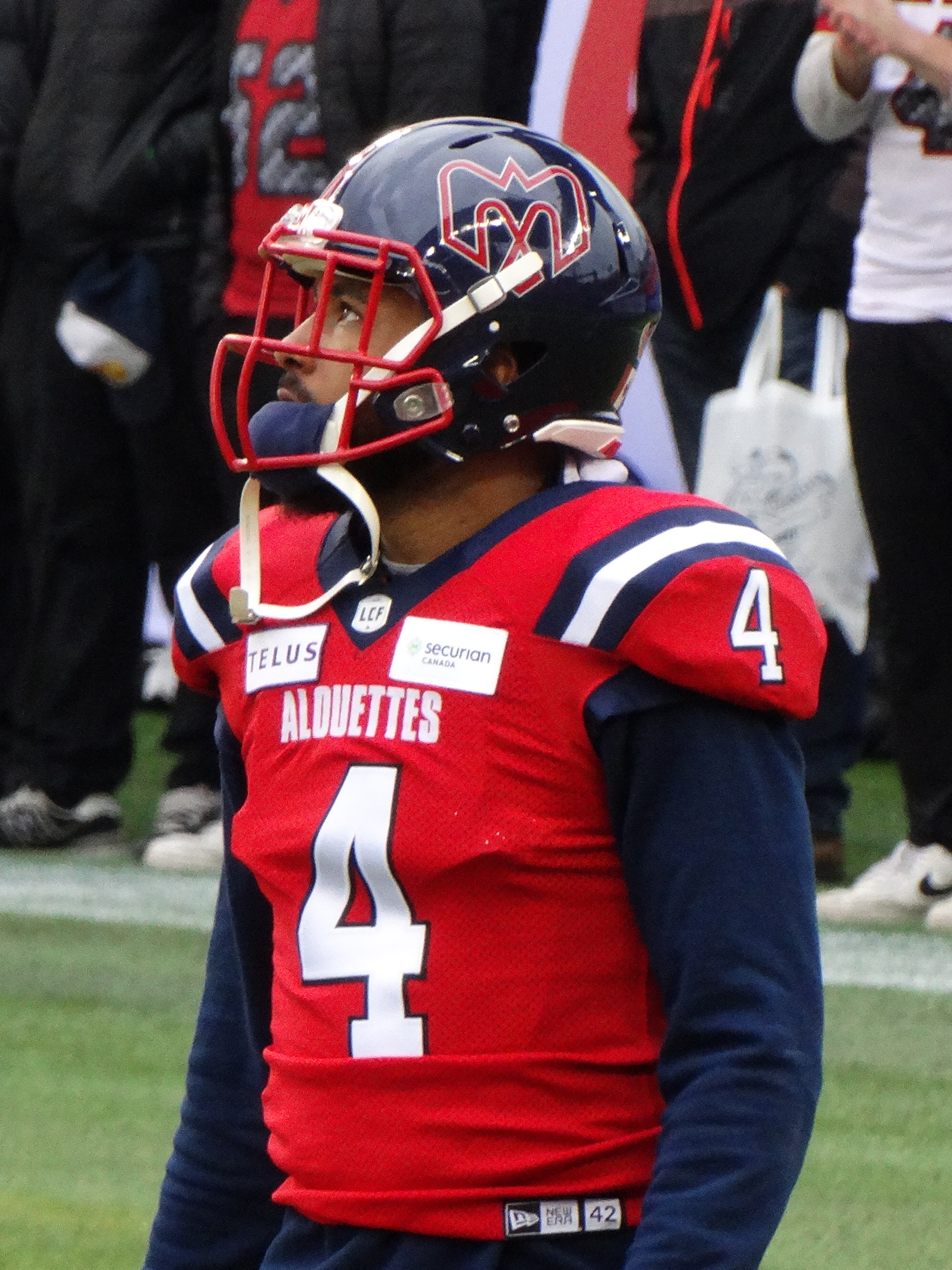
- Evans with the Montreal Alouettes in 2023

Profile
- Position: Defensive back

Personal information
- Born: October 14, 1992 (age 34); Fort Worth, Texas, U.S.
- Listed height: 5 ft 11 in (1.80 m)
- Listed weight: 195 lb (88 kg)

Career information
- High school: Seguin (Arlington, Texas)
- College: Nebraska (2010–2013)
- NFL draft: 2014: undrafted

Career history
- Calgary Stampeders (2015–2018); Salt Lake Stallions (2019); Montreal Alouettes (2019–2020); Hamilton Tiger-Cats (2021–2022); Montreal Alouettes (2023); BC Lions (2024); Toronto Argonauts (2025)*; Montreal Alouettes (2025)
- * Offseason or practice squad member only

Awards and highlights
- 2× Grey Cup champion (2018, 2023); CFL All-Star (2017); 2× CFL West All-Star (2017–2018)

Career CFL statistics as of 2025
- Games played: 119
- Tackles: 300
- Interceptions: 19
- Sacks: 0
- Forced fumbles: 3
- Stats at CFL.ca

Ciante Evans (born October 14, 1992) is an American professional football defensive back. He most recently played for the Montreal Alouettes of the Canadian Football League (CFL). He previously played for the Calgary Stampeders, Montreal Alouettes, Hamilton Tiger-Cats, and BC Lions.

== College career ==
Evans played college football for the Nebraska Cornhuskers.

== Professional career ==
After going undrafted in the 2014 NFL draft Evans attended the Chicago Bears’ rookie mini-camp in 2014, but wasn't offered a contract.

=== Calgary Stampeders ===
Evans signed with the Calgary Stampeders of the Canadian Football League (CFL) in time for the 2015 season. He only appeared in three games during his rookie season. Evans established himself as a starter in 2016 and continued to start for the Stampeders through to the 2018 season which culminated in his first Grey Cup championship. In the 106th Grey Cup game, he had one interception in the victory over the Ottawa Redblacks. He became a free agent on February 12, 2019.

=== Salt Lake Stallions ===
Evans declined CFL offers to join the Salt Lake Stallions of the Alliance of American Football. Prior to the league's shutdown in April, Evans played in 4 games, recording 4 tackles.

=== Montreal Alouettes (first stint) ===
On May 22, 2019, Evans signed with the Montreal Alouettes. He played in 13 regular season games where he had 29 defensive tackles and three interceptions. Evans remained under contract with the Alouettes the following year, but did not play in 2020 due to the cancellation of the 2020 CFL season. During the cancelled season Evans took several part time jobs and refereed basketball, before accepting a high school football coaching position in Texas.

=== Hamilton Tiger-Cats ===
Evans signed with the Hamilton Tiger-Cats on February 9, 2021. In his first season in Hamilton, he contributed with 43 defensive tackles in 13 regular season games. On May 10, 2022, Evans and the Tiger-Cats agreed to a new contract for the 2022 season. He played in 13 regular season games where he had 26 defensive tackles and one interception. He became a free agent upon the expiry of his contract on February 14, 2023.

=== Montreal Alouettes (second stint) ===
On February 17, 2023, it was announced that Evans had signed a one-year contract with the Alouettes. In 2023, he played in 11 regular season games, sitting out seven due to injury, and had ten defensive tackles, 11 special teams tackles, one interception, one forced fumble, and one fumble recovery. He won his second Grey Cup championship following the Alouettes' victory over the Winnipeg Blue Bombers in the 110th Grey Cup game.

Evans became a free agent upon the expiry of his contract on February 13, 2024.

=== BC Lions ===
On February 14, 2024, it was announced that Evans had signed with the BC Lions. On February 11, 2025, Evans left the Lions as a free agent at the expiry of his contract.

=== Toronto Argonauts ===
On February 12, 2025, it was announced that Evans had signed with the Toronto Argonauts. However, he was part of the final cuts on June 1, 2025.

=== Montreal Alouettes (third stint) ===
On August 5, 2025, it was announced that Evans had signed again with the Montreal Alouettes. He became a free agent upon the expiry of his contract on February 10, 2026.
