= Nick Truesdell =

American football player (born 1990)

No. 85
- Position: Tight end

Personal information
- Born: March 14, 1990 (age 36); Cincinnati, Ohio, U.S.
- Listed height: 6 ft 5 in (1.96 m)
- Listed weight: 246 lb (112 kg)

Career information
- High school: Anderson (Cincinnati)
- College: Cincinnati (2008); Grand Rapids CC (2011)
- NFL draft: 2013: undrafted

Career history
- Colorado Ice (2014); Bemidji Axemen (2014); Spokane Shock (2014–2015); Portland Steel (2016); Indianapolis Colts (2016)*; Arizona Rattlers (2017)*; Cleveland Gladiators (2017)*; Minnesota Vikings (2017)*; Salt Lake Stallions (2019); New York Jets (2019)*; Tampa Bay Vipers (2020); New Jersey Generals (2022)
- * Offseason or practice squad member only

Career AFL statistics
- Receptions: 127
- Receiving yards: 1,527
- Receiving touchdowns: 38
- Stats at ArenaFan.com
- Stats at Pro Football Reference

Nicholas Truesdell (born March 14, 1990) is an American former professional football tight end. He was signed by the Colorado Ice as an undrafted free agent in 2014. He played college football at the University of Cincinnati before transferring to Grand Rapids Community College.

== Early life ==
Born to Richard Scantlebury and Teresa Truesdell, Truesdell attended Anderson High School in his native Cincinnati, Ohio. Standing at 6'7", 215 lb, Truesdell lettered all four years playing as a wide receiver and punter under coach Jeff Gesting. In 2007, he was named All-City Honorable Mention by The Cincinnati Enquirer after helping his high school football team go 13–2 and win the Ohio Division II crown. For his senior season efforts, he was named the Redskins' Offensive MVP as he registered 17 catches for 264 yards (including a season-long 55-yard catch and run) and six touchdowns. Truesdell also played basketball in high school.

College recruiting
Name	Hometown	School	Height	Weight	Commit date
Nick Truesdell; WR	Cincinnati, Ohio	Anderson H.S.	6 ft 7 in (2.01 m)	215 lb (98 kg)	Dec 10, 2007
Nick Truesdell; WR	Recruit ratings: Scout: Rivals: 247Sports: ESPN: (NR)				
Overall recruit ranking: Scout: 79 (TE) Rivals: – (WR), 45 (OH)
‡ Refers to 40-yard dash; Note: In many cases, Scout, Rivals, 247Sports, On3, and ESPN may conflict in their listings of height, weight and 40 time.; In these cases, the average was taken. ESPN grades are on a 100-point scale.; Sources: "Cincinnati Football Commitment List". Rivals.; "Cincinnati College Football Recruiting Commits". Scout.; "Scout.com Team Recruiting Rankings". Scout.; "2008 Team Ranking". Rivals.com.

== College career ==
Truesdell decided to stay close to home and enrolled at the University of Cincinnati in 2008. He appeared in six games for the Bearcats' special teams that year but did not yield any statistics before he was dismissed from the team for stealing from the campus bookstore. In June 2009, Truesdell broke into a house and lived there for a week while the owners were on vacation. He also drove their car while living there. Truesdell was charged with second-degree burglary and misuse of a motor vehicle. In June 2010, he was arrested for selling marijuana. In 2011, Truesdell enrolled at Grand Rapids Community College to play football, where he tore his ACL in his first game with the team.

== Professional career ==
=== Indoor Football League ===
After not returning to action in college, Truesdell hired an agent tried to land with a pro team. He was invited to the Cincinnati Bengals rookie minicamp in 2013 and also tried out for the Tennessee Titans that year. In 2014, he played for the Colorado Ice and Bemidji Axemen of the Indoor Football League (IFL). He played in one game for the Ice and caught one pass for four yards. He played in 7 games for the Axemen, catching 28 passes for 402 yards and 9 touchdowns. He also recorded 11 solo tackles and 1 tackle assist with the Axemen. He was invited to rookie minicamp with the Green Bay Packers in 2014 but was not signed.

=== Spokane Shock ===
Later in 2014, Truesdell signed with the Spokane Shock of the Arena Football League (AFL). In his first season, he caught 33 passes for 355 yards and seven touchdowns in nine games. In 2015, he played in all 16 games and delivered his best season to date with 80 receptions, 977 yards and 23 touchdowns for the Shock. In a game against Portland, Truesdell had five touchdown catches in the first half. Truesdell, however, did not get a shot at the league record of nine scores in one game because he strained his hamstring.

=== Portland Steel ===
On November 5, 2015, he was assigned to the AFL's Portland Thunder (which soon changed its nickname to Steel). In his lone season with the team, he recorded 15 receptions for 200 yards and 8 touchdowns.

=== Indianapolis Colts ===
On July 28, 2016, the Indianapolis Colts signed Truesdell to their training camp roster. On July 31, 2016, Truesdell was waived by the team.

=== Arizona Rattlers ===
On October 14, 2016, he was selected by the Arizona Rattlers in the fifth round of the AFL dispersal draft.

=== Cleveland Gladiators ===
He was then assigned to the Cleveland Gladiators of the AFL on January 10, 2017. He was placed on reassignment by the Gladiators on March 17, 2017.

=== Minnesota Vikings ===
On March 25, 2017, Truesdell performed at the NFL Pro Player Combine (also known as veteran combine), where he impressed some NFL scouts after running the 40-yard dash in 4.47–4.60 seconds while measuring in at 6'6" and 252 lb. He received contract offers from the Oakland Raiders, New York Jets, Cincinnati Bengals, Minnesota Vikings, Los Angeles Rams, Atlanta Falcons, Indianapolis Colts, New York Giants, and the Tennessee Titans. On March 30, 2017, Truesdell signed with the Minnesota Vikings. He was waived on September 2, 2017. He was signed to the Vikings' practice squad on January 16, 2018.

=== Salt Lake Stallions ===
In late 2018, Truesdell joined the Salt Lake Stallions of the Alliance of American Football. In 8 games, Truesdell caught 24 passes for 269 yards and 3 touchdowns; only 3 out of 27 passing attempts thrown his way resulted in incompletions, for a catch rate of 89%.

=== New York Jets ===
On August 4, 2019, Truesdell was signed by the New York Jets of the NFL. He was waived on August 13, 2019.

=== Tampa Bay Vipers ===
In October 2019, he was selected in the first round of the 2020 XFL draft by the Tampa Bay Vipers. He played in three games, all starts, for the Vipers during the 2020 XFL season, catching nine passes for 91 yards. He had his contract terminated when the league suspended operations on April 10, 2020.

Truesdell was selected by the Aviators of The Spring League during their player selection draft on October 10, 2020.

=== New Jersey Generals ===
Truesdell was selected by the New Jersey Generals in the 34th round of the 2022 USFL draft. He was transferred to the team's inactive roster before the start of the regular season on April 16, 2022, due to a groin injury. He was released on April 28.

== Career statistics ==
=== AFL ===
Year	Team			
Year	Team	Rec	Yds	TD
2014	Spokane	32	350	7
2015	Spokane	80	977	23
2016	Portland	15	200	8
Career		127	1,527	38

=== AAF ===
Year	Team			
Year	Team	Rec	Yds	TD
2019	Salt Lake	24	269	3
Career		24	269	3

=== XFL ===
Year	Team			
Year	Team	Rec	Yds	TD
2020	Tampa Bay	9	91	0
Career		9	91	0

== Personal life ==
Nick's father, Richard Scantlebury, played professional basketball in England after playing at Coastal Carolina, and Nick's uncle, Peter Scantlebury, received the Most Excellent Order of the British Empire for his contributions to basketball as a player and coach. Peter Scantlebury dunked in a charity game at age 49 in 2013.
