= Jimmy DeBell =

American football official

- Born: 1962 (age 62–63); Rochester, New York, U.S.
- Occupations: NFL official (2009–2014); AAF official (2019)

James DeBell is a former American football official who was in the National Football League (NFL) and the Alliance of American Football (AAF).

== Career ==
DeBell started his career officiating high school football in upstate New York and then eventually moved on to college football. He officiated in the Conference USA and the Big East before joining the NFL. He also refereed in Ivy League and Atlantic 10 as well as the Arena Football League and NFL Europe. He officiated the Emerald Bowl in December 2004.

DeBell made his debut in the NFL as a side judge on the crew of Alberto Riveron in 2009. His first NFL game that he officiated was in Tampa Bay, Florida, where the Dallas Cowboys played against the Tampa Bay Buccaneers. He officiated 17 games his first NFL football season.

His first NFL playoff appearance was in the 2010–11 NFC Divisional round between the Chicago Bears and the Seattle Seahawks. In 2011, he was awarded the Outstanding Football Official Award (Rochester) by the National Football Foundation and College Football Hall of Fame (NFF).

For 2014, DeBell was on the officiating crew headed by referee Bill Vinovich.

On May 29, 2015, it was announced that DeBell would not return to the field for the 2015 NFL season.

During the 2019 AAF season, DeBell is a back judge on the officiating crew led by referee Reggie Smith.

== Personal life ==
Outside of the football, DeBell is retired. He graduated from Arcadia High School in Greece, New York, in 1980 and was involved in all sports including football, baseball, and basketball. At approximately 6 feet 1 inch (1.85 m) and 200 pounds (91 kg), he has the physique of an athlete.

DeBell currently resides in Conesus, New York, with his wife, Luane, and their children, Nikole and Tyger. He is the son of James DeBell, who was well known throughout NYS athletics, and Joyce Debell. He has two sisters, Debbie and Sandy, and a brother, Joe.
