= De'Mornay Pierson-El =

American gridiron football player (born 1995)

No. 15
- Position: Wide receiver

Personal information
- Born: December 26, 1995 (age 30); Alexandria, Virginia, U.S.
- Listed height: 5 ft 9 in (1.75 m)
- Listed weight: 195 lb (88 kg)

Career information
- High school: West Potomac
- College: Nebraska
- NFL draft: 2018: undrafted

Career history
- Washington Redskins (2018)*; Montreal Alouettes (2018); Salt Lake Stallions (2019); Oakland Raiders (2019)*; St. Louis BattleHawks (2020); Las Vegas Raiders (2020)*; Denver Broncos (2021)*; New Jersey Generals (2023)
- * Offseason or practice squad member only
- Stats at Pro Football Reference
- Stats at CFL.ca

De'Mornay Pierson-El (born December 26, 1995) is an American former football wide receiver. He played college football at Nebraska.

== Early life ==
During his four years as an athlete for the West Potomac varsity football team, Pierson-El helped the Wolverines capture a share of the 2011 Patriot District championship as a sophomore receiver, led the team to a playoff berth as a junior running back in 2012, and kept West Potomac competitive as a senior quarterback in 2013. He also played defensive back and returned kicks along the way. As a senior, he earned first-team VHSL all-state honors as an all-purpose defensive player.

== College career ==
Pierson-El played for Nebraska throughout his college career. A Virginia native, he earned All-America honors as a punt returner in 2014 as a true freshman. He contributed on special teams throughout his career and also recorded significant statistics as a receiver.

=== Statistics ===
Season	Receiving					Rushing					Special Teams		
Season	Rec	Yds	Avg	Lng	TD	Att	Yds	Avg	Lng	TD	PR	KR	TD
2014	23	321	14.0	46	4	5	10	2.0	6	0	34–596	10–147	3
2015	12	111	9.3	19	1	3	-9	-3.0	0	0	4–48	0–0	0
2016	20	254	12.7	40	1	14	34	2.4	9	0	24–168	0–0	0
2017	45	623	12.4	36	5	3	23	11.5	12	0	13–92	0–0	0
Total	100	1,309	12.1	46	11	25	58	2.4	12	0	74–904	10–147	3

== Professional career ==
Pre-draft measurables
Height	Weight	Arm length	Hand span	40-yard dash	10-yard split	20-yard split	20-yard shuttle	Three-cone drill	Vertical jump	Broad jump	Bench press
5 ft 8 5/8 in (1.74 m)	194 lb (88 kg)	30 7/8 in (0.78 m)	9 5/8 in (0.24 m)	4.57 s	1.59 s	2.65 s	4.28 s	6.98 s	37.5 in (0.95 m)	10 ft 0 in (3.05 m)	14 reps
All values from Pro Day

=== Washington Redskins ===
Pierson-El was signed by the Washington Redskins as an undrafted free agent on May 2, 2018, but was waived later that month.

=== Montreal Alouettes ===
He signed with the Montreal Alouettes but was cut in August after only dressing for one game.

=== Salt Lake Stallions ===
Pierson-El later joined the Salt Lake Stallions of the Alliance of American Football for the 2019 season.

=== Oakland Raiders ===
After the AAF suspended football operations, Pierson-El signed with the Oakland Raiders on April 8, 2019. He was waived on August 31, 2019. He was re-signed to the practice squad on December 4, 2019. His practice squad contract with the team expired on January 6, 2020.

=== St. Louis BattleHawks ===
Pierson-El was drafted by the St. Louis BattleHawks in the 2020 XFL draft on October 16, 2019. He signed a contract with the team on January 7, 2020. He had his contract terminated when the league suspended operations on April 10, 2020.

=== Las Vegas Raiders (second stint) ===
Pierson-El re-signed with the Las Vegas Raiders on April 30, 2020. He was waived on September 5, 2020. He was re-signed to the practice squad on September 30, 2020. He was released on October 21.

=== Denver Broncos ===
On June 17, 2021, Pierson-El signed with the Denver Broncos. He was waived on August 31, 2021. On September 6, 2021, Pierson-El was re-signed to the practice squad. He was released on December 21.

=== New Jersey Generals ===
Pierson-El signed with the New Jersey Generals of the USFL on December 16, 2022. The Generals folded when the XFL and USFL merged to create the United Football League (UFL).
