= Salt Lake Stallions =

Professional American football team based in Salt Lake City

Logo

General information
- Founded: 2018
- Folded: 2019
- Colors: Blue, Deep Sky Blue and Silver

Personnel
- Head coach: Dennis Erickson
- President: Tyler Howell

Team history
- Salt Lake Stallions (2019)

Home fields
- Rice–Eccles Stadium (2019)

League / conference affiliations
- Alliance of American Football: Western Conference (2019)

The Salt Lake Stallions were a professional American football franchise based in Salt Lake City, and one of the eight members of the Alliance of American Football (AAF), which began play in February 2019. The Stallions were the northernmost team in the AAF, as the league's only franchise north of the 35th parallel. They played their home games at Rice–Eccles Stadium. The team's head coach was Dennis Erickson, owner of a 179–96–1 record coaching college football and a 40–56 record coaching in the NFL.

On April 2, 2019, the league's football operations were reportedly suspended, and on April 4 the league allowed players to leave their contracts to sign with NFL teams. The league filed for Chapter 7 bankruptcy on April 17, 2019.

== History ==
The Alliance Salt Lake City charter franchise was announced to play at Rice–Eccles Stadium by the Alliance of American Football on May 14, 2018. Dennis Erickson was named by the league as head coach on May 16, 2018. Randy Mueller was named general manager by September 25, 2018.

The western four teams' names and logos were revealed on September 25, 2018, with Salt Lake as the Stallions with the colors of blue, deep sky blue, and silver. The name is inspired by the land speed records set at the Bonneville Salt Flats, while the colors represent aspects of Utah's geography like Great Salt Lake and the Wasatch Range.

The final 52-man roster was set on January 30, 2019. The team's first game was a 38–22 defeat to the Arizona Hotshots at Sun Devil Stadium on February 10, 2019. Their first home game was on February 23, also against the Hotshots and ended in a 23–15 victory.

== Final roster ==
2019 Salt Lake Stallions final roster
| Quarterbacks: 8 Austin Allen; 10 Matt Linehan; 6 Josh Woodrum; Running backs: 36 Joel Bouagnon; 34 Terrell Newby; 20 Terry Swanson; 25 Terron Ward; Wide receivers: 80 Kenny Bell; 17 Adonis Jennings; 19 Jordan Leslie; 81 Sam Mobley; 15 De'Mornay Pierson-El; 18 Brian Tyms; Tight ends: 89 Tanner Balderree; 88 Anthony Denham; 83 Austin Traylor; 85 Nick Truesdell | Offensive linemen: 67 Jake Bennett C; 76 Nick Callender T; 79 Ryan Cummings G; 78 Austin Davis C; 75 Tim Gardner T; 63 Leon Johnson T; 66 Tuni Kanuch G; 73 Jeremiah Poutasi T; 64 Salesi Uhatafe G; Defensive linemen: 91 Darius Hamilton DE; 93 Chris Odom DE; 95 Tenny Palepoi DE; 98 Mike Purcell DT; 94 Karter Schult DE; 96 Sealver Siliga DT; 92 Handsome Tanielu DT | Linebackers: 52 Josh Banderas MLB; 55 Luke Carrezola OLB; 51 Greer Martini MLB; 57 Gionni Paul OLB; 59 Trevor Reilly OLB; 50 Ty Schwab MLB; 53 John Timu OLB; Defensive backs: 21 Cody Brown SS; 26 Will Davis CB; 27 Micah Hannemann FS; 24 Jeremiah Johnson CB; 35 C. J. Smith CB; 31 Jordan Sterns FS/SS; 38 Henri' Toliver FS/CB; 23 Steve Williams CB; Special teams: 1 Taylor Bertolet K; 5 Austin Rehkow P; 56 Colton Taylor LS | Reserve lists: 16 Dres Anderson WR (IR); 44 Matt Asiata RB (IR); 11 Kaelin Clay WR (IR); 2 B. J. Daniels QB (IR); 20 Aaron Duckworth RB (IR); 22 Ciante Evans CB (IR); 28 Andre Martin Jr. CB (IR); 29 D. J. May RB (IR); 33 Branden Oliver RB (IR); 37 Darius Price S (IR); 58 Johnny Ragin III LB (IR); 42 Keith Rucker Jr. RB (IR); Rights list: Kennan Gilchrist LB; 51 Active, 13 Inactive |

=== Allocation pool ===
The Stallions had designated rights to players from:

Colleges

- Air Force
- Arkansas
- Boise State
- BYU
- California
- Colorado State
- Dixie State
- Idaho
- Idaho State
- Nebraska
- Northern Colorado
- Northern Illinois
- Oklahoma State
- Oregon
- Southern Utah
- Utah
- Utah State
- Weber State
- Wyoming

National Football League (NFL)

- Denver Broncos
- Green Bay Packers
- Minnesota Vikings
- Seattle Seahawks

Canadian Football League (CFL)

- Calgary Stampeders

== Staff ==
Salt Lake Stallions staff
| Front office: General manager – Randy Mueller; Head coaches: Head coach – Dennis Erickson; Offensive coaches: Offensive coordinator – Tim Lappano; Quarterbacks – Ronald Fouch; Offensive line – Dan Cozzetto; Running backs/Offensive quality control – Nick Alaimalo | Defensive coaches: Defensive coordinator – Donnie Henderson; Linebackers – Denny Creehan; Defensive backs – Ronnie Lee; Defensive quality control – Nick James; Defensive line – Michael Gray; Special teams coaches: Special teams coordinator/Secondary – Ron Zook |

== 2019 season ==
2019 Salt Lake Stallions season
- General manager: Randy Mueller
- Head coach: Dennis Erickson
- Home stadium: Rice–Eccles Stadium

Results
- Record: 3–5
- League place: 3rd (tie), Western Conference

=== Final standings ===
2019 Alliance of American Football standings
Eastern Conference
| Club | W–L | PCT | CONF | PF | PA | DIFF | SOS | SOV | STK |
|---|---|---|---|---|---|---|---|---|---|
| Orlando Apollos | 7–1 | .875 | 5–0 | 236 | 136 | 100 | .406 | .375 | W2 |
| Birmingham Iron | 5–3 | .625 | 3–2 | 165 | 133 | 32 | .406 | .300 | W1 |
| Memphis Express | 2–6 | .250 | 1–4 | 152 | 194 | -42 | .578 | .500 | L1 |
| Atlanta Legends | 2–6 | .250 | 1–4 | 88 | 213 | -125 | .609 | .438 | L3 |
Western Conference
| Club | W–L | PCT | CONF | PF | PA | DIFF | SOS | SOV | STK |
| San Antonio Commanders | 5–3 | .625 | 3–2 | 158 | 154 | 4 | .516 | .450 | L1 |
| Arizona Hotshots | 5–3 | .625 | 3–2 | 186 | 144 | 42 | .469 | .500 | W3 |
| San Diego Fleet | 3–5 | .375 | 2–3 | 158 | 161 | -3 | .469 | .417 | L3 |
| Salt Lake Stallions | 3–5 | .375 | 2–3 | 135 | 143 | -8 | .547 | .417 | W1 |

=== Schedule ===
==== Preseason ====
| Week | Date | Opponent | Result | Record | Venue |
|---|---|---|---|---|---|
| – | January 28 | Memphis Express | W 29–22 | 1–0 | Alamodome |

==== Regular season ====
| Week | Date | Opponent | Result | Record | Venue |
|---|---|---|---|---|---|
| 1 | February 10 | at Arizona Hotshots | L 22–38 | 0–1 | Sun Devil Stadium |
| 2 | February 16 | at Birmingham Iron | L 9–12 | 0–2 | Legion Field |
| 3 | February 23 | Arizona Hotshots | W 23–15 | 1–2 | Rice–Eccles Stadium |
| 4 | March 2 | Orlando Apollos | L 11–20 | 1–3 | Rice–Eccles Stadium |
| 5 | March 9 | at San Diego Fleet | L 25–27 | 1–4 | SDCCU Stadium |
| 6 | March 16 | Memphis Express | W 22–9 | 2–4 | Rice–Eccles Stadium |
| 7 | March 23 | at San Antonio Commanders | L 15–19 | 2–5 | Alamodome |
| 8 | March 30 | San Diego Fleet | W 8–3 | 3–5 | Rice–Eccles Stadium |
| 9 | April 7 | Atlanta Legends | Not played | | Georgia State Stadium |
| 10 | April 12 | San Antonio Commanders | Not played | | Rice–Eccles Stadium |

=== Game summaries ===
==== Week 1: at Arizona ====
Week One: Salt Lake Stallions at Arizona Hotshots – Game summary

| Quarter | 1 | 2 | 3 | 4 | Total |
|---|---|---|---|---|---|
| Stallions | 0 | 16 | 0 | 6 | 22 |
| Hotshots | 8 | 11 | 16 | 3 | 38 |

at Sun Devil Stadium, Tempe, Arizona

- Date: February 10
- Game time: 6:00 p.m. MT
- Game attendance: 11,751
- Referee: James Carter
- TV announcers (NFL Network): Dan Hellie, Marvin Lewis, Maurice Jones-Drew
- NoExtraPoints AAF

Game information

First Quarter

- (1:03) ARIZ – John Wolford 5-yard pass to Gerald Christian (Larry Rose III rush), Hotshots 8–0

Second Quarter

- (10:28) SL – Matt Asiata 1-yard rush (Josh Woodrum rush), Tied 8–8
- (9:30) ARIZ – John Wolford 36-yard pass to Rashad Ross (Jhurell Pressley rush), Hotshots 16–8
- (3:20) ARIZ – Nick Folk 53-yard field goal, Hotshots 19–8
- (0:13) SL – Josh Woodrum 2-yard pass to Jordan Leslie (Branden Oliver rush), Hotshots 19–16

Third Quarter

- (2:52) ARIZ – John Wolford 4-yard pass to Rashad Ross (John Wolford pass to Thomas Duarte), Hotshots 27–16
- (2:36) ARIZ – John Wolford 30-yard pass to Jhurell Pressley (John Wolford pass to Richard Mullaney), Hotshots 35–16

Fourth Quarter

- (11:37) SL – Matt Linehan 7-yard pass to Nick Truesdell (pass failed), Hotshots 35–22
- (6:07) ARIZ – Nick Folk 32-yard field goal, Hotshots 38–22

Top Passers

- SL – Josh Woodrum – 10/22, 103 yards, 1 TD, 1 INT
- ARIZ – John Wolford – 18/29, 275 yards, 4 TD

Top Rushers

- SL – Branden Oliver – 8 carries, 40 yards
- ARIZ – Jhurell Pressley – 18 carries, 64 yards

Top Receivers

- SL – Anthony Denham – 5 receptions, 59 yards
- ARIZ – Rashad Ross – 5 receptions, 103 yards, 2 TD

==== Week 2: at Birmingham ====
Week Two: Salt Lake Stallions at Birmingham Iron – Game summary

| Quarter | 1 | 2 | 3 | 4 | Total |
|---|---|---|---|---|---|
| Stallions | 0 | 9 | 0 | 0 | 9 |
| Iron | 0 | 0 | 6 | 6 | 12 |

at Legion Field, Birmingham, Alabama

- Date: February 16
- Game time: 12:00 p.m. MT
- Game attendance: 17,319
- Referee: Tra Blake
- TV announcers (TNT): Brian Anderson, Marvin Lewis, and Maurice Jones-Drew
- NoExtraPoints AAF

Game information

First Quarter
No scoring plays
Second Quarter

- (1:56) SL – Joel Bouagnon 3-yard rush (rush failed), Stallions 6–0
- (0:32) SL – Taylor Bertolet 53-yard field goal, Stallions 9–0

Third Quarter

- (2:23) BIRM – De'Mornay Pierson-El (SL) fumble recovered by Shaheed Salmon in the end zone for touchdown (rush failed), Stallions 9–6

Fourth Quarter

- (4:40) BIRM – Trent Richardson 3-yard rush (pass failed), Iron 12–9

Top Passers

- SL – Austin Allen – 15/31, 114 yards
- BIRM – Luis Perez – 24/38, 184 yards

Top Rushers

- SL – Joel Bouagnon – 11 carries, 70 yards, 1 TD
- BIRM – Trent Richardson – 19 carries, 41 yards, 1 TD

Top Receivers

- SL – De'Mornay Pierson-El – 4 receptions, 28 yards
- BIRM – Trent Richardson – 6 receptions, 50 yards

==== Week 3: Arizona ====
Week Three: Arizona Hotshots at Salt Lake Stallions – Game summary

| Quarter | 1 | 2 | 3 | 4 | Total |
|---|---|---|---|---|---|
| Hotshots | 0 | 9 | 3 | 3 | 15 |
| Stallions | 3 | 6 | 6 | 8 | 23 |

at Rice–Eccles Stadium, Salt Lake City, Utah

- Date: February 23
- Game time: 1:00 p.m. MT
- Game attendance: 10,412
- Referee: John O'Neill
- TV announcers (B/R Live): Mark Malone, Maurice Jones-Drew, Shaun O'Hara
- NoExtraPoints AAF

Game information

First Quarter

- (9:14) SL – Taylor Bertolet 54-yard field goal, Stallions 3–0

Second Quarter

- (11:32) SL – Josh Woodrum 25-yard pass to De'Mornay Pierson-El (pass failed), Stallions 9–0
- (6:03) ARIZ – Nick Folk 48-yard field goal, Stallions 9–3
- (0:21) ARIZ – John Wolford 1-yard pass to Rashad Ross (rush failed), Tied 9–9

Third Quarter

- (13:51) SL – Branden Oliver 1-yard rush (pass failed), Stallions 15–9
- (0:49) ARIZ – Nick Folk 35-yard field goal, Stallions 15–12

Fourth Quarter

- (7:24) SL – Joel Bouagnon 1-yard rush (Josh Woodrum pass to De'Mornay Pierson-El), Stallions 23–12
- (0:19) ARIZ – Nick Folk 45-yard field goal, Stallions 23–15

Top Passers

- ARIZ – John Wolford – 14/22, 127 yards, 1 TD, 1 INT
- SL – Josh Woodrum – 22/31, 178 yards, 1 TD

Top Rushers

- ARIZ – Jhurell Pressley – 10 carries, 34 yards
- SL – Joel Bouagnon – 12 carries, 45 yards, 1 TD

Top Receivers

- ARIZ – Rashad Ross – 6 receptions, 51 yards, 1 TD
- SL – De'Mornay Pierson-El – 8 receptions, 90 yards, 1 TD

==== Week 4: Orlando ====
Week Four: Orlando Apollos at Salt Lake Stallions – Game summary

| Quarter | 1 | 2 | 3 | 4 | Total |
|---|---|---|---|---|---|
| Apollos | 3 | 3 | 8 | 6 | 20 |
| Stallions | 0 | 3 | 8 | 0 | 11 |

at Rice–Eccles Stadium, Salt Lake City, Utah

- Date: March 2
- Game time: 6:00 p.m. MT
- Game weather: Snow
- Game attendance: 9,302
- Referee: Brandon Cruse
- TV announcers (NFL Network): Dan Hellie, Shaun O'Hara
- NoExtraPoints AAF

Game information

First Quarter

- (1:10) ORL – Elliott Fry 43-yard field goal, Apollos 3–0

Second Quarter

- (11:42) SL – Taylor Bertolet 36-yard field goal, Tied 3–3
- (6:10) ORL – Elliott Fry 42-yard field goal, Apollos 6–3

Third Quarter

- (6:01) ORL – Garrett Gilbert 20-yard pass to Donteea Dye (Garrett Gilbert pass to Sean Price), Apollos 14–3
- (0:27) SL – Joel Bouagnon 14-yard rush (Josh Woodrum pass to Terrell Newby), Apollos 14–11

Fourth Quarter

- (11:17) ORL – Akeem Hunt 2-yard rush (pass failed), Apollos 20–11

Top Passers

- ORL – Garrett Gilbert – 22/32, 244 yards, 1 TD
- SL – Josh Woodrum – 16/22, 161 yards

Top Rushers

- ORL – De'Veon Smith – 12 carries, 51 yards
- SL – Branden Oliver – 17 carries, 71 yards

Top Receivers

- ORL – Charles Johnson – 9 receptions, 105 yards
- SL – Adonis Jennings – 2 receptions, 43 yards

==== Week 5: at San Diego ====
Week Five: Salt Lake Stallions at San Diego Fleet – Game summary

| Quarter | 1 | 2 | 3 | 4 | Total |
|---|---|---|---|---|---|
| Stallions | 8 | 0 | 3 | 14 | 25 |
| Fleet | 3 | 3 | 12 | 9 | 27 |

at SDCCU Stadium, San Diego, California

- Date: March 9
- Game time: 6:00 p.m. MT
- Game attendance: 20,823
- Referee: Jeff Heaser
- TV announcers (NFL Network): Dan Hellie, Steve Mariucci, Marvin Lewis
- NoExtraPoints AAF

Game information

First Quarter

- (4:56) SD – Donny Hageman 39-yard field goal, Fleet 3–0
- (0:27) SL – Joel Bouagnon 3-yard rush (Josh Woodrum rush), Stallions 8–3

Second Quarter

- (13:15) SD – Donny Hageman 34-yard field goal, Stallions 8–6

Third Quarter

- (8:15) SL – Taylor Bertolet 44-yard field goal, Stallions 11–6
- (3:06) SD – Jordan Martin 41-yard fumble return (rush failed), Fleet 12–11
- (2:15) SD – Mike Bercovici 18-yard pass to Ben Johnson (rush failed), Fleet 18–11

Fourth Quarter

- (9:26) SD – Kameron Kelly 23-yard interception return (rush failed), Fleet 24–11
- (4:02) SL – Joel Bouagnon 4-yard rush (rush failed), Fleet 24–17
- (0:51) SL – Josh Woodrum 6-yard pass to Nick Truesdell (Josh Woodrum pass to Kenny Bell), Stallions 25–24
- (0:00) SD – Donny Hageman 44-yard field goal, Fleet 27–25

Top Passers

- SL – Josh Woodrum – 31/48, 380 yards, 1 TD, 3 INT
- SD – Mike Bercovici – 22/43, 304 yards, 1 TD, 1 INT

Top Rushers

- SL – Joel Bouagnon – 11 carries, 36 yards, 2 TD
- SD – Terrell Watson – 5 carries, 14 yards

Top Receivers

- SL – De'Mornay Pierson-El – 8 receptions, 130 yards
- SD – Dontez Ford – 3 receptions, 94 yards

==== Week 6: Memphis ====
Week Six: Memphis Express at Salt Lake Stallions – Game summary

| Quarter | 1 | 2 | 3 | 4 | Total |
|---|---|---|---|---|---|
| Express | 0 | 9 | 0 | 0 | 9 |
| Stallions | 16 | 3 | 0 | 3 | 22 |

at Rice–Eccles Stadium, Salt Lake City, Utah

- Date: March 16
- Game time: 2:00 p.m. MT
- Game weather: Sunny • Temperature: 47 °F (8 °C) • Wind: 5–10 mph
- Game attendance: 8,150
- Referee: Reggie Smith
- TV announcers (B/R Live): Mark Malone, Marvin Lewis, Maurice Jones-Drew
- NoExtraPoints AAF

Game information

First Quarter

- (9:18) SL – Josh Woodrum 11-yard pass to Nick Truesdell (Josh Woodrum pass to Jordan Leslie), Stallions 8–0
- (0:40) SL – Josh Woodrum 14-yard pass to Anthony Denham (Josh Woodrum pass to Terrell Newby), Stallions 16–0

Second Quarter

- (11:07) SL – Taylor Bertolet 26-yard field goal, Stallions 19–0
- (7:15) MEM – Austin MacGinnis 31-yard field goal, Stallions 19–3
- (1:54) MEM – Brandon Silvers 11-yard pass to Zac Stacy (pass failed), Stallions 19–9

Third Quarter
No scoring plays
Fourth Quarter

- (11:57) SL – Taylor Bertolet 22-yard field goal, Stallions 22–9

Top Passers

- MEM – Brandon Silvers – 23/37, 242 yards, 1 TD
- SL – Josh Woodrum – 24/37, 243 yards, 2 TD, 1 INT

Top Rushers

- MEM – Zac Stacy – 11 carries, 31 yards
- SL – Joel Bouagnon – 19 carries, 60 yards

Top Receivers

- MEM – Reece Horn – 8 receptions, 129 yards
- SL – Nick Truesdell – 5 receptions, 67 yards, 1 TD

==== Week 7: at San Antonio ====
Week Seven: Salt Lake Stallions at San Antonio Commanders – Game summary

| Quarter | 1 | 2 | 3 | 4 | Total |
|---|---|---|---|---|---|
| Stallions | 3 | 3 | 3 | 6 | 15 |
| Commanders | 6 | 3 | 0 | 10 | 19 |

at Alamodome, San Antonio, Texas

- Date: March 23
- Game time: 6:00 p.m. MT
- Game weather: Indoors
- Game attendance: 30,345
- Referee: John O'Neill
- TV announcers (NFL Network): Dan Hellie, Steve Mariucci, Jason Fisher
- NoExtraPoints AAF

Game information

First Quarter

- (9:17) SL – Taylor Bertolet 32-yard field goal, Stallions 3–0
- (4:42) SA – Logan Woodside 21-yard pass to Mekale McKay (pass failed), Commanders 6–3

Second Quarter

- (14:10) SL – Taylor Bertolet 53-yard field goal, Tied 6–6
- (0:05) SA – Nick Rose 23-yard field goal, Commanders 9–6

Third Quarter

- (9:20) SL – Taylor Bertolet 52-yard field goal, Tied 9–9

Fourth Quarter

- (5:25) SA – Marquise Williams 36-yard pass to Trey Williams (Marquise Williams pass to Greg Ward Jr.), Commanders 17–9
- (1:54) SL – Josh Woodrum 21-yard pass to Terrell Newby (pass intercepted by De'Vante Bausby and returned for defensive 2-pt), Commanders 19–15

Top Passers

- SL – Josh Woodrum – 22/35, 229 yards, 1 TD, 1 INT
- SA – Logan Woodside – 13/19, 164 yards, 1 TD, 1 INT

Top Rushers

- SL – Joel Bouagnon – 9 carries, 35 yards
- SA – Marquise Williams – 6 carries, 19 yards

Top Receivers

- SL – Nick Truesdell – 4 receptions, 74 yards
- SA – Evan Rodriguez – 3 receptions, 71 yards

==== Week 8: San Diego ====
Week Eight: San Diego Fleet at Salt Lake Stallions – Game summary

| Quarter | 1 | 2 | 3 | 4 | Total |
|---|---|---|---|---|---|
| Fleet | 0 | 0 | 0 | 3 | 3 |
| Stallions | 0 | 8 | 0 | 0 | 8 |

at Rice–Eccles Stadium, Salt Lake City, Utah

- Date: March 30
- Game time: 6:00 p.m. MT
- Game weather: Cloudy • Temperature: 49 °F (9 °C) • Wind: 7 mph
- Game attendance: 8,405
- Referee: Brandon Cruse
- TV announcers (NFL Network): Matt "Money" Smith, Marvin Lewis, Jason Fisher
- NoExtraPoints AAF

Game information

First Quarter
No scoring plays
Second Quarter

- (1:18) SL – Joel Bouagnon 4-yard rush (Josh Woodrum pass to Jordan Leslie), Stallions 8–0

Third Quarter
No scoring plays
Fourth Quarter

- (10:45) SD – Donny Hageman 29-yard field goal, Stallions 8–3

Top Passers

- SD – Mike Bercovici – 22/47, 210 yards, 2 INT
- SL – Josh Woodrum – 21/32, 155 yards, 2 INT

Top Rushers

- SD – Bishop Sankey – 11 carries, 42 yards
- SL – Terron Ward – 18 carries, 47 yards

Top Receivers

- SD – Nelson Spruce – 8 receptions, 79 yards
- SL – Anthony Denham – 4 receptions, 32 yards

== Media ==
In addition to league-wide television coverage through NFL Network, CBS Sports Network, TNT, and B/R Live, Stallions' games were also broadcast on local radio by KALL, an ESPN Radio affiliate.
