= Josh Woodrum =

American football player (born 1992)

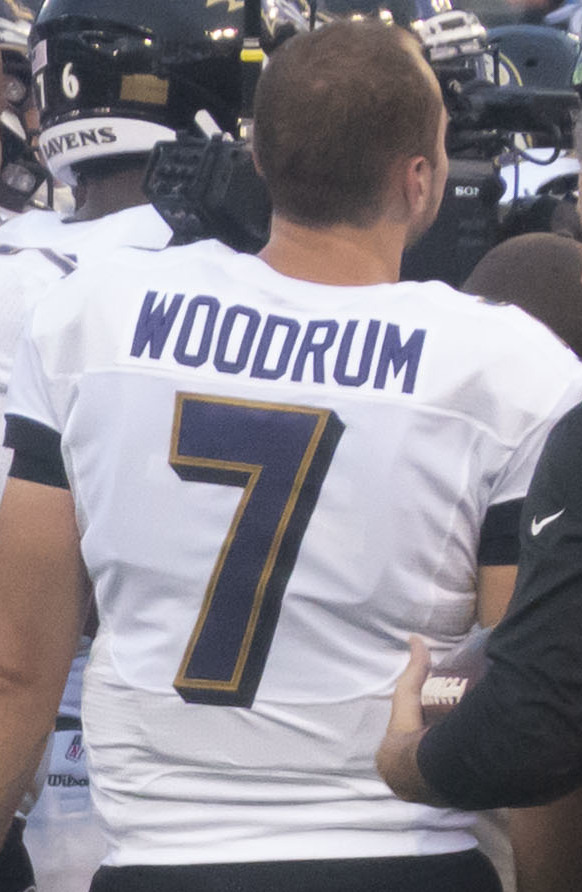
- Woodrum with the Baltimore Ravens in 2018

No. 6, 7
- Position: Quarterback

Personal information
- Born: November 7, 1992 (age 34); Roanoke, Virginia, U.S.
- Listed height: 6 ft 3 in (1.91 m)
- Listed weight: 230 lb (104 kg)

Career information
- High school: Cave Spring (Roanoke)
- College: Liberty
- NFL draft: 2016: undrafted

Career history
- New York Giants (2016)*; Indianapolis Colts (2016)*; Chicago Bears (2016)*; Buffalo Bills (2017)*; Baltimore Ravens (2017)*; Cleveland Browns (2017)*; Baltimore Ravens (2017–2018)*; Salt Lake Stallions (2019); Washington Redskins (2019)
- * Offseason or practice squad member only
- Stats at Pro Football Reference

Josh Woodrum (born November 7, 1992) is an American former professional football quarterback. He played college football at Liberty University and signed with the New York Giants as an undrafted free agent in 2016.

== Early life ==
Woodrum attended Cave Spring High School in Roanoke, Virginia. A 2-star recruit, Woodrum committed to play college football at Liberty over offers from Elon and Wake Forest.

== College career ==
After redshirting as a freshman in 2011, Woodrum became the starting quarterback for the Liberty Flames football team, a position that he would remain in for the next four years. Woodrum led the Flames to three consecutive Big South Conference football championships from 2012 to 2014, including an appearance in the FCS playoffs in 2014. After completing his senior season in 2015, Woodrum began preparing for the National Football League Draft. In preparation for the draft, Woodrum was invited to and played in the 2016 NFLPA Collegiate Bowl. Along with North Dakota State's Carson Wentz, Woodrum was one of only two Football Championship Subdivision quarterbacks to receive an invitation to participate in the 2016 NFL Scouting Combine in Indianapolis.

== Professional career ==
Pre-draft measurables
Height	Weight	Arm length	Hand span	40-yard dash	10-yard split	20-yard split	20-yard shuttle	Three-cone drill	Vertical jump	Broad jump
6 ft 2 7/8 in (1.90 m)	231 lb (105 kg)	31 7/8 in (0.81 m)	9 1/4 in (0.23 m)	4.80 s	1.62 s	2.78 s	4.31 s	6.74 s	31.0 in (0.79 m)	9 ft 9 in (2.97 m)
All values from the NFL Combine

=== New York Giants ===
Following the 2016 NFL draft, Woodrum signed as an undrafted free agent with the New York Giants. Following the Giants' rookie minicamp, the Giants released Woodrum after just three days in New York.

=== Indianapolis Colts ===
After being waived by the Giants, Woodrum was claimed off waivers by the Indianapolis Colts. On July 19, 2016, the Colts waived Woodrum.

=== Chicago Bears ===
On November 15, 2016, Woodrum was signed to the Chicago Bears practice squad. On December 5, 2016, the Bears released Woodrum.

=== Buffalo Bills ===
On January 2, 2017, Woodrum signed a reserve/future contract with the Buffalo Bills. He was waived by the Bills on May 24, 2017.

=== Baltimore Ravens (first stint) ===
On July 31, 2017, Woodrum signed with the Baltimore Ravens. He saw his first preseason action with the Ravens, where he took full advantage of the opportunity. He finished the preseason going 25 of 36 for 321 passing yards and 4 total touchdowns. He was waived on September 2, 2017.

=== Cleveland Browns ===
On September 3, 2017, Woodrum was claimed off waivers by the Cleveland Browns. Woodrum was released by the Browns on September 7, 2017.

=== Baltimore Ravens (second stint) ===
On September 12, 2017, Woodrum was re-signed to the Ravens' practice squad. He signed a reserve/future contract with the Ravens on January 1, 2018.

On September 1, 2018, Woodrum was waived by the Ravens.

=== Salt Lake Stallions ===
On November 27, 2018, Woodrum was selected by the Salt Lake Stallions with the eighth-overall pick in the Alliance of American Football's quarterback draft. He eventually started the Stallions' season opener against the Arizona Hotshots, where he threw for 103 yards, 1 TD, and 1 INT before leaving the game in the second half with a hamstring injury.

=== Washington Redskins ===
After the AAF suspended operations, Woodrum signed with the Washington Redskins on April 18, 2019. He tore his pectoral on August 8 in a preseason game against the Browns and was placed on injured reserve.

Woodrum became a free agent on March 18, 2020, after the Redskins chose not to tender him as an exclusive-rights free agent following the 2019 season.

=== AAF statistics ===
Year	Team	Games		Passing								Rushing				Sacked		Fumbles	
Year	Team	GP	GS	Comp	Att	Pct	Yds	Avg	TD	Int	Rate	Att	Yds	Avg	TD	Sck	SckY	FUM	Lost
2019	SLS	7	7	146	227	64.3	1,449	6.4	6	8	76.4	10	25	2.5	0	10	56	6	2
Career		7	7	146	227	64.3	1,449	6.4	6	8	76.4	10	25	2.5	0	10	56	6	2
