= 2019 AAF season =

2019 season of a professional American football league

2019 Alliance of American Football season
- League: Alliance of American Football
- Sport: American football
- Duration: February 9 – April 14 (planned); February 9 – March 31 (actual)
- Games: 40 scheduled (10 per team); 32 played (8 per team)
- Teams: 8
- TV partner(s): CBS, CBS Sports Network, NFL Network, TNT
- Best regular season record: Orlando Apollos

The 2019 AAF season was the only season in the history of the Alliance of American Football (AAF), which began on February 9, 2019. A ten-week regular season was scheduled for each of the league's eight teams.

On April 2, multiple sources indicated that Thomas Dundon, the controlling owner of the AAF, had followed through on threats made in the previous week and suspended the AAF's operations, against the will of its founders. By the end of the week, the AAF front office had confirmed the suspension of operations and allowed players to opt-out of their contracts to sign with other leagues. The league filed for Chapter 7 bankruptcy on April 17, 2019.

At the time the season ended, eight out of ten scheduled weeks had been played, and the Orlando Apollos, with a league best 7–1 record two games ahead of its nearest competitors, had clinched no less than a share of the regular season's best record, regardless of how the rest of the schedule would have played out. A four-team playoff was scheduled to start on April 21, with a championship game on April 27. Initially scheduled for Sam Boyd Stadium on the outskirts of Las Vegas, Nevada, the title game was moved to the Ford Center at The Star in Frisco, Texas, before the league ceased operations.

== Teams ==
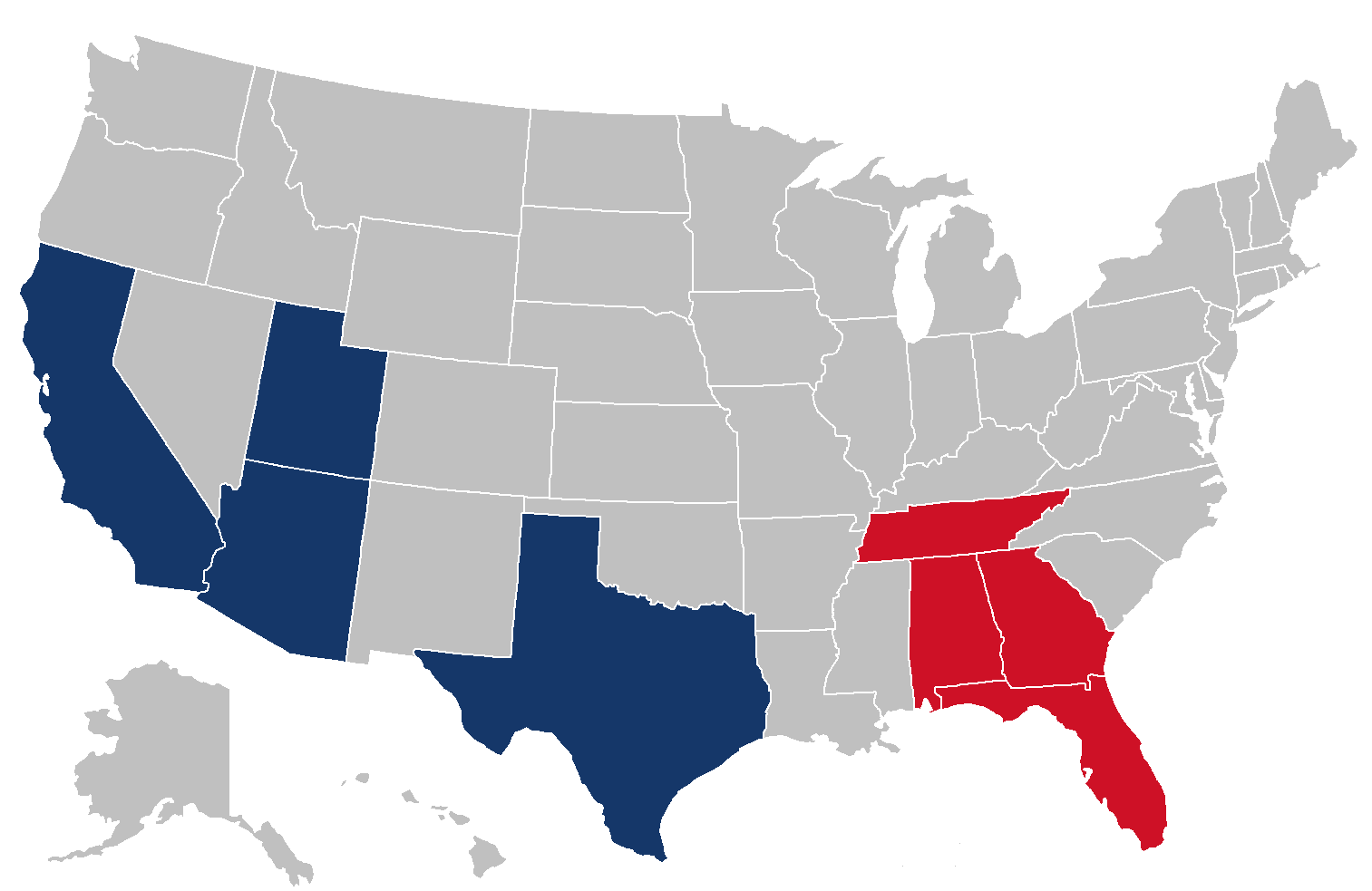
Eastern Conference Western Conference

The Alliance of American Football had eight teams competing during its inaugural season.

Club	City	Stadium	Head coach
Eastern Conference
Atlanta Legends	Atlanta, Georgia	Georgia State Stadium	Kevin Coyle
Birmingham Iron	Birmingham, Alabama	Legion Field	Tim Lewis
Memphis Express	Memphis, Tennessee	Liberty Bowl Memorial Stadium	Mike Singletary
Orlando Apollos	Orlando, Florida	Spectrum Stadium	Steve Spurrier
Western Conference
Arizona Hotshots	Tempe, Arizona	Sun Devil Stadium	Rick Neuheisel
Salt Lake Stallions	Salt Lake City, Utah	Rice–Eccles Stadium	Dennis Erickson
San Antonio Commanders	San Antonio, Texas	Alamodome	Mike Riley
San Diego Fleet	San Diego, California	SDCCU Stadium	Mike Martz

== Final standings ==
The Orlando Apollos clinched a playoff berth on March 24, and top seed in the Eastern Conference on March 30. The Birmingham Iron clinched a playoff berth on March 31.

2019 Alliance of American Football standings
Eastern Conference
Club	W–L	PCT	CONF	PF	PA	DIFF	SOS	SOV	STK
Orlando Apollos	7–1	.875	5–0	236	136	100	.406	.375	W2
Birmingham Iron	5–3	.625	3–2	165	133	32	.406	.300	W1
Memphis Express	2–6	.250	1–4	152	194	-42	.578	.500	L1
Atlanta Legends	2–6	.250	1–4	88	213	-125	.609	.438	L3
Western Conference
Club	W–L	PCT	CONF	PF	PA	DIFF	SOS	SOV	STK
San Antonio Commanders	5–3	.625	3–2	158	154	4	.516	.450	L1
Arizona Hotshots	5–3	.625	3–2	186	144	42	.469	.500	W3
San Diego Fleet	3–5	.375	2–3	158	161	-3	.469	.417	L3
Salt Lake Stallions	3–5	.375	2–3	135	143	-8	.547	.417	W1

== Schedule ==
Each team had a ten-game regular season schedule, consisting of six in-conference games (home-and-away against each of the other three teams) and four out-of-conference games (one game against each of four teams; two home and two away). Weeks 2, 4, 6, and 9 were scheduled with out-of-conference games. Each team played one preseason exhibition game against an out-of-conference opponent. All of the preseason scrimmage games were held January 27–28 at the Alamodome, in conjunction with the league's training camp.

Week 1
Date and time	Away team	Result	Home team	Stadium	Attendance	Broadcast	Viewership (millions)
February 9, 8:00 p.m. ET	Atlanta Legends	6-40	Orlando Apollos	Spectrum Stadium	20,191	CBS	3.30
February 9, 8:00 p.m. ET	San Diego Fleet	6-15	San Antonio Commanders	Alamodome	27,857	CBS	3.30
February 10, 4:00 p.m. ET	Memphis Express	0-26	Birmingham Iron	Legion Field	17,039	CBSSN	N/A
February 10, 8:00 p.m. ET	Salt Lake Stallions	22-38	Arizona Hotshots	Sun Devil Stadium	11,751	NFL Network	0.60

Week 2
Date and time	Away team	Result	Home team	Stadium	Attendance	Broadcast	Viewership (millions)
February 16, 2:00 p.m. ET	Salt Lake Stallions	9-12	Birmingham Iron	Legion Field	17,319	TNT	1.00
February 16, 8:00 p.m. ET	Arizona Hotshots	20-18	Memphis Express	Liberty Bowl Memorial Stadium	11,980	NFL Network	0.40
February 17, 4:00 p.m. ET	Orlando Apollos	37-29	San Antonio Commanders	Alamodome	29,176	CBSSN	N/A
February 17, 8:00 p.m. ET	Atlanta Legends	12-24	San Diego Fleet	SDCCU Stadium	20,019	NFL Network	0.40

Week 3
Date and time	Away team	Result	Home team	Stadium	Attendance	Broadcast	Viewership (millions)
February 23, 3:00 p.m. ET	Arizona Hotshots	15-23	Salt Lake Stallions	Rice-Eccles Stadium	10,412	B/R Live	N/A
February 23, 8:00 p.m. ET	Memphis Express	17-21	Orlando Apollos	Spectrum Stadium	20,394	NFL Network	0.50
February 24, 4:00 p.m. ET	Birmingham Iron	28-12	Atlanta Legends	Georgia State Stadium	10,717	CBSSN	N/A
February 24, 8:00 p.m. ET	San Antonio Commanders	11-31	San Diego Fleet	SDCCU Stadium	14,789	NFL Network	0.50

Week 4
Date and time	Away team	Result	Home team	Stadium	Attendance	Broadcast	Viewership (millions)
March 2, 4:00 p.m. ET	San Diego Fleet	23-26	Memphis Express	Liberty Bowl Memorial Stadium	13,621	B/R Live	N/A
March 2, 8:00 p.m. ET	Orlando Apollos	20-11	Salt Lake Stallions	Rice-Eccles Stadium	9,302	NFL Network	0.50
March 3, 4:00 p.m. ET	San Antonio Commanders	12-11	Birmingham Iron	Legion Field	6,539	CBSSN	N/A
March 3, 8:00 p.m. ET	Atlanta Legends	14-11	Arizona Hotshots	Sun Devil Stadium	8,865	NFL Network	0.40

Week 5
Date and time	Away team	Result	Home team	Stadium	Attendance	Broadcast	Viewership (millions)
March 9, 2:00 p.m. ET	Orlando Apollos	31-14	Birmingham Iron	Legion Field	13,310	TNT	0.50
March 9, 8:00 p.m. ET	Salt Lake Stallions	25-27	San Diego Fleet	SDCCU Stadium	20,823	NFL Network	0.30
March 10, 4:00 p.m. ET	Memphis Express	20-23	Atlanta Legends	Georgia State Stadium	10,829	CBSSN	N/A
March 10, 8:00 p.m. ET	San Antonio Commanders	29-25	Arizona Hotshots	Sun Devil Stadium	9,351	NFL Network	N/A

Week 6
Date and time	Away team	Result	Home team	Stadium	Attendance	Broadcast	Viewership (millions)
March 16, 4:00 p.m. ET	Memphis Express	9-22	Salt Lake Stallions	Rice-Eccles Stadium	8,150	B/R Live	N/A
March 16, 8:00 p.m. ET	Arizona Hotshots	22-17	Orlando Apollos	Spectrum Stadium	18,358	NFL Network	0.40
March 17, 4:00 p.m. ET	San Antonio Commanders	37-6	Atlanta Legends	Georgia State Stadium	10,619	CBSSN	N/A
March 17, 8:00 p.m. ET	Birmingham Iron	32-29	San Diego Fleet	SDCCU Stadium	20,986	NFL Network	N/A

Week 7
Date and time	Away team	Result	Home team	Stadium	Attendance	Broadcast	Viewership (millions)
March 23, 2:00 p.m. ET	Orlando Apollos	36-6	Atlanta Legends	Georgia State Stadium	11,416	TNT	0.30
March 23, 8:00 p.m. ET	Salt Lake Stallions	15-19	San Antonio Commanders	Alamodome	30,345	NFL Network	N/A
March 24, 4:00 p.m. ET	San Diego Fleet	15-32	Arizona Hotshots	Sun Devil Stadium	9,760	CBSSN	N/A
March 24, 8:00 p.m. ET	Birmingham Iron	25-31 (OT)	Memphis Express	Liberty Bowl Memorial Stadium	13,758	NFL Network	N/A

Week 8
Date and time	Away team	Result	Home team	Stadium	Attendance	Broadcast	Viewership (millions)
March 30, 2:00 p.m. ET	Orlando Apollos	34-31	Memphis Express	Liberty Bowl Memorial Stadium	12,417	TNT	0.50
March 30, 8:00 p.m. ET	San Diego Fleet	3-8	Salt Lake Stallions	Rice-Eccles Stadium	8,405	NFL Network	N/A
March 31, 4:00 p.m. ET	Atlanta Legends	9-17	Birmingham Iron	Legion Field	17,328	CBSSN	N/A
March 31, 8:00 p.m. ET	Arizona Hotshots	23-6	San Antonio Commanders	Alamodome	23,504	NFL Network	N/A

Week 9
Date and time	Away team	Result	Home team	Stadium	Attendance	Broadcast	Viewership (millions)
April 6, 12:00 p.m. ET	Memphis Express	----	San Antonio Commanders	Alamodome	-----	CBS	----
April 6, 8:00 p.m. ET	San Diego Fleet	----	Orlando Apollos	Spectrum Stadium	-----	NFL Network	----
April 7, 4:00 p.m. ET	Salt Lake Stallions	----	Atlanta Legends	Georgia State Stadium	-----	B/R Live	----
April 7, 8:00 p.m. ET	Birmingham Iron	----	Arizona Hotshots	Sun Devil Stadium	-----	NFL Network	----

Week 10
Date and time	Away team	Result	Home team	Stadium	Attendance	Broadcast	Viewership (millions)
April 12, 8:00 p.m. ET	San Antonio Commanders	----	Salt Lake Stallions	Rice-Eccles Stadium	-----	B/R Live	----
April 13, 8:00 p.m. ET	Atlanta Legends	----	Memphis Express	Liberty Bowl Memorial Stadium	-----	NFL Network	----
April 14, 3:30 p.m. ET	Birmingham Iron	----	Orlando Apollos	Spectrum Stadium	-----	CBSSN	----
April 14, 8:00 p.m. ET	Arizona Hotshots	----	San Diego Fleet	SDCCU Stadium	-----	NFL Network	----

== Playoffs ==
Following the 10-week regular season, the top two teams in each conference were due to face each other in conference championship games, hosted by the higher seeded team. These semifinals were scheduled for April 21. The winners would then meet in the league championship game on April 27 at a neutral site. Originally, the title game had been set for Sam Boyd Stadium near Las Vegas, Nevada announced October 23, 2018, but was changed to Ford Center at The Star in Frisco, Texas on March 20, 2019, before the season was ended.

Division Finals
Sunday, April 21; Spectrum Stadium – Orlando, Florida
E1	Orlando Apollos
E2	Birmingham Iron
Sunday, April 21; Would have been hosted by W1
W1
W2

2019 AAF Championship Game
Saturday, April 27; Ford Center at The Star – Frisco, Texas

== Attendance ==
Announced attendance figures for each home game. In the weekly columns, dashes (—) indicate away games, while bold font indicates the highest attendance of each team. Games marked "N/A" were not played.

Team / Week	1	2	3	4	5	6	7	8	9	10	Total	Average
San Antonio Commanders	27,857	29,176	—	—	—	—	**30,345**	23,504	—N/a	—	110,882	**27,721**
Orlando Apollos	20,191	—	**20,394**	—	—	18,358	—	—	—N/a	—N/a	58,943	**19,648**
San Diego Fleet	—	20,019	14,789	—	20,823	**20,986**	—	—	—	—N/a	76,617	**19,154**
Birmingham Iron	17,039	17,319	—	6,539	13,310	—	—	**17,328**	—	—	71,535	**14,307**
Memphis Express	—	11,980	—	13,621	—	—	**13,758**	12,417	—	—N/a	51,776	**12,944**
Atlanta Legends	—	—	10,717	—	10,829	10,619	**11,416**	—	—N/a	—	43,581	**10,895**
Arizona Hotshots	**11,751**	—	—	8,865	9,351	—	9,760	—	—N/a	—	39,727	**9,932**
Salt Lake Stallions	—	—	**10,412**	9,302	—	8,150	—	8,405	—	—N/a	36,269	**9,067**
Total	76,838	78,494	56,312	38,327	54,313	58,113	65,279	61,654			489,330	
Average	19,210	19,624	14,078	9,582	13,578	14,528	16,320	15,414				15,292

Updated through games of March 31, 2019.

== Awards ==
=== Players of the week ===
Week	Offensive			Defensive			Special teams			Ref.
Week	Player	Pos.	Team	Player	Pos.	Team	Player	Pos.	Team	Ref.
1	John Wolford	QB	Arizona Hotshots	Terence Garvin	LB	Orlando Apollos	Nick Novak	K	Birmingham Iron	
2	Garrett Gilbert	QB	Orlando Apollos	Keith Reaser	CB	Orlando Apollos	Jamar Summers	CB	Birmingham Iron	
3	Ja'Quan Gardner	RB	San Diego Fleet	A. J. Tarpley	LB	San Diego Fleet	Colton Schmidt	P	Birmingham Iron	
4	Kenneth Farrow	RB	San Antonio Commanders	Drew Jackson	LB	Memphis Express	Austin MacGinnis	K	Memphis Express	
5	Logan Woodside	QB	San Antonio Commanders	Kameron Kelly	CB	San Diego Fleet	Younghoe Koo	K	Atlanta Legends	
6	L'Damian Washington	WR	Birmingham Iron	Karter Schult	DE	Salt Lake Stallions	Greg Ward Jr.	PR	San Antonio Commanders	
7	John Wolford	QB	Arizona Hotshots	DeMarquis Gates	OLB	Memphis Express	Joseph Zema	P	San Antonio Commanders	

== Statistical leaders ==
Records reflect statistics through the eight regular season games played by all teams.

Type	Statistic	Qty	Player	Team
Passing	Yards	2,152	Garrett Gilbert	Orlando Apollos
Passing	Touchdowns	14	John Wolford	Arizona Hotshots
Passing	Interceptions	9	Mike Bercovici	San Diego Fleet
Rushing	Yards	431	Jhurell Pressley	Arizona Hotshots
Rushing	Touchdowns	11	Trent Richardson	Birmingham Iron
Rushing	Longest run	83	Ja'Quan Gardner	San Diego Fleet
Rushing	Fumbles	6	Josh Woodrum	Salt Lake Stallions
Receiving	Yards	687	Charles Johnson	Orlando Apollos
Receiving	Touchdowns	7	Rashad Ross	Arizona Hotshots
Receiving	Receptions	45	Charles Johnson	Orlando Apollos
Receiving	Longest reception	83	L'Damian Washington	Birmingham Iron
Defense	Tackles	52	DeMarquis Gates	Memphis Express
Defense	Sacks	7.5	Jayrone Elliott	San Antonio Commanders
Defense	Interceptions	4	Ryan Moeller; De'Vante Bausby; Kameron Kelly	San Diego Fleet; San Antonio Commanders; San Diego Fleet
Special teams	Field goals made	14	Nick Rose; Younghoe Koo; Donny Hageman; Elliott Fry	San Antonio Commanders; Atlanta Legends; San Diego Fleet; Orlando Apollos
Special teams	Longest field goal	55	Nick Folk	Arizona Hotshots
Special teams	Punting yards	2,024	Colton Schmidt	Birmingham Iron
Special teams	Longest punt	69	Joseph Zema	San Antonio Commanders

== Officials ==
The league used the eight-official system (with the center judge), also seen in NCAA college football. There were six officiating crews, staffed with officials from FBS conferences.

Referees
No.	Name	FBS conference
2	Reggie Smith	Big 12
9	Tra Blake	ACC
10	John O'Neill	Big Ten
19	James Carter	SEC
81	Brandon Cruse	Big 12
84	Jeff Heaser	ACC

The officiating crews included one former NFL official—Jimmy DeBell, a back judge on the Smith crew—and three former NFL players: Nate Jones (side judge, Cruse crew), Terry Killens (umpire, Blake crew), and Mike Morton (umpire, Cruse crew).

== Broadcasting ==
CBS Sports, Turner Sports and NFL Network served as the Alliance's broadcast partners for the 2019 season. The CBS Sports deal was announced at the time the league launched, while the Turner Sports and NFL Network contracts were announced less than two weeks before the season began.

- CBS Sports carried the two inaugural games (February 9) regionally via the CBS broadcast network, and was due to carry the championship game broadcast nationwide on the same network. CBS later added one conference championship game and one Week 9 regular season game to their schedule, neither of which was played. CBS Sports Network carried a game of the week on Sunday afternoons.
- The Turner Sports contract included one regular season game (February 16) and a conference championship game on TNT, and a Saturday afternoon game of the week on Bleacher Report's live streaming service, B/R Live. The network had the option to change which service it broadcast its games on, with TNT adding three midseason Saturday afternoon games from B/R Live. Had the league survived the full season, B/R Live would have carried a Sunday afternoon game for Week 9, swapping a game with CBS. In Week 10, B/R Live was due to carry the league's one game of the season scheduled for a Friday.
- NFL Network carried the remainder of the league's games, a Saturday night game and a Sunday night game each week.

=== Viewership ===
In millions of viewers

Broadcaster	1	2	3	4	5	6	7	8	Total	Average
CBS	3.3	—	—	—	—	—	—	—	3.3	3.3
NFL Network	0.6	0.4	0.5	0.5	0.3	0.4	DNR	DNR	>3.5	<0.4
NFL Network	—	0.4	0.5	0.4	DNR	DNR	DNR	DNR	>3.5	<0.4
TNT	—	1.0	—	—	0.5	—	0.3	0.5	2.3	0.6
Total	3.9	1.9	1.0	0.9	0.8	0.4	0.3	0.5	>9.2	
Average	1.9	0.6	0.5	0.4	0.4	0.4	0.3	0.5		<0.7

One decimal place is shown in table but three decimal places are used in all calculations. None of CBS Sports Network's broadcasts register in the Nielsen Ratings and thus viewership estimates for those games are not available.

=== Local radio coverage ===
Each AAF team had a local radio partner, and Sirius XM Radio carried a game of the week package.

Local radio coverage
Team	Station	Affiliation	Ref.
Arizona Hotshots	KDUS (AM)	NBC Sports Radio	
Atlanta Legends	WCNN (AM)	Dickey Broadcasting	
Birmingham Iron	WERC (AM)	iHeartMedia	
Memphis Express	KWNW (FM)	iHeartMedia	
Orlando Apollos	WTKS-FM	iHeartMedia	
Salt Lake Stallions	KALL (AM)	ESPN Radio	
San Antonio Commanders	KZDC (AM & FM)	ESPN Radio	
San Diego Fleet	KLSD (AM) / KOGO (AM)	Fox Sports Radio	

== Signees to other professional leagues ==
=== NFL ===
On April 4, the AAF announced players could leave their contracts to sign with NFL teams following the reported suspension of league football operations. The following 99 players signed with NFL teams:

Player	Position	AAF team	Date	NFL team	Ref.
Garrett Gilbert	QB	Orlando Apollos	April 5	Cleveland Browns	
Keith Reaser	CB	Orlando Apollos	April 5	Kansas City Chiefs	
Derron Smith	FS	San Antonio Commanders	April 5	Minnesota Vikings	
Duke Thomas	CB	San Antonio Commanders	April 5	Minnesota Vikings	
Parker Collins	OT	Atlanta Legends	April 5	Carolina Panthers	
Kitt O'Brien	G	Birmingham Iron	April 5	Carolina Panthers	
Alex Barrett	DE	San Diego Fleet	April 5	Oakland Raiders	
J. C. Hassenauer	C	Birmingham Iron	April 5	Pittsburgh Steelers	
Jack Tocho	FS	Birmingham Iron	April 5	Pittsburgh Steelers	
Damontre Moore	DE	San Diego Fleet	April 5	San Francisco 49ers	
Rashad Ross	WR	Arizona Hotshots	April 8	Carolina Panthers	
Brandon Greene	OT	Birmingham Iron	April 8	Carolina Panthers	
Thomas Duarte	TE	Arizona Hotshots	April 8	Carolina Panthers	
T. J. Barnes	DT	Atlanta Legends	April 8	Carolina Panthers	
Andrew Lauderdale	OT	Arizona Hotshots	April 8	Arizona Cardinals	
Jeremiah Poutasi	G	Salt Lake Stallions	April 8	Arizona Cardinals	
Logan Woodside	QB	San Antonio Commanders	April 8	Tennessee Titans	
Keith Towbridge	TE	Atlanta Legends	April 8	Tennessee Titans	
De'Vante Bausby	CB	San Antonio Commanders	April 8	Denver Broncos	
Winston Craig	DT	San Antonio Commanders	April 8	Pittsburgh Steelers	
J. T. Jones	DE	Atlanta Legends	April 8	Pittsburgh Steelers	
Kameron Kelly	CB	San Diego Fleet	April 8	Pittsburgh Steelers	
Andrew Ankrah	LB	Orlando Apollos	April 8	Washington Redskins	
Salesi Uhatafe	G	Salt Lake Stallions	April 8	Washington Redskins	
De'Mornay Pierson-El	WR	Salt Lake Stallions	April 8	Oakland Raiders	
Shakir Soto	DT	San Diego Fleet	April 8	Dallas Cowboys	
Luis Perez	QB	Birmingham Iron	April 9	Philadelphia Eagles	
Greg Ward Jr.	WR	San Antonio Commanders	April 9	Philadelphia Eagles	
Charles Johnson	WR	Orlando Apollos	April 9	Philadelphia Eagles	
Michael Dunn	G	Birmingham Iron	April 9	Miami Dolphins	
Jayrone Elliott	LB	San Antonio Commanders	April 9	Miami Dolphins	
Kenneth Farrow	RB	San Antonio Commanders	April 9	Miami Dolphins	
Jaryd Jones-Smith	OT	San Antonio Commanders	April 9	Miami Dolphins	
Tyrone Holmes	LB	San Antonio Commanders	April 9	Miami Dolphins	
Reece Horn	WR	Memphis Express	April 9	Miami Dolphins	
Joey Mbu	DT	San Antonio Commanders	April 9	Miami Dolphins	
Karter Schult	DE	Salt Lake Stallions	April 9	Minnesota Vikings	
Cole Mazza	LS	Birmingham Iron	April 9	Los Angeles Chargers	
Casey Sayles	DE	Birmingham Iron	April 9	Pittsburgh Steelers	
Brandon Silvers	QB	Memphis Express	April 10	New York Jets	
Cody Brown	SS	Salt Lake Stallions	April 10	Jacksonville Jaguars	
Orion Stewart	FS	San Antonio Commanders	April 10	Tampa Bay Buccaneers	
Greer Martini	LB	Salt Lake Stallions	April 10	Minnesota Vikings	
Jordan Martin	FS	San Diego Fleet	April 10	Minnesota Vikings	
John Wolford	QB	Arizona Hotshots	April 10	Los Angeles Rams	
Henre' Toliver	CB	Salt Lake Stallions	April 11	New York Giants	
DeMarquis Gates	LB	Memphis Express	April 11	Washington Redskins	
Daniel Brunskill	OT	San Diego Fleet	April 12	San Francisco 49ers	
Elliott Fry	K	Orlando Apollos	April 12	Chicago Bears	
Chris Odom	DE	Salt Lake Stallions	April 16	Atlanta Falcons	
Brant Weiss	OT	Arizona Hotshots	April 16	Arizona Cardinals	
Josh Woodrum	QB	Salt Lake Stallions	April 18	Washington Redskins	
Trey Johnson	CB	Birmingham Iron	April 18	Denver Broncos	
Mike Purcell	DT	Salt Lake Stallions	April 22	Denver Broncos	
Ishmael Hyman	WR	Orlando Apollos	April 25	Cleveland Browns	
Jeremiah Kolone	OG	San Diego Fleet	April 29	Los Angeles Rams	
Taylor Bertolet	K	Salt Lake Stallions	April 29	Denver Broncos	
Marcus Baugh	TE	San Diego Fleet	April 30	Carolina Panthers	
Cole Hunt	TE	San Antonio Commanders	April 30	Carolina Panthers	
Ryan Winslow	P	Memphis Express	May 2	Arizona Cardinals	
Aaron Adeoye	LB	Birmingham Iron	May 6	Baltimore Ravens	
Terrell Bonds	CB	Memphis Express	May 6	Baltimore Ravens	
Jalin Marshall	WR	Orlando Apollos	May 7	Oakland Raiders	
Jamar Summers	CB	Birmingham Iron	May 12	Miami Dolphins	
Bug Howard	TE	Atlanta Legends	May 13	Denver Broncos	
Greg Gilmore	DT	Memphis Express	May 13	Pittsburgh Steelers	
Colton Jumper	LB	Memphis Express	May 13	New Orleans Saints	
D'Ernest Johnson	RB	Orlando Apollos	May 16	Cleveland Browns	
Tony Adams	C	Atlanta Legends	May 16	Miami Dolphins	
Austin Larkin	LB	San Antonio Commanders	May 29	Atlanta Falcons	
Sione Teuhema	LB	Arizona Hotshots	June 11	Carolina Panthers	
Montay Crockett	WR	Atlanta Legends	June 11	Oakland Raiders	
Jordan McCray	C	Orlando Apollos	June 13	Chicago Bears	
Obum Gwacham	DE	Arizona Hotshots	June 13	Indianapolis Colts	
Mark Myers	CB	Orlando Apollos	June 13	New York Jets	
Austin Traylor	TE	Salt Lake Stallions	July 22	Detroit Lions	
Daniel Williams	WR	Memphis Express	July 24	Seattle Seahawks	
Isaiah Williams	OG	Atlanta Legends	July 26	Baltimore Ravens	
Amba Etta-Tawo	WR	Birmingham Iron	July 27	New York Giants	
Hugh Thornton	OG	Arizona Hotshots	July 31	Washington Redskins	
Scott Orndoff	TE	Orlando Apollos	July 31	Tampa Bay Buccaneers	
Chris Thompson	WR	Orlando Apollos	August 3	San Francisco 49ers	
Wes Saxton	TE	Birmingham Iron	August 3	Seattle Seahawks	
Tracy Sprinkle	DT	Atlanta Legends	August 3	Cleveland Browns	
Matt Simms	QB	Atlanta Legends	August 3	Atlanta Falcons	
Nick Truesdell	TE	Salt Lake Stallions	August 4	New York Jets	
Malcolm Bunche	OG	Arizona Hotshots	August 5	New York Giants	
Davis Tull	LB	Memphis Express	August 9	Jacksonville Jaguars	
Brandon Barnes	TE	Memphis Express	August 9	Oakland Raiders	
Justin Stockton	RB	Arizona Hotshots	August 10	Detroit Lions	
Akeem Hunt	RB	Orlando Apollos	August 10	Tennessee Titans	
Demetrius Rhaney	C	Memphis Express	August 10	Buffalo Bills	
Ben Johnson	TE	San Diego Fleet	August 14	Los Angeles Chargers	
Cameron Nizialek	P	Atlanta Legends	August 17	Baltimore Ravens	
Scooby Wright	LB	Arizona Hotshots	August 25	New England Patriots	
Siupeli Anau	NT	Arizona Hotshots	August 26	Arizona Cardinals	
Jacob Ohnesorge	C	Arizona Hotshots	August 27	Arizona Cardinals	
Younghoe Koo	K	Atlanta Legends	October 4	New England Patriots	
Nick Folk	K	Arizona Hotshots	October 30	New England Patriots	

Nine players who were under contract with AAF teams at the time the league ceased operations made initial NFL 53-man active rosters on August 31, 2019: offensive tackle Brandon Greene with the Carolina Panthers, quarterback Garrett Gilbert and running back D'Ernest Johnson with the Cleveland Browns, cornerback De'Vante Bausby and defensive tackle Mike Purcell with the Denver Broncos, long snapper Cole Mazza with the Los Angeles Chargers, kicker Taylor Bertolet with the New York Jets, cornerback Kameron Kelly with the Pittsburgh Steelers, and offensive tackle Daniel Brunskill with the San Francisco 49ers.

=== CFL ===
The following players signed with Canadian Football League (CFL) teams:

Player	Position	AAF team	Date	CFL team	Ref.
Terrance Plummer	LB	Orlando Apollos	April 4	Hamilton Tiger-Cats	
Kennan Gilchrist	LB	Salt Lake Stallions	April 17	Toronto Argonauts	
Daniel Braverman	WR	San Antonio Commanders	April 17	Calgary Stampeders	
David Dean	DT	Atlanta Legends	April 23	Hamilton Tiger-Cats	
Leon Johnson	OT	Salt Lake Stallions	April 26	Calgary Stampeders	
Josh Stewart	WR	San Antonio Commanders	April 29	Winnipeg Blue Bombers	
Shay Fields	WR	San Diego Fleet	April 29	Calgary Stampeders	
Nick Temple	LB	San Antonio Commanders	April 30	Winnipeg Blue Bombers	
Kevin Anderson	QB	Orlando Apollos	April 30	Winnipeg Blue Bombers	
Dylan Wynn	DT	Arizona Hotshots	May 8	Hamilton Tiger-Cats	
Josh Huff	WR	Arizona Hotshots	May 8	Calgary Stampeders	
Chris Martin	OT	Orlando Apollos	May 8	Ottawa Redblacks	
Jeremy Faulk	DE	Birmingham Iron	May 10	Saskatchewan Roughriders	
Avery Young	OT	Birmingham Iron	May 13	Hamilton Tiger-Cats	
Darnell Leslie	LB	San Antonio Commanders	May 14	Hamilton Tiger-Cats	
Meffy Koloamatangi	DE	San Diego Fleet	May 15	BC Lions	
Brett Boyko	OT	San Diego Fleet	May 16	BC Lions	
Jonathan Massaquoi	DL	Birmingham Iron	May 17	Calgary Stampeders	
Shaheed Salmon	LB	Birmingham Iron	May 19	Ottawa Redblacks	
Quan Bray	WR	Birmingham Iron	May 19	Montreal Alouettes	
Antonio Simmons	DE	Atlanta Legends	May 20	Montreal Alouettes	
Marquis Bundy	WR	Arizona Hotshots	May 20	BC Lions	
Freddie Bishop	LB	Memphis Express	May 22	Toronto Argonauts	
Ciante Evans	CB	Salt Lake Stallions	May 22	Montreal Alouettes	
Latarius Brady	DT	Memphis Express	May 23	Montreal Alouettes	
Jordan Leslie	WR	Salt Lake Stallions	May 23	Hamilton Tiger-Cats	
Rannell Hall	WR	Orlando Apollos	May 26	Winnipeg Blue Bombers	
Travis Feeney	LB	San Diego Fleet	May 29	Montreal Alouettes	
Jake Bennett	C	Salt Lake Stallions	June 28	Saskatchewan Roughriders	
Earl Okine	DE	Orlando Apollos	July 14	Saskatchewan Roughriders	
Da'Sean Downey	LB	Arizona Hotshots	July 21	Calgary Stampeders	
Anthony Johnson	DE	Memphis Express	August 13	Calgary Stampeders	
Channing Stribling	CB	Memphis Express	September 23	Hamilton Tiger-Cats	
Shaquille Richardson	CB	Arizona Hotshots	October 15	Toronto Argonauts	
Bishop Sankey	RB	San Diego Fleet	October 24	Toronto Argonauts	

The AAF reportedly blocked AAF players from signing with CFL teams, claiming their AAF contracts were "assets in potential bankruptcy proceedings." Plummer, Gilchrist, and Braverman had signed contracts with AAF teams, but had not yet been activated to the roster from their respective teams' rights lists at the time that the AAF suspended football operations. By April 18, CFL players were allowed to sign AAF players.

=== AFL ===
The following players signed with Arena Football League (AFL) teams:

Player	Position	AAF team	Date	AFL team	Ref.
Dwayne Hollis	CB	Atlanta Legends	April 6	Philadelphia Soul	
Joe Powell	S	Birmingham Iron	April 7	Baltimore Brigade	
Anthony Amos	WR	Arizona Hotshots	April 8	Columbus Destroyers	
Daronte Bouldin	G	Memphis Express	April 8	Columbus Destroyers	
Ervin Philips	WR	Atlanta Legends	April 10	Baltimore Brigade	
Malachi Jones	WR	Atlanta Legends	April 10	Albany Empire	
Darius Prince	WR	San Antonio Commanders	April 13	Philadelphia Soul	
Giorgio Newberry	DE	Orlando Apollos	April 15	Washington Valor	
Jordan Thomas	CB	San Antonio Commanders	April 17	Columbus Destroyers	
Antonio Guerad	DT	Orlando Apollos	May 8	Albany Empire	
Saqwan Edwards	CB	Arizona Hotshots	May 8	Baltimore Brigade	
Trenton Thompson	DT	Arizona Hotshots	May 9	Washington Valor	
Fred Lauina	OG	San Antonio Commanders	May 13	Philadelphia Soul	
Tuni Kanuch	OG	Salt Lake Stallions	May 14	Columbus Destroyers	

Wide receiver Malachi Jones received first-team All-Arena, Receiver of the Year, and Offensive Player of the Year honors at the conclusion of the 2019 AFL season, which was also the AFL's final season before shutting down afterwards. Wide receiver Fabian Guerra was named co-Rookie of the Year as well.

=== NAL ===
The following three players signed with National Arena League (NAL) teams:

Player	Position	AAF team	Date	NAL team	Ref.
Corey Crawford	DE	Memphis Express	April 3	Carolina Cobras	
Fabian Guerra	WR	Memphis Express	April 9	Carolina Cobras	
Tre' Jackson	OG	Orlando Apollos	May 17	Massachusetts Pirates	
