= 2011 LSU vs. Alabama football game =

American college football game

2011 LSU vs. Alabama
- "Game of the Century"
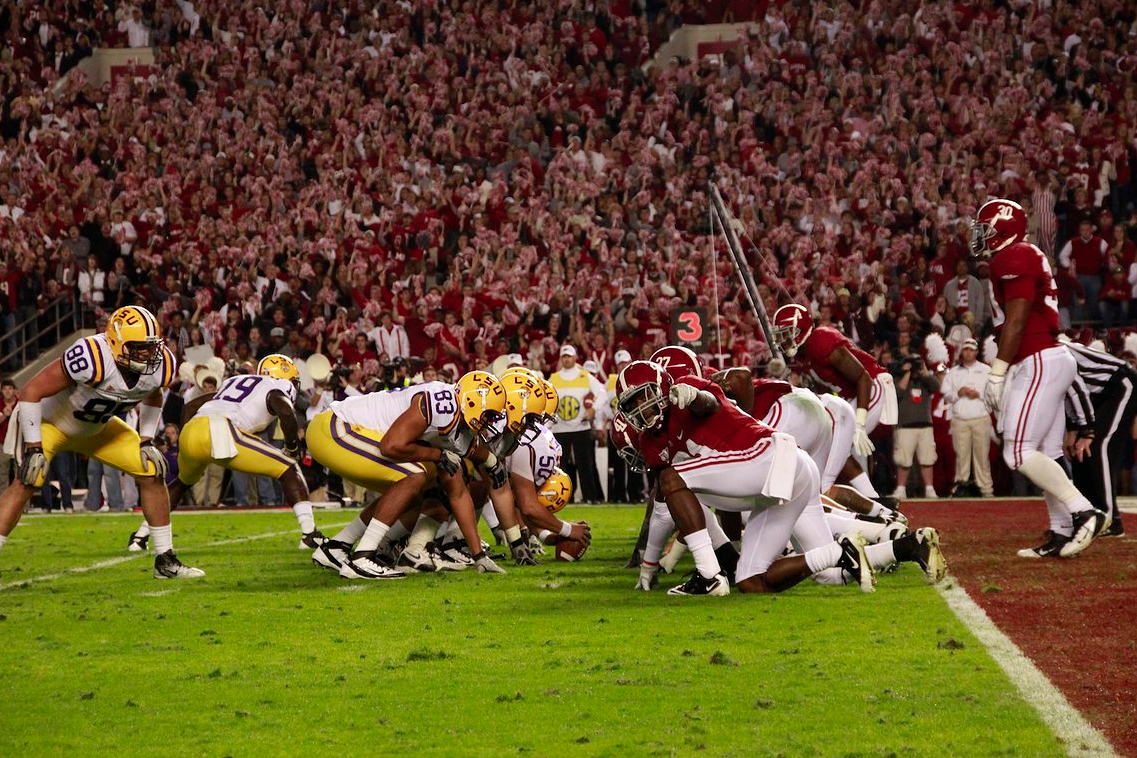
- A moment of the game, with LSU looking to score a field goal
LSU Tigers	Alabama Crimson Tide
(8–0)	(8–0)
9	6
Head coach: Les Miles	Head coach: Nick Saban
AP / Coaches / BCS; 1 / 1 / 1	AP / Coaches / BCS; 2 / 2 / 2
	1	2	3	4	OT	Total
LSU	0	3	0	3	3	9
Alabama	0	3	3	0	0	6
- Date: November 5, 2011
- Season: 2011
- Stadium: Bryant–Denny Stadium
- Location: Tuscaloosa, Alabama
- Favorite: Alabama by 4.5
- Referee: Tom Ritter
- Halftime show: Million Dollar Band
- Attendance: 101,821

United States TV coverage
- Network: CBS
- Announcers: Verne Lundquist (play-by-play); Gary Danielson (color); Tracy Wolfson (sideline)
- Nielsen ratings: 11.5

The 2011 LSU vs. Alabama football game was a regular-season college football game between the unbeaten LSU Tigers (ranked No. 1 in the nation), and the unbeaten Alabama Crimson Tide (ranked No. 2 in the nation) on November 5, 2011, at Bryant–Denny Stadium in Tuscaloosa, Alabama. Coined a "Game of the Century," this was the first time two Southeastern Conference (SEC) football teams came into a regular season matchup undefeated and ranked No. 1 and No. 2 in the nation. In a game dominated by defense and special teams, LSU won in overtime 9–6. LSU kicker Drew Alleman made all 3 of his field goals, while Alabama kickers Jeremy Shelley and Cade Foster made only 2 out of their 6 attempts, proving to be decisive in the game.

LSU and Alabama first met on the field in 1895, and have met annually since 1964. When former LSU head coach Nick Saban was hired in the same capacity at Alabama, their annual contest became, arguably, an even more heated rivalry than before. At the start of the 2011 season, Alabama was ranked No. 2 and LSU was ranked No. 4 in all of the major college polls, and prior to their annual meeting, each team defeated all eight of their opponents, and LSU moved into the No. 1 spot after a victory over West Virginia. Statistically, the game matched two of the top defenses in both the SEC and all of college football.

Alabama received the ball to begin the game. After a scoreless first quarter in which Alabama missed two field goals, both teams scored field goals in the second; Alabama also had another attempt blocked early in the second quarter, that left the score tied 3–3 at halftime. Alabama took a 6–3 lead in the third, but LSU tied the game at 6–6 in the fourth quarter to send the game into overtime. In the overtime period, Alabama missed a 52-yard field goal. LSU then connected on a 25-yard field goal to win the game 9–6.

In the weeks after the game, both teams defeated their remaining opponents, and LSU captured the SEC Championship, after they defeated Georgia 42–10. On December 4, 2011, the final Bowl Championship Series standings were released with LSU ranked No. 1 and Alabama ranked No. 2 to set up a rematch in the 2012 BCS National Championship Game. In the rematch, Alabama defeated LSU 21–0 and captured the 2011 national championship.

== Pre-game buildup ==
LSU and Alabama first met on the field in 1895 and continuously since 1964. Prior to their 2011 game, Alabama held an overall lead in the all-time series with 45 wins to only 24 for LSU and five ties. Historically, LSU's main rival was Tulane and Alabama's were both Auburn and Tennessee. However, when former LSU head coach Nick Saban was hired in the same capacity at Alabama in 2007 season, the Alabama–LSU game became a major rivalry game for each school.

At the beginning of the 2011 season, both teams were ranked in the top five. After Alabama's victory over Arkansas and LSU's over West Virginia on September 24, their November 5 game was viewed by many in the national media as a playoff with the winner advancing to the 2012 BCS National Championship Game. After the week ten polls were released, the game officially became the first college football, regular season No. 1 vs. No. 2 matchup since the 2006 Michigan vs. Ohio State football game, and the first all-time regular season No. 1 vs. No. 2 matchup between SEC conference foes. Due to the No. 1 vs. No. 2 rankings against conference rivals and the hype that led up to the matchup, the game was referred to as the "Game of the Century."

=== LSU ===
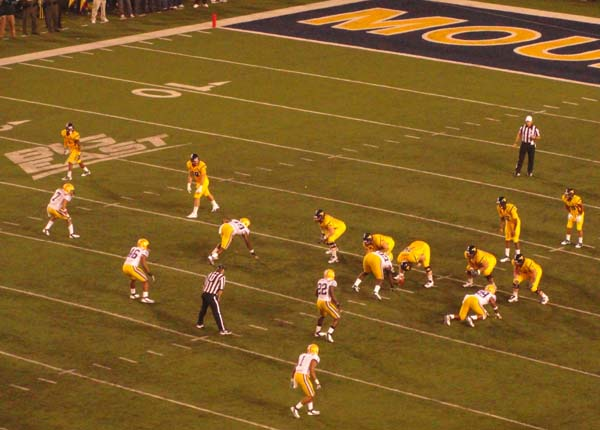
The LSU defense against the West Virginia offense in Week 4.

In the preseason polls, LSU opened the 2011 season as the No. 4 team in both the AP and Coaches' Polls. In week one, the Tigers met the No. 3 Oregon Ducks in the Cowboys Classic. Against the highly regarded Oregon running attack, the LSU defense held the Ducks to less than 100 yards rushing and won the game 40–27. With their win, they moved up to No. 2 and No. 3 in the AP and Coaches' Polls. After they held the Northwestern State Demons of the Football Championship Subdivision to minus 4 yards rushing at Baton Rouge, LSU faced ranked opponents on the road in consecutive weeks against the Mississippi State Bulldogs and the West Virginia Mountaineers. Against the No. 25 Bulldogs, the Tigers only managed to score a single touchdown, but behind a third strong defensive performance won 19–6.

In their third game of the season against a ranked opponent, LSU played their first-ever game against the No. 16 Mountaineers at Morgantown. Although West Virginia was able to outgain the Tigers in total offense 533 to 366 yards, four Mountaineer turnovers resulted in a 47–21 LSU victory. As a result of this win, combined with the other two over ranked opponents, LSU was selected the No. 1 team by the AP following week 5. The Tigers returned home to defeat the Kentucky Wildcats 35–7 in Jordan Jefferson's return from suspension, and then defeated the No. 17 Florida Gators 41–11, also in Death Valley. After their 38–7 victory over the Tennessee Volunteers at Neyland Stadium, the Tigers were selected as the No. 1 team in both the AP and Coaches' Polls for the first time of the season after the Oklahoma Sooners were upset by Texas Tech Red Raiders. The next week, LSU defeated the No. 19 Auburn Tigers 45–10 at home and entered their bye week undefeated and ranked No. 1 for their game against No. 2 Alabama in Tuscaloosa.

Prior to the game against Alabama, LSU's defense was ranked near the top of all major defensive categories nationally. They ranked fourth in total defense (251.38 yards per game), third in scoring (11.5 points per game) and rushing defense (76.63 yards per game) and tenth in passing defense (174.75 yards per game). In the SEC, the Tigers ranked second in total, scoring and rushing defense and fourth in passing defense. Nationally on offense, LSU ranked twelfth in scoring offense (39.25 points per game), 31st in rushing offense (189 yards per game), 81st in total offense (372.13 yards per game) and 99th in passing offense (183.13 yards per game). In the SEC, they ranked second in scoring offense, fourth in rushing offense, sixth in total offense and eighth in passing offense.

=== Alabama ===
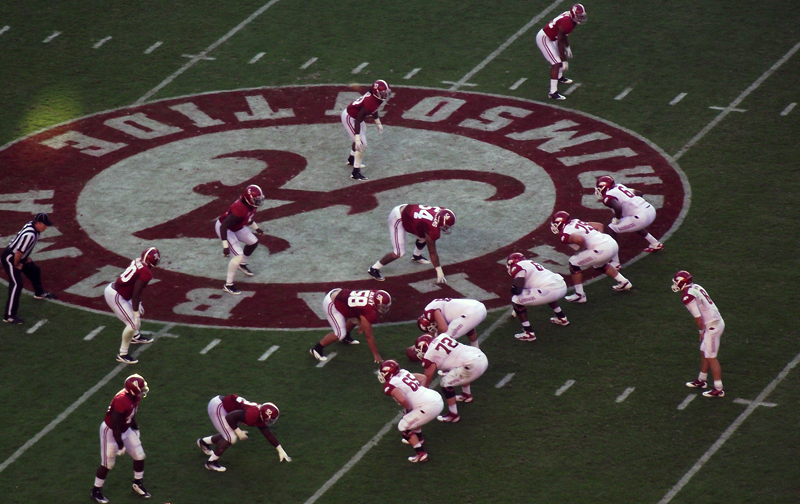
The Alabama defense against the Arkansas offense in Week 4.

In the preseason polls, Alabama opened the 2011 season as the No. 2 ranked team in both the AP and Coaches' Polls. After they defeated the Kent State Golden Flashes 48–7 in the season opener, Alabama dropped to No. 3 in the AP Poll as a result of LSU's victory over Oregon. In Week 2, the Crimson Tide traveled to Beaver Stadium for the first time since 1989 to play the Penn State Nittany Lions. They defeated the No. 23 Nittany Lions 27–11, and returned to Tuscaloosa for a pair of home games against the North Texas Mean Green and the Arkansas Razorbacks. Against North Texas, the Alabama defense was dominant and secured the first shutout for the Crimson Tide defense since the 2009 season with their 41–0 victory. The following week, Alabama opened conference play with a 38–14 victory over No. 14 Arkansas and then defeated the No. 12 Florida Gators 38–10 to extend their record to 5–0. After their victory over Florida, the Crimson Tide regained their No. 2 ranking in the AP Poll.

Alabama then returned home for their homecoming game against the Vanderbilt Commodores. For the second time of the season, the Alabama defense had a shutout in the 34–0 Crimson Tide victory. After a 52–7 win over the Ole Miss Rebels at Vaught–Hemingway Stadium, Alabama returned for their annual Third Saturday in October contest against the Tennessee Volunteers. The Crimson Tide defeated Tennessee for the fifth consecutive season with their 37–6 victory and entered their bye week undefeated and ranked No. 2 for their game against No. 1 LSU in Tuscaloosa.

Prior to the game against LSU, Alabama's defense was ranked at or near the top of all major defensive categories nationally. Both nationally and in the SEC, they ranked first in total (180.5 yards per game), scoring (6.88 points per game) and rushing defense (44.88 yards per game). The Crimson Tide also nationally ranked second, and first in the SEC, in pass defense (135.63 yards per game). Nationally on offense, Alabama ranked eleventh in scoring offense (39.38 points per game), fourteenth in rushing offense (229.25 yards per game), 23rd in total offense (457.63 yards per game) and 63rd in passing offense (228.38 yards per game). In the SEC, they ranked first in total, scoring and rushing offense and fourth in passing offense.

== Game summary ==
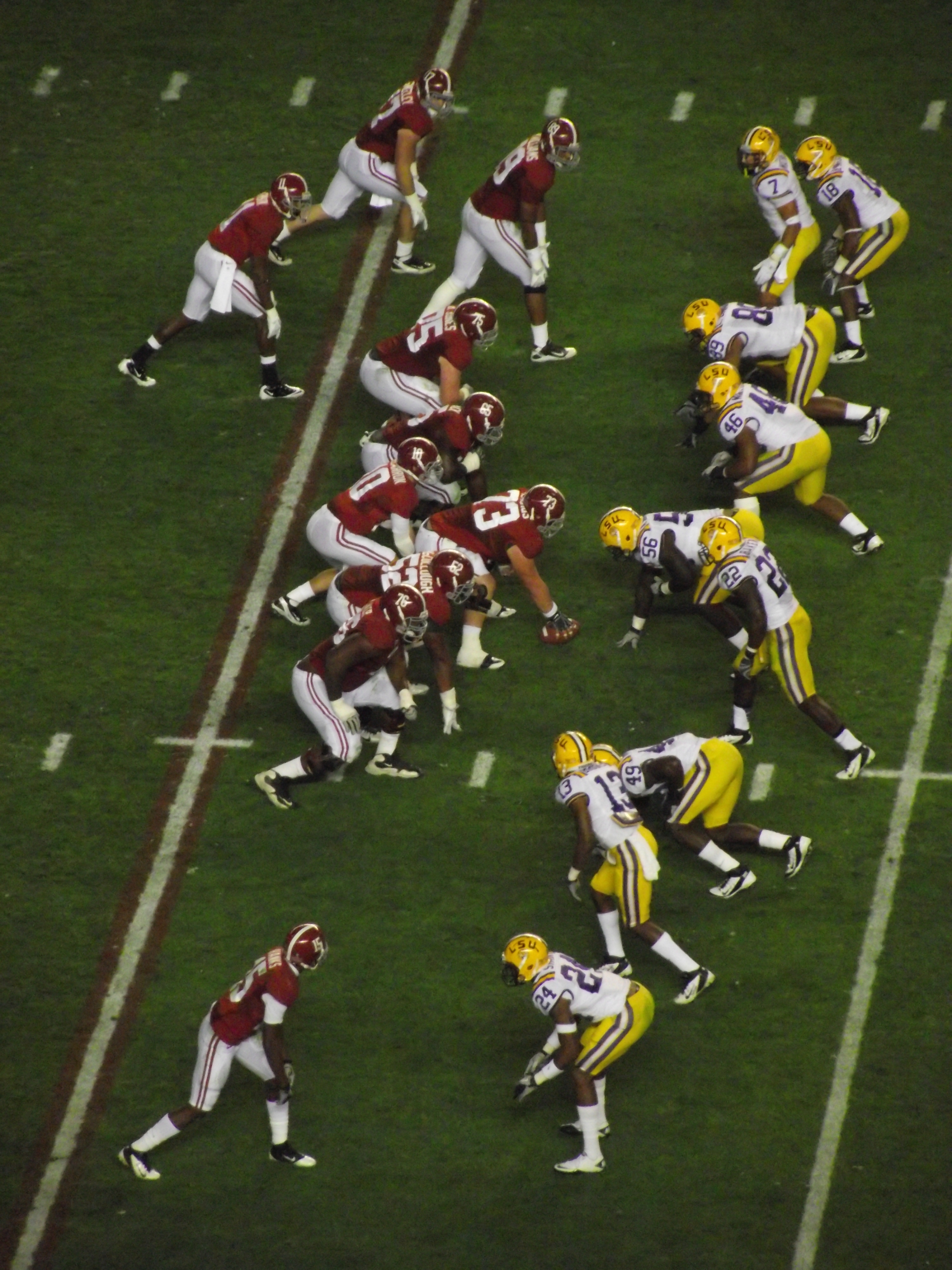
The Alabama offense lined up against the LSU defense.

Originally to air on CBS with a start time of 2:30 p.m. CST, CBS reassigned the game for primetime television at 7:00 p.m. CST as part of a trade announced October 23. The deal with CBS involved swapping games to other networks and gave future scheduling considerations for the 2012 season to ESPN. This was the case as CBS used their allotted SEC primetime slot for the Alabama–Florida game earlier in the season.

The 2011 edition of the Alabama–LSU football rivalry kicked off at 7:14 p.m. CST on November 5, 2011, before a crowd of 101,821 people at Bryant–Denny Stadium, in Tuscaloosa, Alabama. The game was broadcast nationally in prime time on CBS and Verne Lundquist provided the play-by-play commentary, Gary Danielson provided the color commentary and Tracy Wolfson served as the sideline reporter. An estimated 20 million people watched the game's television broadcast on CBS, and the broadcast earned a television rating of 11.5, the highest rating for a non-bowl, college football telecast on CBS since 1989.

=== First quarter ===
After winning the coin toss, Alabama elected to receive the ball to open the first half. Marquis Maze fielded the James Hairston kickoff and returned it to the Alabama 30-yard line where the offense began its first series. Alabama opened with a pair of gains by Trent Richardson on an 18-yard run and on a 22-yard pass reception from A. J. McCarron to reach the LSU 30-yard line. However, the drive stalled on the next three plays, and on fourth down Cade Foster missed a 44-yard field goal wide right and the game remained tied at zero. The Tigers began their first offensive series with Jarrett Lee at quarterback from their own 27-yard line. After LSU gained a pair of first downs on runs by Spencer Ware and short passes from Lee, the drive faltered, and Brad Wing punted the ball out-of-bounds at the Alabama five.

Alabama started their second drive with a short gain and an incompletion, and then McCarron then threw a 19-yard pass to Maze for a first down. The Crimson Tide gained another pair of first downs with a Maze reception and three runs each from Richardson and Eddie Lacy before the drive stalled at the LSU 33. Again Foster missed a field goal, this time from 50-yards, and the game remained tied at zero. On the next LSU possession, Ware had a short gain and Lee completed a short pass to Russell Shepard before he threw an interception to Robert Lester at the Alabama 47-yard line. The Crimson Tide then began their third offensive series with a 19-yard completion from McCarron to Darius Hanks before the end of the first quarter.

=== Second quarter ===
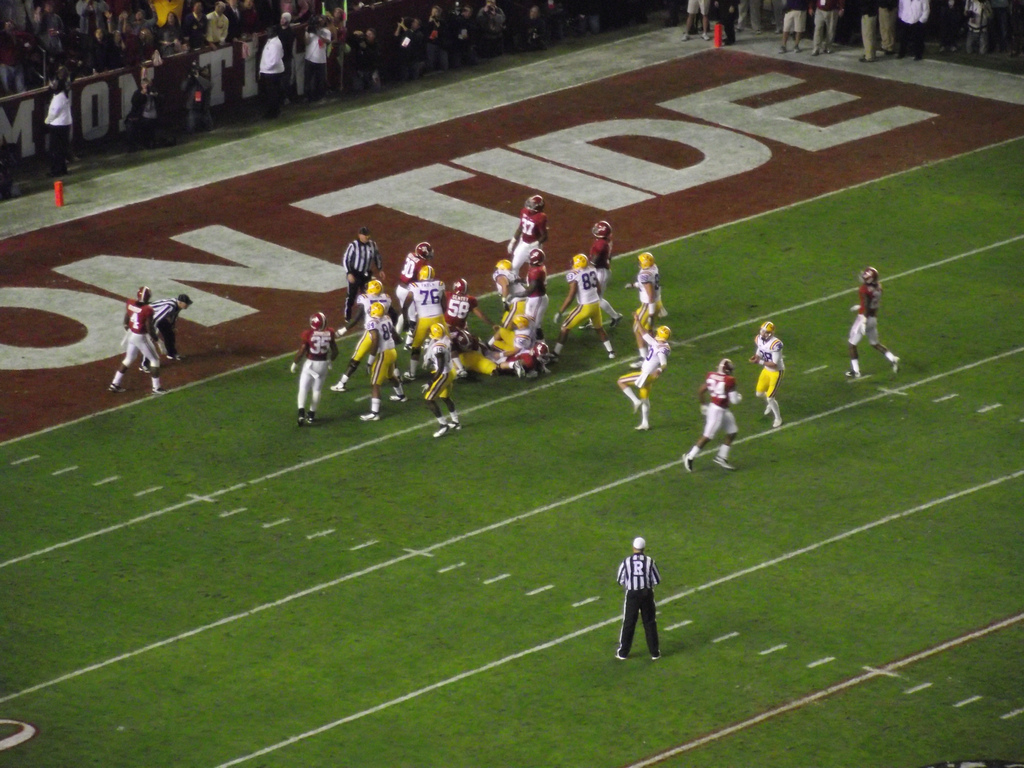
Drew Alleman after he kicked his 19-yard field goal to tie the game at 3–3.

After a ten-yard gain by Richardson to start the quarter, Alabama lost a total of seven yards on consecutive plays and a McCarron incompletion on third down set up a third long field goal attempt. This time the 49-yard attempt from Jeremy Shelley was blocked by Bennie Logan and recovered by Eric Reid who returned it to the Alabama 48. On this LSU possession, Jordan Jefferson took over as the Tigers' quarterback, and LSU gained a first down on a six-yard Michael Ford run and a pair of short runs by Ware. However, the drive stalled again and Wing was forced to punt for LSU.

Alabama started from their own four, and Lacy had a short gain before Richardson had four consecutive runs to move the ball to the 39-yard line. The next play was Alabama's longest play from scrimmage in the game when McCarron threw a 39-yard pass to Richardson and brought the ball to the LSU 19-yard line. However, for the fourth time in four offensive possessions, the LSU defense held Alabama to a field goal attempt. This time, the 34-yard Jeremy Shelley kick was good and the Crimson Tide took a 3–0 lead. Once the received the kickoff, LSU began their fourth offensive possession from their own 24. The Tigers opened their drive with runs of 14 and nine yards from Ford, followed by short runs from Ware, Jefferson and Ford again to bring the ball to the Alabama 36. After a five-yard substitution penalty, Jefferson completed a 34-yard pass to Russell Shepard to give the Tigers a first and goal from the Alabama eight. After a four-yard rush by Ford and a Jefferson incompletion, Dre Kirkpatrick was called for holding that resulted in a first and goal from the Alabama two-yard line. Jefferson then threw another incompletion followed with a run for no gain by Ford. LSU then called a time-out with two seconds left in the half to set up a field goal attempt, and Alabama followed with a second time-out in an attempt to ice the kicker. Drew Alleman then kicked a 19-yard field goal as time expired to tie the game at 3–3 at halftime.

=== Third quarter ===
LSU received the ball to start the second half and started their fifth offensive drive from their own 18. After they gained a first down on a short pass on a pair of runs, the Alabama defense stopped the Tigers on their next series to force a punt. Alabama then started from their own 48, but were only able to muster a three and out. This resulted in their first punt of the night from Cody Mandell. With Lee back at quarterback for LSU, he threw his second interception, this time to Mark Barron, to give Alabama possession at the LSU 35. Again the LSU defense held the Alabama offense in check to set up another long field goal attempt. This time Foster connected on a 46-yard field goal to give the Crimson Tide a 6–3 lead. On the next drive, LSU was able to gain a pair of first downs primarily with only runs by Jefferson and Ford, but again were forced to punt. Alabama started this drive from their own 11, and was able to gain a pair of first downs on McCarron passes before he threw an interception to Morris Claiborne that was returned to the Alabama 15. The quarter ended two plays later after a pair of LSU runs resulted in no gain.

=== Fourth quarter ===
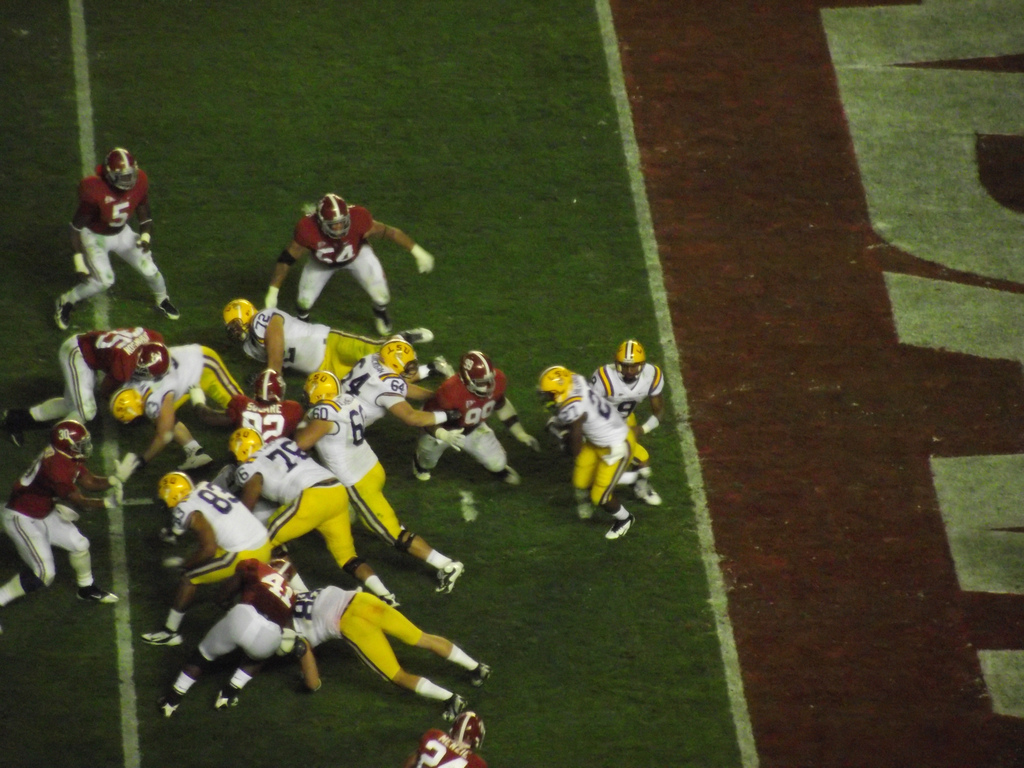
Kenny Hilliard receiving the Jordan Jefferson handoff and rushing away from the LSU end zone.

After a two-yard Jefferson run to open the fourth quarter, Alleman kicked a 30-yard field goal to tie the game at 6–6. Alabama began the next series with a two-yard Richardson reception followed by a two-yard run before McCarron connected with Maze for a first down on an 18-yard reception. Richardson then had a three-yard run and a 24-yard run to give the Crimson Tide a first down at the LSU 28. On the next play, Maze threw an interception on a trick play to Reid at the LSU one-yard line to give the Tigers possession. After Alabama held LSU to a three-and-out, Wing had a 73-yard punt to give Alabama possession at their own 18. Alabama and LSU then traded punts on the next three offensive possessions to send the game into overtime tied 6–6.

=== Overtime ===
In the overtime period, Alabama was on offense first. McCarron opened their drive with a pair of incompletions to Richardson. After a five-yard substitution penalty and a five-yard quarterback sack by Sam Montgomery, Foster missed a 52-yard field goal. On LSU's possession, Ware had a three-yard rush and then Ford had a 15-yard run to give the Tigers a first down from the Alabama seven. After a pair of runs that netted a loss of one yard, on third down, Alleman kicked a 25-yard field goal to give LSU the 9–6 victory.

=== Scoring summary ===
Scoring summary

Quarter	Time	Drive			Team	Scoring information	Score	
Quarter	Time	Plays	Yards	TOP	Team	Scoring information	LSU	ALA
2	3:53	10	79	5:00	ALA	34-yard field goal by Jeremy Shelley	0	3
2	0:00	11	74	3:53	LSU	19-yard field goal by Drew Alleman	3	3
3	7:56	4	6	1:51	ALA	46-yard field goal by Cade Foster	3	6
4	14:13	4	2	1:53	LSU	30-yard field goal by Drew Alleman	6	6
OT	–	5	17	0:00	LSU	25-yard field goal by Drew Alleman	9	6
"TOP" = time of possession. For other American football terms, see Glossary of American football.							9	6

== Statistical summary ==
Statistical comparison
	LSU	Alabama
1st downs	15	17
Total yards	239	295
Passing yards	91	199
Rushing yards	148	96
Penalties	7–56	6–73
3rd down conversions	3–11	5–13
Turnovers	2	2
Time of Possession	29:54	30:06

In a game noted for dominant defense performances for both teams, offensively, both Alabama and LSU had similar statistics. The Crimson Tide compiled 295 yards of total offense as compared to LSU's 239 yards. Alabama quarterback A. J. McCarron completed 16 of 28 passes for 199 passing yards. His top receiver in the game was Trent Richardson who had 80 yards on 5 receptions, followed by Marquis Maze with 61 yards on 6 receptions.

Jarrett Lee entered the game as the Tigers' starting quarterback. However, after he threw a pair of interceptions, Lee was replaced by Jordan Jefferson for the remainder of the game. In the game, Lee completed 3 of 7 passes for 24 yards and Jefferson completed 6 of 10 passes for 67 yards. The Tigers top receiver in the game was Russell Shepard who had 39 yards on 2 receptions.

In terms of rushing offense, LSU outgained Alabama 148 to 96 yards, led by Michael Ford who ran for 72 rushing yards. The Crimson Tide was led on the ground by Richardson, who carried the ball 23 times for 89 yards. LSU, was led by Ford's 72 rushing yards, and also saw Jefferson rush for 43 yards on 11 carries and Spencer Ware pick up 29 yards on 16 carries.

Defensively, Nico Johnson led Alabama with eleven total tackles in the game, followed by DeQuan Menzie with eight. Mark Barron and Robert Lester each had one interception and Courtney Upshaw accounted for the Crimson Tide's only quarterback sack of the game. For LSU, Ryan Baker led the Tigers with eight total tackles in the game, followed by both Eric Reid and Sam Montgomery who each had six. Reid and Morris Claiborne each had one interception and Montgomery accounted for both of LSU's quarterback sacks.

== Aftermath ==
=== LSU ===
With the victory, LSU remained atop all three polls at No. 1. They also took a one-game lead in the SEC Western Division standings over Alabama, and ultimately secured a place in the 2011 SEC Championship Game. The Tigers went on to finish the regular season 12–0 with victories over Western Kentucky, Ole Miss and Arkansas. In the SEC Championship, LSU rallied from an early double-digit deficit to defeat Georgia and won the conference championship, retained their unanimous No. 1 ranking and secured a place in the BCS National Championship Game.

Statistically, LSU's defense was still ranked near the top of all major defensive categories nationally after the game against Alabama. They moved up to second in both scoring (10.89 points per game) and rushing defense (78.78 yards per game), third in total defense (256.22 yards per game) and ninth in passing defense (177.44 yards per game). The Tigers remained ranked second in total, scoring and rushing defense and fourth in passing defense within the conference. On offense, the Tigers dropped to 20th in scoring offense (35.89 points per game), 38th in rushing offense (184.44 yards per game), 87th in total offense (357.33 yards per game) and 102nd in passing offense (172.89 yards per game). In conference, they remained second in scoring offense, sixth in total offense, eighth in passing offense, but dropped to fifth in rushing offense.

=== Alabama ===
With the loss, Alabama dropped to No. 4 in both the AP and Coaches' Polls and to No. 3 in the BCS standings. The Crimson Tide went on to finish the regular season 11–1 with victories over Mississippi State, Georgia Southern and Auburn. During these final weeks, a series of upsets occurred that allowed Alabama to remain in contention for the final No. 2 ranking, and thus to qualify for the BCS National Championship Game. Alabama secured a place in the BCS National Championship Game after they completed the regular season ranked No. 2 with a BCS score of .942, slightly ahead of Oklahoma State with a BCS score of .933. The .09 difference between the teams was the closest final BCS ranking between No. 2 and No. 3 ranked teams since the current BCS formula was instituted in 2004.

Statistically, Alabama's defense was ranked at the top of all major defensive categories nationally after the game against LSU. They still ranked first in total (187.00 yards per game), scoring (7.11 points per game) and rushing defense (56.33 yards per game), and moved up to first in pass defense (130.67 yards per game). Alabama remained the conference leader in all four major categories as well. On offense, the Crimson Tide dropped to 23rd in scoring offense (35.67 points per game), 21st in rushing offense (214.44 yards per game), 30th in total offense (439.56 yards per game) and 68th in passing offense (225.11 yards per game). In conference, Alabama remained first in rushing and fourth in passing offense, but dropped to second in total and third in scoring offense.

=== Rematch ===
On December 4, 2011, the final Bowl Championship Series standings were unveiled with LSU ranked first, followed by Alabama, to set up a rematch between the two teams in the 2012 BCS National Championship Game. In the weeks that led up to the game, the notion of a split national championship became a major storyline. This was the case as the AP Poll is not tied to the Bowl Championship Series and some AP voters expressed they might vote LSU national champions even if they lost as they defeated Alabama in their regular season game. However, after Alabama shut out LSU 21–0 in the BCS National Championship Game, the AP voted them national champions to give the Crimson Tide the consensus national championship and thus avoid a split title with LSU.

=== Players drafted in the NFL ===
Within the next four years, 45 players that participated in this game were taken into the NFL draft. This represents the highest number of players taken in a regular season game and represents the second highest number of players taken into the NFL Draft from both of the teams that participated, second only to the 2003 Fiesta Bowl which produced 52 future draft picks. The final pick came with the 253rd selection on the 2015 NFL draft, which saw the New England Patriots take Xzavier Dickson, three selections before the final "Mr. Irrelevant" pick. The following table lists all of the participants from the 2011 LSU vs. Alabama game that were later drafted by an NFL team:

Year	Round	Overall	Player name	College	Position	Drafted by
2012	1	3	Trent Richardson	Alabama	Running back	Cleveland Browns
2012	1	6	Morris Claiborne	LSU	Cornerback	Dallas Cowboys
2012	1	7	Mark Barron	Alabama	Safety	Tampa Bay Buccaneers
2012	1	14	Michael Brockers	LSU	Defensive tackle	St. Louis Rams
2012	1	17	Dre Kirkpatrick	Alabama	Cornerback	Cincinnati Bengals
2012	1	25	Dont'a Hightower	Alabama	Linebacker	New England Patriots
2012	2	35	Courtney Upshaw	Alabama	Linebacker	Baltimore Ravens
2012	2	63	Rueben Randle	LSU	Wide receiver	New York Giants
2012	3	73	Brandon Taylor	LSU	Safety	San Diego Chargers
2012	4	124	Ron Brooks	LSU	Cornerback	Buffalo Bills
2012	5	136	Josh Chapman	Alabama	Defensive tackle	Indianapolis Colts
2012	5	146	DeQuan Menzie	Alabama	Cornerback	Kansas City Chiefs
2012	7	247	Brad Smelley	Alabama	Tight end	Cleveland Browns
2013	1	6	Barkevious Mingo	LSU	Defensive end	Cleveland Browns
2013	1	9	Dee Milliner	Alabama	Cornerback	New York Jets
2013	1	10	Chance Warmack	Alabama	Guard	Tennessee Titans
2013	1	11	D. J. Fluker	Alabama	Offensive tackle	San Diego Chargers
2013	1	18	Eric Reid	LSU	Safety	San Francisco 49ers
2013	2	45	Kevin Minter	LSU	Linebacker	Arizona Cardinals
2013	2	61	Eddie Lacy	Alabama	Running back	Green Bay Packers
2013	3	67	Bennie Logan	LSU	Defensive tackle	Philadelphia Eagles
2013	3	69	Tyrann Mathieu	LSU	Cornerback	Arizona Cardinals
2013	3	95	Sam Montgomery	LSU	Defensive end	Houston Texans
2013	4	99	Nico Johnson	Alabama	Linebacker	Kansas City Chiefs
2013	4	113	Barrett Jones	Alabama	Center	St. Louis Rams
2013	5	137	Jesse Williams	Alabama	Defensive tackle	Seattle Seahawks
2013	5	138	Tharold Simon	LSU	Cornerback	Seattle Seahawks
2013	5	142	Lavar Edwards	LSU	Defensive end	Tennessee Titans
2013	5	157	Quinton Dial	Alabama	Defensive end	San Francisco 49ers
2013	6	194	Spencer Ware	LSU	Running back	Seattle Seahawks
2013	7	211	Michael Williams	Alabama	Tight end	Detroit Lions
2014	1	12	Odell Beckham Jr.	LSU	Wide receiver	New York Giants
2014	1	17	C. J. Mosley	Alabama	Linebacker	Baltimore Ravens
2014	1	21	Ha Ha Clinton-Dix	Alabama	Safety	Green Bay Packers
2014	2	51	Ego Ferguson	LSU	Defensive tackle	Chicago Bears
2014	2	63	Jarvis Landry	LSU	Wide receiver	Miami Dolphins
2014	4	123	Kevin Norwood	Alabama	Wide receiver	Seattle Seahawks
2014	5	156	Lamin Barrow	LSU	Linebacker	Denver Broncos
2014	5	160	Ed Stinson	Alabama	Defensive end	Arizona Cardinals
2014	5	164	A. J. McCarron	Alabama	Quarterback	Cincinnati Bengals
2014	5	167	Vinnie Sunseri	Alabama	Safety	New Orleans Saints
2014	6	181	Alfred Blue	LSU	Running back	Houston Texans
2015	4	108	Jalston Fowler	Alabama	Running back	Tennessee Titans
2015	7	235	Kenny Hilliard	LSU	Running back	Houston Texans
2015	7	253	Xzavier Dickson	Alabama	Linebacker	New England Patriots
