= List of South Alabama Jaguars in the NFL draft =

This is a list of South Alabama Jaguars football players in the NFL draft.

== Key ==
B	Back	K	Kicker	NT	Nose tackle
C	Center	LB	Linebacker	FB	Fullback
DB	Defensive back	P	Punter	HB	Halfback
DE	Defensive end	QB	Quarterback	WR	Wide receiver
DT	Defensive tackle	RB	Running back	G	Guard
E	End	T	Offensive tackle	TE	Tight end

= Pro Bowler
= Hall of Famer

== Selections ==
Year	Round	Pick	Overall	Player	Team	Position
2017	2	13	44	Gerald Everett	Los Angeles Rams	TE
2021	7	27	255	Kawaan Baker	New Orleans Saints	WR
2022	3	24	88	Jalen Tolbert	Dallas Cowboys	WR
2023	5	20	155	Darrell Luter Jr.	San Francisco 49ers	DB

== Notable undrafted players ==
Note: No drafts held before 1920

Debut year	Player name	Position	Debut NFL/AFL team	Notes
2011	Courtney Smith	WR	New York Jets	
2015	Wes Saxton	TE	New York Jets	
2016	Braedon Bowman	TE	Jacksonville Jaguars	
2018	Jeremy Reaves	S	Philadelphia Eagles	Pro Bowl (2022)
2020	Corliss Waitman	P	Pittsburgh Steelers	
2023	Jalen Wayne	WR	Buffalo Bills	
2024	Carter Bradley	QB	Las Vegas Raiders	
2024	Lincoln Sefcik	TE	New York Jets	
2024	Jamie Sheriff	LB	Seattle Seahawks	
2025	Jamaal Pritchett	WR	New York Jets	
2025	DJ Thomas-Jones	TE	Pittsburgh Steelers	
2025	Bubba Thomas	DL	Seattle Seahawks	
2025	Jeremiah Webb	WR	New England Patriots	
2026	Kentrel Bullock	RB	Cincinnati Bengals	
