= JaCorey =

JaCorey is a masculine given name. Notable people with the name include:

- JaCorey Shepherd (born 1993), American football player
- JaCorey Williams (born 1994), American basketball player
- Ja'Corey Brooks (born 2001), American football player

== See also ==
- Jacory
