= Trovon Reed =

American football player (born 1990)

USC Trojans
- Title: Cornerbacks coach

Personal information
- Born: December 30, 1990 (age 35); Thibodaux, Louisiana, U.S.
- Listed height: 6 ft 0 in (1.83 m)
- Listed weight: 191 lb (87 kg)

Career information
- High school: Thibodaux
- College: Auburn
- NFL draft: 2015: undrafted

Career history

Playing
- Seattle Seahawks (2015)*; St. Louis Rams (2015)*; Miami Dolphins (2015)*; Seattle Seahawks (2015–2016)*; San Diego Chargers (2016); Seattle Seahawks (2017)*; San Francisco 49ers (2017–2018)*; Seattle Seahawks (2018)*; Birmingham Iron (2019); St. Louis BattleHawks (2020)*; Tampa Bay Vipers (2020); St. Louis BattleHawks (2020)
- * Offseason or practice squad member only

Coaching
- Auburn (2021) Player relations coordinator; Auburn (2022–2023) Director of football & player relations; UCF (2024) Cornerbacks coach; USC (2025–present) Cornerbacks coach

Career NFL statistics
- Total tackles: 14
- Pass deflections: 3
- Interceptions: 2
- Stats at Pro Football Reference

Trovon Reed (born December 30, 1990) is an American former professional football cornerback who is currently the cornerbacks coach for the USC Trojans. Reed spent time playing for several teams in the National Football League (NFL). He also played college football at Auburn.

== Early life ==
Reed attended Thibodaux High School in Thibodaux, Louisiana where he graduated in 2010.

== College career ==
Coming out of high school, Reed committed to play football at Auburn University. Reed played games in five different years, spending the first four years at wide receiver and switched to cornerback for his senior season. Reed used a medical redshirt his freshman season due to a knee injury. Reed was eligible for a medical redshirt due to only playing in one game that season. Reed finished his career with 14 total tackles and 3 interceptions. Reed is a 2x SEC Champion (2010, 2013) and a 1x National Champion (2010).

== Professional career ==
=== Seattle Seahawks ===
On May 2, 2015, after going undrafted, Reed signed an undrafted free agent deal with the Seattle Seahawks.

=== St. Louis Rams ===
On August 4, 2015, Reed signed with the St. Louis Rams replacing Devon Wylie on the 90 man roster. On September 5, 2015, Reed was waived from the Rams roster as they trimmed their roster down to 53 players. The following day the Rams signed Reed to their practice squad. On September 15, 2015, Reed was released from the Rams' practice squad.

=== Miami Dolphins ===
On October 20, 2015, Reed was signed to the Miami Dolphins' practice squad. On November 2, 2015, the Dolphins cut Reed from their practice squad.

=== Seattle Seahawks (second stint) ===
On November 17, 2015, Reed was signed to the Seattle Seahawks' practice squad. On January 18, 2016, Reed signed a futures contract with the Seattle Seahawks. On August 30, 2016, he was waived/injured by the Seahawks and placed on injured reserve. On September 3, 2016, he was released from the Seahawks' injured reserve.

=== San Diego Chargers ===
On October 26, 2016, Reed was signed to the Chargers' practice squad. He was promoted to the active roster on November 22, 2016. In Week 14 against the Carolina Panthers, Reed recorded an 100-yard interception off of Cam Newton. He was waived on September 2, 2017.

=== Seattle Seahawks (third stint) ===
On November 14, 2017, Reed was again signed to the Seattle Seahawks' practice squad. He was released on December 12, 2017.

=== San Francisco 49ers ===
On December 20, 2017, Reed was signed to the San Francisco 49ers practice squad. He signed a reserve/future contract with the 49ers on January 2, 2018. He was waived on June 4, 2018.

=== Seattle Seahawks (fourth stint) ===
On July 27, 2018, Reed signed with the Seattle Seahawks. He was waived on September 1, 2018.

=== Birmingham Iron ===
In 2019, Reed joined the Birmingham Iron of the Alliance of American Football. He was placed on injured reserve on March 28, 2019. The league ceased operations in April 2019.

=== St. Louis BattleHawks ===
In October 2019, Reed was selected by the St. Louis BattleHawks as part of the 2020 XFL draft. He was placed on injured reserve before the start of the season on January 21, 2020. He was waived by the BattleHawks and claimed by the Tampa Bay Vipers on February 27, 2020, and traded back to the BattleHawks the next day in exchange for defensive tackle Kellen Soulek. He had his contract terminated when the league suspended operations on April 10, 2020.
