= Casey Sayles =

American gridiron football player (born 1995)

- Sayles with the BC Lions in 2026

No. 2 – BC Lions
- Position: Defensive tackle
- Roster status: Active
- CFL status: American

Personal information
- Born: September 4, 1995 (age 31); Omaha, Nebraska, U.S.
- Listed height: 6 ft 3 in (1.91 m)
- Listed weight: 290 lb (132 kg)

Career information
- High school: Omaha North
- College: Ohio Bobcats (2013–2016)
- NFL draft: 2017: undrafted

Career history
- 2017: Los Angeles Rams*
- 2018: Pittsburgh Steelers*
- 2019: Birmingham Iron
- 2019: Pittsburgh Steelers*
- 2020: St. Louis BattleHawks
- 2021–2022: Winnipeg Blue Bombers
- 2023–2025: Hamilton Tiger-Cats
- 2026–present: BC Lions
- * Offseason or practice squad member only

Awards and highlights
- Grey Cup champion (2021); CFL All-Star (2023); CFL East All-Star (2023, 2025)
- Stats at Pro Football Reference
- Stats at CFL.ca

Casey Sayles (born September 4, 1995) is an American professional football defensive tackle for the BC Lions of the Canadian Football League (CFL). He played college football with the Ohio Bobcats.

== Early life ==
Sayles attended Omaha North High School in Omaha, Nebraska. As a senior, Sayles compiled 36 solo tackles and 40 assists, with 19 tackles for loss for 71 yards, including 4 1/2 sacks. He also registered four pass breakups, and while playing tight end, he caught nine passes for 145 yards and two touchdowns. He helped Omaha North reach the Class A championship game and was named to the All-Nebraska team. Sayles signed with the Ohio Bobcats out of high school.

== College career ==
Sayles played defensive line for the Ohio Bobcats from 2013 to 2016. In 2013, he also played special teams and returned 4 kicks for a total of 30 yards. In 2014, he played in only seven games. In his senior season in 2016, Sayles has 33 tackles and six sacks, earning Second-team All-Mid-American Conference honors. He finished his four year college career with 111 total tackles and 12.5 sacks and three fumble recoveries in 50 games.

=== Statistics ===
						Tackles					Def Int					Fumbles			
Year	School	Conf	Class	Pos	G	Solo	Ast	Tot	Loss	Sk	Int	Yds	Avg	TD	PD	FR	Yds	TD	FF
*2013	Ohio	MAC	FR	DL	11	14	18	32	5.0	3.5	0	0	0	0	0	0	0	0	0
2014	Ohio	MAC	SO	DL	7	7	12	19	2.0	0.5	0	0	0	0	0	1	0	0	0
*2015	Ohio	MAC	JR	DL	13	9	18	27	6.0	2.5	0	0	0	0	3	1	0	0	0
*2016	Ohio	MAC	SR	DL	14	17	15	32	6.5	5.0	0	0	0	0	3	1	0	0	0
Career	Ohio				45	47	63	110	19.5	11.5	0	0	0	0	6	3	0	0	0
*indicates bowl stats included. Reference

== Professional career ==
Pre-draft measurables
Height	Weight	Arm length	Hand span	Wingspan	40-yard dash	10-yard split	20-yard split	20-yard shuttle	Three-cone drill	Vertical jump	Broad jump	Bench press
6 ft 3 7/8 in (1.93 m)	289 lb (131 kg)	31 1/2 in (0.80 m)	9 7/8 in (0.25 m)	6 ft 5 3/4 in (1.97 m)	4.99 s	1.75 s	2.85 s	4.56 s	7.37 s	31.0 in (0.79 m)	8 ft 8 in (2.64 m)	30 reps
All values from Pro Day

=== Los Angeles Rams ===
On May 3, 2017, Sayles was signed by the Los Angeles Rams as an undrafted free agent. He was released by the team on September 3, 2017.

=== Pittsburgh Steelers (first stint) ===
On January 18, 2018, the Pittsburgh Steelers signed Sayles to a Reserve/Future contract. He had four tackles in four preseason games. On September 1, 2018, he was waived.

=== Birmingham Iron ===
In 2019, Sayles played for the Birmingham Iron of the Alliance of American Football (AAF). According to Pro Football Focus, he was one of the best defensive lineman in the league on a per-snap basis. The league ceased operations in April 2019.

=== Pittsburgh Steelers (second stint) ===
On April 9, 2019, the Steelers signed Sayles to a one-year contract. On August 30, 2019, he was released.

=== St. Louis BattleHawks ===
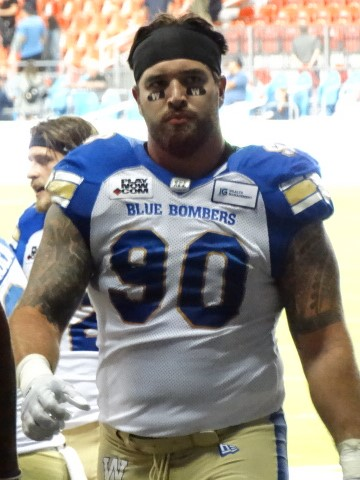
Sayles with the Winnipeg Blue Bombers in 2022

In October 2019, Sayles was drafted by the St. Louis BattleHawks via the 2020 XFL draft. He was picked up in the first round of Phase 3: Defensive Front Seven. He had his contract terminated when the league suspended operations on April 10, 2020.

=== Winnipeg Blue Bombers ===
Sayles signed with the Winnipeg Blue Bombers of the CFL on April 5, 2021. He played for two seasons with the Blue Bombers where he won a Grey Cup in 2021 and became a free agent upon the expiry of his contract on February 14, 2023.

=== Hamilton Tiger-Cats ===
On February 15, 2023, it was announced that Sayles had signed with the Hamilton Tiger-Cats. On November 8, 2023, Sayles was named a CFL All-Star, after leading the team in quarterback sacks and tackles for loss. On January 8, 2026, Sayles was released by the Tiger-Cats after having spent three seasons with the team.

=== BC Lions ===
On January 13, 2026, Sayles signed a two-year contract with the BC Lions.
