= L'Damian Washington =

American gridiron football player and coach (born 1991)

Ole Miss Rebels
- Title: Wide receivers coach

Personal information
- Born: May 10, 1991 (age 35); Shreveport, Louisiana
- Listed height: 6 ft 4 in (1.93 m)
- Listed weight: 216 lb (98 kg)

Career information
- High school: Green Oaks (Shreveport, Louisiana)
- College: Missouri
- NFL draft: 2014: undrafted

Career history

Playing
- Dallas Cowboys (2014)*; San Francisco 49ers (2014)*; New York Giants (2014)*; Cleveland Browns (2014)*; Miami Dolphins (2014)*; Pittsburgh Steelers (2015)*; Kansas City Chiefs (2015)*; Edmonton Eskimos (2016)*; Winnipeg Blue Bombers (2017); Birmingham Iron (2019); St. Louis BattleHawks (2020)
- * Offseason or practice squad member only

Coaching
- West MS (MO) (2018–2019) Head coach; Southern (2021) Wide receivers coach; Oklahoma (2022) Wide receivers coach; South Florida (2023) Wide receivers coach; South Florida (2024) Wide receivers coach & pass game coordinator; Kentucky (2025) Wide receivers coach; Ole Miss (2026–present) Wide receivers coach

Operations
- Missouri (2020) Director of player development
- Stats at Pro Football Reference
- Stats at CFL.ca

L'Damian Washington (born May 10, 1991) is an American football coach and former wide receiver. He was a member of the Dallas Cowboys, San Francisco 49ers, New York Giants, Cleveland Browns, Miami Dolphins, Pittsburgh Steelers, Kansas City Chiefs, Edmonton Eskimos, Winnipeg Blue Bombers, Birmingham Iron, and St. Louis BattleHawks. He played college football at Missouri. Washington currently serves as the wide receivers coach for the Ole Miss Rebels.

== Early life ==
Washington attended Green Oaks High School, where he played football and basketball. As a junior, he earned All-district honors after making 7 interceptions while playing at cornerback.

As a senior, he registered 53 receptions for 1,064 yards and 12 touchdowns at wide receiver, while having 4 interceptions on defense. In one game he posted 6 receptions for 257 yards and 3 touchdowns. He was a team captain and a First-team All-district selection. He was named the offensive MVP at the inaugural Sportsman's Paradise All-Star Game in Louisiana.

== College career ==
Washington accepted a football scholarship from the University of Missouri. As a redshirt freshman, he appeared in 12 games (one start), collecting 5 receptions for 35 yards.

The next year, he recorded 20 receptions for 364 yards (18.2-yard average) and 3 touchdowns. He earned the full-time starter job as a junior, registering 25 receptions for 443 yards (17.7-yard average) and 2 touchdowns.

In 2013, Washington finished his senior season with 50 receptions for 893 yards (17.9-yard average) and 10 touchdowns, including a 96-yard touchdown catch against the University of South Carolina. He was limited with a left turf toe during the final five games of the season. He was also voted a team captain the same year.

== Professional career ==
Pre-draft measurables
Height	Weight	Arm length	Hand span	40-yard dash	20-yard shuttle	Three-cone drill	Vertical jump	Broad jump
6 ft 3 7/8 in (1.93 m)	195 lb (88 kg)	33 3/8 in (0.85 m)	9 in (0.23 m)	4.46 s	4.35 s	7.19 s	32.0 in (0.81 m)	9 ft 7 in (2.92 m)
All values from NFL Combine

=== Dallas Cowboys ===
Washington was signed as an undrafted free agent by the Dallas Cowboys after the 2014 NFL draft. He suffered a right shoulder injury in June, that forced him to miss most of the organized team activities. He returned in time for the start of training camp, but injuries on the defensive line forced the team to waive him on August 2.

=== San Francisco 49ers ===
Washington was claimed off waivers by the San Francisco 49ers on August 3, 2014. He was cut on August 30.

=== New York Giants ===
Washington was signed to the New York Giants practice squad on September 16, 2014. He was released on September 24.

=== Cleveland Browns ===
Washington was signed to the Cleveland Browns practice squad on October 21, 2014. He was waived on November 25.

=== Miami Dolphins ===
Washington was signed to the Miami Dolphins practice squad on December 3, 2014.

=== Pittsburgh Steelers ===
The Pittsburgh Steelers signed Washington to a futures contract on January 8, 2015. On May 21, he was placed on the injured reserve list and was waived injured 5 days later, after splitting his calf in two and tearing it off the bone.

=== Kansas City Chiefs ===
Washington signed with the Kansas City Chiefs on August 3, 2015. He was released by the team on August 30.

=== Edmonton Eskimos ===
On September 1, 2016, Washington was signed by the Edmonton Eskimos of the Canadian Football League. He was released from the practice roster on September 13.

=== Winnipeg Blue Bombers ===
On May 31, 2017, he signed with the Winnipeg Blue Bombers of the Canadian Football League. He started in the season opener against the Saskatchewan Roughriders, tallying 2 receptions for 38 yards and one touchdown. He appeared in 8 games, registering 24 receptions for 246 yards and two touchdown. He was cut on May 1, 2018.

=== Birmingham Iron ===
On September 14, 2018, Washington signed with the Birmingham Iron of the Alliance of American Football for the 2019 season. The league ceased operations in April 2019.

=== St. Louis BattleHawks ===
In October 2019, Washington was selected by the St. Louis BattleHawks as part of the 2020 XFL draft. On February 9, 2020, he started in the season opener tallying 5 receptions for 20 yards in a 15–9 win over the Dallas Renegades. In March, amid the COVID-19 pandemic, the league announced that it would be cancelling the rest of the season. Playing in all 5 games, he had 21 receptions for 252 yards and one touchdown. He had his contract terminated when the league suspended operations on April 10, 2020.

== Post-playing career ==
Washington was head football coach at West Middle School in Columbia, Missouri for the Fall 2019 and 2020 season.

In January 2022, Washington joined the Oklahoma Sooners football staff as an offensive analyst and assistant wide receivers coach. On August 7, 2022, following the sudden resignation of wide receivers coach Cale Gundy, Washington was appointed to the role on an interim basis by head coach Brent Venables.

Following the season, Washington joined the Western Kentucky Hilltoppers football coaching staff, but later that same offseason was offered and accepted the role of wide receivers coach at the University of South Florida. Initial results have been high, with FCS transfer Naiem Simmons posting 8 catches for 272 yards and a touchdown vs Rice University and returning WR Sean Atkins catching 4 passes for 116 yards and 2 TDs against the United States Naval Academy.

== Personal life ==
Washington is a motivational speaker. He graduated from the University of Missouri with a psychology degree in 4 years, despite having lost both of his parents at an early age. His father was murdered when he was only 6, and his mother had a stroke and died after one of his high school basketball games when he was only 15.

Washington is one of four brothers (La'Courtney, Tobias, Tomarious), once their mom had passed they had all decided to remain together as one taking care of each other, with La'Courtney becoming their legal guardian. Washington was accompanied by his best friends and also high school teammates; Joshua, Roovelroe and Jordan. L'Damian's best friend was murdered when he was only 15.
