= Beniquez Brown =

American football player (born 1993)

No. 42, 55
- Position: Linebacker

Personal information
- Born: April 29, 1993 (age 33); Florence, Alabama, U.S.
- Listed height: 6 ft 1 in (1.85 m)
- Listed weight: 238 lb (108 kg)

Career information
- High school: Florence (AL)
- College: Mississippi State
- NFL draft: 2016: undrafted

Career history
- Green Bay Packers (2016)*; Birmingham Iron (2019); Houston Roughnecks (2020); Houston Gamblers (2022)
- * Offseason or practice squad member only
- Stats at Pro Football Reference

Beniquez Jacoi Brown (born April 29, 1993) is an American former professional football linebacker. He played college football at Mississippi State. He was signed by the Green Bay Packers as an undrafted free agent in 2016, and later played for the Birmingham Iron of the Alliance of American Football and the Houston Roughnecks of the XFL.

== College career ==
Brown attended Mississippi State University, where he played for coach Dan Mullen's Mississippi State Bulldogs football team from 2012 to 2015.

=== Statistics ===
Source: HailState.com

Year	Team	G	GS	Tackles					Interceptions						Fumbles	
Year	Team	G	GS	Total	Solo	Ast	Sck	SFTY	PDef	Int	Yds	Avg	Lng	TDs	FF	FR
2013	MSST	13	3	39	16	23	0.0	0	0	0	0	0.0	0	0	0	2
2014	MSST	13	12	62	30	32	2.0	0	2	2	24	12.0	24	0	0	0
2015	MSST	13	13	99	48	51	4.0	0	2	1	2	2.0	2	0	0	0
Total		39	28	200	94	106	6.0	0	4	3	26	8.7	24	0	0	2

== Professional career ==
External videos
- Brown's NFL Combine workout

Pre-draft measurables
Height	Weight	Arm length	Hand span	40-yard dash	10-yard split	20-yard split	20-yard shuttle	Three-cone drill	Vertical jump	Broad jump	Bench press	Wonderlic
6 ft 1 in (1.85 m)	229 lb (104 kg)	31 3/8	9 1/8	4.77 s	1.64 s	2.79 s	4.28 s	7.07 s	31 in (0.79 m)	9 ft 2 in (2.79 m)	18 reps	17
All values are from NFL Combine

After going undrafted in the 2016 NFL draft, Brown signed with the Green Bay Packers on May 6, 2016. On September 3, 2016, he was released by the Packers during final team cuts. Brown was signed to the Packers' practice squad on September 5, 2016. He was released from the practice squad two days later.

In 2018, Brown signed with the Birmingham Iron of the AAF for the 2019 season. The league ceased operations in April 2019.

On October 15, 2019, Brown was drafted in the 6th round during phase three in the 2020 XFL Draft by the Houston Roughnecks. He had his contract terminated when the league suspended operations on April 10, 2020.

On February 23, 2022 he was selected by the Houston Gamblers in round 21 of the USFL draft.
