= Birmingham Iron =

Defunct professional American football team based in Birmingham, AL

Logo

General information
- Founded: 2018
- Folded: 2019
- Colors: Black, silver & white

Personnel
- Head coach: Tim Lewis
- President: Trey Brown

Team history
- Birmingham Iron (2019)

Home fields
- Legion Field (2019)

League / conference affiliations
- Alliance of American Football: Eastern Conference (2019)

The Birmingham Iron was a professional American football franchise based in Birmingham, Alabama, and one of the eight members of the Alliance of American Football (AAF), which played eight regular season games from February 2019 to April 2019. They played their home games at Legion Field. The Iron were coached by former National Football League player and coach Tim Lewis. Trey Brown was the executive vice president of football operations and Joe Pendry was the general manager.

On April 2, 2019, the league's football operations were reportedly suspended, and on April 4 the league allowed players to leave their contracts to sign with NFL teams. The league filed for Chapter 7 bankruptcy on April 17, 2019.

== History ==
The team was announced as a charter team of the Alliance of American Football on June 4, 2018. The team's first head coach was announced on June 6 as Tim Lewis, his first job at the position. On September 20, the league announced four eastern inaugural franchises' names and logos, including Birmingham as the Birmingham Iron. The name is a tribute to the city's iron industry, while the team colors of black, dark grey, and light grey were based on iron ore, coal, and flux, the components used to make steel.

The final 52-man roster was set on January 30, 2019. The team's first game was at home against the Memphis Express on February 10, 2019, when the Iron registered their first win and the first shutout in league history.

On March 31, the Iron clinched a playoff berth with a win against Atlanta, though the playoffs were never played as the league suspended football operations on April 2. The Iron finished at a 5–3 record.

== Final roster ==
2019 Birmingham Iron final roster
Quarterbacks: 4 Marcus McDade; 12 Luis Perez; 8 Keith Price; Running backs: 24 Marshaun Coprich; 32 Ty Isaac; 33 Trent Richardson; 45 Brandon Ross; Wide receivers: 14 Amba Etta-Tawo; 13 DeVozea Felton; 10 Tobais Palmer; 11 Quinton Patton; 18 Jamal Robinson; 17 L'Damian Washington; Tight ends: 80 Braedon Bowman; 83 Wes Saxton; 85 Colin Thompson	Offensive linemen: 67 Michael Dunn T/G; 62 Larson Graham G/T; 60 Brandon Greene T; 70 J. C. Hassenauer C; 77 Dominick Jackson T; 78 Korren Kirven G; 72 Matt McCants T; 79 Kitt O'Brien G/C; 73 Avery Young G; Defensive linemen: 63 Jeremy Faulk DE/NT; 94 Rickey Hatley NT; 92 Johnny Maxey DE; 99 Jake Payne DE; 90 Casey Sayles DE	Linebackers: 58 Aaron Adeoye OLB; 55 Beniquez Brown ILB; 51 Xzavier Dickson OLB; 59 Kris Frost OLB; 57 Jonathan Massaquoi OLB; 56 Shaheed Salmon ILB; 52 Ike Spearman ILB; 53 Devin Taylor OLB; 54 Matthew Wells ILB; Defensive backs: 35 Elijah Campbell CB; 21 Chris Davis CB; 31 Trey Johnson CB; 44 Joe Powell SS/FS; 20 Max Redfield SS; 28 JaCorey Shepherd CB; 26 Jamar Summers CB; 29 Bradley Sylve CB; 25 Jack Tocho FS; 22 Ryan White FS; Special teams: 48 Cole Mazza LS; 9 Nick Novak K; 2 Colton Schmidt P	Reserve lists: 81 Roy Anderson TE (IR); 88 Connor Davis TE (IR); -- Allen Edwards OLB (IR); 71 Joshua Frazier NT (IR); 27 Jacob Hagen SS (IR); 64 Sam Lee G (IR); 97 Lawrence Okoye DE (IR); 89 Johnathan Powell TE (IR); 23 Trovon Reed CB (IR); 6 Blake Sims QB (IR); Rights list: 15 Quan Bray WR; 37 Christian Bryant FS; 52 Active, 10 Inactive

=== Allocation pool ===
The team's assigned area, which designated player rights, included the following:

Colleges

- Alabama
- Alabama A&M
- Alabama State
- Auburn
- Indiana University of Pennsylvania
- Jacksonville State
- Louisiana Tech
- Maryland
- Miles College
- Mississippi State
- Missouri
- NC State
- North Alabama
- Ohio
- Samford
- South Alabama
- South Carolina
- Troy
- Tuskegee
- UAB
- West Alabama

National Football League (NFL)

- New England Patriots
- Buffalo Bills
- Cleveland Browns
- Pittsburgh Steelers

Canadian Football League (CFL)

- Montreal Alouettes
- Ottawa Redblacks

== Staff ==
Birmingham Iron staff
Front office: EVP of Football Operations – Trey Brown; General manager – Joe Pendry; Head coaches: Head coach – Tim Lewis; Offensive coaches: Offensive coordinator/Quarterbacks – Steve Logan; Running backs – Gerald Brown; Wide Receivers – Alex Mortensen; Offensive line – Dave Magazu	Defensive coaches: Defensive Coordinator – Rick Minter; Linebackers coach – Ted Cottrell; Defensive line – Ray Hamilton; Assistant Defensive Line - Lori Locust; Defensive assistant/Quality control – Steve Meyer; Special teams coaches: Special teams coordinator/Tight ends – Ray Rychleski; Assistant special teams/Secondary – Martin Bayless

== 2019 season ==
2019 Birmingham Iron season
- Head coach: Tim Lewis
- Home stadium: Legion Field

Results
- Record: 5–3
- League place: 2nd, Eastern Conference

=== Final standings ===
2019 Alliance of American Football standings
Eastern Conference
Club	W–L	PCT	CONF	PF	PA	DIFF	SOS	SOV	STK
(x) – Orlando Apollos	7–1	.875	5–0	236	136	100	.406	.375	W2
(x) – Birmingham Iron	5–3	.625	3–2	165	133	32	.406	.300	W1
(e) – Memphis Express	2–6	.250	1–4	152	194	-42	.578	.500	L1
(e) – Atlanta Legends	2–6	.250	1–4	88	213	-125	.609	.438	L3
Western Conference
Club	W–L	PCT	CONF	PF	PA	DIFF	SOS	SOV	STK
San Antonio Commanders	5–3	.625	3–2	158	154	4	.516	.450	L1
Arizona Hotshots	5–3	.625	3–2	186	144	42	.469	.500	W3
San Diego Fleet	3–5	.375	2–3	158	161	-3	.469	.417	L3
Salt Lake Stallions	3–5	.375	2–3	135	143	-8	.547	.417	W1
(x)–clinched playoff berth; (e)–eliminated from playoff contention

=== Schedule ===
==== Preseason ====
Week	Date	Opponent	Result	Record	Venue
–	January 28	vs. Arizona Hotshots	L 17–37	0–1	Alamodome

==== Regular season ====
Week	Date	Opponent	Result	Record	Venue
1	February 10	Memphis Express	W 26–0	1–0	Legion Field
2	February 16	Salt Lake Stallions	W 12–9	2–0	Legion Field
3	February 24	at Atlanta Legends	W 28–12	3–0	Georgia State Stadium
4	March 3	San Antonio Commanders	L 11–12	3–1	Legion Field
5	March 9	Orlando Apollos	L 14–31	3–2	Legion Field
6	March 17	at San Diego Fleet	W 32–29	4–2	SDCCU Stadium
7	March 24	at Memphis Express	L 25–31 (OT)	4–3	Liberty Bowl Memorial Stadium
8	March 31	Atlanta Legends	W 17–9	5–3	Legion Field
9	April 7	at Arizona Hotshots	Not played		Sun Devil Stadium
10	April 14	at Orlando Apollos	Not played		Spectrum Stadium

† Changed from original time and/or network

==== Postseason ====
Round	Date	Opponent	Result	Record	Venue
Semi	April 21	at Orlando Apollos	Not played		Spectrum Stadium

=== Game summaries ===
==== Week 1: Memphis ====
Week One: Memphis Express at Birmingham Iron – Game summary

Quarter	1	2	3	4	Total
Express	0	0	0	0	0
Iron	3	6	0	17	26

at Legion Field, Birmingham, Alabama

- Date: February 10
- Game time: 3:00 p.m. CT
- Game attendance: 17,039
- Referee: Brandon Cruse
- TV announcers (CBS Sports Network): Ben Holden, Adam Archuleta, and John Schriffen
- NoExtraPoints AAF

Game information

First Quarter

- (9:44) BIRM – Nick Novak 29-yard field goal, Iron 3–0

Second Quarter

- (10:36) BIRM – Nick Novak 28-yard field goal, Iron 6–0
- (3:21) BIRM – Nick Novak 47-yard field goal, Iron 9–0

Third Quarter
No scoring plays
Fourth Quarter

- (13:26) BIRM – Trent Richardson 4-yard rush (Luis Perez pass to Trent Richardson), Iron 17–0
- (4:17) BIRM – Nick Novak 32 yard field goal, Iron 20–0
- (1:55) BIRM – Trent Richardson 5-yard rush (rush failed), Iron 26–0

Top Passers

- MEM – Christian Hackenberg – 10/23, 87 yards, 1 INT
- BIRM – Luis Perez – 19/33, 252 yards

Top Rushers

- MEM – Zac Stacy – 12 carries, 58 yards
- BIRM – Trent Richardson – 23 carries, 58 yards, 2 TD

Top Receivers

- MEM – Alton Howard – 4 receptions, 33 yards
- BIRM – Quinton Patton – 4 receptions, 107 yards

The Iron began their season at home against the Express. In the first quarter, the Iron scored when Nick Novak kicked a 29-yard field goal to make it 3–0. They would increase their lead in the second quarter when Novak kicked 28-yard and 47-yard field goals to make it 6–0 and then 9–0 at halftime. After a scoreless third quarter, the Iron managed to pull away from the Express after Trent Richardson ran for a 4-yard touchdown to make it 17–0. This would be followed by Novak's fourth field goal attempt of the day in which he kicked a 32-yarder to make it 20–0. Finally, Richardson ran for his second touchdown of the game from 5 yards out (with a failed 2-point conversion) to make the final score 26–0.

With the win (their first as a franchise), the Iron started their season 1–0.

==== Week 2: Salt Lake ====
Week Two: Salt Lake Stallions at Birmingham Iron – Game summary

Quarter	1	2	3	4	Total
Stallions	0	9	0	0	9
Iron	0	0	6	6	12

at Legion Field, Birmingham, Alabama

- Date: February 16
- Game time: 1:00 p.m. CT
- Game attendance: 17,319
- Referee: Tra Blake
- TV announcers (TNT): Brian Anderson, Marvin Lewis, and Maurice Jones-Drew
- NoExtraPoints AAF

Game information

First Quarter
No scoring plays
Second Quarter

- (1:56) SL – Joel Bouagnon 3-yard rush (rush failed), Stallions 6–0
- (0:32) SL – Taylor Bertolet 53-yard field goal, Stallions 9–0

Third Quarter

- (2:23) BIRM – De'Mornay Pierson-El (SL) fumble recovered by Shaheed Salmon in the end zone for touchdown (rush failed), Stallions 9–6

Fourth Quarter

- (4:40) BIRM – Trent Richardson 3-yard rush (pass failed), Iron 12–9

Top Passers

- SL – Austin Allen – 15/31, 114 yards
- BIRM – Luis Perez – 24/38, 184 yards

Top Rushers

- SL – Joel Bouagnon – 11 carries, 70 yards, 1 TD
- BIRM – Trent Richardson – 19 carries, 41 yards, 1 TD

Top Receivers

- SL – De'Mornay Pierson-El – 4 receptions, 28 yards
- BIRM – Trent Richardson – 6 receptions, 50 yards

After a huge shut out win, the Iron stayed home for Week 2 against the Stallions. It was all Stallions in the first half after both teams failed to score in the first quarter. In the second quarter, the Stallions made it 6–0 when Joel Bouagnon ran for a 3-yard touchdown (with a failed 2-point conversion). They made it 9–0 at halftime when Taylor Bertolet kicked a 53-yard field goal. The Iron managed to get on the board in the third quarter when Shaheed Salmon recovered a fumble in the end zone for a touchdown (with a failed 2-point conversion) to make it 9–6. In the fourth quarter, the Iron were able to make the comeback as Trent Richardson ran for 3-yard touchdown to make the final score 12–9.

With the win, the Iron improved to 2–0.

==== Week 3: at Atlanta ====
Week Three: Birmingham Iron at Atlanta Legends – Game summary

Quarter	1	2	3	4	Total
Iron	0	9	11	8	28
Legends	0	6	0	6	12

at Georgia State Stadium, Atlanta, Georgia

- Date: February 24
- Game time: 3:00 p.m. CT
- Game attendance: 10,717
- Referee: Reggie Smith
- TV announcers (CBS Sports Network): Ben Holden, Adam Archuleta, and John Schriffen
- NoExtraPoints AAF

Game information

First Quarter
No scoring plays
Second Quarter

- (14:08) ATL – Younghoe Koo 21-yard field goal, Legends 3–0
- (10:26) BIRM – Nick Novak 39-yard field goal, Tied 3–3
- (2:36) BIRM – Trent Richardson 5-yard rush (pass failed), Iron 9–3
- (1:06) ATL – Younghoe Koo 35-yard field goal, Iron 9–6

Third Quarter

- (8:20) BIRM – Nick Novak 27-yard field goal, Iron 12–6
- (0:05) BIRM – Luis Perez 2-yard pass to Trent Richardson (Luis Perez pass to Trent Richardson), Iron 20–6

Fourth Quarter

- (4:28) BIRM – Trent Richardson 6-yard rush (Luis Perez pass to L'Damian Washington), Iron 28–6
- (1:41) ATL – Matt Simms 23-yard pass to Montay Crockett (pass failed), Iron 28–12

Top Passers

- BIRM – Luis Perez – 17/31, 160 yards, 1 INT
- ATL – Matt Simms – 28/48, 328 yards, 1 TD, 3 INT

Top Rushers

- BIRM – Trent Richardson – 17 carries, 46 yards, 3 TD
- ATL – Matt Simms – 2 carries, 27 yards

Top Receivers

- BIRM – Quinton Patton – 4 receptions, 58 yards
- ATL – Seantavius Jones – 4 receptions, 72 yards

After the tough home win, the Iron went on the road to face the Legends. After a scoreless first quarter, the Legends scored first when Younghoe Koo kicked a 21-yard field goal to make it 3–0. The Iron tied it up when Nick Novak kicked a 39-yard field goal to make it 3–3. They moved into the lead when Trent Richardson ran for a 5-yard touchdown (with a failed 2-point conversion) to make it 9–3. The Legends however drew closer when Koo kicked a 35-yard field goal to make it 9–6 at halftime. After the break, the Iron moved back ahead by 6 when Novak kicked a 27-yard field goal to make it 12–6. They would move ahead by double digits when Richardson ran for a 1-yard touchdown to make it 20–6. In the fourth quarter, the Iron pulled further away when Richardson ran for yet another touchdown to make it 28–6. The Legends wrapped up the scoring of the game when Matt Sims found Montay Crockett on a 23-yard pass (with a failed 2-point conversion) to make the final score 28–12.

With the win, the Iron improved to 3–0.

==== Week 4: San Antonio ====
Week Four: San Antonio Commanders at Birmingham Iron – Game summary

Quarter	1	2	3	4	Total
Commanders	3	0	6	3	12
Iron	0	3	0	8	11

at Legion Field, Birmingham, Alabama

- Date: March 3
- Game time: 3:00 p.m. CT
- Game attendance: 6,539
- Referee: John O'Neill
- TV announcers (CBS Sports Network): Ben Holden, Adam Archuleta, John Schriffen
- NoExtraPoints AAF

Game information

First Quarter

- (2:18) SA – Nick Rose 39-yard field goal, Commanders 3–0

Second Quarter

- (0:26) BIRM – Nick Novak 33-yard field goal, Tied 3–3

Third Quarter

- (1:46) SA – Trey Williams 12-yard rush (pass failed), Commanders 9–3

Fourth Quarter

- (3:58) SA – Nick Rose 20-yard field goal, Commanders 12–3
- (1:41) BIRM – Trent Richardson 1-yard rush (Luis Perez pass to DeVozea Felton), Commanders 12–11

Top Passers

- SA – Logan Woodside – 11/25, 44 yards
- BIRM – Luis Perez – 19/39, 202 yards, 2 INT

Top Rushers

- SA – Kenneth Farrow – 30 carries, 142 yards
- BIRM – Brandon Ross – 9 carries, 64 yards

Top Receivers

- SA – Greg Ward – 2 receptions, 24 yards
- BIRM – Wes Saxton – 3 receptions, 54 yards

After a tough road win, the Iron returned home for a game against the Commanders. In the first quarter, the Commanders scored first when Nick Rose kicked a 39-yard field goal to make it 3–0 for the only score. The Iron tied it up in the second quarter when Nick Novak kicked a 33-yard field goal to make it 3–3 at halftime. The Commanders got back into the lead in the third quarter when Trey Williams ran for a 12-yard touchdown (with a failed 2-point conversion) to make it 9–3. They increased their lead in the fourth quarter when Rose kicked a 20-yard field goal to make it 12–3. Later on in the quarter, the Iron came within a point when Trent Richardson ran for a 1-yard touchdown to make it 12–11. The Iron were able to get the ball back and try to convert a 4th-and-12 but Luis Perez was intercepted ending the game sending the Iron to their first ever loss.

With the loss, the Iron fell to 3–1 and second place in the Eastern Conference.

==== Week 5: Orlando ====
Week Five: Orlando Apollos at Birmingham Iron – Game summary

Quarter	1	2	3	4	Total
Apollos	14	6	3	8	31
Iron	0	8	6	0	14

at Legion Field, Birmingham, Alabama

- Date: March 9
- Game time: 1:00 p.m. CT
- Game attendance: 13,310
- Referee: James Carter
- TV announcers (TNT): Mark Malone, Shaun O'Hara
- NoExtraPoints AAF

Game information

- (12:26) ORL – Garrett Gilbert 21-yard pass to Scott Orndoff (pass failed), Apollos 6–0
- (0:44) ORL – Keith Reaser 40-yard interception return (Garrett Gilbert pass to Charles Johnson), Apollos 14–0

Second Quarter

- (3:29) ORL – Elliott Fry 21-yard field goal, Apollos 17–0
- (1:32) BIRM – Trent Richardson 3-yard rush (Keith Price pass to Quinton Patton), Apollos 17–8
- (0:00) ORL – Elliott Fry 22-yard field goal, Apollos 20–8

Third Quarter

- (4:27) BIRM – Keith Price 30-yard pass to Brandon Ross (pass failed), Apollos 20–14
- (0:10) ORL – Elliott Fry 27-yard field goal, Apollos 23–14

Fourth Quarter

- (8:33) ORL – Garrett Gilbert 12-yard pass to Charles Johnson (Garrett Gilbert pass to Jalin Marshall), Apollos 31–14

Top Passers

- ORL – Garrett Gilbert – 23/35, 286 yards, 2 TD
- BIRM – Keith Price – 19/30, 235 yards, 1 TD

Top Rushers

- ORL – De'Veon Smith – 14 carries, 119 yards
- BIRM – Trent Richardson – 8 carries, 21 yards, 1 TD

Top Receivers

- ORL – Charles Johnson – 6 receptions, 83 yards, 1 TD
- BIRM – Wes Saxton – 3 receptions, 75 yards

After a tough home loss, the Iron stayed home to face the undefeated Apollos. In the first quarter, the Apollos scored first when Garrett Gilbert found Scott Orndorff on a 21-yard pass (with a failed 2-point conversion) to make it 6–0. This would be followed by Keith Reaser returning an interception 40 yards to make it 14–0. In the second quarter, Elliott Fry kicked a 21-yard field goal to make it 17–0. The Iron finally got on the board when Trent Richardson ran for a 3-yard touchdown to make it 17–8. Though, the Apollos pulled away at halftime when Fry kicked a 22-yard field goal to make it 20–8. In the third quarter, the Iron drew closer when Keith Price found Brandon Ross on a 30-yard touchdown (with a failed 2-point conversion) to make it 20–14. Though, the Apollos made it 23–14 by way of Fry's 27-yard field goal. In the fourth quarter, the Apollos wrapped up the scoring of the game when Gilbert found Jalin Marshall on a 12-yard pass to make the final score 31–14.

With their second straight loss, the Iron fell to 3–2.

==== Week 6: at San Diego ====
Week Six: Birmingham Iron at San Diego Fleet – Game summary

Quarter	1	2	3	4	Total
Iron	6	9	6	11	32
Fleet	3	6	14	6	29

at SDCCU Stadium, San Diego, California

- Date: March 17
- Game time: 7:00 p.m. CT
- Game attendance: 20,986
- Referee: John O'Neill
- TV announcers (CBS Sports Network): Ben Holden, Adam Archuleta and John Schriffen
- NoExtraPoints AAF

Game information

First Quarter

- (6:54) SD – Donny Hageman 36-yard field goal, Fleet 3–0
- (0:27) BIRM – Luis Perez 13-yard pass to Trent Richardson (pass failed), Iron 6–3

Second Quarter

- (8:43) BIRM – Luis Perez 83-yard pass to L'Damian Washington (rush failed), Iron 12–3
- (7:27) SD – Mike Bercovici 1-yard pass to Ben Johnson (pass failed), Iron 12–9
- (0:15) BIRM – Nick Novak 23-yard field goal, Iron 15–9

Third Quarter

- (10:38) BIRM – Trent Richardson 2-yard rush (pass failed), Iron 21–9
- (8:56) SD – Terrell Watson 2-yard rush (Mike Bercovici pass to Brian Brown), Iron 21–17
- (4:57) SD – Mike Bercovici 12-yard pass to Terrell Watson (rush failed), Fleet 23–21

Fourth Quarter

- (14:10) BIRM – Luis Perez 23-yard pass to L'Damian Washington (Luis Perez pass to L'Damian Washington), Iron 29–23
- (4:32) SD – Mike Bercovici 13-yard pass to Francis Owusu (pass failed), Tied 29–29
- (0:00) BIRM – Nick Novak 44-yard field goal, Iron 32–29

Top Passers

- BIRM – Luis Perez – 27/49, 359 yards, 3 TD, 2 INT
- SD – Mike Bercovici – 17/34, 311 yards, 3 TD, 2 INT

Top Rushers

- BIRM – Trent Richardson – 16 carries, 46 yards, 1 TD
- SD – Terrell Watson – 8 carries, 38 yards, 1 TD

Top Receivers

- BIRM – L'Damian Washington – 4 receptions, 83 yards, 2 TD
- SD – Dontez Ford – 3 receptions, 72 yards

After yet another tough loss at home, the Iron traveled west to take on the Fleet. In the first quarter, the Fleet scored first when Donny Hageman kicked a 36-yard field goal to make it 3–0. The Iron took the lead later on in the quarter when Luis Perez found Trent Richardson on a 13-yard pass (with a failed 2-point conversion) to make it 6–3. In the second quarter, the Iron increased their lead when Perez found L'Damian Washington on an 83-yard pass (with another failed 2-point conversion) to make it 12–3. The Fleet drew closer when Mike Bercovici found Ben Johnson on a 1-yard pass (with a failed 2-point conversion) to make it 12–9. Nick Novak came out to kick a 23-yard field goal to help the Iron to a 15–9 lead at halftime. In the third quarter, the Iron went back ahead by double-digits as Richardson ran for a 2-yard touchdown (with yet another failed 2-point conversion) to make it 21–9. However, the Fleet would score two straight times to retake the lead: Terrell Watson would run for a 2-yard touchdown to make it 21–17, followed up by Bercovici finding Watson on a 12-yard pass (with a failed 2-point conversion) to make it 23–21. In the fourth quarter, however, the Iron took the lead back when Perez found Washington again, this time on a 23-yard pass to make it 29–21. Then, the Fleet would tie it up at 29–29, after Bercovici found Francis Owusu on a 13-yard pass. The Iron completed the comeback with no time left in the game as Novak kicked the game-winning 44-yard field goal to make the final score 32–29.

With the win, the Iron improved to 4–2.

==== Week 7: at Memphis ====
Week Seven: Birmingham Iron at Memphis Express – Game summary

Quarter	1	2	3	4	OT	Total
Iron	8	8	3	6	0	25
Express	0	8	6	11	6	31

at Liberty Bowl Memorial Stadium, Memphis, Tennessee

- Date: March 24
- Game time: 7:00 p.m. CT
- Game weather: Cloudy • Temperature: 71 °F (22 °C) • Wind: 13 mph
- Game attendance: 13,758
- Referee: Tra Blake
- TV announcers (NFL Network): Matt "Money" Smith, Marvin Lewis
- NoExtraPoints AAF

Game information

First Quarter

- (6:18) BIRM – Luis Perez 11-yard pass to Braedon Bowman (Trent Richardson rush), Iron 8–0

Second Quarter

- (14:56) MEM – Terrence Magee 1-yard rush (Brandon Silvers pass to Dan Williams), Tied 8–8
- (13:44) BIRM – Trent Richardson 1-yard rush (Trent Richardson rush), Iron 16–8

Third Quarter

- (9:04) BIRM – Nick Novak 28-yard field goal, Iron 19–8
- (3:54) MEM – Blocked punt returned 50 yards for touchdown by Terrell Bonds (pass failed), Iron 19–14

Fourth Quarter

- (9:01) BIRM – Luis Perez 4-yard pass to Wes Saxton (pass failed), Iron 25–14
- (4:16) MEM – Austin MacGinnis 22-yard field goal, Iron 25–17
- (0:24) MEM – Brandon Silvers 7-yard pass to Reece Horn (Brandon Silvers pass to Brandon Barnes), Tied 25–25

Overtime

- MEM – Brandon Silvers 10-yard pass to Dan Williams, Express 31–25

Top Passers

- BIRM – Luis Perez – 16/37, 235 yards, 2 TD
- MEM – Brandon Silvers – 24/35, 266 yards, 2 TD

Top Rushers

- BIRM – Trent Richardson – 16 carries, 56 yards, 1 TD
- MEM – Johnny Manziel – 2 carries, 20 yards

Top Receivers

- BIRM – Amba Etta-Tawo – 3 receptions, 71 yards
- MEM – Reece Horn – 7 receptions, 113 yards, 1 TD

After a tough road win, the Iron traveled again to take on the Express. In the first quarter, the Iron scored first when Luiz Perez found Braedon Bowman on an 11-yard pass to make it 8-0. In the second quarter, the Express tied it up when Terrence Magee ran for a 1-yard touchdown to make it 8-8. Trent Richardson then got the Iron ahead at halftime when he ran for a 1-yard touchdown to make it 16-8. In the third quarter, the Iron increased their lead when Nick Novak kicked a 28-yard field goal to make it 19-8. Though, the Express drew closer when Terrell Bonds blocked a punt and returned it 50 yards for a touchdown (with a failed 2-point conversion) to make it 19-14. In the fourth quarter, the Iron moved ahead by double digits again when Perez found Wes Saxton on a 4-yard pass (with a failed 2-point conversion) to make it 25-14. Though, the Express would score 2 straight times to tie the game up and force overtime when Austin MacGinnis kicked a 22-yard field goal to make it 25-17 and then Brandon Silvers found Reece Horn on a 7-yard pass to make it 25-25. In overtime, Silvers found Dan Williams on a 10-yard pass to make it 31-25 for the Express comeback win.

With the loss, the Iron fell to 4-3.

==== Week 8: Atlanta ====
Week Eight: Atlanta Legends at Birmingham Iron – Game summary

Quarter	1	2	3	4	Total
Legends	3	3	3	0	9
Iron	0	11	3	3	17

at Legion Field, Birmingham, Alabama

- Date: March 31
- Game time: 3:00 p.m. CT
- Game attendance: 17,328
- Referee: Jeff Heaser
- TV announcers (CBS Sports Network): Rich Waltz, Adam Archuleta and Melanie Collins
- NoExtraPoints AAF

Game information

First Quarter

- (1:39) ATL – Younghoe Koo 33-yard field goal, Legends 3–0

Second Quarter

- (14:51) BIRM – Nick Novak 35-yard field goal, Tied 3–3
- (8:13) BIRM – Trent Richardson 2-yard rush (Luis Perez pass to Quinton Patton), Iron 11–3
- (2:13) ATL – Younghoe Koo 31-yard field goal, Iron 11–6

Third Quarter

- (12:46) BIRM – Nick Novak 37-yard field goal, Iron 14–6
- (9:01) ATL – Younghoe Koo 35-yard field goal, Iron 14–9

Fourth Quarter

- (10:14) BIRM – Nick Novak 28-yard field goal, Iron 17–9

Top Passers

- ATL – Matt Simms – 13/22, 135 yards, 1 INT
- BIRM – Luis Perez – 10/24, 65 yards

Top Rushers

- ATL – Brandon Radcliff – 6 carries, 30 yards
- BIRM – Trent Richardson – 18 carries, 83 yards, 1 TD

Top Receivers

- ATL – Justin Thomas – 4 receptions, 74 yards
- BIRM – Wes Saxton – 3 receptions, 36 yards

After a tough loss, the Iron returned home for their final home game of the season against the Legends. Another distraction came when minority owner Mark Jennings announced he had sold his shares in the Iron just three days before the game. In the first quarter, the Legends scored first when Younghoe Koo kicked a 33-yard field goal to make it 3-0. In the second quarter, the Iron tied the game up when Nick Novak kicked a 35-yard field goal to make it 3-3. They would take the lead when Trent Richardson ran for a 2-yard touchdown to make it 11-3. Though the Legends drew closer when Koo kicked a 31-yard field goal to make it 11-6 at halftime. In the third quarter, the Iron pulled away when Novak kicked a 37-yard field goal to make it 14-6. Though, the Legends came within 5 again when Koo kicked a 35-yard field goal to make it 14-9. In the fourth quarter, the Iron moved back ahead and eventually won by 8 when Novak kicked a 28-yard field goal to make the final score 17-9.

With the win, the Iron were able to seal the second playoff spot and improve to 5-3.

== Media ==
In addition to league-wide television coverage through CBS, NFL Network, CBS Sports Network, TNT, and B/R Live, Birmingham's games were also broadcast on local radio by WERC (AM).
