= Jacory =

Jacory is a masculine given name. Notable people with the name include:

- Jacory Barney Jr., American football player
- Jacory Croskey-Merritt (born 2001), American football player
- Jacory Harris (born 1990), American football player
- Jacory Patterson (born 2000), American sprinter

== See also ==
- JaCorey
