= Ray Hamilton (defensive tackle) =

American football player and coach (born 1951)

No. 71
- Position: Defensive tackle

Personal information
- Born: January 20, 1951 (age 75); Omaha, Nebraska, U.S.
- Listed height: 6 ft 1 in (1.85 m)
- Listed weight: 244 lb (111 kg)

Career information
- High school: Douglass (Oklahoma City, Oklahoma)
- College: Oklahoma
- NFL draft: 1973: 14th round, 342nd overall pick

Career history

Playing
- New England Patriots (1973–1981)

Coaching
- New England Patriots (1985–1989) Assistant defensive line coach; Bay State Titans (1990) Head coach; Tampa Bay Buccaneers (1991) Defensive line coach; Tennessee (1992) Defensive line coach; Los Angeles Raiders (1993–1994) Defensive line coach; New York Jets (1995–1997) Defensive line coach; New England Patriots (1998–1999) Defensive line coach; New York Jets (2000) Defensive line coach; Cleveland Browns (2001–2002) Defensive line coach; Jacksonville Jaguars (2003–2007) Defensive line coach; Atlanta Falcons (2008–2013) Defensive line coach; Birmingham Iron (2019) Defensive line coach

Awards and highlights
- New England Patriots All-1970s Team; First-team All-Big Eight (1971)

Career NFL statistics
- Games played: 132
- Games started: 117
- Fumble recoveries: 14
- Stats at Pro Football Reference

Ray "Sugar Bear" Hamilton (born January 20, 1951) is an American former professional football player and coach. He played as a defensive tackle from 1973 through 1981 for the New England Patriots of the National Football League (NFL). He also coached for the Patriots as an assistant defensive line coach in Super Bowl XX. Hamilton got his first shot as a defensive line coach for the NFL's Atlanta Falcons. Hamilton was an All Big 8 defensive tackle playing college football for the Oklahoma Sooners, being named to the first team in 1971 and 1972.

Hamilton is best known for an incident in the 1976 NFL playoffs in a first-round game against the Oakland Raiders, when Oakland's Ken Stabler threw an incompletion after Hamilton tipped the ball as he threw. Stabler fell backwards after hit him, and the play would have resulted in a fourth down and 18 yards to go. Ben Dreith, the referee, gave the Raiders a first down on a penalty for roughing the passer. Hamilton later was a defensive line coach for nine NFL teams, including the Patriots and Raiders.

Before becoming the defensive line coach for the Falcons, he spent the previous five years in the same position with the Jacksonville Jaguars. Hamilton spent two seasons as the Defensive Line Coach for the Cleveland Browns from 2001 to 2002. In his first season with Cleveland, the Browns tied for fourth in the AFC with 43 sacks. For three seasons, Hamilton served as New England Defensive Line Coach from 1997 to 1999 and joined the New York Jets staff in 2000. His 1998 defensive line tallied 25 of the team 36 sacks, the seventh-best total in the NFL. In 1995, Hamilton joined the Jets in his first stint with the team as the Defensive Line Coach. He guided defensive end Hugh Douglas, who was named the 1995 NFL Defensive Rookie of the Year. From 1993 to 1994, Hamilton was a member of the Los Angeles Raiders where he developed Chester McGlockton and a defensive line that combined for 83 sacks in his two seasons with the Raiders. In 2006, Hamilton guided defensive end Bobby McCray who developed into one of the AFC top pass rushers as he led Jacksonville with a career-high 10 sacks. The defensive line combined for 29.5 sacks, ranking fourth in the NFL in rushing yards allowed per game.

In 2018, Hamilton became the defensive line coach for the Birmingham Iron of the Alliance of American Football.
