= Trey Brown =

American football player and executive (born 1985)

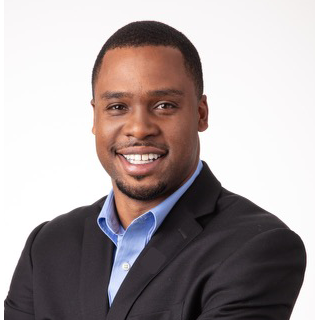

Cincinnati Bengals
- Title: Assistant general manager

Personal information
- Born: March 1, 1985 (age 41); Overland Park, Kansas, U.S.
- Listed height: 5 ft 8 in (1.73 m)
- Listed weight: 186 lb (84 kg)

Career information
- Position: Cornerback
- High school: Blue Valley Northwest (Overland Park)
- College: UCLA
- NFL draft: 2008: undrafted

Career history

Playing
- Chicago Bears (2008)*; New York Sentinels (2009)
- * Offseason or practice squad member only

Operations
- New England Patriots (2010) Scouting Assistant; New England Patriots (2011–2012) Area Scout; Philadelphia Eagles (2013–2014) Area Scout; Philadelphia Eagles (2015) Assistant Director of College Scouting; Philadelphia Eagles (2016–2018) Director of College Scouting; Birmingham Iron (2019) Executive Vice President of Football Operations; St. Louis BattleHawks (2020) Director of Player Personnel; Cincinnati Bengals (2021) Scout; Cincinnati Bengals (2022–2024) Senior Personnel Executive; Cincinnati Bengals (2025–present) Assistant General Manager

Awards and highlights
- Super Bowl champion (LII); Second-team All-American (2007)

Theotis "Trey" Brown III (born March 1, 1985) is an American professional football executive and former player who is an Assistant General Manager for the Cincinnati Bengals. He played professionally as a cornerback. He played college football for the UCLA Bruins, earning second-team All-American honors in 2007. Brown was hired by the Bengals in 2021.

== Career ==
=== Playing career ===
Pre-draft measurables
| Height | Weight | 40-yard dash | 10-yard split | 20-yard split | 20-yard shuttle | Three-cone drill | Vertical jump | Broad jump | Bench press |
|---|---|---|---|---|---|---|---|---|---|
| 5 ft 8 1/2 in (1.74 m) | 186 lb (84 kg) | 4.65 s | 1.65 s | 2.72 s | 4.29 s | 7.09 s | 37.0 in (0.94 m) | 9 ft 11 in (3.02 m) | 18 reps |
All values from Pro Day

As a player, he was signed by the Chicago Bears as an undrafted free agent in 2009. He played college football for the UCLA Bruins. He also played for the New York Sentinels.

=== NFL scout ===
Brown has spent 14 years in the National Football League as a scout/executive. From 2010 to 2012, he was a scout with the New England Patriots. Then, from 2013 to 2018, he was with the Philadelphia Eagles in a variety of capacities including the Director of College Scouting from 2016 to 2018. After a 2 year stint running organizations in other pro football leagues, Brown returned to the NFL with the Cincinnati Bengals in 2021 and has been with them ever since. Brown has made the Super Bowl with all three NFL teams he has worked for: as an Area Scout after the 2011 season with the New England Patriots, as the Director of College Scouting after the 2017 season with the Philadelphia Eagles (where they beat the Patriots 41–33), and as a Scout after the 2021 season with the Cincinnati Bengals.

Brown has interviewed for multiple General Manager jobs over the past 7 seasons. His first GM interview came with the Buffalo Bills after the draft in May 2017. Brown then proceeded to have 3 GM interviews with the Raiders over a 6 year period. In December of 2018, Brown interviewed with the Oakland Raiders, and in January of both 2022 and 2024 Brown interviewed for the Las Vegas Raiders GM job. After the 2024 season, Brown had 2 more GM interviews, one with the Jacksonville Jaguars and another with the New York Jets where he was a finalist for the job. He also turned down a request to interview for the New England Patriots top job in 2024.

On July 18, 2025, the Bengals promoted Brown to Assistant General Manager.

=== AAF and XFL ===
After his first two stops in the NFL, Brown spent the next two years building rosters (and entire organizations) from scratch in the AAF with the Birmingham Iron and XFL with the St. Louis BattleHawks as it afforded him the opportunity to "do things that you probably wouldn't get a chance to do or get experience in the NFL." In the AAF, he had already clinched a playoff spot with the Birmingham Iron when the league folded. In the XFL, the BattleHawks were tied for first place in their division when the league folded.

== Media ==
In 2016, Brown appeared in a Microsoft Surface Pro 4 TV commercial.
