= Elijah Campbell =

American football player (born 1995)

No. 28 – New York Giants
- Position: Safety
- Roster status: Active

Personal information
- Born: August 24, 1995 (age 31); Saint Paul, Minnesota, U.S.
- Listed height: 5 ft 11 in (1.80 m)
- Listed weight: 190 lb (86 kg)

Career information
- High school: Central (Saint Paul)
- College: Iowa Western CC (2014); Northern Illinois (2015); Northern Iowa (2016–2017)
- NFL draft: 2018: undrafted

Career history
- Cleveland Browns (2018)*; Birmingham Iron (2019); DC Defenders (2020); New York Jets (2020); Miami Dolphins (2021–2025); New York Giants (2026–present)
- * Offseason or practice squad member only

Awards and highlights
- Third-team FCS All-American (2017); First-team All-MVFC (2017); Second-team All-MVFC (2016)

Career NFL statistics as of 2025
- Total tackles: 45
- Pass deflections: 2
- Forced fumbles: 1
- Fumble recoveries: 1
- Stats at Pro Football Reference

Elijah Campbell (born August 24, 1995) is an American professional football safety and special teamer for the New York Giants of the National Football League (NFL). After playing college football for Iowa Western, Northern Illinois, and Northern Iowa, he signed with the Cleveland Browns as an undrafted free agent in 2018, then for the New York Jets and Miami Dolphins. He also played for the Birmingham Iron of the Alliance of American Football (AAF) and DC Defenders of the XFL.

== Early life ==
Campbell is the son of Jamal and Denna Hickman. He attended Saint Paul Central High School in Saint Paul, Minnesota. During his high school years, he lettered in football and track and field. He helped his team to an 8–1 record in 2012, rushing for 1,002 yards and 18 touchdowns. He racked up 69 tackles as a two-way athlete his senior season, adding six interceptions.

== College career ==
Campbell began his college career at the junior college role for the Iowa Western Community College football team. There, in 2014 he contributed to their undefeated season and played in the Junior College National Championship. He then transferred to play for the Northern Illinois Huskies football team in 2015. In his lone season at Northern Illinois, Campbell appeared in 13 games, mainly on special teams, recording five total tackles. After the season, he transferred again, this time to play for the Northern Iowa Panthers football team.

At Northern Iowa, Campbell won a starting safety role, starting 11 games in 2016, recording 42 tackles, three interceptions, six pass deflections, and two forced fumbles. He was named second-team All-MVFC for his performance.

As a senior in 2017, Campbell started 12 games at safety, recording 51 tackles, one sack, three forced fumbles, one fumble recovery, five interceptions, and 17 pass breakups. He was named first-team All-MVFC and third-team FCS All-American for his successful season.

== Professional career ==
Pre-draft measurables
Height	Weight	Arm length	Hand span	Wingspan	40-yard dash	10-yard split	20-yard split	20-yard shuttle	Three-cone drill	Vertical jump	Broad jump	Bench press
5 ft 11 in (1.80 m)	190 lb (86 kg)	30 1/8 in (0.77 m)	9 1/4 in (0.23 m)	6 ft 0 1/8 in (1.83 m)	4.40 s	1.64 s	2.62 s	4.06 s	7.08 s	39.0 in (0.99 m)	10 ft 5 in (3.18 m)	15 reps
All values from Pro Day

=== Cleveland Browns ===
Campbell signed with the Cleveland Browns as an undrafted free agent following the 2018 NFL draft on May 4, 2018. He was waived before the start of the regular season on August 31.

=== Birmingham Iron ===
Campbell signed with the Birmingham Iron of the Alliance of American Football (AAF) in November 2018. He made the roster out of training camp in February 2019, but after playing eight weeks of games, the league ceased operations the following April.

=== DC Defenders ===
Campbell was selected by the DC Defenders of the XFL with the fourth overall selection in the defensive backs phase of the 2020 XFL draft on October 16, 2019. He played in four games for the Defenders, and had his contract terminated when the league suspended operations on April 10, 2020.

=== New York Jets ===
Campbell signed with the New York Jets' practice squad on November 3, 2020. He was elevated to the active roster on December 5 for the team's Week 13 game against the Las Vegas Raiders, and reverted to the practice squad after the game. He was promoted to the active roster on December 8. Campbell was waived on August 31, 2021.

=== Miami Dolphins ===
Campbell was claimed off waivers by the Miami Dolphins on September 1, 2021. He was placed on injured reserve on November 27.

On March 8, 2022, Campbell re-signed with the Dolphins. He played in 16 games with one start at safety, mainly appearing on special teams. On March 7, 2023, the Dolphins tendered Campbell. He played in 15 games with one start at safety, again appearing mostly on special teams.

On March 8, 2024, Campbell was re-signed for his fourth season with the Dolphins. He played in all 17 games for Miami, including one start, posting 11 combined tackles and one forced fumble.

On May 12, 2025, Campbell re-signed with the Dolphins. In 10 appearances for Miami, he recorded five combined tackles. On December 20, Campbell was placed on season-ending injured reserve due to an ankle injury.

=== New York Giants ===
On March 20, 2026, Campbell signed with the New York Giants.

== Personal life ==
On June 26, 2021, Campbell married his girlfriend, Anisse in Ham Lake, Minnesota after getting engaged in July 2019. The couple had a child on April 21, 2018 named Zakai. The Campbells own and operate several Florida-area franchises of the açaí bowl chain restaurant Nautical Bowls.
