= Wes Saxton =

American football player (born 1993)

No. 86
- Position: Tight end

Personal information
- Born: August 13, 1993 (age 33); Birmingham, Alabama, U.S.
- Listed height: 6 ft 4 in (1.93 m)
- Listed weight: 240 lb (109 kg)

Career information
- High school: Hueytown (AL)
- College: Itawamba CC (2011); South Alabama (2012–2014)
- NFL draft: 2015: undrafted

Career history
- New York Jets (2015); Washington Redskins (2016–2017)*; Buffalo Bills (2017)*; Detroit Lions (2018)*; San Francisco 49ers (2018)*; Birmingham Iron (2019); Seattle Seahawks (2019)*; Washington Redskins (2019)*; Seattle Seahawks (2019)*; St. Louis BattleHawks (2020); New Jersey Generals (2022–2023); Memphis Showboats (2024)
- * Offseason or practice squad member only

Awards and highlights
- First-team All-Sun Belt (2013)
- Stats at Pro Football Reference

William Earl Saxton Jr. (born August 13, 1993) is an American former professional football tight end. He played college football at South Alabama. He was a member of the New York Jets, Washington Redskins, Buffalo Bills, Detroit Lions, San Francisco 49ers, and Seattle Seahawks of the National Football League (NFL); Birmingham Iron of the Alliance of American Football (AAF); St. Louis BattleHawks of the XFL; New Jersey Generals of the United States Football League (USFL); and Memphis Showboats of the United Football League (UFL).

== Early life ==
Saxton graduated from Hueytown High School in Alabama in 2011.

== College career ==
Saxton was selected to the Mississippi Association of Community and Junior Colleges all-state second-team while playing at Itawamba Community College. In his only season, Saxton had 10 receptions, 137 receiving yards one receiving touchdown. Saxton was selected to the all-Sun Belt Conference first-team and all-league first-team by Phil Steele Publications and College Sports Madness in his junior season at South Alabama.

== Professional career ==
=== New York Jets ===
On May 2, 2015, Saxton signed with the New York Jets following the conclusion of the 2015 NFL draft. On September 6, 2015, Saxton was signed to the practice squad a day after being released.

On October 12, 2015, Saxton was cut from the team. On October 14, Saxton was re-signed to the practice squad after clearing waivers.

On September 3, 2016, Saxton was released by the Jets as part of final roster cuts.

=== Washington Redskins (first stint) ===
The Washington Redskins signed Saxton to their practice squad on September 5, 2016. He signed a futures contract with the Redskins on January 2, 2017. He was waived by the Redskins on May 15, 2017.

=== Buffalo Bills ===
On May 24, 2017, Saxton signed with the Buffalo Bills. He was waived on September 2, 2017.

=== Detroit Lions ===
On June 4, 2018, Saxton signed with the Detroit Lions. He was waived on June 14, 2018.

=== San Francisco 49ers ===
On July 31, 2018, Saxton signed with the San Francisco 49ers. He was released on August 31, 2018.

=== Birmingham Iron ===
On November 9, 2018, Saxton signed with the Birmingham Iron of the Alliance of American Football (AAF) for the 2019 season. He was waived before the start of the regular season, but was re-signed on February 20, 2019.

=== Seattle Seahawks (first stint) ===
After the AAF folded in April 2019, he signed with the Seattle Seahawks on August 3, 2019. He was waived on August 31, 2019.

=== Washington Redskins (second stint) ===
On October 15, 2019, Saxton was signed to the Redskins practice squad. He was released on November 12.

=== Seattle Seahawks (second stint) ===
On November 26, 2019, Saxton was signed to the Seahawks practice squad. His practice squad contract with the team expired on January 20, 2020.

=== St. Louis BattleHawks ===
Saxton was selected by the St. Louis BattleHawks of the XFL in the fifth round (38th overall) of the skills phase of the 2020 XFL draft on October 15, 2019. He signed a contract with the team on January 26, 2020. He had his contract terminated when the league suspended operations on April 10, 2020.

=== New Jersey Generals ===
Saxton signed with the New Jersey Generals of the United States Football League (USFL) on April 19, 2022. He was transferred to the team's active roster on April 22.

Saxton re-signed with the team on July 11, 2023. The Generals folded when the XFL and USFL merged to create the United Football League (UFL).

=== Memphis Showboats ===
Saxton was selected by the Memphis Showboats during the 2024 UFL dispersal draft on January 5, 2024.

== Personal life ==
Saxton is the cousin of former NFL running back and former assistant coach Tony Nathan.
