= Xzavier Dickson =

American football player (born 1992)

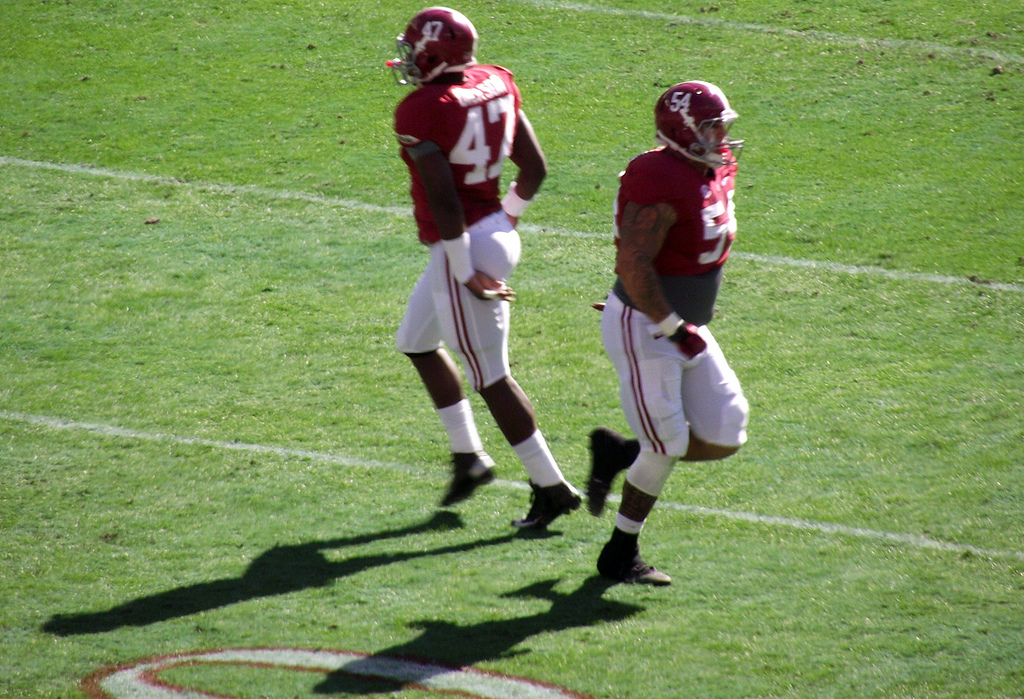
- Dickson (left) and Jesse Williams with Alabama in 2012

No. 42
- Position: Linebacker

Personal information
- Born: September 11, 1992 (age 34); Griffin, Georgia, U.S.
- Listed height: 6 ft 3 in (1.91 m)
- Listed weight: 268 lb (122 kg)

Career information
- High school: Griffin (GA)
- College: Alabama
- NFL draft: 2015: 7th round, 253rd overall pick

Career history
- New England Patriots (2015)*; Atlanta Falcons (2015)*; Edmonton Eskimos (2016)*; Toronto Argonauts (2018)*; Birmingham Iron (2019); Massachusetts Pirates (2020)
- * Offseason or practice squad member only

Awards and highlights
- BCS national champion (2012, 2013)
- Stats at Pro Football Reference

Xzavier Dickson (born September 11, 1992) is an American former professional football linebacker. He was selected by the New England Patriots in the seventh round of the 2015 NFL draft. He played college football at Alabama.

== College career ==
Throughout his college career from 2012 to 2014, he appeared in 39 games for Alabama. In his last season before entering the draft, he logged at least 0.5 sacks in five straight games and finished the season with 9.0 sacks, 42 tackles, and 12.5 tackles for loss.

== Professional career ==
=== New England Patriots ===
Dickson was selected with the 253rd overall pick in the seventh round of the 2015 NFL draft by the New England Patriots. He was released by the Patriots on September 5, 2015.

=== Atlanta Falcons ===
Dickson was signed to the practice squad of the Atlanta Falcons on December 30, 2015.

=== Toronto Argonauts ===
Dickson was signed by the Toronto Argonauts of the Canadian Football League on April 17, 2018. He was released on June 10, 2018.

=== Birmingham Iron ===
On November 19, 2018, Dickson was signed by the Birmingham Iron of the Alliance of American Football. In the season opener against the Memphis Express, Dickson intercepted an Express pass from quarterback Brandon Silvers. The league ceased operations in April 2019.
