= Trent Richardson =

American football player (born 1990)

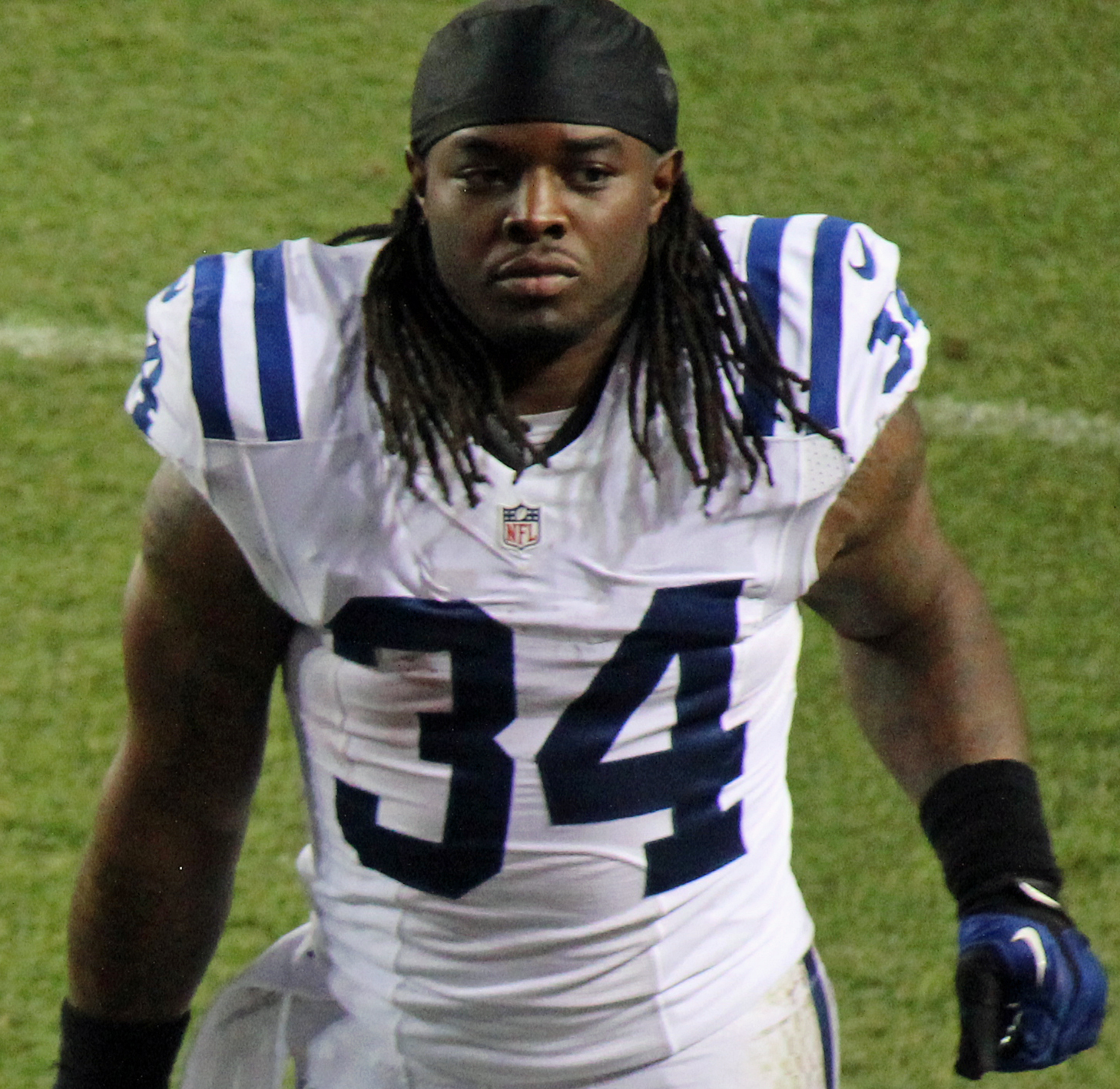
- Richardson with the Indianapolis Colts in 2014

No. 33, 34
- Position: Running back

Personal information
- Born: July 10, 1990 (age 36); Pensacola, Florida, U.S.
- Listed height: 5 ft 9 in (1.75 m)
- Listed weight: 230 lb (104 kg)

Career information
- High school: Escambia (Pensacola)
- College: Alabama (2009–2011)
- NFL draft: 2012: 1st round, 3rd overall pick

Career history

Playing
- Cleveland Browns (2012–2013); Indianapolis Colts (2013–2014); Oakland Raiders (2015)*; Baltimore Ravens (2016)*; Saskatchewan Roughriders (2017); Birmingham Iron (2019); Caudillos de Chihuahua (2022)
- * Offseason or practice squad member only

Coaching
- Ramsay HS (AL) (2024–2025) Running backs coach; John Carroll Catholic High School (Alabama) (2026-present)

Awards and highlights
- AAF rushing touchdowns leader (2019); 2× BCS national champion (2009, 2011); Doak Walker Award (2011); Unanimous All-American (2011); SEC Offensive Player of the Year (2011); 2× First-team All-SEC (2010, 2011); SEC All-Freshman Team (2009)

Career NFL statistics
- Rushing yards: 2,032
- Rushing average: 3.3
- Rushing touchdowns: 17
- Receptions: 113
- Receiving yards: 912
- Receiving touchdowns: 2
- Stats at Pro Football Reference

Career CFL statistics
- Rushing yards: 259
- Rushing average: 5.4
- Rushing touchdowns: 2
- Stats at CFL.ca

Trenton Jamond Richardson (born July 10, 1990) is an American former professional football player who was a running back in the National Football League (NFL). He played college football for the Alabama Crimson Tide, where he was recognized as a unanimous All-American and was a member of two BCS National Championship teams.

Considered the top running back prospect for the 2012 NFL draft, Richardson was considered by some as the best running back prospect since Adrian Peterson, and was selected third overall by the Cleveland Browns. After being traded away from the Browns to the Indianapolis Colts during his second season, his production saw a massive decline. Having been out of the NFL after five seasons, he is sometimes considered one of the biggest draft busts in league history. He played for the Birmingham Iron of the Alliance of American Football in 2019 and led the league with 12 total touchdowns.

== Early life ==
Richardson was born in Pensacola, Florida. He played football at Escambia High School Richardson finished his senior season with 2,100 yards on 228 carries scoring 25 touchdowns. In a game against Milton High School in September 2008, Richardson rushed for 419 yards on 29 carries and scored six touchdowns, a performance that earned him a selection as the first ESPN RISE National Football Player of the Week. As a junior, Richardson also reached the 400-yard plateau, as he ran for 407 yards in his opening game against Tate High School. He finished his junior season (8 games) with 1,390 yards and 13 touchdowns, and received FSWA All-State 5A second team honors. He sat out his second year due to an injury. He made the FSWA 5A All-State First Team as a senior, and was named 5A Florida Player of the Year and a finalist for the 2008 Mr. Football. Richardson also received consensus All-American honors and was named to the Orlando Sentinel's All Southern Team (Florida).

Richardson also lettered in track & field at Escambia. In 2008, he captured a regional title in the 100-meter dash (10.81 s) and placed 5th at the state meet with a time of 10.9 seconds (World-class sprinter Jeff Demps won the event). He owned a personal-best time of 10.5 seconds in the 100 meters. In addition, he also participated in the long jump event and had a best-mark of 6.55 meters.

Richardson was frequently compared to Emmitt Smith, who also starred at Escambia (1987 graduate), but his physique and running style are more similar to Earl Campbell. Richardson also drew comparisons to Michael Turner and O. J. Simpson. Considered a five-star recruit by Rivals.com, Richardson was listed as the No. 2 running back prospect in the nation (behind only Bryce Brown). He chose Alabama over Florida, Florida State, and LSU, among others.

College recruiting
| Name | Hometown | School | Height | Weight | 40^{‡} | Commit date |
|---|---|---|---|---|---|---|
| Trent Richardson; RB | Pensacola, Florida | Escambia High School | 5 ft 11 in (1.80 m) | 225 lb (102 kg) | 4.17 | Jun 2, 2008 |
| Trent Richardson; RB | Recruit ratings: Scout: Rivals: (91) | | | | | |
Overall recruit ranking: Scout: 2 (RB) Rivals: 2 (RB) ESPN: 1 (RB)
Note: In many cases, Scout, Rivals, 247Sports, On3, and ESPN may conflict in their listings of height and weight.; In these cases, the average was taken. ESPN grades are on a 100-point scale.; Sources: "Alabama Football Commitments". Rivals.; "2009 Alabama Football Commits". Scout.; "ESPN". ESPN.; "Scout.com Team Recruiting Rankings". Scout.; "2009 Team Ranking". Rivals.com.

== College career ==
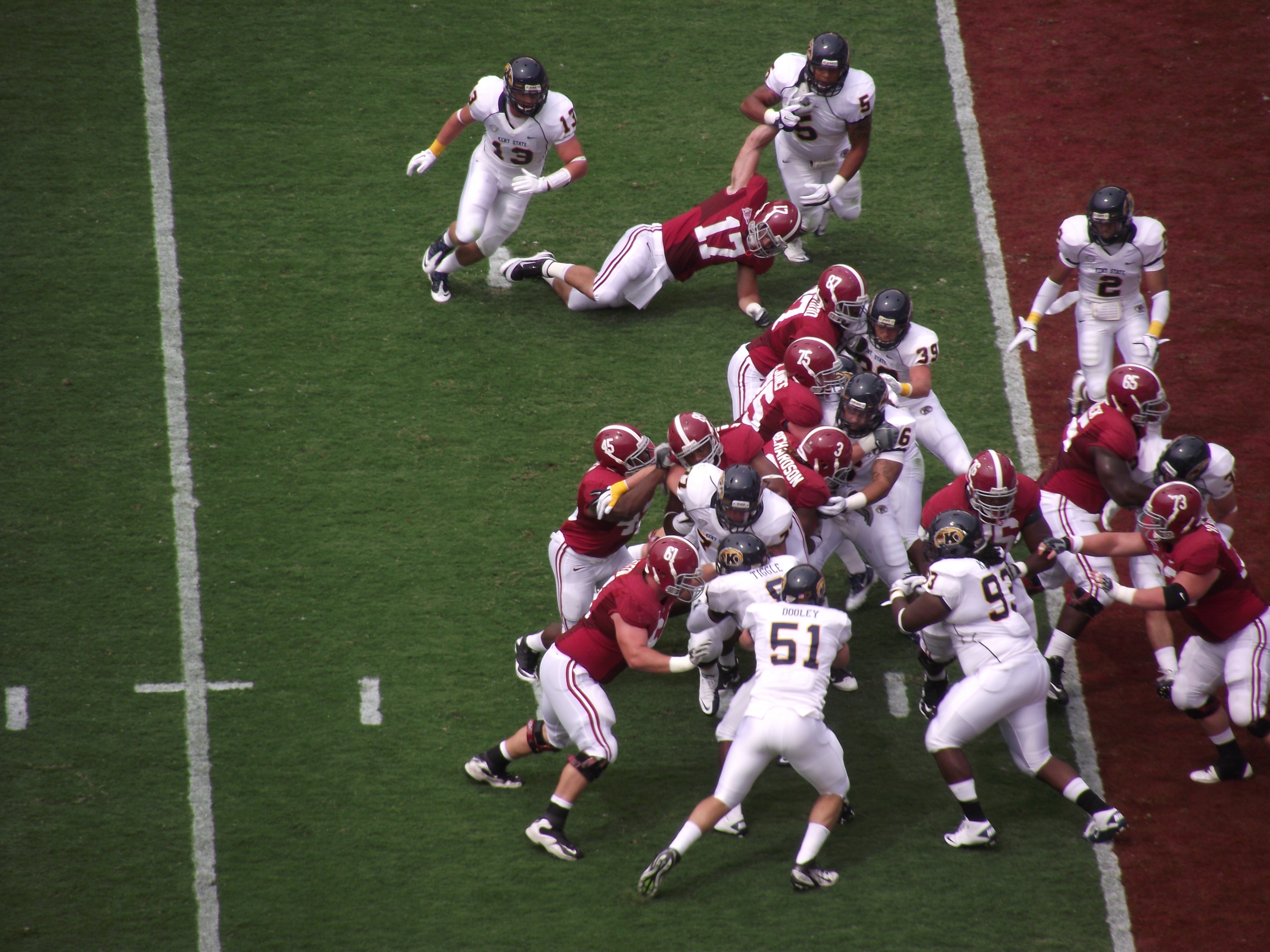
Richardson running the ball towards the endzone against the Kent State defensive line during his junior season at Alabama.

Richardson accepted an athletic scholarship to attend the University of Alabama, where he played for coach Nick Saban's Alabama Crimson Tide football team from 2009 to 2011.

=== 2009 season ===
In his first year at Alabama, Richardson stepped in quickly for the departed Glen Coffee, and shared time at the tailback position with Roy Upchurch and Mark Ingram, Jr. When recruited, Crimson Tide coach Nick Saban called Richardson, "the real key to the class," and "an outstanding player at a position that a young player can contribute next year."

In the second game of the season against Florida International, Richardson had 118 rushing yards and two rushing touchdowns in the 40–14 victory. Richardson was named SEC Freshman of the Week for Week 2 and Week 4. Richardson was also named to the 2009 SEC All-Freshman team alongside Barrett Jones and Nico Johnson. He also contributed significantly in the 2010 BCS National Championship against the Texas Longhorns with 109 yards rushing and 2 touchdowns. For the season, he had 145 carries for 751 rushing yards and eight rushing touchdowns. He had 16 receptions for 126 receiving yards on the season.

=== 2010 season ===
Richardson started the first two games of the season with Mark Ingram II sitting out due to an injury. In the season opener against San Jose State, he 112 scrimmage yards and two rushing touchdowns. The following week against Penn State, he ran for a career-high 144 yards on 22 carries and a touchdown. On October 16, Richardson had five receptions for 101 receiving yards and a receiving touchdown against Ole Miss. In the annual rivalry game against Tennessee, he had 12 carries for 118 rushing yards and a touchdown in the 41–10 victory.

For the season, he had 112 carries for 700 rushing yards and six rushing touchdowns and 266 receiving yards and four receiving touchdowns. Richardson also had 634 kick return yards with a touchdown on the year.

=== 2011 season ===
With the departure of Mark Ingram II to the NFL, Richardson took over the starting role at running back. During the season, Richardson ran for over 100 yards in nine games. He tied Shaun Alexander with six consecutive 100-yard rushing games. He scored two or more touchdowns in seven games. He set a career-high against Ole Miss running for 183 yards and four touchdowns. In the Iron Bowl, Richardson ran for a new career high of 203 yards in the 42–14 victory. He won the Doak Walker Award becoming the first player from Alabama to win. He finished third in the Heisman Trophy voting behind eventual winner Robert Griffin III and Andrew Luck. He was named the SEC Offensive Player of the Year and earned All-American honors. In the 2012 BCS National Championship Game, Richardson rushed for 96 yards and a touchdown to secure his second national championship with the Crimson Tide.

For the season, Richardson had 1,679 rushing yards, breaking Mark Ingram II's record for most rushing yards in a season, and 21 rushing touchdowns. His 21 rushing touchdowns were an SEC running back record. He also had 338 receiving yards with three touchdowns, making his season total touchdowns 24 which tied Shaun Alexander's SEC record. On January 12, 2012, Richardson declared for the 2012 NFL draft, thus forgoing his final year of collegiate eligibility. At the time of his announcement, he was projected as a first round pick and the top running back prospect in the draft.

== Professional career ==
=== Pre-draft ===
Entering his junior season, Richardson was widely regarded as the best running back available in the 2012 NFL draft, and he cemented his reputation with strong play over the course of the year. After undergoing a minor knee surgery in February 2012, Richardson did not participate in drills at the 2012 NFL Combine. He later also decided to skip workouts at the Alabama Pro Day on March 7. Richardson held his own Pro Day on March 29.

Pre-draft measurables
| Height | Weight | Arm length | Hand span | 40-yard dash | 10-yard split | 20-yard split | Vertical jump | Bench press |
|---|---|---|---|---|---|---|---|---|
| 5 ft 9 1/4 in (1.76 m) | 228 lb (103 kg) | 30 1/4 in (0.77 m) | 9 1/2 in (0.24 m) | 4.48 s | 1.56 s | 2.56 s | 37.0 in (0.94 m) | 25 reps |
All values from NFL Combine/Alabama's Pro Day

By March 2012, Richardson was widely projected to be a top six draft choice by the majority of analysts and scouts, with the Cleveland Browns, Tampa Bay Buccaneers, and St. Louis Rams rumored to be showing the most interest. Former Colts vice chairman Bill Polian called him one of the "three sure-thing players" in the 2012 draft.

=== Cleveland Browns ===
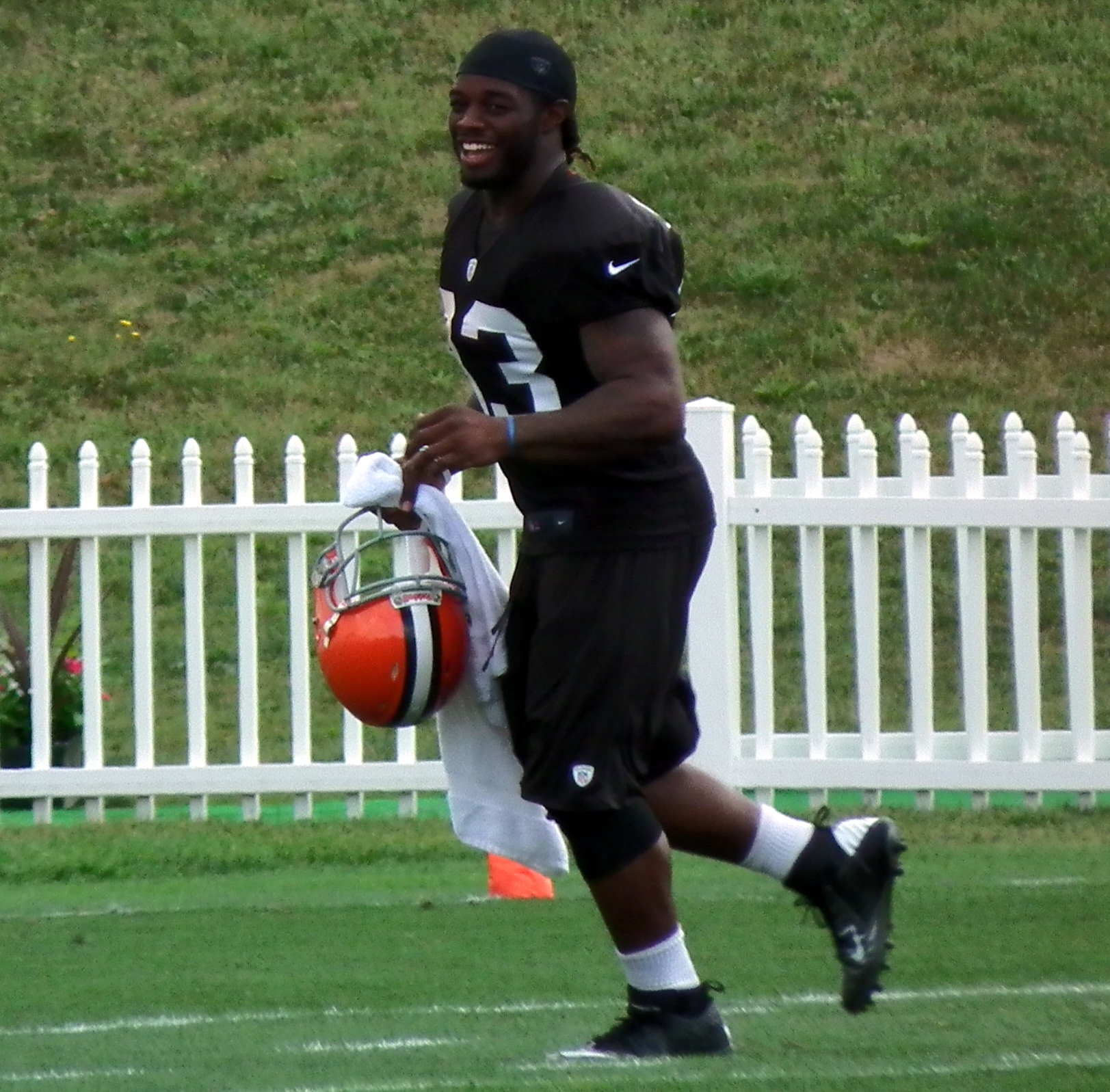
Richardson with the Cleveland Browns in 2012

Richardson was selected in the first round with the third overall pick by the Cleveland Browns, after they had traded picks with the Minnesota Vikings to select him ahead of the Tampa Bay Buccaneers. Richardson was the highest selected running back since Reggie Bush went second overall in 2006. The Browns had not selected a running back in the first round since William Green in 2002. On July 23, Richardson and the Browns agreed to a four-year, $20.4 million contract (fully guaranteed) with a $13.3 million signing bonus.

On August 9, 2012, Richardson underwent arthroscopic surgery to remove some cartilage fragments in his left knee. Richardson missed the entire preseason, but returned for the season opener. In his debut against the Philadelphia Eagles, he rushed for 39 yards on 19 carries, being limited in his touches after having just come back from injury. The following week, in a 24–34 loss against the Cincinnati Bengals, he rushed for 109 yards and a touchdown on 19 carries. He also had 4 receptions for 36 yards and a receiving touchdown. He was the first Browns rookie to rush for over 100 yards and score rushing and receiving touchdowns in the same game. During Week 13, against the Kansas City Chiefs, Richardson rushed for 42 yards and two touchdowns, tying Jim Brown's franchise rookie record of 9 touchdowns. He rushed for 3.6 yards per carry, which was the lowest yards per carry stat for a rookie running back in the NFL 2012 season.

Prior to the 2013 season, Richardson was ranked as the 71st best player in the NFL by his fellow players. Richardson would only play two games for the Browns in 2013 before being traded. He rushed for 105 yards on 31 carries in losses to the Miami Dolphins and Baltimore Ravens.

=== Indianapolis Colts ===
On September 18, 2013, Richardson was traded to the Indianapolis Colts for a 2014 first-round draft pick (which turned into Johnny Manziel).

The Colts were looking for a running back after a season-ending injury to Vick Ballard. In his first carry as a Colt, Richardson scored a one-yard touchdown against the San Francisco 49ers. He struggled through most of the season and was demoted in favor of Donald Brown on December 1, 2013. Richardson returned to his starting role in the Colts Week 15 game against the Houston Texans when Brown left due to injury, and recorded his first touchdown since Week 4 against Jacksonville. Richardson fumbled on his first career playoff carry against the Kansas City Chiefs in the Colts' Wild Card 45–44 victory.

Richardson began the 2014 season splitting carries with veteran running back Ahmad Bradshaw, limiting his carries and yardage totals. Bradshaw was injured in a Week 11 game against the New England Patriots, making Richardson the lead back. However, after Week 13, Dan Herron replaced Richardson as the Colts' primary running back after totaling 88 yards on just eight carries, including a 49-yard touchdown run. In the 2014–15 NFL playoffs, Richardson was not active for Indianapolis' final two playoff games. He was suspended by the team for the AFC Championship Game against the Patriots after he missed a walk-through for what he called a "family emergency" and did not alert the team. On March 12, 2015, the Colts waived Richardson.

=== Oakland Raiders ===
On March 17, 2015, Richardson signed a two-year, $3,850,000 contract with the Oakland Raiders. The deal included $600,000 guaranteed. He missed the first part of training camp due to a bout with pneumonia. On August 31, 2015, Richardson was released by the team.

=== Baltimore Ravens ===
On April 18, 2016, Richardson signed with the Baltimore Ravens, but was waived by the team on August 2, 2016.

=== Saskatchewan Roughriders ===
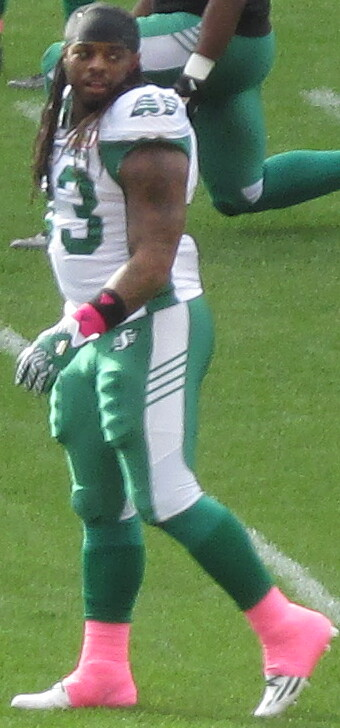
Richardson with the Saskatchewan Roughriders in 2017

In July 2017, the Saskatchewan Roughriders of the Canadian Football League added Richardson to their negotiation list. The following month, he announced his decision not to sign with the team. However, he eventually signed with the team on September 26, 2017. On October 27 against the Montreal Alouettes, Richardson suffered an ankle injury late in the game. He was placed on the injured list on November 1, and subsequently missed out on the playoffs. Richardson played in 4 games during the 2017 regular season, rushing 48 times for 259 yards and 2 touchdowns. His rushing totals, as well as his average yards per carry, increased each week. Richardson also recovered a fumble from quarterback Kevin Glenn during a quarterback sneak, and converted the first down. On May 10, 2018, Roughriders head coach Chris Jones announced that the team did not expect Richardson to report to the team's 2018 training camp on May 20, 2018. On May 20, after failing to report to training camp, the Riders placed Richardson on the suspended list. It was revealed that Richardson would lose custody of his children if he crossed the Canadian border, effectively keeping him from playing in the CFL, and so to allow Richardson to sign with the local franchise of the startup Alliance of American Football, he was released by the Roughriders on August 15, 2018.

=== Birmingham Iron ===
In 2018, Richardson signed with the Birmingham Iron of the Alliance of American Football for the 2019 AAF season. During the first game of the 2019 AAF season against the Memphis Express, Richardson carried for 58 yards in 23 carries, resulting in 2.5 yards per carry with two rushing touchdowns and one fumble. Richardson also recorded one catch, breaking several tackles for a 14 yard gain and a first down, as well as a two point conversion catch following his first touchdown. In later weeks, Richardson would be utilized more as a receiving back, in addition to rushing duties. Richardson caught his first touchdown in a week 6 victory against the San Diego Fleet, and scored at least one rushing touchdown in each game through eight weeks, including what would have been a playoff clinching game in week 8 against the Atlanta Legends. However, the AAF ceased football operation the following week, ending the season early after only eight of its 10 weeks were played. The league officially ceased operations on April 17, 2019. Richardson finished his time in the AAF's short existence as arguably the most productive player with the most rushes per game, and had a league best 12 total touchdowns.

=== Caudillos de Chihuahua ===
On February 11, 2021, Richardson signed with the Caudillos de Chihuahua of the Mexican Fútbol Americano de México (FAM) league. The Mexican media referred to the move as the biggest signing in Mexican pro football history. When asked of his role on the team, Richardson said "My role will be — we’ll have to let y’all know” and speculated that his role could vary from "making decisions" to "might being part of (the) D." The 2021 season was cancelled due to the COVID-19 pandemic. He saw limited playing time in his first game, the 2022 season opener, conceding snaps to LaVance Taylor in the 28–9 loss to the Parrilleros de Monterrey.

== Career statistics ==
=== Professional ===
==== Regular season ====
| Year | Team | League | Games | | Rushing | | | | | Receiving | | | | | Fumbles | |
| Year | Team | League | GP | GS | Att | Yds | Avg | Lng | TD | Rec | Yds | Avg | Lng | TD | Fum | Lost |
|---|---|---|---|---|---|---|---|---|---|---|---|---|---|---|---|---|
| 2012 | CLE | NFL | 15 | 15 | 267 | 950 | 3.6 | 32 | 11 | 51 | 367 | 7.2 | 27 | 1 | 3 | 0 |
| 2013 | CLE | NFL | 2 | 2 | 31 | 105 | 3.4 | 10 | 0 | 7 | 51 | 7.3 | 18 | 0 | 0 | 0 |
| 2013 | IND | NFL | 14 | 8 | 157 | 458 | 2.9 | 22 | 3 | 28 | 265 | 9.5 | 24 | 1 | 2 | 1 |
| 2014 | IND | NFL | 15 | 12 | 159 | 519 | 3.3 | 27 | 3 | 27 | 229 | 8.5 | 24 | 0 | 2 | 1 |
| 2017 | SSK | CFL | 4 | 1 | 48 | 259 | 5.4 | 38 | 2 | 1 | 2 | 2.0 | 2 | 0 | 0 | 0 |
| 2019 | BIR | AAF | 8 | 7 | 125 | 366 | 2.9 | 18 | 11 | 31 | 205 | 6.6 | 23 | 1 | 2 | 2 |
| NFL totals | | | 46 | 37 | 614 | 2,032 | 3.3 | 32 | 17 | 113 | 912 | 8.1 | 27 | 2 | 7 | 2 |

==== Postseason ====
| Year | Team | League | Games | | Rushing | | | | | Receiving | | | | | Fumbles | |
| Year | Team | League | GP | GS | Att | Yds | Avg | Lng | TD | Rec | Yds | Avg | Lng | TD | Fum | Lost |
|---|---|---|---|---|---|---|---|---|---|---|---|---|---|---|---|---|
| 2013 | IND | NFL | 2 | 0 | 4 | 1 | 0.2 | 2 | 0 | — | — | — | — | — | 1 | 1 |
| 2014 | IND | NFL | 1 | 0 | — | — | — | — | — | — | — | — | — | — | 0 | 0 |
| 2017 | SSK | CFL | 0 | 0 | Did not play due to injury | | | | | | | | | | | |
| NFL totals | | | 3 | 0 | 4 | 1 | 0.2 | 2 | 0 | 0 | 0 | 0.0 | 0 | 0 | 1 | 1 |

=== College ===
| Season | Team | Games | | Rushing | | | | | | | | Receiving | | | | | | Kick returns | | | | |
| Season | Team | GP | GS | Att | Gain | Loss | Net | Avg | Lng | TD | Y/G | Rec | Yds | Avg | Lng | TD | Y/G | Ret | Yds | Avg | Lng | TD |
|---|---|---|---|---|---|---|---|---|---|---|---|---|---|---|---|---|---|---|---|---|---|---|
| 2009 | Alabama | 14 | 0 | 145 | 784 | 33 | 751 | 5.2 | 52 | 8 | 53.6 | 16 | 126 | 7.9 | 17 | 0 | 9.0 | 1 | 20 | 20.0 | 20 | 0 |
| 2010 | Alabama | 10 | 3 | 112 | 719 | 19 | 700 | 6.2 | 65 | 6 | 53.8 | 23 | 266 | 11.6 | 85 | 4 | 24.2 | 24 | 634 | 26.4 | 91 | 1 |
| 2011 | Alabama | 13 | 1 | 283 | 1,740 | 61 | 1,679 | 5.9 | 76 | 21 | 129.2 | 29 | 338 | 11.7 | 61 | 3 | 26.0 | 3 | 66 | 22.0 | 24 | 0 |
| Total | | 37 | 4 | 540 | 3,243 | 113 | 3,130 | 5.8 | 76 | 35 | 75.9 | 64 | 730 | 10.4 | 85 | 7 | 20.3 | 28 | 720 | 25.7 | 91 | 1 |

== Personal life ==
Richardson has two daughters and three sons.
