= JaCorey Shepherd =

American football player (born 1993)

No. 36, 38
- Positions: Cornerback, kick returner

Personal information
- Born: March 29, 1993 (age 33); Mesquite, Texas, U.S.
- Listed height: 6 ft 0 in (1.83 m)
- Listed weight: 199 lb (90 kg)

Career information
- High school: John Horn (Mesquite)
- College: Kansas
- NFL draft: 2015: 6th round, 191st overall pick

Career history
- Philadelphia Eagles (2015–2016); San Francisco 49ers (2016); Pittsburgh Steelers (2017)*; Birmingham Iron (2019)
- * Offseason or practice squad member only

Awards and highlights
- First-team All-Big 12 (2014)

Career NFL statistics
- Total tackles: 2
- Return yards: 456
- Stats at Pro Football Reference

JaCorey Shepherd (born March 29, 1993) is an American former professional football player who was a cornerback and kick returner in the National Football League (NFL). He played college football for the Kansas Jayhawks, and was selected in the sixth round (191st overall) of the 2015 NFL draft by the Philadelphia Eagles.

Shepherd was also a member of the San Francisco 49ers, Pittsburgh Steelers, and Birmingham Iron.

== Professional career ==
=== Philadelphia Eagles ===
Shepherd was selected in the sixth round of the 2015 NFL draft as the 191st overall pick by the Philadelphia Eagles. On August 10, 2015, Shepherd tore his ACL keeping him out for the rest of the 2015 season. On September 3, 2016, he was released by the Eagles. He was re-signed to the practice squad on September 21, 2016. He was released on September 27, 2016 and re-signed on October 3, and was released again on October 7.

=== San Francisco 49ers ===
On October 10, 2016, Shepherd signed a two-year contract with the San Francisco 49ers.

On May 2, 2017, Shepherd was waived by the 49ers.

=== Pittsburgh Steelers ===
On August 5, 2017, Shepherd signed with the Pittsburgh Steelers. He was waived on September 2, 2017.

=== Birmingham Iron ===
In 2018, Shepherd signed with the Birmingham Iron of the Alliance of American Football for the 2019 season. He was waived before the start of the 2019 regular season, but was re-signed on March 1, 2019. He was waived again on March 25, and re-signed again on March 28. The league ceased operations in April 2019.
