= Braedon Bowman =

American football player (born 1994)

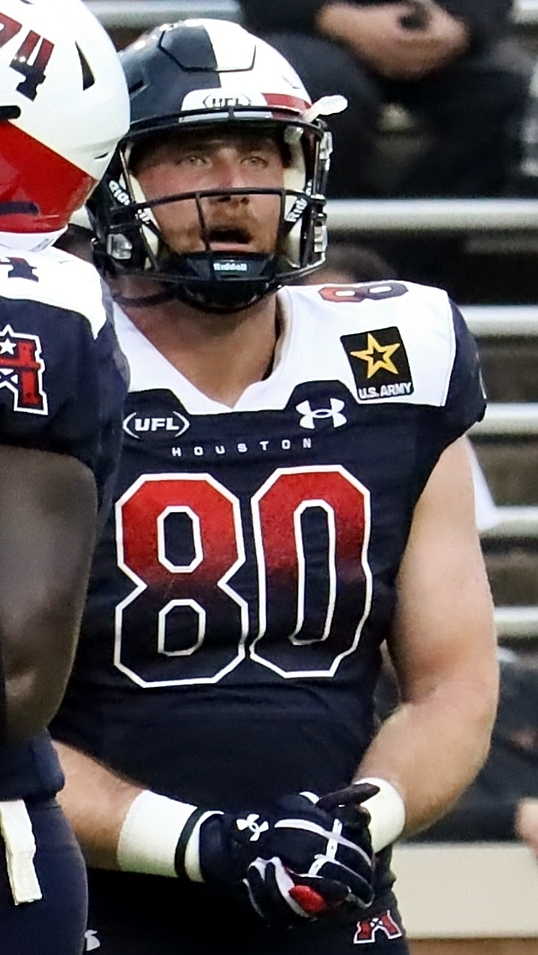
- Bowman with the Houston Roughnecks in 2024

No. 84, 80
- Position: Tight end

Personal information
- Born: January 30, 1994 (age 32); Mesa, Arizona, U.S.
- Listed height: 6 ft 4 in (1.93 m)
- Listed weight: 244 lb (111 kg)

Career information
- High school: Skyline (Mesa)
- College: South Alabama
- NFL draft: 2016: undrafted

Career history
- Jacksonville Jaguars (2016)*; New York Jets (2016); New Orleans Saints (2017)*; Los Angeles Chargers (2017–2018)*; Birmingham Iron (2019); New Jersey Generals (2022–2023); Houston Roughnecks (2024)
- * Offseason or practice squad member only

Career NFL statistics
- Total tackles: 2
- Stats at Pro Football Reference

Braedon Dean Bowman (born January 30, 1994) is an American former professional football player who was a tight end in the National Football League (NFL). He played college football for the South Alabama Jaguars and was signed by the Jacksonville Jaguars as an undrafted free agent in 2016.

== Early life ==
Bowman was born in 1994 in Mesa, Arizona as the second eldest of four children to parents Laura Becker and Warren Bowman. He attended Skyline High School in his hometown where he played wide receiver with the Coyotes football team. During two years of football, Bowman earned two letters.

Bowman also earned a letter in baseball while in high school. Standing 6 ft 4 in (1.93 m) and weighing 190 pounds (86 kg), Bowman played center in basketball, earning a letter that made him a three-sport standout. He graduated in 2012.

== College career ==
Bowman played junior college football as a walk-on with the Scottsdale Fighting Artichokes while attending Scottsdale Community College. Between the 2012 and 2013 semesters, Bowman earned first-team junior college and conference honors. While at Scottsdale CC, Bowman was rated a two-star recruit, receiving offers from Wyoming, Northern Colorado, Jacksonville State, Georgia State, Georgia Southern and South Alabama.

Bowman began his junior season at the University of South Alabama in 2014. He joined the South Alabama Jaguars as a tight end, starting 5 of 11 games before sustaining a broken foot during his fourth start. He caught 18 passes and made 15 receptions. As a senior during the 2016 season, Bowman finished with 11 catches. For the two seasons played at South Alabama, Bowman ranked as the second best tight end on the team in receptions and receiving yards. While attending South Alabama, Bowman majored in criminal justice, preparing for a possible career in law enforcement.

== Professional career ==
=== Jacksonville Jaguars ===
On May 1, 2016, Bowman signed with the Jacksonville Jaguars as an undrafted free agent. On September 3, he was released by the Jaguars.

=== New York Jets ===
On September 4, 2016, Bowman was claimed off waivers by the New York Jets. On September 13, he was waived by the Jets but was re-signed on September 23. He was placed on injured reserve on October 22, with a torn ACL.

On May 30, 2017, Bowman was waived by the Jets.

=== New Orleans Saints ===
On August 12, 2017, Bowman was signed by the New Orleans Saints. On September 2, Bowman was waived by the Saints.

=== Los Angeles Chargers ===
On September 6, 2017, Bowman was signed to the Los Angeles Chargers' practice squad. He was released on November 15, but was re-signed two days later. Bowman signed a reserve/future contract with the Chargers on January 1, 2018. On September 1, Bowman was waived by the Chargers.

=== Birmingham Iron ===
For the 2019 campaign, Bowman joined the Birmingham Iron of the Alliance of American Football. He was placed on injured reserve on February 14, 2019. Bowman was activated from injured reserve on March 19. The league ceased operations in April of the same year.

=== New Jersey Generals ===
Bowman was selected by the New Jersey Generals in the 34th round (Round of TEs) of the 2022 USFL draft. He was transferred to the team's inactive roster on May 12 with a quadriceps injury.

Bowman re-signed with the Generals on July 14, 2023. The Generals folded when the XFL and USFL merged to create the United Football League (UFL).

=== Houston Roughnecks ===
On January 5, 2024, Bowman was selected by the Houston Roughnecks during the 2024 UFL dispersal draft. He signed with the team on February 27. Bowman was released by Houston on July 23.

== Personal life ==
Bowman's favorite movie is Happy Gilmore. As a sports fan, his favorite football team is the Arizona Cardinals and his favorite basketball team is the Oklahoma City Thunder. His hobbies include hunting, fishing and music. In football, Bowman listed Eric Decker and Larry Fitzgerald as his favorite players.
