= Ryan Winslow =

American football player (born 1994)

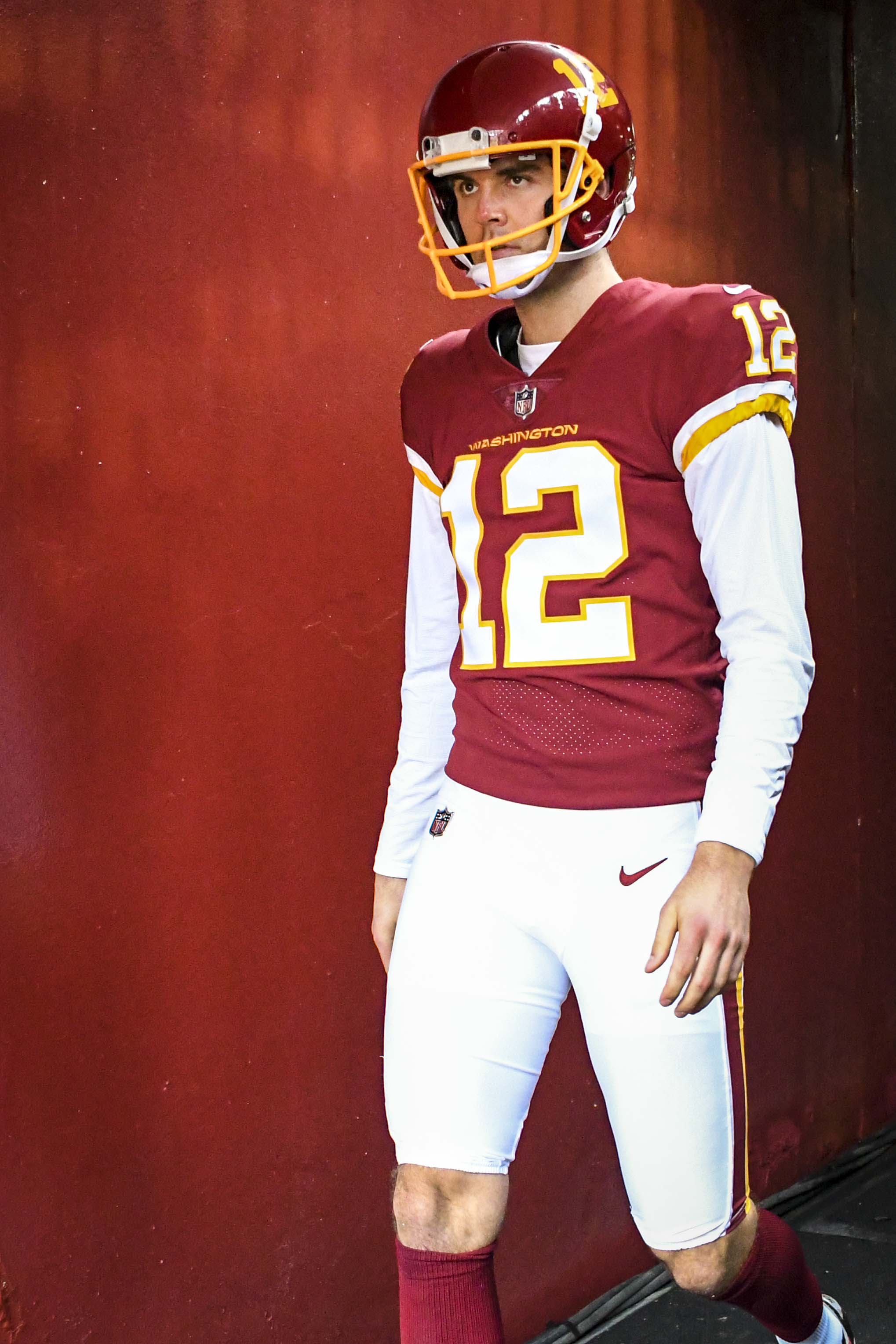
- Winslow with the Washington Football Team in January 2022

No. 9, 10, 16, 12
- Position: Punter

Personal information
- Born: April 30, 1994 (age 32); Philadelphia, Pennsylvania. U.S.
- Listed height: 6 ft 5 in (1.96 m)
- Listed weight: 217 lb (98 kg)

Career information
- High school: La Salle College (Wyndmoor, Pennsylvania)
- College: Pittsburgh
- NFL draft: 2018: undrafted

Career history
- Chicago Bears (2018)*; San Diego Fleet (2019); Memphis Express (2019); Arizona Cardinals (2019); Green Bay Packers (2020–2021)*; Arizona Cardinals (2021)*; Carolina Panthers (2021); Arizona Cardinals (2021); Washington Football Team (2021); San Francisco 49ers (2021)*; Chicago Bears (2022)*
- * Offseason or practice squad member only

Awards and highlights
- First-team All-ACC (2017)

Career NFL statistics
- Punts: 22
- Punting yards: 916
- Average punt: 41.6
- Inside 20: 5
- Stats at Pro Football Reference

Ryan Henry Winslow (born April 30, 1994) is an American former professional football player who was a punter in the National Football League (NFL). He played college football for the Pittsburgh Panthers.

== Early life ==
Winslow attended and played high school football at La Salle College High School.

== College career ==
Winslow was a member of the Pittsburgh Panthers for five seasons, redshirting as a true freshman. As a redshirt senior, Winslow averaged 44.5 yards on 57 punts and was named first-team All-Atlantic Coast Conference.

== Professional career ==
=== Chicago Bears ===
Winslow was signed by the Chicago Bears as an undrafted free agent on April 28, 2018. He was cut by the Bears at the end of training camp on August 31, 2018.

=== San Diego Fleet ===
Winslow was signed by the San Diego Fleet of the Alliance of American Football (AAF) after the team's original punter, Australian Sam Irwin-Hill, encountered visa issues and played in the league's first game, punting five times for an average of 44.0 yards. He was cut the following week after Irwin-Hill's visa was approved.

=== Memphis Express ===
Winslow was signed by the AAF's Memphis Express on February 27, 2019. He served as the team's punter until the AAF ceased operations, averaging 48.4 yards on 27 punts.

=== Arizona Cardinals ===
Winslow was signed by the Arizona Cardinals on May 2, 2019. He was waived at the end of training camp as part of final roster cuts. Winslow was re-signed by the Cardinals to their practice squad on September 24, 2019 following an injury to Andy Lee and promoted to the active roster on September 28. He made his NFL debut the next day against the Seattle Seahawks. He was waived on October 8, 2019. Winslow was signed to a futures contract on December 30, 2019. He was waived on September 4, 2020.

=== Green Bay Packers ===
Winslow was signed to the Green Bay Packers' practice squad on December 26, 2020. He was released on January 21, 2021, and re-signed to the practice squad two days later. He signed a reserve/futures contract with the Packers on January 25. He was waived on August 16, 2021.

=== Arizona Cardinals (second stint) ===
On August 17, 2021, Winslow was claimed off waivers by the Arizona Cardinals. He was waived on August 30, 2021.

=== Carolina Panthers ===
On October 14, 2021, Winslow was signed to the Carolina Panthers practice squad. He was promoted to the active roster on October 19. He was waived on October 26.

=== Arizona Cardinals (third stint) ===
On December 23, 2021, Winslow was signed to the Arizona Cardinals practice squad. He was released on December 29.

=== Washington Football Team ===
On December 31, 2021, Winslow was signed to the Washington Football Team's practice squad after starter Tress Way contracted COVID-19. Winslow was released on January 4, 2022.

=== San Francisco 49ers ===
On January 12, 2022, Winslow was signed to the San Francisco 49ers practice squad. He was released on January 18, 2022.

=== Chicago Bears (second stint) ===
Winslow signed a reserve/futures contract with the Bears on February 16, 2022. He was waived on May 17.

== NFL career statistics ==
=== Regular season ===
Year	Team	GP	Punting								
Year	Team	GP	Punts	Yds	Lng	Avg	Net Avg	Blk	Ins20	Ret	RetY
2019	ARI	2	6	291	55	48.5	44.2	0	2	4	6
Total		2	6	291	55	48.5	44.2	0	2	4	6
Source: NFL.com

== Personal life ==
Winslow is the son of former Cleveland Browns and New Orleans Saints punter George Winslow.
