= Mike Bercovici =

American football player and coach (born 1993)

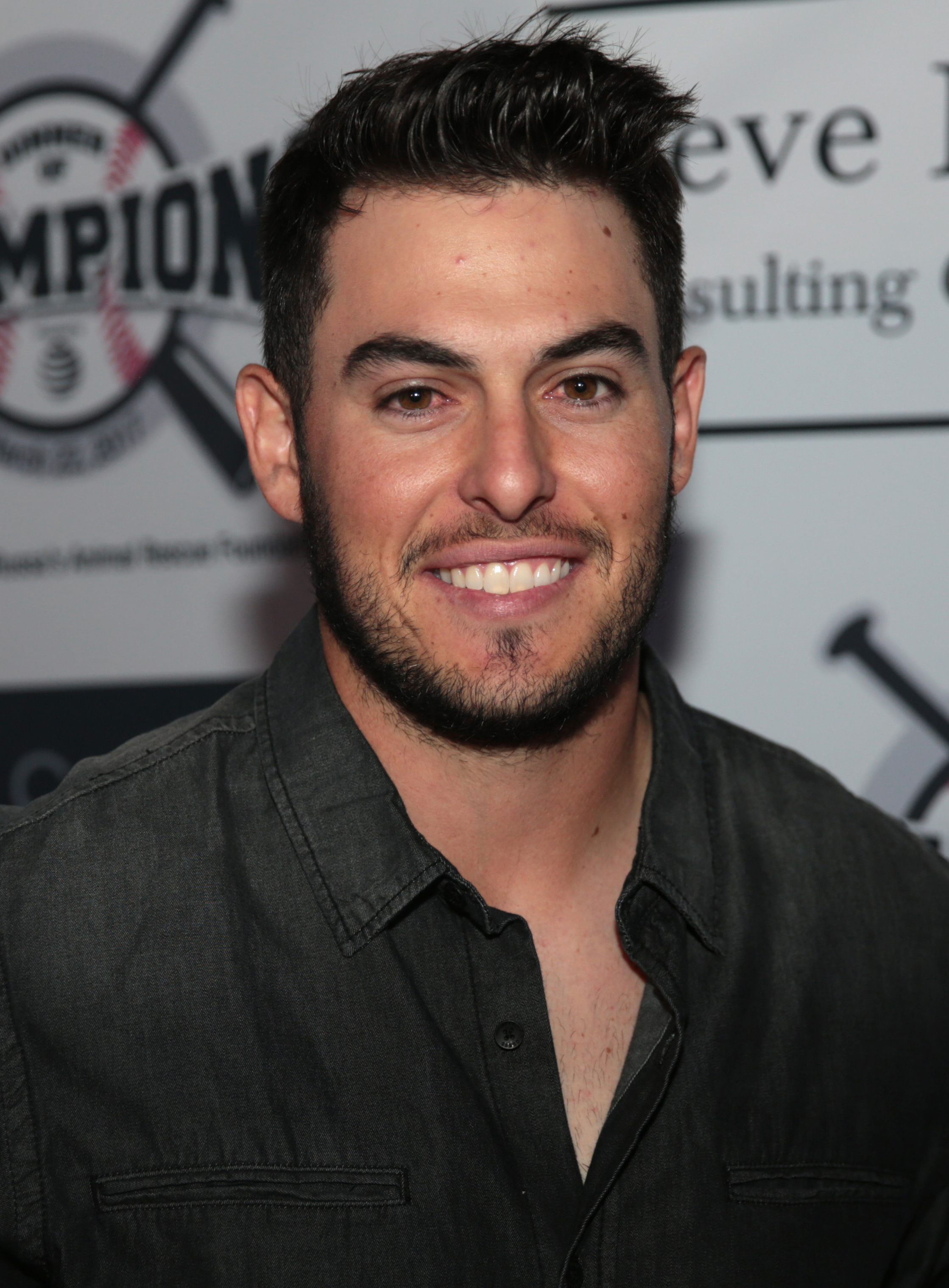
- Bercovici in 2017

Carolina Panthers
- Title: Passing game coordinator

Personal information
- Born: February 9, 1993 (age 33); Northridge, California, U.S.
- Listed height: 6 ft 0 in (1.83 m)
- Listed weight: 209 lb (95 kg)

Career information
- Position: Quarterback
- High school: William Howard Taft (Woodland Hills, California)
- College: Arizona State (2011–2015)
- NFL draft: 2016: undrafted

Career history

Playing
- San Diego / Los Angeles Chargers (2016–2017)*; Arizona Cardinals (2017)*; Arizona Hotshots (2019)*; San Diego Fleet (2019)
- * Offseason or practice squad member only

Coaching
- Arizona State (2019) Graduate assistant; Arizona Cardinals (2020–2022); Coaching assistant (2020-2021); Offensive assistant (2022); Carolina Panthers (2023-present); Offensive assistant (2023-2024); Assistant quarterbacks coach/pass game specialist (2025); Passing game coordinator (2026-present)
- Stats at Pro Football Reference

Michael Bercovici (born February 9, 1993) is an American football coach and former quarterback who currently serves as an offensive pass game coordinator for the Carolina Panthers of the National Football League (NFL). He played college football for the Arizona State Sun Devils. He signed with the San Diego Chargers as an undrafted free agent after the 2016 NFL draft and has also spent time with the Arizona Cardinals and San Diego Fleet.

== Early life ==
Bercovici was born in Northridge, California. He attended Taft High School in Los Angeles. As a senior, he was 240-of-399 passes (60.2%) for 3,755 yards with 37 touchdowns and only nine interceptions in 2010, he also recorded 103 rushing yards with three touchdowns.

He was rated by PrepStar as the 91st overall prospect in the nation, and the seventh overall quarterback in the nation. He was also ranked the 14th overall pro-style quarterback in the nation by Rivals.com. He was offered an athletic scholarship to Arizona State University in June 2010, he accepted the scholarship a week later.

== College career ==
As a true freshman in 2011, Bercovici appeared in three games. He completed 2-of-3 passes for 15 yards. In 2012, he redshirted the season. As a redshirt sophomore in 2013, he appeared in four games as holder on special teams. He completed 3-of-4 (75%) for 18 yards and a quarterback rating of 112.8. He also rushed the ball 10 times for 46 yards. As a redshirt junior in 2014, he appeared in eight games (three starts). He replaced starter Taylor Kelly after Kelly was injured. Becovici complete 115-of-186 (61.8%) for 1,445 yards and 12 touchdowns and four interceptions. He also rushed the ball 26 times for 16 yards. As a redshirt senior in 2015, he was named the starting quarterback. He was a unanimous team captain and member of the team's leadership council. He started all 13 games. He completed 318-of-531 (59-.9%) for 3,854 yards, 30 touchdowns and nine interceptions. He also rushed the ball 109 times for 84 yards. His 30 touchdowns tied the Arizona State school record for most touchdown passes in a single season. His 531 passing attempts set the record for most passing attempts in a single season in school history.

On October 4, 2014 Bercovici threw a 46-yard Hail Mary with time expiring to beat USC in the Los Angeles Memorial Coliseum 38–34. Bercovici ended the game with a record-setting performance, throwing for 510 yards and 5 touchdowns – the most ever thrown by a USC opponent.

Bercovici graduated from Arizona State with a Bachelor of Science degree in Business management in 2014 and a Master's Degree in Sports law and Business in 2015.

=== Statistics ===
Year	Team	Games			Passing								Rushing			
Year	Team	GP	GS	Record	Cmp	Att	Pct	Yds	Avg	TD	INT	Rtg	Att	Yds	Avg	TD
2011	Arizona State	3	0	—	2	3	66.7	15	5.0	0	0	108.7	0	0	0.0	0
2012	Arizona State	Redshirt														
2013	Arizona State	4	0	—	3	4	75.0	18	4.5	0	0	112.8	10	46	4.6	0
2014	Arizona State	13	3	2–1	115	186	61.8	1,445	7.8	12	4	144.1	26	16	0.6	0
2015	Arizona State	13	13	6–7	319	532	60.0	3,861	7.3	30	9	136.2	109	84	0.8	6
Career		33	16	8–8	439	725	60.6	5,339	7.4	42	13	137.9	145	146	1.0	6

== Professional career ==
Pre-draft measurables
Height	Weight	Arm length	Hand span	40-yard dash	10-yard split	20-yard split	20-yard shuttle	Three-cone drill	Vertical jump	Broad jump
6 ft 0 1/2 in (1.84 m)	206 lb (93 kg)	30 3/8 in (0.77 m)	9 3/8 in (0.24 m)	4.84 s	1.64 s	2.81 s	4.27 s	6.82 s	28.0 in (0.71 m)	8 ft 10 in (2.69 m)
All values from Arizona State's Pro Day

=== San Diego / Los Angeles Chargers ===
After going undrafted in the 2016 NFL draft, Bercovici was signed by the San Diego Chargers. He was eventually featured on the NFL Network show Undrafted. On September 3, 2016, he was released by the Chargers during the final roster cuts. He signed a reserve/future contract with the Chargers on January 10, 2017. He was waived on September 2, 2017.

=== Arizona Cardinals ===
On October 24, 2017, Bercovici was signed to the Arizona Cardinals' practice squad. On November 30, 2017, he was released by the Cardinals.

=== San Diego Fleet ===
In 2018, Bercovici signed with the Arizona Hotshots of the newly-formed Alliance of American Football, but was later drafted by the San Diego Fleet with their second-round pick in the league's quarterback draft in November.

Bercovici began the 2019 AAF season as the Fleet's starting quarterback. In the opener against the San Antonio Commanders, he was hit by Shaan Washington in an impact that knocked his helmet off, but continued to play. Bercovici struggled in the 15–6 loss as he was sacked six times and threw two interceptions before being replaced by Philip Nelson. League offices credited Bercovici for being a sacrificial lamb for the league, as the hit provided viral buzz for the league on social media despite an otherwise mediocre on-field product.

Nelson was eventually announced as the starter for the following week's game against the Atlanta Legends. In early March, Bercovici returned to the starting role against the Salt Lake Stallions after Nelson suffered a clavicle fracture in the previous game and was placed on injured reserve; Bercovici completed 22 of 43 passes for 304 yards with a touchdown and interception, including a 45-yard throw to Dontez Ford on the final drive that set up Donny Hageman's game-winning field goal to clinch a 27–25 San Diego victory. The league ceased operations in April 2019.

== Career statistics ==
Year	Team	League	Games			Passing								Rushing			
Year	Team	League	GP	GS	Record	Cmp	Att	Pct	Yds	Y/A	TD	Int	Rtg	Att	Yds	Avg	TD
2019	SD	AAF	5	5	1–4	98	192	51.0	1,311	6.8	5	9	62.2	9	22	2.4	0
Career			5	5	1–4	98	192	51.0	1,311	6.8	5	9	62.2	9	22	2.4	0

== Coaching career ==
In May 2019, Bercovici returned to Arizona State as a graduate assistant. ASU head coach Herm Edwards had approached Bercovici about the position in January, but he declined in order to play in the AAF.

=== Arizona Cardinals ===
In 2020, Bercovici joined the Arizona Cardinals' coaching staff as an entry-level assistant to head coach Kliff Kingsbury. On May 10, 2022, Bercovici was promoted to offensive assistant.

=== Carolina Panthers ===
In 2023, Bercovici joined the Carolina Panthers as an offensive assistant to head coach Frank Reich. Upon Reich's departure from the franchise and the hiring of Dave Canales, he retained his role for the 2024 season.

For the 2025 season, Bercovici joined the Carolina Panthers coaching staff as an assistant quarterbacks coach/pass game specialist to head coach Dave Canales.

Bercovici received an upgraded position within the Carolina Panthers organization for the 2026 season. He will serve as the pass game coordinator.
