= Koloamatangi =

Koloamatangi is a surname. Notable people with the surname include:

- Keaon Koloamatangi (born 1998), Tongan rugby league player
- Leo Koloamatangi (born 1994), American football player
- Meffy Koloamatangi (born 1995), American gridiron player
- Tau Koloamatangi (born 1995), New Zealand rugby union player
- Tautuiaki Taula Koloamatangi (born 1991), American professional wrestler
- Tevita Koloamatangi (born 1988), New Zealand rugby union player
