= Alek Torgersen =

American football player (born 1995)

Profile
- Position: Quarterback

Personal information
- Born: January 13, 1995 (age 31); Huntington Beach, California
- Listed height: 6 ft 2 in (1.88 m)
- Listed weight: 229 lb (104 kg)

Career information
- High school: Edison (CA)
- College: Penn
- NFL draft: 2017: undrafted

Career history
- Atlanta Falcons (2017)*; Washington Redskins (2017)*; Detroit Lions (2017–2018)*; Arizona Cardinals (2018)*; Arizona Hotshots (2019)*; Birmingham Iron (2019)*; San Diego Fleet (2019)
- * Offseason or practice squad member only
- Stats at Pro Football Reference

Alek Torgersen (born January 13, 1995) is an American former football quarterback. He played college football at Penn.

== Professional career ==
=== Atlanta Falcons ===
Torgersen signed with the Atlanta Falcons as an undrafted free agent on May 1, 2017. He was waived by the Falcons on September 2, 2017.

=== Washington Redskins ===
On September 4, 2017, Torgersen was signed to the Washington Redskins' practice squad. He was released on October 3, 2017.

=== Detroit Lions ===
On December 27, 2017, Torgersen was signed to the Detroit Lions' practice squad. He signed a reserve/future contract with the Lions on January 1, 2018.

On April 4, 2018, he was waived by the Lions.

=== Arizona Cardinals ===
On April 5, 2018, Torgersen was claimed off waivers by the Arizona Cardinals. He was waived on May 7, 2018.

=== Arizona Hotshots ===
On August 6, 2018, Torgersen signed with the Arizona Hotshots of the AAF for the 2019 season.

=== Birmingham Iron ===
Torgersen was drafted by the Birmingham Iron on November 27, 2018 in the 2019 AAF QB Draft. He was waived by the Iron on January 15, 2019, before the start of the regular season.

=== San Diego Fleet ===
During the 2019 AAF season, Torgersen was picked up by the San Diego Fleet after starting quarterback Philip Nelson was placed on injured reserve on March 4. The league ceased operations in April 2019.
