= Alex Ross (gridiron football) =

American gridiron football player (born 1992)

No. 9, 5, 4
- Position: Quarterback

Personal information
- Born: September 25, 1992 (age 34); Alpharetta, Georgia, U.S.
- Listed height: 6 ft 0 in (1.83 m)
- Listed weight: 199 lb (90 kg)

Career information
- High school: Buford High School
- College: Coastal Carolina
- NFL draft: 2016: undrafted

Career history
- BC Lions (2017); Winnipeg Blue Bombers (2018); Memphis Express (2019)*; San Diego Fleet (2019)
- * Offseason or practice squad member only

Career CFL statistics
- Passing completions: 5
- Passing attempts: 13
- Passing yards: 82
- TD–INT: 0–2
- Stats at CFL.ca

Alex Ross (born September 25, 1992) is a former American professional gridiron football quarterback. He previously played for the BC Lions, Winnipeg Blue Bombers, and San Diego Fleet. He played college football at Coastal Carolina.

== College career ==
Ross played college football for the Coastal Carolina Chanticleers from 2011 to 2015.

== Professional career ==
In April 2016, Ross was invited to rookie minicamp on a tryout basis with the Atlanta Falcons.

He signed with the BC Lions in January 2017. In April 2018, Ross was released by the Lions and then signed by the Winnipeg Blue Bombers. He was let go in September.

In October 2018, Ross signed with the Memphis Express. However, he was selected by the San Diego Fleet with the last pick of the 2019 AAF QB Draft. During the fourth game of the 2019 AAF season against the Express, Ross replaced an injured Philip Nelson in the second quarter; he completed 8 of 18 passes for 80 yards, a touchdown (to Marcus Baugh) and an interception, and lost two fumbles in the 26–23 loss. The league ceased operations in April 2019.

=== Statistics ===
Year	Team	Games		Passing								Rushing				Sacked		Fumbles	
Year	Team	GP	GS	Comp	Att	Pct	Yds	Avg	TD	Int	Rate	Att	Yds	Avg	TD	Sck	SckY	FUM	Lost
2019	SD	1	0	8	18	44.4	80	4.4	1	1	53.0	6	33	5.5	0	4	10	3	2
Career		1	0	8	18	44.4	80	4.4	1	1	53.0	6	33	5.5	0	4	10	3	2
