= Greg Ducre =

American football player (born 1992)

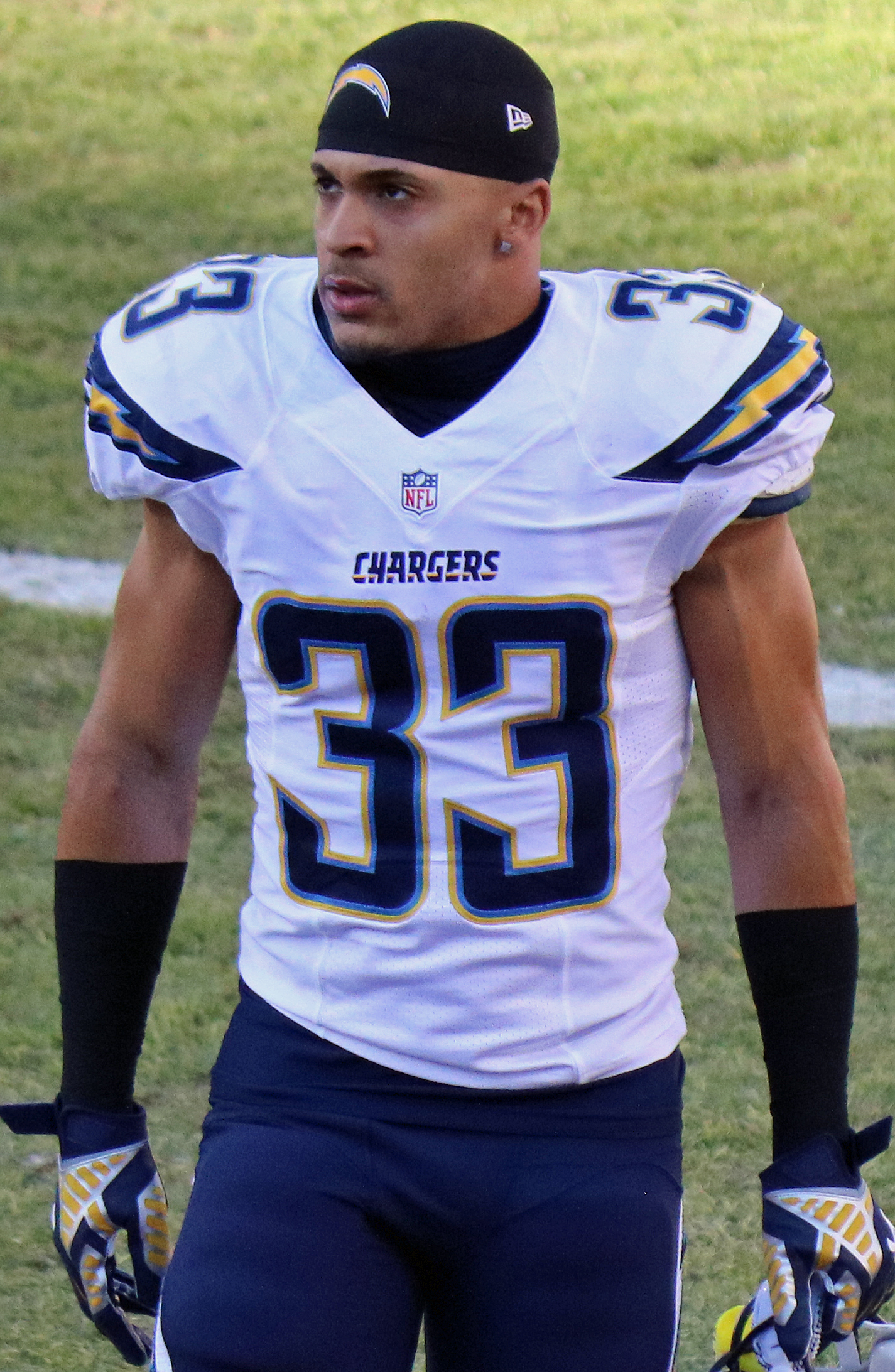
- Ducre with the San Diego Chargers in 2015

No. 38, 33
- Position: Cornerback

Personal information
- Born: January 22, 1992 (age 34); Los Angeles, California, U.S.
- Listed height: 5 ft 10 in (1.78 m)
- Listed weight: 185 lb (84 kg)

Career information
- High school: Crenshaw (Los Angeles)
- College: Washington
- NFL draft: 2014: undrafted

Career history
- San Diego Chargers (2014)*; Washington Redskins (2014); San Diego Chargers (2014–2015); BC Lions (2016)*; Pittsburgh Steelers (2017); Montreal Alouettes (2018); San Diego Fleet (2019); Calgary Stampeders (2021)*
- * Offseason or practice squad member only

Career NFL statistics
- Total tackles: 10
- Pass deflections: 2
- Interceptions: 1
- Stats at Pro Football Reference
- Stats at CFL.ca

Gregory Ducre (born January 22, 1992) is an American former professional football player who was a cornerback in the National Football League (NFL). He played college football for the Washington Huskies. He signed with the San Diego Chargers as an undrafted free agent in 2014.

== Professional career ==
=== San Diego Chargers ===
On May 10, 2014, Ducre signed with the San Diego Chargers after going unselected in the 2014 NFL draft. He was waived by the team on August 30 for final roster cuts, but was signed to their practice squad the next day.

=== Washington Redskins ===
The Washington Redskins signed Ducre off the Chargers' practice squad on October 8, 2014. He recorded his first career interception against San Francisco 49ers quarterback Colin Kaepernick after filling in for an injured Tracy Porter, who started in place for an inactive David Amerson. Ducre was released by the team on December 9.

=== Los Angeles Chargers (second stint) ===
After being released by the Redskins, the Los Angeles Chargers signed Ducre to their practice squad. He was promoted to the active roster on December 15, 2014.

=== BC Lions ===
Ducre signed to the BC Lions' practice roster October 18, 2016, but was allowed to try out with the Indianapolis Colts during October.

=== Pittsburgh Steelers ===
On January 30, 2017, Ducre signed a reserve/future contract with the Pittsburgh Steelers. He was waived/injured by the Steelers on August 23, and placed on injured reserve.

=== San Diego Fleet ===
On October 14, 2018, Ducre signed with the San Diego Fleet. The league ceased operations in April 2019.

=== Calgary Stampeders ===
Ducre signed with the Calgary Stampeders on January 25, 2021. Ducre was released by the Stampeders on July 29.
