= Daniel Brunskill =

American football player (born 1994)

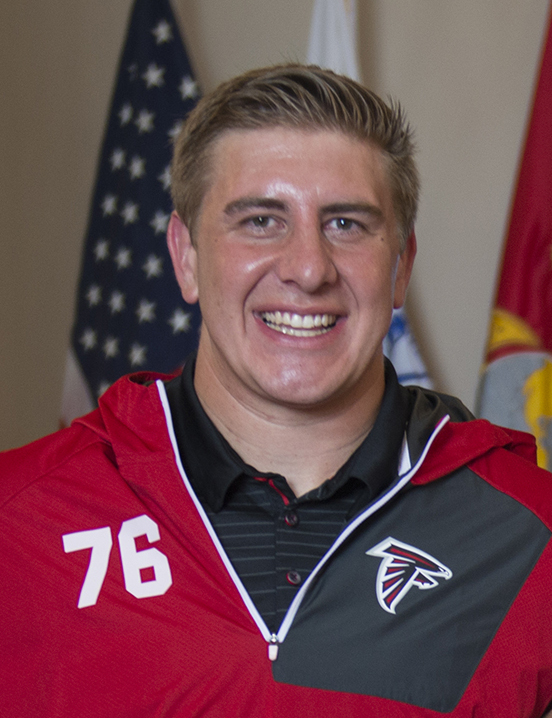
- Brunskill with the Atlanta Falcons in 2017

Profile
- Position: Guard

Personal information
- Born: January 27, 1994 (age 32); San Diego, California, U.S.
- Listed height: 6 ft 5 in (1.96 m)
- Listed weight: 260 lb (118 kg)

Career information
- High school: Valley Center (Valley Center, California)
- College: San Diego State (2012–2016)
- NFL draft: 2017: undrafted

Career history
- Atlanta Falcons (2017–2018)*; San Diego Fleet (2019); San Francisco 49ers (2019–2022); Tennessee Titans (2023–2024); Miami Dolphins (2025); Washington Commanders (2026)*; Los Angeles Chargers (2026)
- * Offseason or practice squad member only

Career NFL statistics as of Week 10, 2026
- Games played: 110
- Games started: 71
- Stats at Pro Football Reference

Daniel Zachary Brunskill (born January 27, 1994) is an American professional football guard. He played college football for the San Diego State Aztecs and was signed as an undrafted free agent by the Atlanta Falcons in 2017. Brunskill has also played for the San Diego Fleet of the Alliance of American Football (AAF), as well as, the San Francisco 49ers, Tennessee Titans, Miami Dolphins, and Washington Commanders of the National Football League (NFL).

== Early life ==
Brunskill played as a tight end for Valley Center High School in Valley Center, California, where he received an award for all-league in the lineman category under coach Rob Gilster.

== Professional career ==
Pre-draft measurables
Height	Weight	Arm length	Hand span	Wingspan	40-yard dash	10-yard split	20-yard split	20-yard shuttle	Three-cone drill	Vertical jump	Broad jump	Bench press
6 ft 5 1/8 in (1.96 m)	273 lb (124 kg)	33 7/8 in (0.86 m)	9 7/8 in (0.25 m)	6 ft 7 3/8 in (2.02 m)	5.20 s	1.84 s	2.95 s	4.78 s	7.64 s	28.5 in (0.72 m)	9 ft 1 in (2.77 m)	23 reps
All values from NFL Combine/Pro Day

=== Atlanta Falcons ===
Brunskill signed with the Atlanta Falcons as an undrafted free agent on May 1, 2017. He was waived by the Falcons on September 2, 2017, but was signed to the practice squad the next day. He signed a reserve/future contract with the Falcons on January 15, 2018.

On September 1, 2018, Brunskill was waived by the Falcons and was signed to the practice squad the next day.

=== San Diego Fleet ===
In January 2019, Brunskill joined the San Diego Fleet of the newly formed Alliance of American Football (AAF).

=== San Francisco 49ers ===
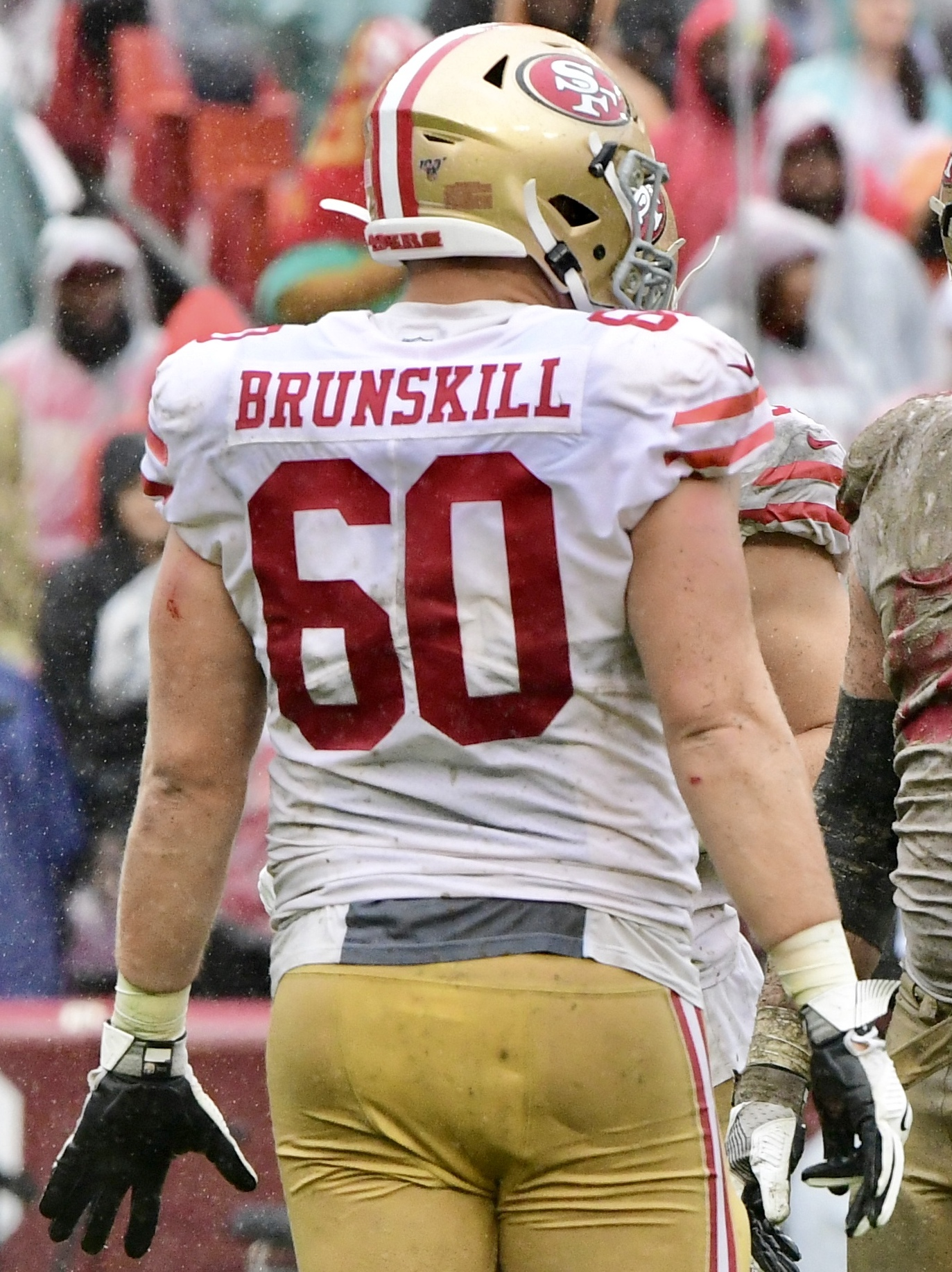
Brunskill with the San Francisco 49ers in 2019

On April 11, 2019, Brunskill signed with the San Francisco 49ers. During the 2019 season, he played 14 regular season games with seven starts at both right tackle and right guard, along with three playoff games. Brunskill reached Super Bowl LIV with the 49ers, but they lost 31–20 to the Kansas City Chiefs.

On March 20, 2020, Brunskill was re-signed to a one-year contract with the 49ers. During the 2020 season, he started all 16 games, playing a mix of positions on the offensive line.

The 49ers placed a one-year exclusive-rights free agent tender on Brunskill on March 12, 2021. He signed the contract on April 13. He was named the 49ers starting right guard for the 2021 season, starting all 17 regular season games. Brunskill played every offensive snap, including their run in the playoffs.

On March 15, 2022, the 49ers placed a restricted free agent tender on Brunskill, which he signed a month later. Brunskill played 14 games with two starts during the 2022 season, playing 58% of the season's offensive snaps while listed at both guard and center.

=== Tennessee Titans ===
On March 19, 2023, Brunskill signed a two-year, $5.5 million contract with the Tennessee Titans. He was named the Titans' right guard for the 2023 season, starting 14 games.

Brunskill continued playing with the Titans as a rotational lineman during the 2024 season. After Week 8, Brunskill became the Titans' primary center after recently signed Lloyd Cushenberry suffered a season-ending injury.

=== Miami Dolphins ===
On July 22, 2025, Brunskill signed with the Miami Dolphins.

=== Washington Commanders ===
On August 8, 2026, Brunskill signed with the Washington Commanders. On August 30, he was waived by the Commanders as a part of final roster cuts before the start of the regular season.

=== Los Angeles Chargers ===
On October 6, 2026, Brunskill signed with the Los Angeles Chargers practice squad. On November 19, he was released.
