= Nelson Spruce =

American football player (born 1992)

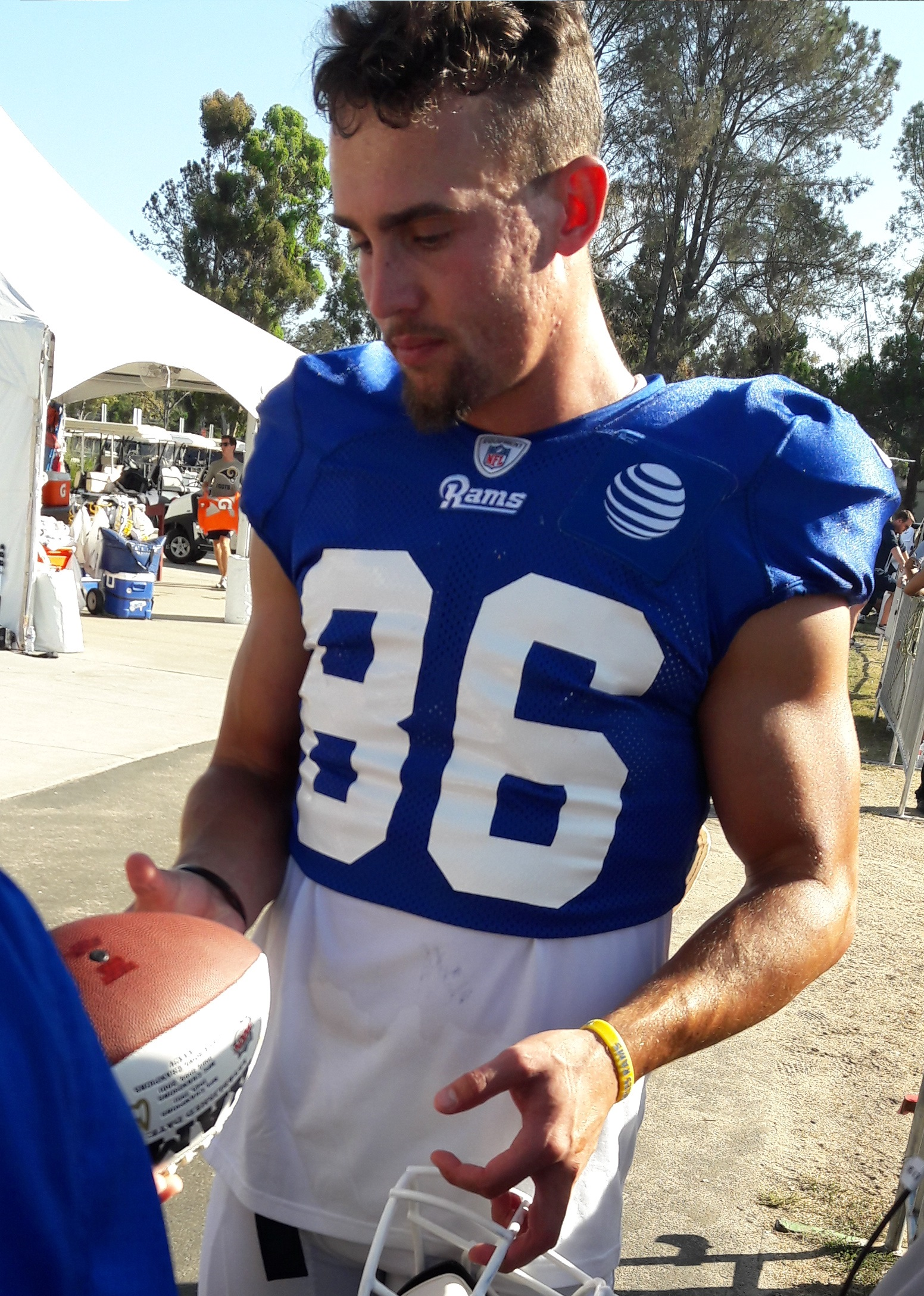
- Spruce with the Los Angeles Rams in 2017

No. 86, 5
- Position: Wide receiver

Personal information
- Born: December 5, 1992 (age 33); Westlake Village, California, U.S.
- Listed height: 6 ft 1 in (1.85 m)
- Listed weight: 210 lb (95 kg)

Career information
- High school: Westlake(Thousand Oaks, California)
- College: Colorado (2011–2015)
- NFL draft: 2016: undrafted

Career history
- Los Angeles Rams (2016); Chicago Bears (2017)*; Kansas City Chiefs (2018)*; Los Angeles Chargers (2018)*; San Diego Fleet (2019); Los Angeles Wildcats (2020); Montreal Alouettes (2021)*
- * Offseason or practice squad member only

Awards and highlights
- 2× Second-team All-Pac-12 (2014, 2015); Mid Season All-XFL (2020)
- Stats at Pro Football Reference

Nelson Gregory Spruce (born December 5, 1992) is an American former football wide receiver. He played college football for the Colorado Buffaloes.

== Early life ==
Spruce attended Westlake High School in Thousand Oaks, California. He was rated a three-star recruit by both Rivals.com and ESPN.com and committed to play college football for the Colorado Buffaloes

== College career ==
After redshirting his freshman season, Spruce led the Colorado Buffaloes in receptions (44) and receiving yards (446) his freshman season and proceeded to rack up 55 catches for 650 receiving yards his sophomore season. His breakthrough year came during his junior season in 2014 when he set 31 school records as well as a Pac-12 record for receptions in a game with 19 against California. As a senior in 2015, Spruce finished his college career by breaking the all-time Pac-12 receptions record in a game versus UCLA.

During his time at Colorado, Spruce set or tied 43 school or conference records.

== Professional career ==
Pre-draft measurables
Height	Weight	Arm length	Hand span	40-yard dash	10-yard split	20-yard split	20-yard shuttle	Three-cone drill	Vertical jump	Broad jump	Bench press
6 ft 1 1/8 in (1.86 m)	206 lb (93 kg)	30 in (0.76 m)	10 in (0.25 m)	4.58 s	1.63 s	2.67 s	4.20 s	7.09 s	35 in (0.89 m)	9 ft 6 in (2.90 m)	12 reps
All values from NFL Combine/Pro Day

=== Los Angeles Rams ===
After going undrafted in the 2016 NFL draft, Spruce signed as an undrafted free agent with the Los Angeles Rams The rookie made a big impression in his first preseason game, catching six passes for 51 yards and a touchdown to help the Rams defeat the Dallas Cowboys 28–24 in the team's first game back in Los Angeles after relocating from St. Louis. However, Spruce suffered a knee injury on the game-winning play and was out for the remainder of the preseason. Spruce made the Rams' regular season roster, but remained on the inactive list. After suffering an additional calf injury, Spruce was placed on injured reserve on November 18, 2016, ending his rookie season without making his regular season NFL debut.

Spruce stayed with the Rams through the offseason program, and caught six passes against Dallas in the preseason opener, but he saw little action in the following weeks as he had to compete for a roster spot with newly arrived receivers Robert Woods, Sammy Watkins, Cooper Kupp, and Josh Reynolds. On September 2, 2017, Spruce was waived/injured by the Rams and placed on injured reserve. He was released by the team following an injury settlement two days later.

=== Chicago Bears ===
On October 16, 2017, Spruce was signed to the Chicago Bears' practice squad.

=== Kansas City Chiefs ===
On March 30, 2018, Nelson was signed by the Kansas City Chiefs. He was waived on May 8, 2018.

=== Los Angeles Chargers ===
On May 14, 2018, Spruce signed with the Los Angeles Chargers. He was waived on September 1, 2018.

=== San Diego Fleet ===
On September 28, 2018, Spruce signed with the San Diego Fleet of the new Alliance of American Football. During the third week of the AAF season against the San Antonio Commanders, Spruce caught four passes for 50 yards and two touchdowns in a 31–11 victory. Spruce had a season high 12 catches for 146 yards in week seven against the Arizona Hotshots. The league ceased operations in April 2019. Spruce would finish fifth in the Alliance of American Football in receiving yards with 426 and second in receptions with 38.

=== Los Angeles Wildcats ===
Spruce was selected in the 3rd round in the 2020 XFL draft by the Los Angeles Wildcats. In his first XFL game, Spruce caught 11 passes for 103 yards. In Week 2, he had six catches for 89 yards and two touchdowns, including a 44-yard pass. By the time the 2020 XFL season was suspended due to the COVID-19 pandemic, Spruce had only played in the first three out of a possible five games, but had caught 20 passes for 256 yards and 2 scores, and was named to both the XFL mid-season awards list, and was one of the highest rated receivers according to Pro Football Focus. He had his contract terminated when the league suspended operations on April 10, 2020.

=== Montreal Alouettes ===
Spruce signed with the Montreal Alouettes of the CFL on January 22, 2021 but was released on July 17, 2021.
