= 2014 All-Pac-12 Conference football team =

The 2014 All-Pac-12 Conference football team consists of American football players chosen by various organizations for All-Pac-12 Conference teams for the 2014 Pac-12 Conference football season. The Oregon Ducks won the conference, defeating the Arizona Wildcats 51 to 13 in the Pac-12 Championship game. Oregon was then the national runner-up, in the College Football Playoff semifinal beating the ACC champion Florida States Seminoles 59 to 20; then losing to the Big Ten champion Ohio State Buckeyes 42 to 20 in the national championship game. Oregon quarterback Marcus Mariota won the Heisman Trophy and was voted Pac-12 Offensive Player of the Year. Arizona linebacker Scooby Wright III was voted Pat Tillman Pac-12 Defensive Player of the Year.

== Offensive selections ==
=== Quarterbacks ===
- Marcus Mariota, Oregon (Coaches-1)
- Brett Hundley, UCLA (Coaches-2)

=== Running backs ===
- Javorius Allen, USC (Coaches-1)
- Devontae Booker, Utah (Coaches-1)
- Royce Freeman, Oregon (Coaches-2)
- D. J. Foster, Arizona St. (Coaches-2)

=== Wide receivers ===
- Nelson Agholor, USC (Coaches-1)
- Jaelen Strong, Arizona St. (Coaches-1)
- Nelson Spruce, Colorado (Coaches-2)
- Vince Mayle, Washington St. (Coaches-2)

=== Tight ends ===
- Pharoah Brown, Oregon (Coaches-1)
- Austin Hooper, Stanford (Coaches-2)

=== Tackles ===
- Jake Fisher, Oregon (Coaches-1)
- Andrus Peat, Stanford (Coaches-1)
- Kyle Murphy, Stanford (Coaches-2)
- Jeremiah Poutasi, Utah (Coaches-2)

=== Guards ===
- Max Tuerk, USC (Coaches-1)
- Jamil Douglas, Arizona St. (Coaches-1)
- Steven Gurrola, Arizona (Coaches-2)
- Nick Kelly, Arizona St. (Coaches-2)

=== Centers ===
- Hroniss Grasu, Oregon (Coaches-1)
- Jake Brendel, UCLA (Coaches-2)

== Defensive selections ==
=== Ends ===
- Henry Anderson, Stanford (Coaches-1)
- Leonard Williams, USC (Coaches-1)
- Nate Orchard, Utah (Coaches-1)
- DeForest Buckner, Oregon (Coaches-2)
- Owa Odighizuwa, UCLA (Coaches-2)
- Dylan Wynn, Oregon St. (Coaches-2)

=== Tackles ===
- Danny Shelton, Washington (Coaches-1)
- Kenny Clark, UCLA (Coaches-2)

=== Linebackers ===
- Scooby Wright III, Arizona (Coaches-1)
- Hau'oli Kikaha, Washington (Coaches-1)
- Shaq Thompson, Washington (Coaches-1)
- Myles Jack, UCLA (Coaches-2)
- Eric Kendricks, UCLA (Coaches-2)
- A. J. Tarpley, Stanford (Coaches-2)

=== Cornerbacks ===
- Ifo Ekpre-Olomu, Oregon (Coaches-1)
- Ishmael Adams, UCLA (Coaches-1)
- Fabian Moreau, UCLA (Coaches-2)
- Steven Nelson, Oregon St. (Coaches-2)
- Troy Hill, Oregon (Coaches-2)

=== Safeties ===
- Su'a Cravens, USC (Coaches-1)
- Damarious Randall, Arizona St. (Coaches-1)
- Jordan Richards, Stanford (Coaches-1)
- Anthony Jefferson, UCLA (Coaches-1)
- Erick Dargan, Oregon (Coaches-2)

== Special teams ==
=== Placekickers ===
- Andy Phillips, Utah (Coaches-1)
- Zane Gonzalez, Arizona St. (Coaches-2)

=== Punters ===
- Tom Hackett, Utah (Coaches-1)
- Drew Riggleman, Arizona (Coaches-2)

=== Return specialists ===
- Kaelin Clay, Utah (Coaches-1)
- Ty Montgomery, Stanford (Coaches-2)

=== Special teams player ===
- Shaq Thompson, Washington (Coaches-1)
- Charles Nelson, Oregon (Coaches-2)
- JuJu Smith, USC (Coaches-2)

== Key ==
Coaches = selected by the Pac-12 coaches

== See also ==
- 2014 College Football All-America Team
