= Francis Owusu =

American football player (born 1994)

No. 82
- Position: Wide receiver

Personal information
- Born: December 27, 1994 (age 31); Oxnard, California, U.S.
- Listed height: 6 ft 3 in (1.91 m)
- Listed weight: 223 lb (101 kg)

Career information
- High school: Westlake Village (CA) Oaks Christian
- College: Stanford
- NFL draft: 2017: undrafted

Career history
- Miami Dolphins (2017; 2018)*; San Diego Fleet (2019)
- * Offseason or practice squad member only
- Stats at Pro Football Reference

Francis Taaloga Owusu (born December 27, 1994) is an American former professional football wide receiver. He played college football at Stanford.

== Early life ==
Owusu attended Oaks Christian high school in California, where he was a four star prospect ranked as the No. 27 player in California, he committed to Stanford over USC, Florida and Nebraska.

== College career ==
Owusu played as a true freshman, played in 12 games and had two receptions for 56 yards. In his senior year, Owusu played in 11 games and had eight receptions for 113 yards and a touchdown.

== Professional career ==
=== Miami Dolphins ===
Owusu signed with the Miami Dolphins as an undrafted free agent on May 5, 2017. He was waived/injured by the Dolphins on August 15, 2017. On August 18, 2017, he was released from injured reserve. On January 4, 2018, he signed a reserve/future contract with the Dolphins.

On September 1, 2018, Owusu was waived by the Dolphins. He was re-signed to the practice squad on November 28, 2018.

=== San Diego Fleet ===
On November 9, 2018, Owusu signed with the San Diego Fleet of the Alliance of American Football (AAF) for the 2019 season. The league ceased operations in April 2019.

== Personal life ==
Owusu has four siblings: Chris, Brian, Michael, and Crystal. Chris was a wide receiver at Stanford from 2008-2011 and is currently a free agent in the NFL. Brian was a defensive back at Harvard and graduated in 2013. Michael is a senior in high school at Oaks Christian School and has committed to play college football at Vanderbilt. His only sister, Crystal, played women's basketball at Columbia and graduated in 2015.
