= A. J. Tarpley =

American football player (born 1992)

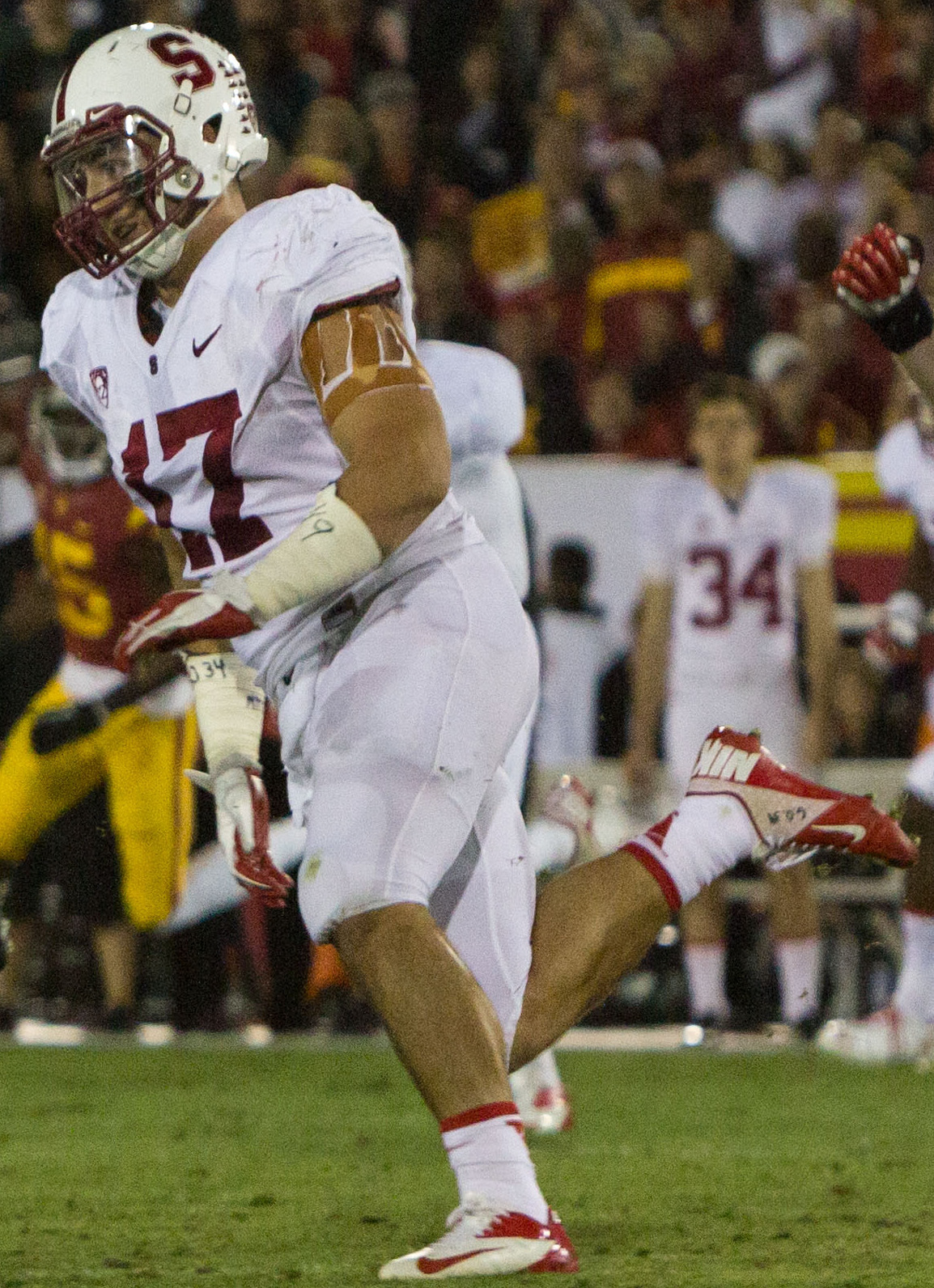
- Tarpley with Stanford in 2013

No. 59
- Position: Linebacker

Personal information
- Born: April 30, 1992 (age 34); Plymouth, Minnesota, U.S.
- Listed height: 6 ft 2 in (1.88 m)
- Listed weight: 225 lb (102 kg)

Career information
- High school: Wayzata (Plymouth)
- College: Stanford
- NFL draft: 2015: undrafted

Career history
- Buffalo Bills (2015); San Diego Fleet (2019); DC Defenders (2020)

Awards and highlights
- Second-team All-Pac-12 (2014)

Career NFL statistics
- Total tackles: 8
- Sacks: 1
- Forced fumbles: 1
- Pass deflections: 2
- Interceptions: 2
- Stats at Pro Football Reference

Aubrey Joseph Tarpley (born April 30, 1992) is an American former professional football player who was a linebacker for the Buffalo Bills of the National Football League (NFL). He played college football for the Stanford Cardinal. Tarpley was signed by Buffalo as an undrafted free agent in 2015. He played one season with the Bills before announcing his retirement at the age of 23, citing concern over concussions.

== College career ==
Tarpley started all four years for the Stanford Cardinal, compiling 20.5 career tackles for loss, 6.5 sacks, and four interceptions. He earned second-team All-Pac-12 honors as a senior.

== Professional career ==
=== Buffalo Bills ===
Tarpley was signed by the Buffalo Bills as an undrafted free agent following the 2015 NFL draft. On November 30, 2015, he was waived. On December 2, 2015, the Bills signed Tarpley to the practice squad, and on December 10, 2015, Tarpley was promoted to the active roster. Tarpley recorded his first career interception against the Dallas Cowboys on December 28, 2015. In Week 17 against the New York Jets on January 3, 2016, Tarpley made the game-ending interception that gave the Bills a 22–17 victory and knocked the Jets out of playoff contention. The interception turned out to be the final play of his career.

On April 6, 2016, Tarpley announced that he was retiring after just one season, citing his health, having suffered his third and fourth career concussions the previous season. He explained the decision in an essay submitted to Sports Illustrated.

=== Return to football ===
Less than three years after announcing his retirement, Tarpley returned to football in 2019 when he joined the San Diego Fleet of the Alliance of American Football.

In the third game of the 2019 AAF season against the San Antonio Commanders, Tarpley intercepted Logan Woodside and returned it 27 yards for a touchdown. He was subsequently named AAF Defensive Player of the Week. The league ceased operations in April 2019.

Tarpley later joined the XFL, where he was selected by the DC Defenders in the open phase of the 2020 XFL draft. He had his contract terminated when the league suspended operations on April 10, 2020.

== Personal life ==
During his initial retirement, Tarpley worked as a sales representative for Bank of America Merrill Lynch on Wall Street.
