= Terrell Watson =

American football player (born 1993)

No. 35, 39
- Position: Running back

Personal information
- Born: August 22, 1993 (age 33); Los Angeles, California, U.S.
- Listed height: 6 ft 1 in (1.85 m)
- Listed weight: 240 lb (109 kg)

Career information
- High school: Oxnard (Oxnard, California)
- College: Azusa Pacific (2011–2014)
- NFL draft: 2015: undrafted

Career history
- Cincinnati Bengals (2015)*; Cleveland Browns (2016)*; Denver Broncos (2016)*; Philadelphia Eagles (2016); Pittsburgh Steelers (2017); New York Giants (2018)*; Los Angeles Chargers (2018)*; San Diego Fleet (2019)
- * Offseason or practice squad member only

Awards and highlights
- NFLPA Collegiate Bowl MVP (2015)

Career NFL statistics
- Rushing attempts: 14
- Rushing yards: 36
- Rushing touchdowns: 1
- Receptions: 1
- Receiving yards: 5
- Stats at Pro Football Reference

Terrell Anthony Watson (born August 22, 1993) is an American former professional football player who was a running back in the National Football League (NFL). He played college football for the Azusa Pacific Cougars. He was signed by the Cincinnati Bengals as an undrafted free agent in 2015.

Watson was also a member of the Cleveland Browns, Denver Broncos, Philadelphia Eagles, Pittsburgh Steelers, New York Giants, Los Angeles Chargers, and San Diego Fleet.

== Early life ==
Watson was born in Los Angeles, California, on August 22, 1993, and was raised by his maternal grandparents Billy and Janice Watson, after his mother abandoned him. Watson's mother was 15 years old at the time.

Watson went on to star in football at Oxnard High School in Oxnard, California. In 2010, he led the entire CIF in rushing, finishing with 2,905 yards (along with 37 touchdowns) to rank sixth in the nation.

In 2016, Watson began to open up about his background, talking about his speech impediment, and bullying that occurred due to his lisp. He talked with a lisp, had an inability to read and found it difficult to understand simple concepts in elementary school, which caused him to be bullied, teased and looked down upon by fellow pupils. However, Watson overcame his early-life struggles, moving from remedial-level or special education classes to normal classes by late middle school, which he credited to his teachers who helped him.

Due to his educational background, he did not receive any FBS scholarship offers coming out of high school. However, Azusa Pacific, an NAIA program, would offer him a scholarship.

== College career ==
During his college career, Watson scored 79 touchdowns and rushed for nearly 6,000 yards for Azusa Pacific. He broke every rushing record at the school, which were previously held by former NFL player Christian Okoye. Watson ran for 2,212 yards and 29 touchdowns as a senior in the 2014 season. He went on to be named MVP of the January 2015 edition of the NFLPA Collegiate Bowl.

== Professional career ==
After completing his senior season, Watson declared for the NFL draft and received an invitation to the NFLPA Collegiate Bowl. On January 17, 2015, Watson had nine carries for 55 yards and a touchdown as the National team won the NFLPA Collegiate Bowl and defeated the American team 17-0. Watson and the National team were coached by former St. Louis Rams' head coach Mike Martz as Watson won the NFLPA Collegiate Bowl MVP award for his performance. Watson was not among the 35 collegiate running backs who received an invitation to the NFL Combine. On March 9, 2015, Watson participated at Azusa Pacific's pro day, along with five other teammates. He performed positional and combine drills for team representatives and scouts from 15 NFL teams. Running backs coaches from the Houston Texans, Cincinnati Bengals, and Arizona Cardinals attended Azusa’s pro day, with the Texans' coach primarily running his workout. Watson attended a pre-draft visit with the Bengals and received the most interest from them. At the conclusion of the pre-draft process, Watson was projected to be a seventh round pick or priority undrafted free agent by NFL draft experts and scouts. He was ranked as the 25th best running back in the draft by NFLDraftScout.com.

Pre-draft measurables
Height	Weight	40-yard dash	10-yard split	20-yard split	20-yard shuttle	Three-cone drill	Vertical jump	Broad jump	Bench press
6 ft 2 in (1.88 m)	240 lb (109 kg)	4.51 s	1.57 s	2.64 s	4.49 s	7.48 s	35 1/2 in (0.90 m)	10 ft 3 in (3.12 m)	22 reps
All values from Azusa Pacific's Pro Day

=== Cincinnati Bengals ===
On May 2, 2015, the Cincinnati Bengals signed Watson to a three-year, $1.58 million contract after he went undrafted in the 2015 NFL draft. Throughout training camp, Watson competed for a roster spot against BenJarvus Green-Ellis, Rex Burkhead, Cedric Peerman, and James Wilder Jr. On September 5, 2015, the Bengals waived Watson and signed him to their practice squad the following day, where he spent the entire 2015 season.

=== Cleveland Browns ===
On January 21, 2016, the Cleveland Browns signed Watson to a reserve/futures contract.

Throughout training camp, he competed for a roster spot against Glenn Winston, Raheem Mostert, Rajion Neal, and Jahwan Edwards. On September 4, 2016, he was waived by the Browns a day after making the initial 53-man roster and was signed to the practice squad the next day. He was released by the Browns on October 26, 2016.

=== Denver Broncos ===
On November 2, 2016, Watson was signed to the Denver Broncos' practice squad. He was released by the Broncos on December 14, 2016.

=== Philadelphia Eagles ===
On December 20, 2016, Watson was signed to the Philadelphia Eagles' practice squad. He was promoted to the active roster on December 30, 2016. He scored his first career touchdown on a one-yard run on January 1, 2017, in his NFL debut against the Dallas Cowboys. He totaled nine carries for 28 yards in the 27–13 victory. On May 4, 2017, he was released by the Eagles.

=== Pittsburgh Steelers ===
On May 18, 2017, Watson signed with the Pittsburgh Steelers. Watson agreed to a one-year, $465,000 contract.

Throughout training camp, Watson competed for a roster spot against Fitzgerald Toussaint, Knile Davis, and Trey Williams. He finished the 2017 preseason with 37 carries for 173 yards and one touchdown, as well as six receptions for 47 receiving yards. Head coach Mike Tomlin named Watson the third running back on the depth chart behind Le'Veon Bell and James Conner. He was assigned as the short yardage and third down back.

Watson made his regular season debut in the Steelers season-opening 21-18 victory over the Cleveland Browns. The following week, Watson had his first carry of the year for a one-yard gain during a 26–9 victory over the Minnesota Vikings. On November 25, 2017, the Steelers released Watson and was re-signed to the practice squad three days later. Overall, he had five carries for eight rushing yards to go along with seven kick returns for 140 net yards in the 2017 season.

=== New York Giants ===
On January 24, 2018, Watson signed a reserve/future contract with the New York Giants. He was waived by the Giants on May 7, 2018.

=== Los Angeles Chargers ===
On August 22, 2018, Watson was signed by the Los Angeles Chargers. He was waived on September 1, 2018.

=== San Diego Fleet ===
On September 28, 2018, Watson was signed by the San Diego Fleet. The league ceased operations in April 2019.
