= Jamil Douglas =

American football player (born 1992)

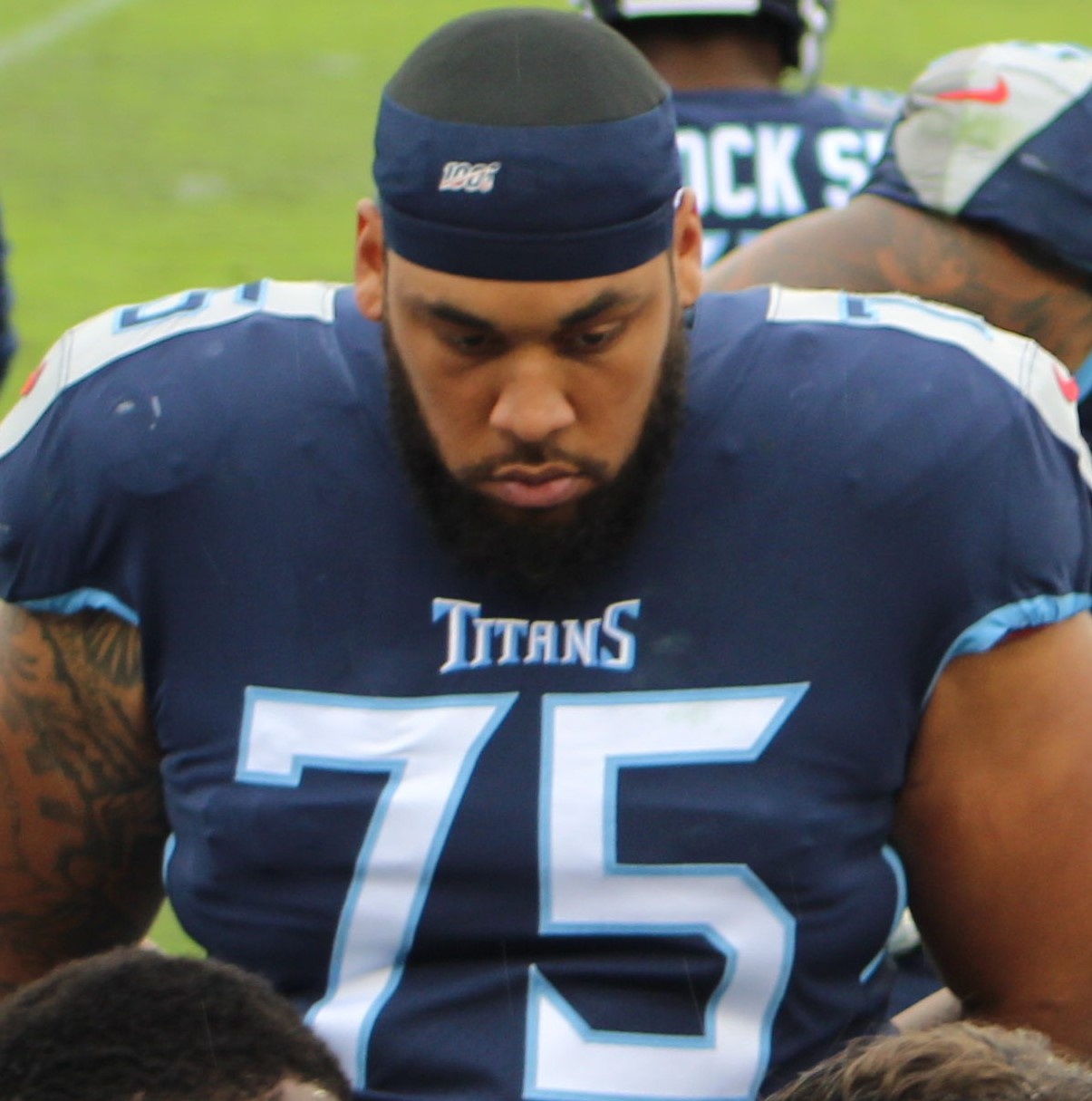
- Douglas with the Tennessee Titans in 2019

No. 75, 77, 64
- Position: Guard

Personal information
- Born: February 28, 1992 (age 34); Cypress, California, U.S.
- Listed height: 6 ft 4 in (1.93 m)
- Listed weight: 310 lb (141 kg)

Career information
- High school: Cypress
- College: Arizona State (2010–2014)
- NFL draft: 2015: 4th round, 114th overall pick

Career history
- Miami Dolphins (2015–2016); New England Patriots (2016–2017)*; Atlanta Falcons (2017); Indianapolis Colts (2018)*; Tennessee Titans (2018–2020); Buffalo Bills (2021); Washington Football Team (2021); New York Giants (2022)*
- * Offseason or practice squad member only

Awards and highlights
- Super Bowl champion (LI); First-team All-Pac-12 (2014); Second-team All-Pac-12 (2013)

Career NFL statistics
- Games played: 50
- Games started: 11
- Stats at Pro Football Reference

Jamil Douglas (/dʒəˈmɪl/ jə-MIL; born February 28, 1992) is an American former professional football player who was a guard in the National Football League (NFL). He played college football for the Arizona State Sun Devils. He played in the NFL with the Miami Dolphins, New England Patriots, Atlanta Falcons, Indianapolis Colts, Tennessee Titans, Buffalo Bills, Washington Football Team and New York Giants.

== College career ==
Douglas played college football for the Arizona State Sun Devils.

== Professional career ==
Pre-draft measurables
Height	Weight	Arm length	Hand span	Wingspan	40-yard dash	10-yard split	20-yard split	20-yard shuttle	Three-cone drill	Vertical jump	Broad jump	Bench press
6 ft 4 in (1.93 m)	304 lb (138 kg)	33 3/8 in (0.85 m)	10 3/4 in (0.27 m)	6 ft 7 5/8 in (2.02 m)	5.25 s	1.83 s	3.04 s	4.50 s	7.63 s	29.0 in (0.74 m)	8 ft 3 in (2.51 m)	28 reps
All values from NFL Combine/Pro Day

=== Miami Dolphins ===
Douglas was selected by the Miami Dolphins in the fourth round, 114th overall, of the 2015 NFL draft. He played in all 16 regular-season games as a rookie with six starts. On September 3, 2016, he was released by the Dolphins as part of final roster cuts and was signed to the practice squad the next day. He was promoted to the active roster on September 29, but released the following day and re-signed to the practice squad. He was released on October 13.

=== New England Patriots ===
On October 18, 2016, Douglas was signed to the New England Patriots' practice squad. On February 5, 2017, the Patriots appeared in Super Bowl LI where they defeated the Atlanta Falcons by a score of 34–28 in overtime.

On February 7, 2017, Douglas signed a futures contract with the Patriots. He was waived on September 2.

=== Atlanta Falcons ===
On September 5, 2017, Douglas was signed to the Atlanta Falcons' practice squad. He was promoted to the active roster on December 29.

On September 1, 2018, Douglas was waived by the Falcons.

=== Indianapolis Colts ===
On September 3, 2018, Douglas was signed to the Indianapolis Colts' practice squad. He was released on September 10.

=== Tennessee Titans ===
On October 3, 2018, Douglas was signed to the Tennessee Titans' practice squad. He signed a reserve/future contract with the Titans on December 31.

Douglas started the first four games of the 2019 season at right guard. He would finish the season playing in 15 games, starting five.

=== Buffalo Bills ===
Douglas signed a one-year contract with the Buffalo Bills on April 2, 2021. He was released on August 31 and re-signed to the practice squad the following day. He was promoted to the active roster on November 6. Douglas was waived on December 11.

=== Washington Football Team ===
On December 13, 2021, Douglas was claimed off waivers by the Washington Football Team.

=== New York Giants ===
On March 18, 2022, Douglas signed with the New York Giants. He was released on August 30.
