= AAF quarterback draft =

Professional American football draft

AAF QB draft

General information
- Date: November 27, 2018
- Location: HyperX Esports Arena; Luxor Las Vegas; Las Vegas, Nevada
- Network: CBS Sports Network

Overview
- 32 total selections
- League: AAF
- First selection: Josh Johnson; San Diego Fleet

The AAF QB draft was the only draft for the Alliance of American Football (AAF), held in advance of the 2019 season. The draft was a four-round quarterback draft where clubs were allowed to "protect or pick" from the selection. It was held on November 27, 2018, at the HyperX Esports Arena at Luxor Las Vegas and broadcast on the CBS Sports Network.

== Draft rules ==
The draft lasted four rounds with a preset draft order. The first round included a "pick or protect" method, where if a team elected to protect a player, they selected their player before the teams electing to not protect a player from their region. The second round kept the original selection order with the third and fourth rounds being the reverse order selection.

=== "Protect or pick" rules ===
Quarterbacks were allocated by region based on where they played college football or last played with an NFL or CFL team. If the player went to school outside of an Alliance team's area, the player was unallocated and eligible for selection by any team. Teams were given the option to "protect" any player from their area, and would become that team's first round selection. Teams electing not to "protect" a player would then "pick" from the entire pool of eligible quarterbacks based on draft order for their first round selection. Any quarterback that was already signed to an Alliance team was eligible to be selected in the draft.

== Player selections ==
Rnd.	Pick #	AAF team	Player	College	Most recent pro team roster	Notes
1	1	San Diego Fleet	Josh Johnson	San Diego	Oakland Raiders	Protected
1	2	Atlanta Legends	Aaron Murray	Georgia	Los Angeles Rams	Protected
1	3	Memphis Express	Troy Cook	UT Martin		Protected
1	4	San Antonio Commanders	Dustin Vaughan	West Texas A&M	Baltimore Ravens	Protected
1	5	Birmingham Iron	Luis Perez	Texas A&M–Commerce	Los Angeles Rams	
1	6	Arizona Hotshots	Trevor Knight	Texas A&M	Atlanta Falcons	
1	7	Orlando Apollos	Garrett Gilbert	SMU	Carolina Panthers	
1	8	Salt Lake Stallions	Josh Woodrum	Liberty	Baltimore Ravens	
2	9	San Diego Fleet	Mike Bercovici	Arizona State	Arizona Cardinals	
2	10	Birmingham Iron	Blake Sims	Alabama	Tampa Bay Buccaneers	
2	11	Arizona Hotshots	John Wolford	Wake Forest	New York Jets	
2	12	Orlando Apollos	Stephen Morris	Miami (FL)	Houston Texans	
2	13	Atlanta Legends	Matt Simms	Tennessee	Atlanta Falcons	
2	14	Salt Lake Stallions	B. J. Daniels	South Florida	Saskatchewan Roughriders	
2	15	Memphis Express	Christian Hackenberg	Penn State	Cincinnati Bengals	
2	16	San Antonio Commanders	Marquise Williams	North Carolina	Saskatchewan Roughriders	
3	17	San Antonio Commanders	Logan Woodside	Toledo	Tennessee Titans	
3	18	Memphis Express	Brandon Silvers	Troy		
3	19	Salt Lake Stallions	Austin Allen	Arkansas	Tampa Bay Buccaneers	
3	20	Atlanta Legends	Peter Pujals	Holy Cross	Minnesota Vikings	
3	21	Orlando Apollos	Austin Appleby	Florida	Dallas Cowboys	
3	22	Arizona Hotshots	Quinn McQueary	Montana Tech		
3	23	Birmingham Iron	Scott Tolzien	Wisconsin	Indianapolis Colts	
3	24	San Diego Fleet	Philip Nelson	East Carolina	Winnipeg Blue Bombers	
4	25	San Antonio Commanders	Dalton Sturm	UTSA	Dallas Cowboys	
4	26	Memphis Express	Zach Mettenberger	LSU	Pittsburgh Steelers	
4	27	Salt Lake Stallions	Matt Linehan	Idaho		
4	28	Atlanta Legends	Justin Holman	UCF	Montreal Alouettes	
4	29	Orlando Apollos	Kevin Anderson	Fordham		
4	30	Arizona Hotshots	Jack Heneghan	Dartmouth	San Francisco 49ers	
4	31	Birmingham Iron	Alek Torgersen	Penn	Arizona Cardinals	
4	32	San Diego Fleet	Alex Ross	Coastal Carolina	Winnipeg Blue Bombers	
