= Ron Brooks =

American football player (born 1988)

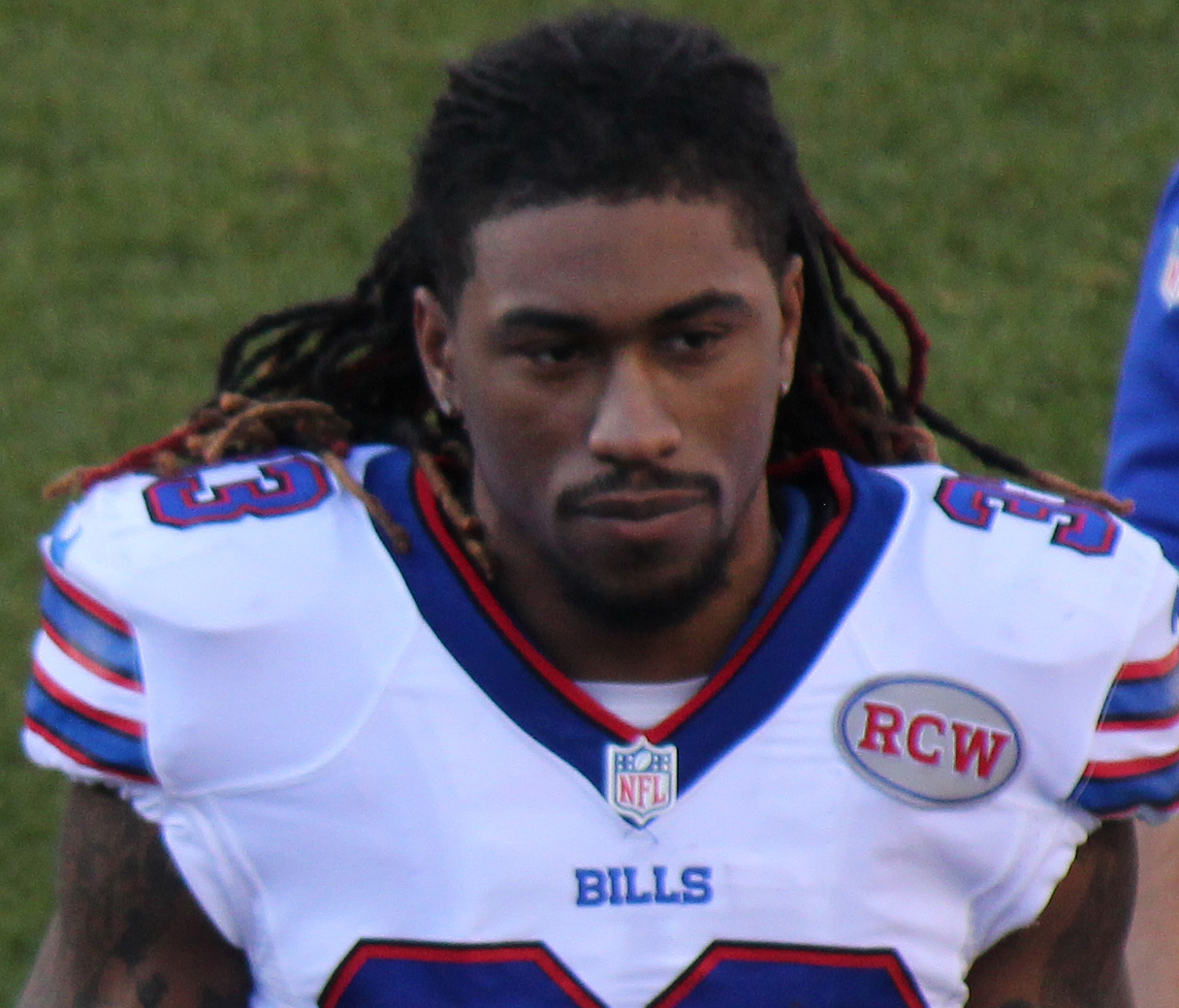
- Brooks with the Buffalo Bills in 2014

No. 33
- Position: Cornerback

Personal information
- Born: October 16, 1988 (age 38); Dallas, Texas, U.S.
- Listed height: 5 ft 10 in (1.78 m)
- Listed weight: 190 lb (86 kg)

Career information
- High school: MacArthur (Irving, Texas)
- College: LSU
- NFL draft: 2012: 4th round, 124th overall pick

Career history
- Buffalo Bills (2012–2015); Philadelphia Eagles (2016); San Diego Fleet (2019)

Career NFL statistics
- Total tackles: 90
- Fumble recoveries: 1
- Pass deflections: 8
- Stats at Pro Football Reference

Ron Brooks (born October 16, 1988) is an American former professional football player who was a cornerback in the National Football League (NFL). He was selected by the Buffalo Bills in fourth round of the 2012 NFL draft. He played college football for the LSU Tigers. He also played for the Philadelphia Eagles and San Diego Fleet.

== Early life ==
A native of Irving, Texas, Brooks attended MacArthur High School, where he was a decorated dual-threat quarterback. As a senior, he rushed for 1,264 yards and 19 touchdowns, and also threw for 882 yards and nine touchdowns while being named the District 7-5A MVP. He was selected to the 2007 U.S. Army All-American Bowl in San Antonio, Texas.

Brooks was a four-star recruit as an athlete coming out of high school by Rivals.com. He chose Louisiana State University over offers from Arkansas, Texas Tech, and Texas A&M.

== College career ==
Appearing in 53 games, he accumulated 90 tackles, including 12.5 for loss, 5.5 sacks, ten pass breakups, three interceptions, and forced five fumbles while recovering three. He started in three games in his career at LSU, playing behind Patrick Peterson, Morris Claiborne, and Tyrann Mathieu.

== Professional career ==
Pre-draft measurables
| Height | Weight | 40-yard dash | 10-yard split | 20-yard split | Vertical jump | Broad jump |
|---|---|---|---|---|---|---|
| 5 ft 10 in (1.78 m) | 190 lb (86 kg) | 4.37 s | 1.55 s | 2.52 s | 38 in (0.97 m) | 10 ft 0 in (3.05 m) |
All values from 2013 NFL Combine

=== Buffalo Bills ===
==== 2012 season ====
Brooks was selected by the Buffalo Bills in the fourth round, 124th overall, of the 2012 NFL draft. The Bills previously traded Lee Evans to the Baltimore Ravens to acquire the pick used to select Brooks.

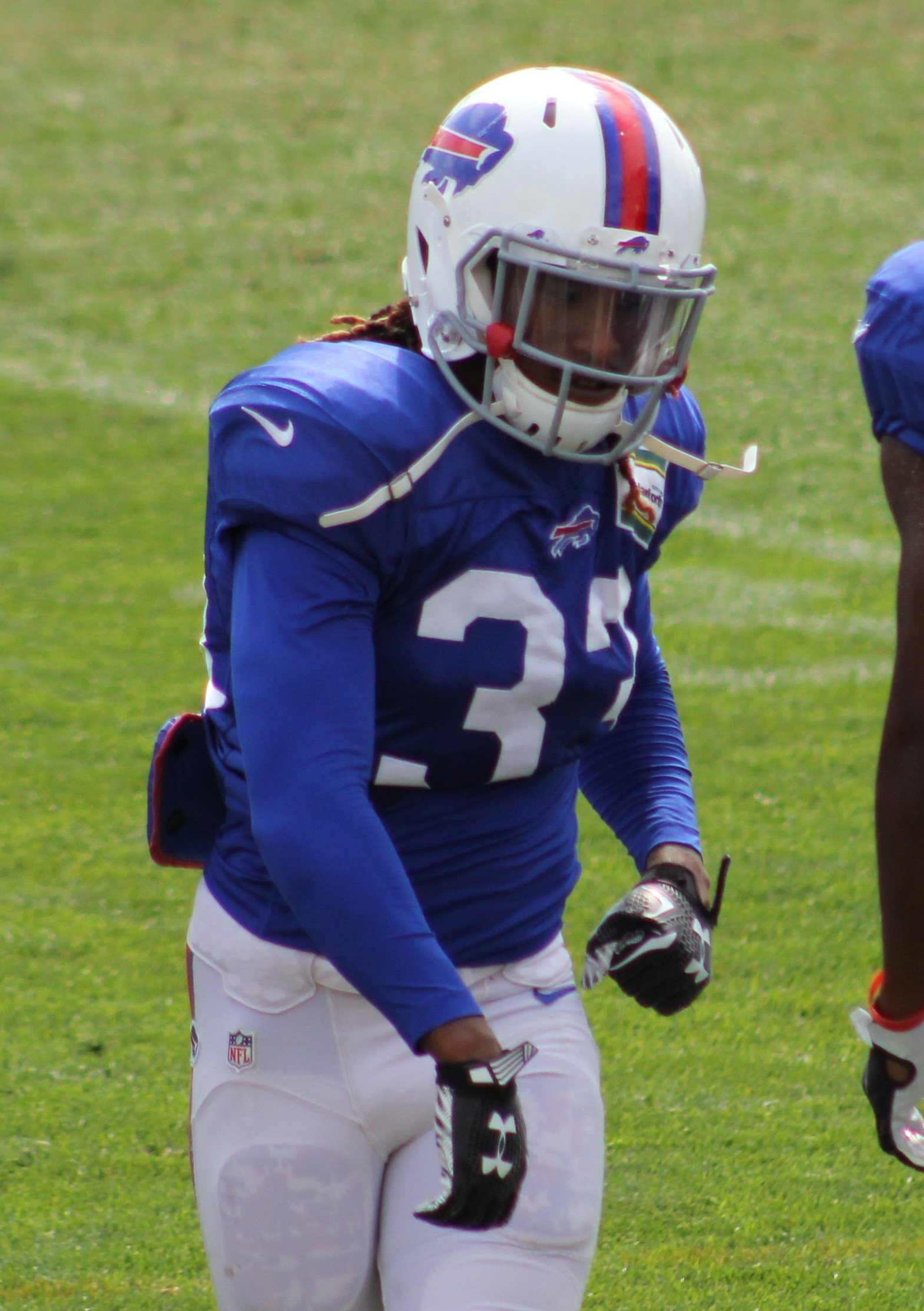
Brooks dancing during camp in 2015

In his rookie season, he missed the first seven games due to a broken bone in his foot he sustained in the final pre-season game against the Detroit Lions. He was placed on injured reserve with the "designated to return" label. He returned in Week 9 against the Houston Texans, and went on to play in nine games, starting in two of them, and finished his rookie season with 19 tackles and four passes defended.

On December 2, 2012, Brooks made his first career NFL start and led the Bills with a season high nine tackles and three passes defensed against the Jacksonville Jaguars.

==== 2013 season ====
Brooks spent his 2013 season mostly on special teams, recording only 7 tackles on the season.

==== 2014 season ====
On December 2, 2014, making his only start of the season, Brooks led the Bills with a season high eight tackles and a pass defended against the New England Patriots.

==== 2015 season ====
On December 30, 2015, Brooks was placed on injured reserve.

=== Philadelphia Eagles ===
On March 9, 2016, Brooks signed a three-year deal with the Philadelphia Eagles, reuniting him with former Bills defensive coordinator Jim Schwartz. In Week 7 against the Minnesota Vikings, Brooks ruptured his right quadriceps tendon, keeping him out for the rest of the season.

On August 30, 2017, Brooks was released by the Eagles.

=== San Diego Fleet ===
In 2019, Brooks joined the San Diego Fleet of the Alliance of American Football. In the season opener against the San Antonio Commanders, Brooks intercepted quarterback Logan Woodside in the end zone. In 8 games prior to the league suspending operations, Brooks also made 13 tackles, and defended 5 passes, while also contributing as a returner on special teams, including a 56 yard punt return for a touchdown in week 4. The league ceased operations in April 2019.
