= Jeremiah Kolone =

American football player and coach (born 1994)

Green Bay Packers
- Title: Offensive assistant

Personal information
- Born: October 23, 1994 (age 32); Pago Pago, American Samoa
- Listed height: 6 ft 3 in (1.91 m)
- Listed weight: 316 lb (143 kg)

Career information
- Position: Guard (No. 60, 62)
- High school: Fallbrook (Fallbrook, California, U.S.)
- College: San Jose State
- NFL draft: 2018: undrafted

Career history

Playing
- Los Angeles Rams (2018)*; San Diego Fleet (2019); Los Angeles Rams (2019–2022)
- * Offseason or practice squad member only

Coaching
- Arizona (2024) Graduate assistant; Green Bay Packers (2025–present) Offensive assistant

Awards and highlights
- Super Bowl champion (LVI)

Career NFL statistics
- Games played: 5
- Games started: 2
- Stats at Pro Football Reference

Jeremiah Suevale Kolone (born October 23, 1994) is an American football coach and former offensive guard who is an offensive assistant for the Green Bay Packers of the National Football League (NFL). He played college football for the San Jose State Spartans and later professionally for the NFL's Los Angeles Rams and for the San Diego Fleet of the Alliance of American Football (AAF).

== Early life and education ==
Kolone was born on October 23, 1994, in Pago Pago, American Samoa. His family moved to Hawaii in 1998, and later to San Diego, California. He attended Fallbrook Union High School in Fallbrook, California, and played each offensive line position for their football team as well as defensive tackle. He was a three-time All-Avocado East League selection and was twice honored with a first-team All-North County selection. He committed to San Jose State.

In his first season at San Jose State (2013), Kolone redshirted. As a freshman in 2014, he appeared in 10 out of 12 games and started each game in which he appeared, only missing games against Colorado State and Fresno State due to injury. Kolone earned honorable mention All-Mountain West Conference honors in 2015, after starting all 13 games, being one of only four sophomores to accomplish that feat in the season. He was part of the offensive line which blocked for over 2,000 rushing yards and 2,000 passing yards during the regular season.

Kolone was an honorable mention all-conference pick for the second consecutive year in 2016, after being San Jose State's only offensive player to start all 12 games. He started 10 at left guard and two at center (against Iowa State and New Mexico). Kolone was named team captain as a senior, and started seven games (six at left guard and one at center) before suffering a season-ending injury.

Kolone finished his five-year career with San Jose State with 42 games played, all as a starter. He had a period with 36 consecutive games started and was twice named honorable mention all-conference. He was a four-year starter at left guard but also saw playing time as center throughout his time with the Spartans.

== Professional career ==
Pre-draft measurables
Height	Weight	Arm length	Hand span	Wingspan	40-yard dash	10-yard split	20-yard split
6 ft 2 3/8 in (1.89 m)	304 lb (138 kg)	33 1/4 in (0.84 m)	9 1/4 in (0.23 m)	6 ft 5 1/8 in (1.96 m)	5.31 s	1.84 s	3.00 s
All values from Pro Day

=== Los Angeles Rams ===
After going unselected in the 2018 NFL draft, Kolone was signed by the Los Angeles Rams as an undrafted free agent. He was released at the final roster cuts, on August 31. Kolone was re-signed to the practice squad on September 2, but was released on September 11.

=== San Diego Fleet ===
In spring 2019, Kolone was signed by the San Diego Fleet of the newly formed Alliance of American Football (AAF), appearing in seven games as the team's starting center before the league folded.

=== Los Angeles Rams (second stint) ===
On April 29, 2019, Kolone was signed again by the Los Angeles Rams. He was released at the final roster cuts, on August 31, but was re-signed to the practice squad the following day. He was signed to a future contract on December 31. He was released on September 4, 2020. On September 24, Kolone was signed to the Rams' practice squad, only to be released on December 8.

On August 4, 2021, Kolone was signed again by the Los Angeles Rams. He was waived on August 30, but re-signed to the practice squad on September 1. He was activated from the practice squad on December 13, for their game against the Arizona Cardinals, and reverted back afterwards. While on the practice squad, the Rams defeated the Cincinnati Bengals 23–20 in Super Bowl LVI. Kolone was signed to a reserve/futures contract on February 15, 2022. He was released on August 30, and re-signed to the practice squad shortly afterwards. He was signed to the active roster on September 14, and made his NFL debut in the Rams' 31–27 win over the Atlanta Falcons, appearing on five special teams snaps. He was waived on October 25, 2022. He was re-signed to the practice squad the next day. His practice squad contract expired when the team's season ended on January 9, 2023.

== Coaching career ==
Kolone joined the Arizona Wildcats as a graduate assistant in 2024. In 2025, he joined head coach Scott Frost's staff at UCF to become an offensive analyst.

On April 3, 2025, it was announced that Kolone had joined the Green Bay Packers as an offensive assistant.
