= George Winslow (American football) =

American football player (born 1963)

No. 5, 9
- Position: Punter

Personal information
- Born: July 28, 1963 (age 63); Philadelphia, Pennsylvania, U.S.
- Listed height: 6 ft 4 in (1.93 m)
- Listed weight: 205 lb (93 kg)

Career information
- High school: La Salle College (Wyndmoor, Pennsylvania)
- College: Wisconsin; Villanova
- NFL draft: 1987: undrafted

Career history
- Cleveland Browns (1987); Buffalo Bills (1988)*; New Orleans Saints (1989)
- * Offseason or practice squad member only

Career NFL statistics
- Punts: 34
- Punting yards: 1,211
- Longest punt: 50
- Stats at Pro Football Reference

George Winslow (born July 28, 1963) is an American former professional football player who was a punter in the National Football League (NFL). He played college football for the Wisconsin Badgers and Villanova Wildcats. In 1987, Winslow was signed as a free agent. He first played with the Cleveland Browns during the 1987 NFL season, but was released during the 1987 season. Buffalo signed Winslow in 1988, but released him in August 1988 during pre-season. After a year away from the NFL, he played with the New Orleans Saints during the 1989 NFL season. The Saints released Winslow in October 1989. In November 1989, he had a tryout with the Eagles, but was not signed.

Winslow was voted All-Decade Team and All-Catholic Team for his time at La Salle High School. While in college, one coach stated "The kid had one kick that hung up there for 6.2 seconds."

George's son Ryan Winslow has played in the NFL as a punter as well.
