= Sam Irwin-Hill =

Australian gridiron football player (born 1990)

No. 2
- Position: Punter

Personal information
- Born: 10 October 1990 (age 36); Bendigo, Australia
- Listed height: 6 ft 2 in (1.88 m)
- Listed weight: 203 lb (92 kg)

Career information
- College: Arkansas
- NFL draft: 2015: undrafted

Career history
- Dallas Cowboys (2017)*; Washington Redskins (2018)*; San Diego Fleet (2019); Atlanta Falcons (2019–2020)*
- * Offseason or practice squad member only
- Stats at Pro Football Reference

Sam Irwin-Hill (born 10 October 1990) is an Australian former American football punter. He played college football at the University of Arkansas.

== Early life ==
Irwin-Hill, attended high school at Bendigo, Australia, where he practiced Australian rules football. He played junior football at Eaglehawk Football Club and also played for the Bendigo Pioneers in the TAC Cup under 18s competition. He started learning American football in an Academy called PROKICK Australia and one of his teammates was Tom Hornsey.

== College career ==
Irwin-Hill accepted a football scholarship from the City College of San Francisco. As a freshman, he was the team's punter, averaging 40.6 yards per punt, while helping the Rams win the CCCAA state title with a perfect 12-0 record.

Being an ambidextrous punter, he could kick with either leg. As a sophomore, he punted 44 attempts for an average of 41.7 yards per punt, including a long of 77 yards and downed 15 punts inside the 20-yard line. He helped the team advance to the CCCAA championship game, finishing the year with a 10-2 mark. He received first-team Junior college All-American honors.

He transferred to the University of Arkansas after his sophomore season in 2013. As a junior, he appeared in 12 games, averaging 44.3 yards (third in the conference) in 46 punt attempts. He led the SEC with 20 punts inside the opponent's 20-yard line.

As a senior, he appeared in 13 games, averaging 40.1 yards in 58 punt attempts and dropped 27 punts inside the opponent's 20-yard line. He rushed twice for 74 yards, including a 51-yard touchdown run against Texas A&M. He finished his collegiate career with a total of 4,365 yards on 104 punt attempts.

== Professional career ==
=== Dallas Cowboys ===
On 17 April, 2017, Irwin-Hill was signed as a free agent by the Dallas Cowboys, where he was tried at both placekicker and punter. He had previously attended minicamp on a tryout basis with the Indianapolis Colts in 2015 and 2016.

In the Pro Football Hall of Fame Game against the Arizona Cardinals, he handled both punting and kicking duties. He was waived on 1 September 2017.

=== Washington Commanders ===
On 16 March, 2018, Irwin-Hill signed with the Washington Commanders, but he was waived on 11 July.

=== San Diego Fleet ===
On 26 October 2018, Irwin-Hill signed with the San Diego Fleet. He suffered an injury before the start of the 2019 season and was placed on the roster exempt list on 30 January. After missing the season opener due to travel visa issues, he was activated on 12 February. The league ceased operations in April 2019.

=== Atlanta Falcons ===
On October 8, 2019, Irwin-Hill was signed to the Atlanta Falcons practice squad, but was released three days later following an issue with his travel visa.

On February 7, 2020, Irwin-Hill was signed by the Atlanta Falcons. On April 25, 2020, Irwin-Hill was released by the Falcons.
