= San Diego Fleet =

Professional American football franchise

Logo

General information
- Founded: 2018
- Folded: 2019
- Colors: Battleship Gray, Gray, Yellow, White

Personnel
- Head coach: Mike Martz
- President: Jeff Garner

Team history
- San Diego Fleet (2019)

Home fields
- SDCCU Stadium (2019)

League / conference affiliations
- Alliance of American Football: Western Conference (2019)

The San Diego Fleet were a professional American football team based in San Diego, California, that competed in the Alliance of American Football (AAF). The league began play in February 2019, with the team playing its home games at SDCCU Stadium. They were coached by former NFL head coach Mike Martz. The team was one of the two professional football teams playing in San Diego, along with the San Diego Strike Force of the Indoor Football League, and the first since the San Diego Chargers moved to Los Angeles in 2017.

In April 2019, the league suspended football operations and allowed players to break their contracts. On April 17, the league filed for bankruptcy, cutting the season short and putting all eight teams out of business, since under the AAF organizational plan all teams were funded by the central organization.

== History ==
The Alliance San Diego team and head coach, Mike Martz, was announced by the Alliance of American Football on May 29, 2018. Early reports had Rick Neuheisel coaching the team before he instead agreed to take the coaching job in Phoenix. Alliance San Diego's name, logo and colors were revealed on September 25, 2018, as the San Diego Fleet (battleship gray, yellow and silver gray) along with the other three western teams. The name indicates the city's ties to the United States Navy.

The team pays $25,000 per game in rent to use SDCCU Stadium and covers an additional $160,000 per game in other game-related expenses the city incurs.

The Fleet held the first-overall pick in the league's 2019 AAF QB Draft, which was used to protect Josh Johnson. Johnson, who signed with the NFL's Washington Redskins before the end of the 2018 season, never played for the Fleet. The final 52-man roster was set on January 30.

Dre Bly, who had played cornerback for Martz with the St. Louis Rams, was originally slated to coach defensive backs, but stepped down to take a similar position at the University of North Carolina. Former NFL quarterback Jon Kitna was also announced as the team's offensive coordinator in June 2018. However, he did not coach a game for the Fleet as he was hired by the Dallas Cowboys in January 2019 to become their quarterbacks coach.

The team's first game was a loss at the Alamodome against the San Antonio Commanders on Saturday, February 9, 2019, with the game broadcast live on CBS. The Fleet won its first three home games before enthusiastic crowds and was third in attendance among the eight-team league.

On April 2, 2019, the Alliance for American Football suspended football operations, and on April 4 the league allowed players to leave their contracts to sign with NFL teams. The effect was to cancel the final two regular season games and the scheduled post-season playoffs. The Fleet athletes and coaches, who were in Orlando getting ready for a game against the Orlando Apollos, suddenly "found themselves paying their own hotel bills and buying their own plane tickets home."

The league filed for Chapter 7 bankruptcy on April 17, 2019. The Fleet's final record for the abbreviated season was 3-5.

== Final roster ==
2019 San Diego Fleet final roster
Quarterbacks: 11 Mike Bercovici; 4 Alex Ross; 8 Alek Torgersen; Running backs: 31 Paul James; 20 Bishop Sankey; 39 Terrell Watson; Wide receivers: 83 Brian Brown; 16 Shay Fields; 10 Laquvionte Gonzalez; 80 Kyle Lewis; 82 Francis Owusu; 81 Nelson Spruce; Tight ends: 85 Marcus Baugh; 89 Gavin Escobar; 88 Ben Johnson	Offensive linemen: 69 Brett Boyko T; 75 Daniel Brunskill T; 74 Chris Gonzalez G/C; 72 Darrell Greene G; 62 Jeremiah Kolone C; 68 Gerard Kough T; 71 Damien Mama G; 67 Beau Nunn G; 79 Terry Poole T; Defensive linemen: 93 Alex Barrett DE; 97 Meffy Koloamatangi DE; 94 Damontre Moore DE; 91 Myles Nash DE; 98 Gelen Robinson DT; 92 Shakir Soto DT; 99 Andrew Stelter DT; 90 Tani Tupou DT	Linebackers: 41 Travis Feeney OLB; 58 Frank Ginda MLB; 53 John Lotulelei OLB; 51 Kenneth Olugbode OLB; 42 Eric Pinkins OLB; 59 A. J. Tarpley MLB; Defensive backs: 33 Ron Brooks CB; 36 Xavier Coleman CB; 26 Greg Ducre CB; 37 Kendall James CB; 24 Kameron Kelly CB; 22 Jordan Martin FS; 28 Curtis Mikell CB; 25 Ryan Moeller SS; 27 Damarius Travis SS; 34 Demetrius Wright FS; Special teams: 49 Ryan DiSalvo LS; 1 Donny Hageman K; 2 Sam Irwin-Hill P	Reserve lists: 21 Jude Adjei-Barimah CB (IR); 18 Isaiah Burse WR (IR); 89 Wayne Capers Jr. WR (IR); 12 Dontez Ford WR (IR); 32 Ja'Quan Gardner RB (IR); 60 John Montelus G (IR); 9 Philip Nelson QB (IR); Rights list: 46 Darryl Richardson TE; 51 Active, 8 Inactive

=== Allocation pool ===
The team's assigned area, which designates player rights, includes the following:

Colleges

- Arkansas
- Azusa Pacific
- Cal Poly
- Colorado
- Fresno State
- Hawaii
- Humboldt State
- Sacramento State
- San Diego
- San Diego State
- San Jose State
- Stanford
- UC Davis
- UNLV
- USC
- Washington

National Football League (NFL)

- Detroit Lions
- Los Angeles Chargers
- Los Angeles Rams
- Oakland Raiders

Canadian Football League (CFL)

- BC Lions

== Staff ==
San Diego Fleet staff
Front office: President – Jeff Garner; General manager – Dave Boller; Head coaches: Head coach – Mike Martz; Offensive coaches: Offensive coordinator – Mike DeBord; Running backs – LaMont Jordan; Wide receivers – Az-Zahir Hakim; Tight ends – Anthony Becht; Assistant offensive line – Matt Kitna	Defensive coaches: Defensive coordinator – Larry Marmie; Defensive line – Vince Amey; Defensive backs – Eric Allen; Special teams coaches: Special teams/Linebackers – Larry Mac Duff

== 2019 season ==
2019 San Diego Fleet season
- General manager: Dave Boller
- Head coach: Mike Martz
- Home stadium: SDCCU Stadium

Results
- Record: 3–5
- League place: 3rd (tie), Western Conference

=== Final standings ===
2019 Alliance of American Football standings
Eastern Conference
Club	W–L	PCT	CONF	PF	PA	DIFF	SOS	SOV	STK
Orlando Apollos	7–1	.875	5–0	236	136	100	.406	.375	W2
Birmingham Iron	5–3	.625	3–2	165	133	32	.406	.300	W1
Memphis Express	2–6	.250	1–4	152	194	-42	.578	.500	L1
Atlanta Legends	2–6	.250	1–4	88	213	-125	.609	.438	L3
Western Conference
Club	W–L	PCT	CONF	PF	PA	DIFF	SOS	SOV	STK
San Antonio Commanders	5–3	.625	3–2	158	154	4	.516	.450	L1
Arizona Hotshots	5–3	.625	3–2	186	144	42	.469	.500	W3
San Diego Fleet	3–5	.375	2–3	158	161	-3	.469	.417	L3
Salt Lake Stallions	3–5	.375	2–3	135	143	-8	.547	.417	W1

=== Schedule ===
==== Preseason ====
Date	Opponent	Result	Record	Venue
January 27	Orlando Apollos	L 28–31	0–1	Alamodome

==== Regular season ====
Week	Date	Opponent	Result	Record	Venue	Attendance
1	February 9	at San Antonio Commanders	L 6–15	0–1	Alamodome	27,857
2	February 17	Atlanta Legends	W 24–12	1–1	SDCCU Stadium	20,019
3	February 24	San Antonio Commanders	W 31–11	2–1	SDCCU Stadium	14,789
4	March 2	at Memphis Express	L 23–26	2–2	Liberty Bowl Memorial Stadium	13,621
5	March 9	Salt Lake Stallions	W 27–25	3–2	SDCCU Stadium	20,823
6	March 17	Birmingham Iron	L 29–32	3–3	SDCCU Stadium	20,986
7	March 24	at Arizona Hotshots	L 15–32	3–4	Sun Devil Stadium	9,760
8	March 30	at Salt Lake Stallions	L 3–8	3–5	Rice–Eccles Stadium	8,405
9	April 6	at Orlando Apollos	Not played		Spectrum Stadium	
10	April 14	Arizona Hotshots	Not played		SDCCU Stadium	

=== Game summaries ===
==== Week 1: at San Antonio ====
Week 1: San Diego Fleet at San Antonio Commanders – Game summary

Quarter	1	2	3	4	Total
Fleet	0	6	0	0	6
Commanders	0	6	0	9	15

at Alamodome, San Antonio, Texas

- Date: February 9
- Game time: 5:00 p.m. PT
- Game weather: Indoors
- Game attendance: 27,857
- Referee: Jeff Heaser
- TV announcers (CBS): Spero Dedes, Trent Green, Tiki Barber, and Jamie Erdahl
- NoExtraPoints AAF

Game information

First quarter

- No scoring plays.

Second quarter

- SA – Nick Rose 29-yard field goal, 10:39. Commanders 3–0.
- SA – Nick Rose 23-yard field goal, 3:50. Commanders 6–0.
- SD – Donny Hageman 47-yard field goal, 1:17. Commanders 6–3.
- SD – Donny Hageman 28-yard field goal, 0:02. Tied 6–6.

Third quarter

- No scoring plays.

Fourth quarter

- SA – Kenneth Farrow II 3-yard run (run failed), 14:56. Commanders 12–6.
- SA – Nick Rose 28-yard field goal, 3:34. Commanders 15–6.

Top passers

- SD – Mike Bercovici – 15/25, 176 yards, 2 INT
- SA – Logan Woodside – 18/36, 255 yards, 2 INT

Top rushers

- SD – Ja'Quan Gardner – 8 carries, 55 yards
- SA – Aaron Green – 6 carries, 43 yards

Top receivers

- SD – Brian Brown – 5 receptions, 66 yards
- SA – Mekale McKay – 5 receptions, 80 yards

==== Week 2: vs. Atlanta ====
Week 2: Atlanta Legends at San Diego Fleet – Game summary

Quarter	1	2	3	4	Total
Legends	9	0	0	3	12
Fleet	0	6	3	15	24

at SDCCU Stadium, San Diego, California

- Date: February 17
- Game time: 5:00 p.m. PT
- Game attendance: 20,019
- Referee: Brandon Cruse
- TV announcers (NFL Network): Andrew Siciliano, Marvin Lewis, Maurice Jones-Drew
- NoExtraPoints AAF

Game information

First quarter

- ATL – Younghoe Koo 29-yard field goal, 7:17. Legends 3–0.
- ATL – Malachi Jones 19-yard pass from Matt Simms (pass failed), 3:21. Legends 9–0.

Second quarter

- SD – Donny Hageman 46-yard field goal, 1:39. Legends 9–3.
- SD – Donny Hageman 43-yard field goal, 0:08. Legends 9–6.

Third quarter

- SD – Donny Hageman 26-yard field goal, 12:10. Legends 9–9.

Fourth quarter

- ATL – Younghoe Koo 26-yard field goal, 14:54. Legends 12–9.
- SD – Ja'Quan Gardner 8-yard run (pass failed), 9:04. Fleet 15–12.
- SD – Ja'Quan Gardner 7-yard run (run failed), 4:00. Fleet 21–12.
- SD – Donny Hageman 33-yard field goal, 0:35. Fleet 24–12.

Top passers

- ATL – Matt Simms – 17/25, 160 yards, TD, INT
- SD – Philip Nelson – 14/30, 142 yards, INT

Top rushers

- ATL – Lawrence Pittman – 9 carries, 42 yards
- SD – Ja'Quan Gardner – 15 carries, 104 yards, 2 TD

Top receivers

- ATL – Akrum Wadley – 8 receptions, 70 yards
- SD – Nelson Spruce – 4 receptions, 58 yards

==== Week 3: vs. San Antonio ====
Week 3: San Antonio Commanders at San Diego Fleet – Game summary

Quarter	1	2	3	4	Total
Commanders	8	0	3	0	11
Fleet	6	16	6	3	31

at SDCCU Stadium, San Diego, California

- Date: February 24
- Game time: 5:00 p.m. PT
- Game attendance: 14,789
- Referee: Tra Blake
- TV announcers (NFL Network): Dan Hellie, Marvin Lewis, Maurice Jones-Drew
- NoExtraPoints AAF

Game information

First quarter

- SA – Mekale McKay 47-yard pass from Logan Woodside (Logan Woodside–Evan Rodriguez pass), 14:47. Commanders 8–0.
- SD – Nelson Spruce 3-yard pass from Philip Nelson (pass failed), 3:17. Commanders 8–6.

Second quarter

- SD – A. J. Tarpley 27-yard interception return (Terrell Watson run), 11:02. Fleet 14–8.
- SD – Nelson Spruce 18-yard pass from Philip Nelson (Terrell Watson run), 2:13. Fleet 22–8.

Third quarter

- SD – Ja'Quan Gardner 83-yard run (pass failed), 8:21. Fleet 28–8.
- SA – Nick Rose 23-yard field goal, 3:29. Fleet 28–11.

Fourth quarter

- SD – Donny Hageman 35-yard field goal, 11:53. Fleet 31–11.

Top passers

- SA – Logan Woodside – 12/23, 151 yards, TD, 2 INT
- SD – Philip Nelson – 17/25, 193 yards, 2 TD, INT

Top rushers

- SA – Trey Williams – 7 carries, 75 yards
- SD – Ja'Quan Gardner – 12 carries, 122 yards, TD

Top receivers

- SA – Mekale McKay – 4 receptions, 91 yards, TD
- SD – Nelson Spruce – 4 receptions, 50 yards, 2 TD

==== Week 4: at Memphis ====
Week 4: San Diego Fleet at Memphis Express – Game summary

Quarter	1	2	3	4	Total
Fleet	14	6	0	3	23
Express	3	12	0	11	26

at Liberty Bowl Memorial Stadium, Memphis, Tennessee

- Date: March 2
- Game time: 1:00 p.m. PT
- Game attendance: 13,621
- Referee: James Carter
- TV announcers (B/R Live): Mark Malone, James Jones
- NoExtraPoints AAF

Game information

First quarter

- SD – Ron Brooks 57-yard punt return for touchdown (run failed), 12:22. Fleet 6–0.
- MEM – Austin MacGinnis 46-yard field goal, 3:21. Fleet 6–3.
- SD – Dontez Ford 6-yard pass from Philip Nelson (Terrell Watson run), 0:57. Fleet 14–3.

Second quarter

- MEM – Austin MacGinnis 40-yard field goal, 10:58. Fleet 14–6.
- SD – Marcus Baugh 30-yard pass from Alex Ross (run failed), 5:41. Fleet 20–6.
- MEM – Austin MacGinnis 35-yard field goal, 1:55. Fleet 20–9.
- MEM – Zach Mettenberger 1-yard run (pass failed), 0:18. Fleet 20–15.

Third quarter

- No scoring plays.

Fourth quarter

- SD – Donny Hageman 46-yard field goal, 14:03. Fleet 23–15.
- MEM – Terrence Magee 6-yard pass from Zach Mettenberger (Zach Mettenberger run), 6:01. Tied 23–23.
- MEM – Austin MacGinnis 45-yard field goal, 2:42. Express 26–23.

Top passers

- SD – Philip Nelson – 9/12, 110 yards, TD
- MEM – Zach Mettenberger – 18/25, 174 yards, TD

Top rushers

- SD – Terrell Watson – 10 carries, 43 yards
- MEM – Zac Stacy – 18 carries, 39 yards

Top receivers

- SD – Dontez Ford – 3 receptions, 71 yards, TD
- MEM – Reece Horn – 4 receptions, 63 yards

==== Week 5: vs. Salt Lake ====
Week 5: Salt Lake Stallions at San Diego Fleet – Game summary

Quarter	1	2	3	4	Total
Stallions	8	0	3	14	25
Fleet	3	3	12	9	27

at SDCCU Stadium, San Diego, California

- Date: March 9
- Game time: 5:00 p.m. PT
- Game attendance: 20,823
- Referee: Jeff Heaser
- TV announcers (NFL Network): Dan Hellie, Steve Mariucci, Marvin Lewis
- NoExtraPoints AAF

Game information

First quarter

- SD – Donny Hageman 39-yard field goal, 4:56. Fleet 3–0.
- SL – Joel Bouagnon 3-yard run (Josh Woodrum run), 0:27. Stallions 8–3.

Second quarter

- SD – Donny Hageman 34-yard field goal, 13:15. Stallions 8–6.

Third quarter

- SL – Taylor Bertolet 44-yard field goal, 8:15. Stallions 11–6.
- SD – Jordan Martin 41-yard fumble return (run failed), 3:06. Fleet 12–11.
- SD – Ben Johnson 18-yard pass from Mike Bercovici (run failed), 2:15. Fleet 18–11.

Fourth quarter

- SD – Kameron Kelly 23-yard interception return (run failed), 9:26. Fleet 24–11.
- SL – Joel Bouagnon 4-yard run (run failed), 4:02. Fleet 24–17.
- SL – Nick Truesdell 6-yard pass from Josh Woodrum (Josh Woodrum–Kenny Bell), 0:51. Stallions 25–24.
- SD – Donny Hageman 44-yard field goal, 0:00. Fleet 27–25.

Top passers

- SL – Josh Woodrum – 31/48, 380 yards, TD, 3 INT
- SD – Mike Bercovici – 22/43, 304 yards, TD, INT

Top rushers

- SL – Joel Bouagnon – 11 carries, 36 yards, 2 TD
- SD – Terrell Watson – 5 carries, 14 yards

Top receivers

- SL – De'Mornay Pierson-El – 8 receptions, 130 yards
- SD – Dontez Ford – 3 receptions, 94 yards

==== Week 6: vs. Birmingham ====
Week 6: Birmingham Iron at San Diego Fleet – Game summary

Quarter	1	2	3	4	Total
Iron	6	9	6	11	32
Fleet	3	6	14	6	29

at SDCCU Stadium, San Diego, California

- Date: March 17
- Game time: 5:00 p.m. PT
- Game attendance: 20,986
- Referee: John O’Neill
- TV announcers (CBS Sports Network): Ben Holden, Adam Archuleta, John Schriffen
- NoExtraPoints AAF

Game information

First quarter

- SD – Donny Hageman 36-yard field goal, 6:54. Fleet 3–0.
- BIRM – Trent Richardson 13-yard pass from Luis Perez (pass failed), 0:27. Iron 6–3.

Second quarter

- BIRM – L'Damian Washington 83-yard pass from Luis Perez (run failed), 8:43. Iron 12–3.
- SD – Ben Johnson 1-yard pass from Mike Bercovici (pass failed), 7:27. Iron 12–9.
- BIRM – Nick Novak 23-yard field goal, 0:15. Iron 15–9.

Third quarter

- BIRM – Trent Richardson 2-yard run (pass failed), 10:38. Iron 21–9.
- SD – Terrell Watson 2-yard run (Mike Bercovici–Brian Brown pass), 8:56. Iron 21–17.
- SD – Terrell Watson 12-yard pass from Mike Bercovici (run failed), 4:57. Fleet 23–21.

Fourth quarter

- BIRM – L'Damian Washington 23-yard pass from Luis Perez (Luis Perez–L'Damian Washington pass), 14:10. Iron 29–23.
- SD – Francis Owusu 13-yard pass from Mike Bercovici (pass failed), 4:32. Tied 29–29.
- BIRM – Nick Novak 44-yard field goal, 0:00. Iron 32–29.

Top passers

- BIRM – Luis Perez – 27/49, 359 yards, 3 TD, 2 INT
- SD – Mike Bercovici – 17/34, 311 yards, 3 TD, 2 INT

Top rushers

- BIRM – Trent Richardson – 16 carries, 46 yards, TD
- SD – Terrell Watson – 8 carries, 38 yards, TD

Top receivers

- BIRM – L'Damian Washington – 4 receptions, 83 yards, 2 TD
- SD – Dontez Ford – 3 receptions, 72 yards

==== Week 7: at Arizona ====
Week 7: San Diego Fleet at Arizona Hotshots – Game summary

Quarter	1	2	3	4	Total
Fleet	9	6	0	0	15
Hotshots	9	14	0	9	32

at Sun Devil Stadium, Tempe, Arizona

- Date: March 24
- Game time: 1:00 p.m. PT
- Game weather: Sunny, 77 °F (25 °C)
- Game attendance: 9,760
- Referee: Reggie Smith
- TV announcers (CBS Sports Network): Ben Holden, Adam Archuleta, Melanie Collins
- NoExtraPoints AAF

Game information

First quarter

- SD – Terrell Watson 3-yard run (pass failed), 11:03. Fleet 6–0.
- ARIZ – Trevor Knight 7-yard run (run failed), 6:55. Tied 6–6.
- SD – Donny Hageman 47-yard field goal, 2:31. Fleet 9–6.
- ARIZ – Nick Folk 54-yard field goal, 0:32. Tied 9–9.

Second quarter

- ARIZ – Thomas Duarte 36-yard pass from John Wolford (Richard Mullaney–Marquis Bundy pass), 6:27. Hotshots 17–9.
- ARIZ – Deion Holliman 15-yard pass from John Wolford (pass failed), 2:19. Hotshots 23–9.
- SD – Marcus Baugh 38-yard pass from Mike Bercovici (pass failed), 0:07. Hotshots 23–15.

Third quarter

- No scoring plays.

Fourth quarter

- ARIZ – John Wolford 35-yard run (pass failed), 6:08. Hotshots 29–15.
- ARIZ – Nick Folk 20-yard field goal, 3:52. Hotshots 32–15.

Top passers

- SD – Mike Bercovici – 22/43, 310 yards, TD, 2 INT
- ARIZ – John Wolford – 15/19, 212 yards, 2 TD, INT

Top rushers

- SD – Bishop Sankey – 12 carries, 54 yards
- ARIZ – Jhurell Pressley – 15 carries, 64 yards

Top receivers

- SD – Nelson Spruce – 12 receptions, 146 yards
- ARIZ – Rashad Ross – 3 receptions, 53 yards

==== Week 8: at Salt Lake ====
Week 8: San Diego Fleet at Salt Lake Stallions – Game summary

Quarter	1	2	3	4	Total
Fleet	0	0	0	3	3
Stallions	0	8	0	0	8

at Rice–Eccles Stadium, Salt Lake City, Utah

- Date: March 30
- Game time: 5:00 p.m. PT
- Game weather: Cloudy, 49 °F (9 °C)
- Game attendance: 8,405
- Referee: Brandon Cruse
- TV announcers (NFL Network): Matt "Money" Smith, Marvin Lewis, Jason Fisher
- NoExtraPoints AAF

Game information

First quarter

- No scoring plays.

Second quarter

- SL – Joel Bouagnon 4-yard run (Josh Woodrum–Jordan Leslie pass), 1:18. Stallions 8–0.

Third quarter

- No scoring plays.

Fourth quarter

- SD – Donny Hageman 29-yard field goal, 10:45. Stallions 8–3.

Top passers

- SD – Mike Bercovici – 22/47, 210 yards, 2 INT
- SL – Josh Woodrum – 21/32, 155 yards, 2 INT

Top rushers

- SD – Bishop Sankey – 11 carries, 42 yards
- SL – Terron Ward – 18 carries, 47 yards

Top receivers

- SD – Nelson Spruce – 8 receptions, 79 yards
- SL – Anthony Denham – 4 receptions, 32 yards

== Media ==
On February 7, 2019, the Fleet announced that KLSD and KOGO would be the team's flagship radio stations. Jon Schaeffer handled play-by-play with former Charger Rich Ohrnberger doing color commentary. KOGO also airs in greater L.A.
