= Meffy Koloamatangi =

American gridiron football player (born 1995)

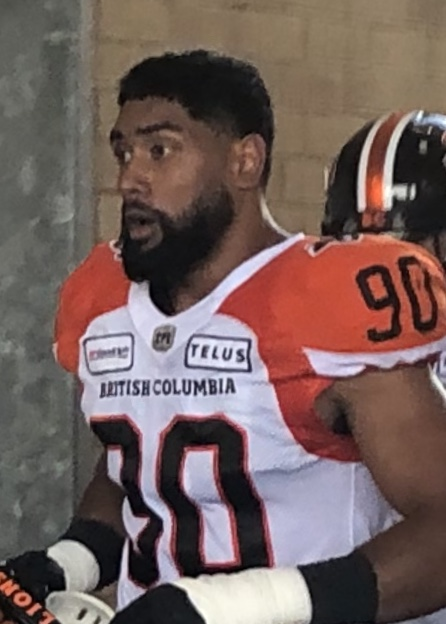
- Koloamatangi with the BC Lions in 2019

No. 97, 90
- Position: Defensive end

Personal information
- Born: June 24, 1995 (age 31); East Palo Alto, California, U.S.
- Listed height: 6 ft 5 in (1.96 m)
- Listed weight: 240 lb (109 kg)

Career information
- High school: Woodside (CA)
- College: Hawaii
- NFL draft: 2018: undrafted

Career history
- San Diego Fleet (2019); BC Lions (2019); Winnipeg Blue Bombers (2019); Vegas Knight Hawks (2022)

Awards and highlights
- Grey Cup champion (2019)

Career CFL statistics
- Games played: 5
- Total tackles: 3
- Stats at CFL.ca

Matthew "Meffy" Koloamatangi (born June 24, 1995) is an American former professional football defensive end. He played college football at Hawaii.

== College career ==
Koloamatangi was a member of the football team at Hawaii from 2013 to 2017. While at Hawaii, he was named an honorable mention All-Mountain West twice and compiled 80 tackles and 7 sacks over three years of playing time. He was also shown to have an impact on special teams blocking kicks, including two in a game against Western Carolina.

== Professional career ==
After going undrafted in 2018, Koloamatangi received an invitation to participate in the Oakland Raiders rookie camp but was not signed. He was added to the San Diego Fleet roster of the Alliance of American Football in 2019, compiling 7.5 tackles and 0.5 sacks before the league folded operations later that year.

Koloamatangi was added to the roster of the BC Lions on May 18, 2019. He was released from the roster on July 17, 2019. He was later added to the practice squad of the Winnipeg Blue Bombers on September 24, 2019 and was on it when they won the 107th Grey Cup.

On March 7, 2022, Koloamatangi signed with the Vegas Knight Hawks of the Indoor Football League (IFL).

== Personal life ==
Koloamatangi's brother Leo also played at Hawaii and was a member of the New York Jets.
