= Philip Nelson (American football) =

American gridiron football player (born 1993)

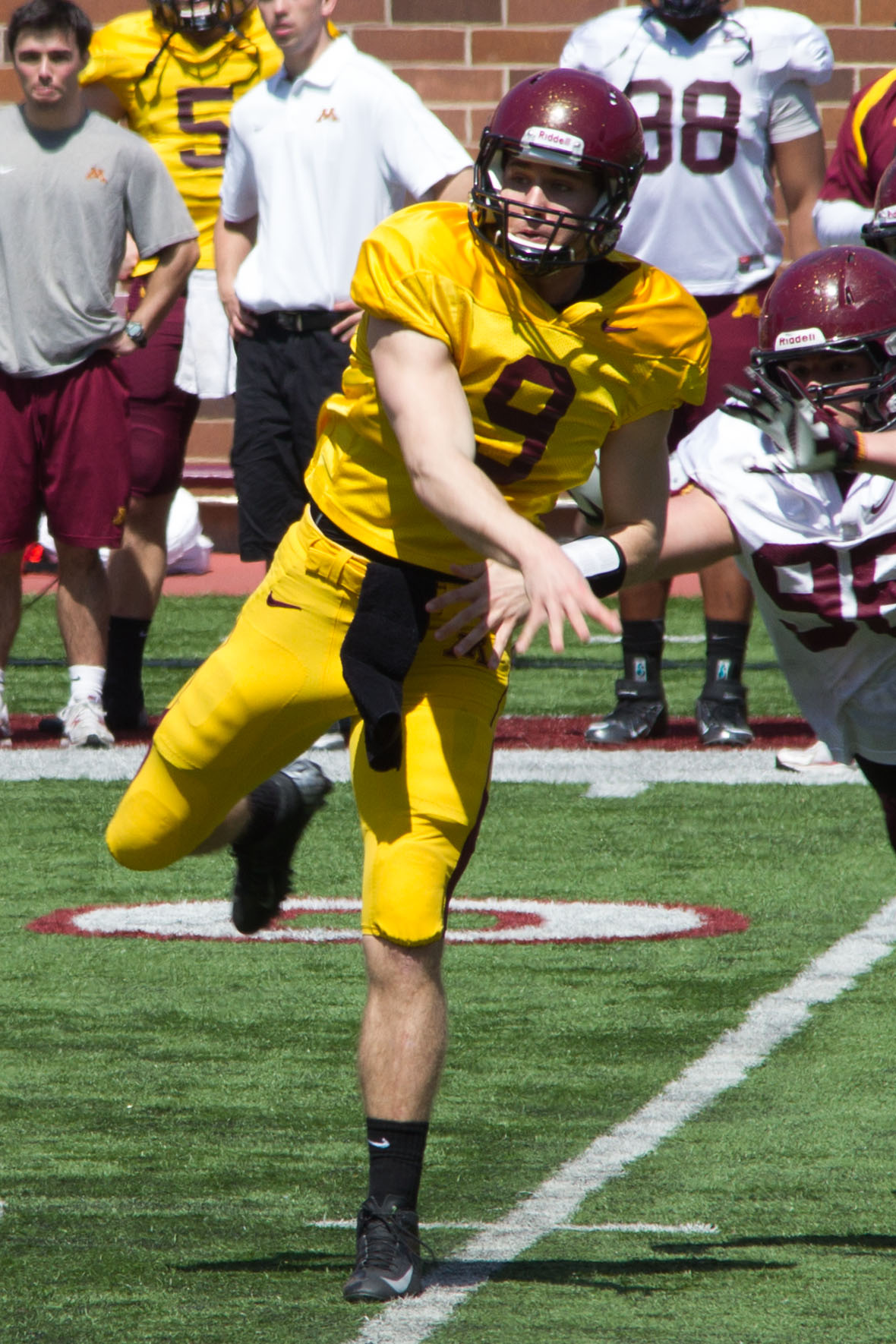
- Nelson with the Minnesota Golden Gophers in 2013

No. 9
- Position: Quarterback

Personal information
- Born: September 11, 1993 (age 33); Madison, Wisconsin, U.S.
- Listed height: 6 ft 3 in (1.91 m)
- Listed weight: 222 lb (101 kg)

Career information
- High school: Mankato (MN) West
- College: Minnesota (2012–2013); East Carolina (2015–2016)
- NFL draft: 2017: undrafted

Career history
- Winnipeg Blue Bombers (2018)*; San Diego Fleet (2019); Dallas Renegades (2020); Montreal Alouettes (2021)*
- * Offseason or practice squad member only
- Stats at Pro Football Reference

Philip Nelson (born September 11, 1993) is an American former football quarterback. He played for the San Diego Fleet of the Alliance of American Football (AAF) in 2019, and the Dallas Renegades of the XFL in 2020.

== Early life ==
Nelson attended Mankato West High School in Mankato, Minnesota. There he was a standout member of the football team, setting several state records on his way to winning the 2011 Minnesota Mr. Football Award. He is the son of Pat and Norma Nelson.

College recruiting
Name	Hometown	School	Height	Weight	40^{‡}	Commit date
Philip Nelson; QB	Mankato, Minnesota	Mankato West High School	6 ft 3 in (1.91 m)	213 lb (97 kg)	4.48	Feb 19, 2011
Philip Nelson; QB	Recruit ratings: Scout: Rivals: (74)					
Overall recruit ranking: Scout: 46 (QB) Rivals: 15 (QB), 2 (MN) ESPN: 94 (QB), 188 (Regional), 7 (MN)
Note: In many cases, Scout, Rivals, 247Sports, On3, and ESPN may conflict in their listings of height and weight.; In these cases, the average was taken. ESPN grades are on a 100-point scale.; Sources: "Minnesota Football Commitment List". Rivals.; "Minnesota College Football Recruiting Commits". Scout.; "ESPN". ESPN.; "Scout.com Team Recruiting Rankings". Scout.; "2012 Team Ranking". Rivals.com.

Nelson was scouted by Football Bowl Subdivision scouts during his junior year in high school. It was originally perceived that Nelson would be a very sought-after recruit during his senior year by numerous Big Ten schools and was highly regarded by recruiting expert Tom Lemming. Nelson conducted initial visits to a handful of schools to include Iowa State, Wisconsin, Iowa and Minnesota.

Upon visiting Minnesota in December 2010, Nelson received his first scholarship offer from Minnesota Head Coach Jerry Kill. Nelson committed to Minnesota on February 19, 2011.

== College career ==
=== Minnesota ===
On October 20, 2012, Nelson's redshirt was pulled after struggling starter MarQueis Gray was injured the week before. Nelson's first game of his collegiate career came against the Wisconsin Badgers. The Gophers lost the game but Nelson passed for two touchdowns and was also the Gophers' leading rusher in the game. Nelson started the final seven games as a true freshman at Minnesota going 2–5 and the Gophers were invited to a bowl game for the first time since 2009. They lost in the Meineke Car Care Bowl of Texas to Texas Tech 34–31 on December 28, 2012.

In Nelson's sophomore season, he endured peaks and valleys as the starting quarterback. He played in 12 games and led the Gophers to a 4–0 record at the beginning of the season. A hamstring injury against Iowa hampered Nelson's ability to be effective against the Hawkeyes. The Gophers lost 23–7. The next week against Michigan, back up quarterback Mitch Leidner took most of the reps but the Gophers were dismantled 42–13. Now on a losing streak and with ailing coach Jerry Kill watching from a private box, the Gophers hoped to get back on track against Northwestern. Leidner was replaced by a healthy Nelson in the first half of that game and the Gophers hung on for a 20–17 victory. Nelson would start the next four games and lead the Gophers to three signature victories over No. 24 ranked Nebraska, Indiana, and Penn State. The last two games of the season saw Nelson and Leidner split snaps as the team lost to Michigan State and then Syracuse in the Texas Bowl on December 28, 2013.

=== Rutgers ===
On January 16, 2014, Nelson announced he was transferring from Minnesota; he would still have two years to play for a new team. On January 29, 2014, Nelson transferred to Rutgers. On May 13, 2014, he was dismissed from Rutgers following assault charges leading to a guilty plea for a fifth degree misdemeanor.

=== East Carolina ===
In August 2015, Nelson walked on at East Carolina after soliciting interest from other teams. After winning the starting quarterback job, Nelson and the Pirates started the season 2–0 with wins against in-state rivals, Western Carolina and NC State. Nelson threw a combined six touchdown passes and ran for one score in those two matchups. However, following a loss with South Carolina the next week, the ECU squad would only win one more game the rest of the season.

After the season came to a close, Nelson was invited to participate in the 2017 NFLPA Collegiate Bowl. Nelson was named the National team's MVP as he led his squad on a 14-play scoring drive in the opening series of the game.

== Professional career ==
=== Winnipeg Blue Bombers ===
In January 2018, Nelson signed with the Canadian Football League's Winnipeg Blue Bombers to compete for the fourth-string backup quarterback position. He was cut from the team in May before training camp.

=== San Diego Fleet ===
In the third round of the inaugural AAF QB Draft, Nelson was picked by the San Diego Fleet with the eighth selection.

Nelson began the 2019 AAF season as the Fleet's second-string quarterback behind Mike Bercovici. After Bercovici struggled for much of the season opener against the San Antonio Commanders, Nelson relieved him late in the game, completing 5 of 10 passes for 68 yards and an interception in the 15–6 loss. Nelson was eventually named the starter for the following week's game against the Atlanta Legends. In his first start against the Atlanta Legends, he completed 14 of 30 passes for 142 and an interception as the Fleet won 24–12. The following week's matchup against the Commanders saw Nelson throw an interception on the first play before rebounding with two touchdown passes in a 31–11 San Diego victory. During the fourth game against the Memphis Express, Nelson threw a touchdown before exiting in the second quarter with a shoulder injury; he was replaced by Alex Ross as the Fleet fell 26–23. The injury, later revealed to be a clavicle fracture, sidelined Nelson for the next month, and he was eventually placed on injured reserve. The league ceased operations in April 2019.

=== Dallas Renegades ===
Nelson was taken by the Dallas Renegades with the 52nd pick of the 2020 XFL draft. Nelson started in a week 1 15–9 loss to the St. Louis Battlehawks following an injury to starting quarterback Landry Jones. Nelson started again in a week 5 30–12 loss to the New York Guardians after another injury to starting quarterback Landry Jones. He had his contract terminated when the league suspended operations on April 10, 2020.

=== Montreal Alouettes ===
Nelson signed with the Montreal Alouettes of the CFL on January 22, 2021. He was released before the start of the regular season on May 27.

== Career statistics ==
=== Professional ===
Year	Team	League	Games			Passing								Rushing			
Year	Team	League	GP	GS	Record	Cmp	Att	Pct	Yds	Y/A	TD	Int	Rtg	Att	Yds	Avg	TD
2019	SD	AAF	4	3	2–1	45	77	58.4	513	6.7	3	3	75.3	16	82	5.1	0
2020	DAL	XFL	5	2	0–2	62	94	66.0	430	4.6	0	3	62.8	5	25	5.0	0
Career			9	5	2–3	107	171	62.6	943	5.5	3	6	68.3	21	107	5.1	0

=== College ===
Year	Team	Games			Passing								Rushing			
Year	Team	GP	GS	Record	Cmp	Att	Pct	Yds	Avg	TD	Int	Rtg	Att	Yds	Avg	TD
2012	Minnesota	7	7	2–5	75	152	49.3	873	5.7	8	8	104.4	69	184	2.7	0
2013	Minnesota	12	9	5–4	94	186	50.5	1,306	7.0	9	6	119.0	93	364	3.9	6
2014	Rutgers	Dismissed from team before season														
2015	East Carolina	Did not play due to transfer rules														
2016	East Carolina	10	10	3–7	237	349	67.9	2,621	7.5	16	8	141.5	62	57	0.9	2
Career		29	26	10–16	406	687	59.1	4,800	7.0	33	22	127.2	224	605	2.7	8

== Assault charges ==
Nelson was charged with first- and third-degree assault for kicking former Minnesota State Mankato football player Isaac Kolstad in the head during the early morning hours of May 11, 2014, after a night of underage drinking. The argument allegedly involved conversation surrounding a bar bouncer hitting on Nelson's girlfriend. Other people around the area reported that Nelson allegedly kicked Kolstad while he was unconscious, following being punched by a third party, Trevor Shelley. Shelley, also facing first- and third-degree assault charges, told police he did not hit Kolstad. Kolstad was left unable to breathe on his own following significant destruction of brain tissue and underwent surgeries. Surveillance video of the fight shows Kolstad throwing the first punch, knocking Nelson to the ground. The fight lasted eight seconds. Nelson, age 20, and Kolstad were both intoxicated, according to police. Kolstad's injuries included a skull fracture, brain shifting, brain bleeding and lung deterioration due to lack of oxygen. Kolstad moved home with his wife and two daughters in 2014 but have since divorced. Kolstad suffered permanent brain damage.

Nelson pleaded guilty to lesser charges and reached a civil settlement with Kolstad in 2018.
