= Marcus Baugh =

American football player (born 1994)

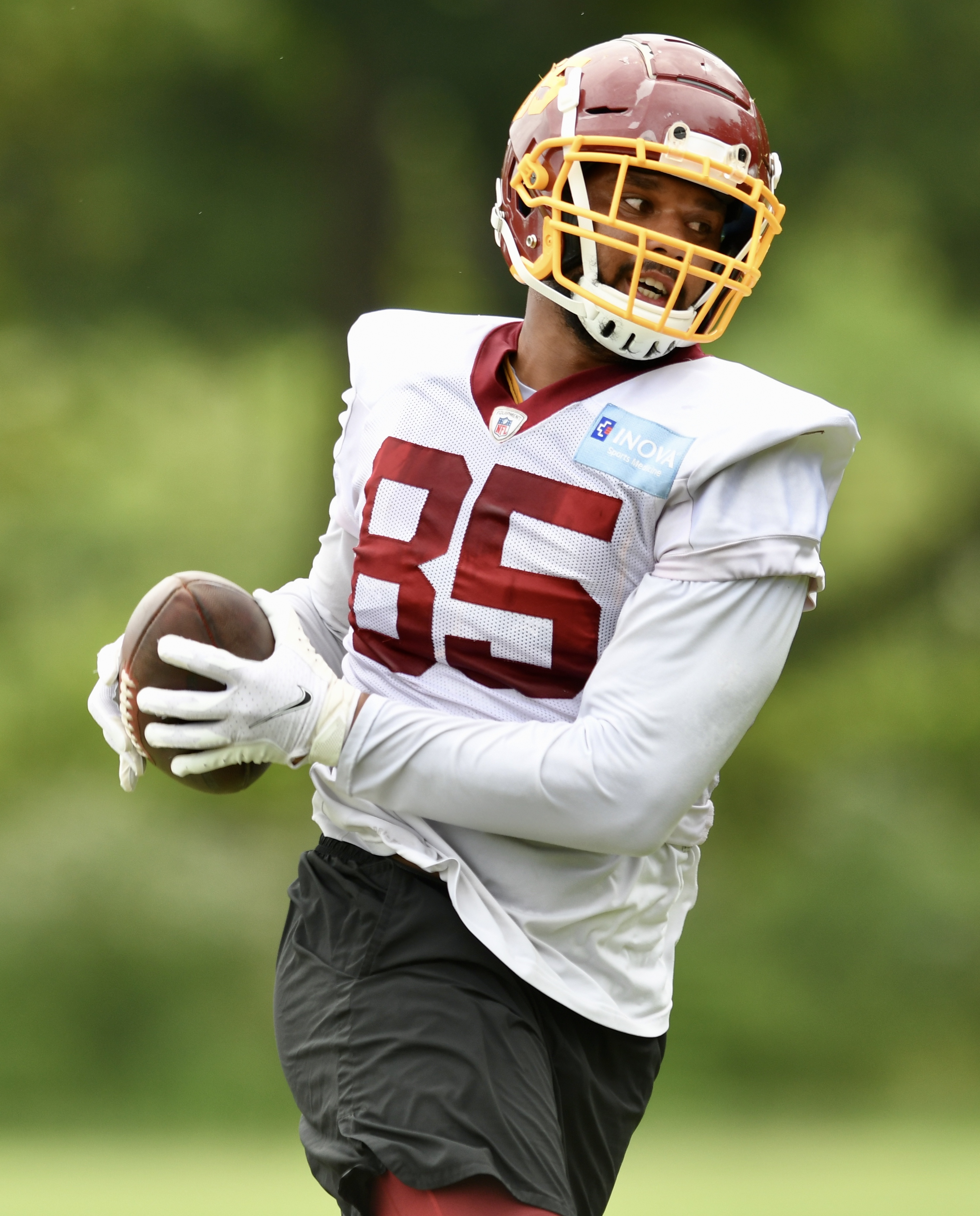
- Baugh with the Washington Football Team in 2020

Profile
- Position: Tight end

Personal information
- Born: December 9, 1994 (age 31); Riverside, California, U.S.
- Listed height: 6 ft 4 in (1.93 m)
- Listed weight: 246 lb (112 kg)

Career information
- High school: John W. North (Riverside, California)
- College: Ohio State (2013–2017)
- NFL draft: 2018: undrafted

Career history
- Oakland Raiders (2018)*; San Diego Fleet (2019); Carolina Panthers (2019); Washington Football Team (2020); Pittsburgh Steelers (2021)*; Michigan Panthers (2022–2023); New Orleans Breakers (2024)*; Birmingham Stallions (2024–2025)
- * Offseason or practice squad member only

Awards and highlights
- UFL champion (2024)

Career NFL statistics
- Receptions: 1
- Receiving yards: 2
- Stats at Pro Football Reference

Marcus Baugh (born December 9, 1994) is an American professional football tight end. He played college football at Ohio State and was signed as an undrafted free agent by the Oakland Raiders in 2018. He has also been a member of the San Diego Fleet of the Alliance of American Football (AAF), and the Carolina Panthers, Washington Football Team and Pittsburgh Steelers of the National Football League (NFL), and the Michigan Panthers and New Orleans Breakers of the United States Football League (USFL).

== Early life and college ==
Baugh attended John W. North High School in Riverside, California. A four-star recruit, Baugh committed to play football at Ohio State. At Ohio State, Baugh had 52 receptions, 573 receiving yards and seven touchdowns in his final two seasons.

== Professional career ==
Pre-draft measurables
Height	Weight	Arm length	Hand span	40-yard dash	10-yard split	20-yard split	20-yard shuttle	Three-cone drill	Vertical jump	Broad jump
6 ft 3 1/2 in (1.92 m)	247 lb (112 kg)	33 1/2 in (0.85 m)	10 in (0.25 m)	4.77 s	1.70 s	2.83 s	4.51 s	7.28 s	33.0 in (0.84 m)	9 ft 9 in (2.97 m)
All values from NFL Combine/Pro Day

=== Oakland Raiders ===
Baugh signed as an undrafted free agent with the Oakland Raiders in 2018 but was waived prior to the regular season.

=== San Diego Fleet ===
Baugh then signed with the San Diego Fleet of the Alliance of American Football (AAF) in early 2019, where he caught 13 passes for 208 yards and two touchdowns before the league folded in April 2019.

=== Carolina Panthers ===
In April 2019, Baugh signed with the Carolina Panthers but was placed on injured reserve in the preseason before being waived in February 2020.

=== Washington Football Team ===
Baugh signed with the Washington Football Team in March 2020. He was waived on October 22, but re-signed to their practice squad two days later. Baugh was promoted back to the active roster on December 9. Baugh was waived by Washington on May 10, 2021.

=== Pittsburgh Steelers ===
On July 30, 2021, Baugh signed with the Pittsburgh Steelers. He was waived by the Steelers on August 28.

=== Michigan Panthers ===
On March 10, 2022, Baugh was drafted by the Michigan Panthers of the United States Football League (USFL). He was transferred to the inactive roster on May 11 with a hand injury. He was moved back to the active roster on May 20.

=== New Orleans Breakers ===
Baugh signed with the New Orleans Breakers on October 16, 2023. The Breakers folded when the XFL and USFL merged to create the United Football League (UFL).

=== Birmingham Stallions ===
On January 5, 2023, Baugh was drafted by the Birmingham Stallions during the 2024 UFL dispersal draft. He re-signed with the team on August 14, 2024.

On March 20, 2025, Baugh was released by the Stallions and was subsequently resigned on April 2.
