= Donny Hageman =

American football player (born 1993)

No. 2
- Position: Placekicker

Personal information
- Born: February 17, 1993 (age 33); Covina, California, U.S.
- Listed height: 6 ft 1 in (1.85 m)
- Listed weight: 175 lb (79 kg)

Career information
- High school: Damien (CA)
- College: San Diego State
- NFL draft: 2016: undrafted

Career history
- Los Angeles Kiss (2016); San Diego Fleet (2019); St. Louis BattleHawks (2023)

Awards and highlights
- XFL Longest field goal (59 yards)

Don Hageman III (born February 17, 1993) is an American former football placekicker. He played college football at San Diego State.

== College career ==
=== Mt. San Antonio ===
As a freshman and sophomore at Mt. San Antonio College, Hageman played football, as a placekicker and a punter, and competed in track and field. As a football player, he was named first-team all-conference and recorded a long field goal of 43 yards, making 19 of 20 attempts alongside 54 of 56 PATs.

=== San Diego State ===
As a junior, Hageman transferred to San Diego State, where he started all thirteen games as the placekicker and three also as the kickoff specialist. His 20 field goal makes (from 25 attempts) broke a SDSU school record, and he was a perfect 37/37 on PATs (only three prior SDSU kickers have made more PATs without a miss). He was named the Most Valuable Special Teams Player after the season.

As a senior, Hageman was named to all-MWC preseason first-teams by Phil Steele, Athlon Sports, ESPN, and other publications. He started all 14 games for the Aztecs, making all 57 of his attempted PATs and 17 of his 22 attempted field goals. Though San Diego State's website noted that he "can also punt if need be", Hageman never recorded a punt during his two years with the team.

In his 27 games with the Aztecs, there were only six in which he never recorded a point, and nine in which he recorded more than 10 points.

== Professional career ==
=== Los Angeles Kiss ===
Hageman was signed by the Los Angeles Kiss of the Arena Football League for the 2016 season. He saw limited action, making six extra points from eleven attempts. He did not attempt a field goal.

=== San Diego Fleet ===
On February 6, 2019, Hageman was signed by the San Diego Fleet of the Alliance of American Football, three days before the team's first game. In week five, he kicked a 44-yard game winning field goal as time expired to beat the Salt Lake Stallions. During his time in the AAF, he recorded a long field goal of 47 yards, and was one of four kickers to record a league-leading fourteen made field goals. The league ceased operations in April 2019.

=== St. Louis BattleHawks ===
On November 18, 2022, Hageman was drafted by the St. Louis BattleHawks of the XFL. Hageman's 59-yard field goal set the XFL record for the longest field goal, one that would stand until the next year when, after the league merged into the United Football League, Jake Bates of the Michigan Panthers kicked a 64-yard field goal. Hageman went unclaimed in the 2024 UFL dispersal draft on January 15, 2024.
