= Adam Humphries =

American football player (born 1993)

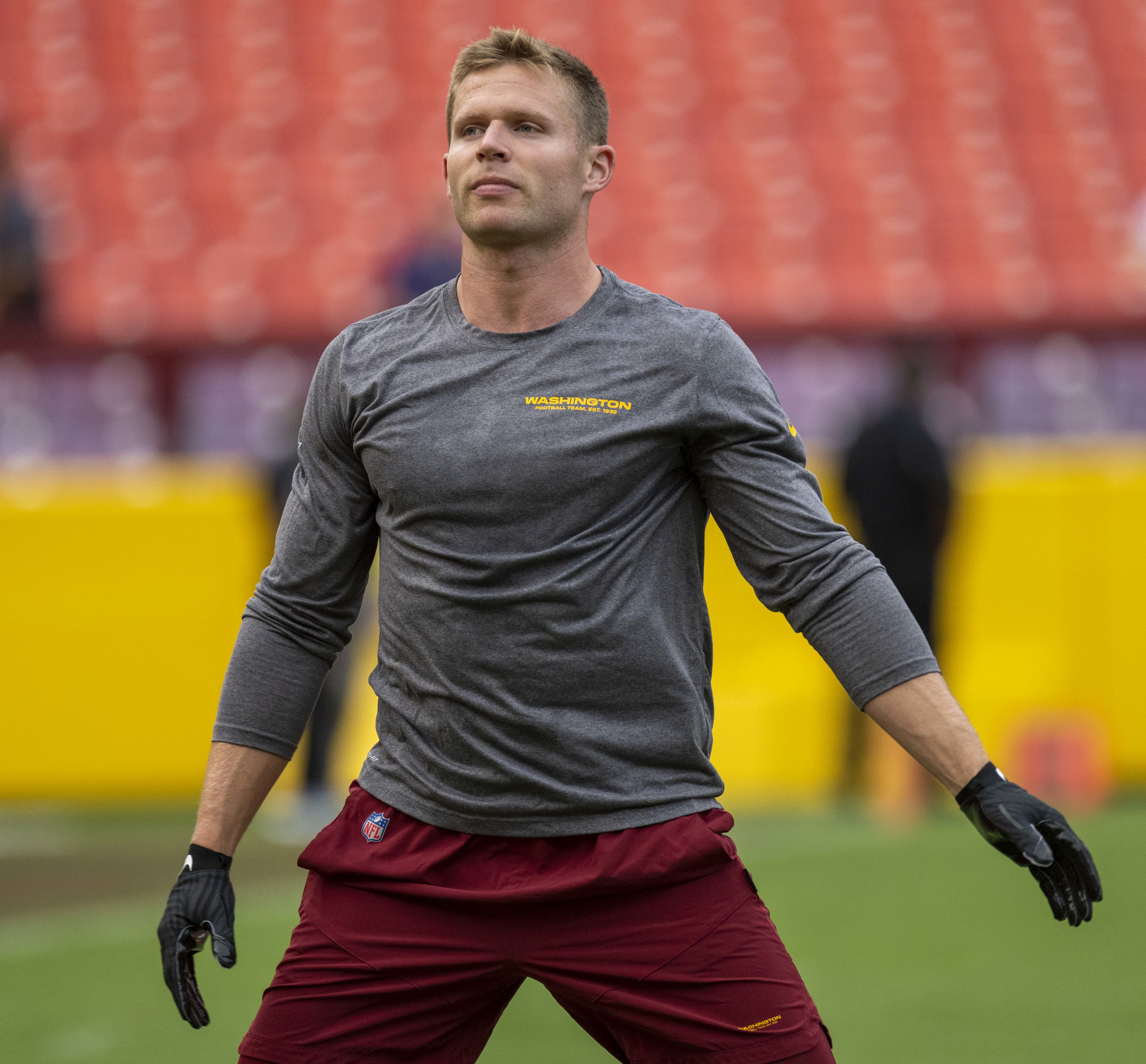
- Humphries with the Washington Football Team in 2021

No. 10, 11, 13
- Position: Wide receiver

Personal information
- Born: June 24, 1993 (age 33); Spartanburg, South Carolina, U.S.
- Listed height: 5 ft 11 in (1.80 m)
- Listed weight: 195 lb (88 kg)

Career information
- High school: Paul M. Dorman (Roebuck, South Carolina)
- College: Clemson (2011–2014)
- NFL draft: 2015: undrafted

Career history
- Tampa Bay Buccaneers (2015–2018); Tennessee Titans (2019–2020); Washington Football Team (2021); Houston Texans (2023)*
- * Offseason or practice squad member only

Career NFL statistics
- Receptions: 320
- Receiving yards: 3,314
- Rushing yards: 36
- Return yards: 567
- Total touchdowns: 13
- Stats at Pro Football Reference

Adam Humphries (born June 24, 1993) is an American former professional football player who was a wide receiver in the National Football League (NFL). He played college football for the Clemson Tigers and signed as an undrafted free agent with the Tampa Bay Buccaneers in 2015. Humphries was also a member of the Tennessee Titans, Washington Football Team, and Houston Texans.

== Early life ==
Humphries was born in Spartanburg, South Carolina on June 24, 1993. He attended Dorman High School in Roebuck, South Carolina and played varsity football and basketball for the Cavaliers.

== College career ==
Humphries played 53 games and started 27 of them for Clemson from 2011 to 2014. Through his college career, Humphries had a total of 127 receptions for 1,097 yards (8.6 avg.) and three touchdowns, as well as 10 carries for 24 yards and a touchdown and 69 punt returns for 476 yards (6.9 avg.) and a touchdown.

== Professional career ==
=== Pre-draft ===
Coming out of Clemson, Humphries was projected by the majority of analysts to go undrafted and to be signed as an undrafted free agent. He was not invited to the NFL Scouting Combine but attended Clemson's Pro Day.

Pre-draft measurables
Height	Weight	Arm length	Hand span	40-yard dash	10-yard split	20-yard split	20-yard shuttle	Three-cone drill	Vertical jump	Broad jump	Bench press
5 ft 10 in (1.78 m)	194 lb (88 kg)	30 in (0.76 m)	9 1/4 in (0.23 m)	4.53 s	1.59 s	2.64 s	4.32 s	6.96 s	32.5 in (0.83 m)	10 ft 2 in (3.10 m)	14 reps
All values from Clemson's Pro Day

=== Tampa Bay Buccaneers ===
==== 2015 season ====
Humphries went undrafted in the 2015 NFL draft, but accepted an invitation to attend rookie minicamp with the Tampa Bay Buccaneers.

On May 11, 2015, the Buccaneers signed Humphries to a three-year, $1.57 million contract that includes a signing bonus of $19,800. He entered training camp competing to be the Buccaneers' fifth wide receiver on their depth chart with Robert Herron, Donteea Dye, Rannell Hall, Tavarres King, and Kaelin Clay. On September 6, 2015, it was announced that Humphries had made the 53-man roster and would be a punt/kick returner and the Buccaneers' fifth wide receiver behind Vincent Jackson, Mike Evans, Louis Murphy, and Russell Shepard.

Humphries made his NFL debut in the season opener against the Tennessee Titans and finished the 42–14 loss with two receptions for 14 yards. On October 5, 2015, the Buccaneers waived Humphries and signed him to their practice squad two days later. After injuries to Vincent Jackson and Russell Shepard, it was announced that Humphries and Donteea Dye had been added to the active roster. During Week 14 against the New Orleans Saints, Humphries caught his first NFL touchdown on a six-yard reception from Jameis Winston in the 24–17 loss. In the next game against the St. Louis Rams on Thursday Night Football, Humphries had a season-high six receptions for 60 yards during the 31–23 road loss.

Humphries finished his rookie year with 27 receptions for 260 yards and a touchdown in 13 games and no starts.

==== 2016 season ====
Humphries entered training camp competing with Russell Shepard and Kenny Bell to be the Buccaneers' third wide receiver. New head coach Dirk Koetter named Humphries the team's third receiver.

Humphries earned his first NFL start in the season opener against the Atlanta Falcons and finished the 31–24 road victory with three receptions for 34 yards and a seven-yard carry. Two weeks later against the Los Angeles Rams, Humphries had his first 100-yard game, catching a season-high nine passes for 100 yards in the 37–32 loss.

During Week 9 against the Falcons, Humphries recorded five receptions for 46 yards and his first touchdown of the season on a seven-yard pass from Jameis Winston in the 43–28 loss. During a Week 15 26–20 road loss to the Dallas Cowboys, Humphries caught two passes for 49 yards and a season-long 42-yard touchdown reception. In the regular season finale against the Carolina Panthers, Humphries had a career-high 10 receptions for 94 yards during the narrow 17–16 victory.

Humphries finished his second professional season with 55 receptions for 622 yards and three touchdowns in 15 games and four starts.

==== 2017 season ====
On February 27, 2017, Humphries signed a one-year guaranteed contract tender with the Buccaneers worth $615,000. He entered the season third on the wide receiver depth chart behind Mike Evans and DeSean Jackson.

During a Week 15 24–21 loss to the Falcons on Monday Night Football, Humphries had five receptions for 43 yards and his only touchdown of the season to go along with a six-yard carry. In the regular season finale against the Saints, Humphries recorded seven receptions for 102 yards in the 31–24 victory.

Humphries finished the 2017 season with a career-high 61 receptions for 631 yards and a touchdown in 16 games and three starts.

==== 2018 season ====
On March 12, 2018, the Buccaneers placed a second-round restricted free agent tender on Humphries.

During Week 6 against the Falcons, Humphries had three catches for 82 yards, including a career-long 51-yard reception, in the 34–29 road loss. Three weeks later against the Panthers, he recorded eight receptions for 82 yards and a career-high two touchdowns in the 42–28 road loss.

During a Week 11 38–35 road loss to the New York Giants, Humphries caught three passes for 60 yards and a touchdown. In the next game against the San Francisco 49ers, he recorded six receptions for 50 yards and a touchdown during the 27–9 victory. The following week against the Panthers, Humphries had seven receptions for 61 yards and a touchdown in the 24–17 victory. During Week 15 against the Cowboys, he caught 10 passes for 79 yards in the 27–20 road loss.

Humphries finished the 2018 season with career highs in receptions with 76, receiving yards with 816, and touchdowns with five in 16 games and 10 starts.

=== Tennessee Titans ===
==== 2019 season ====
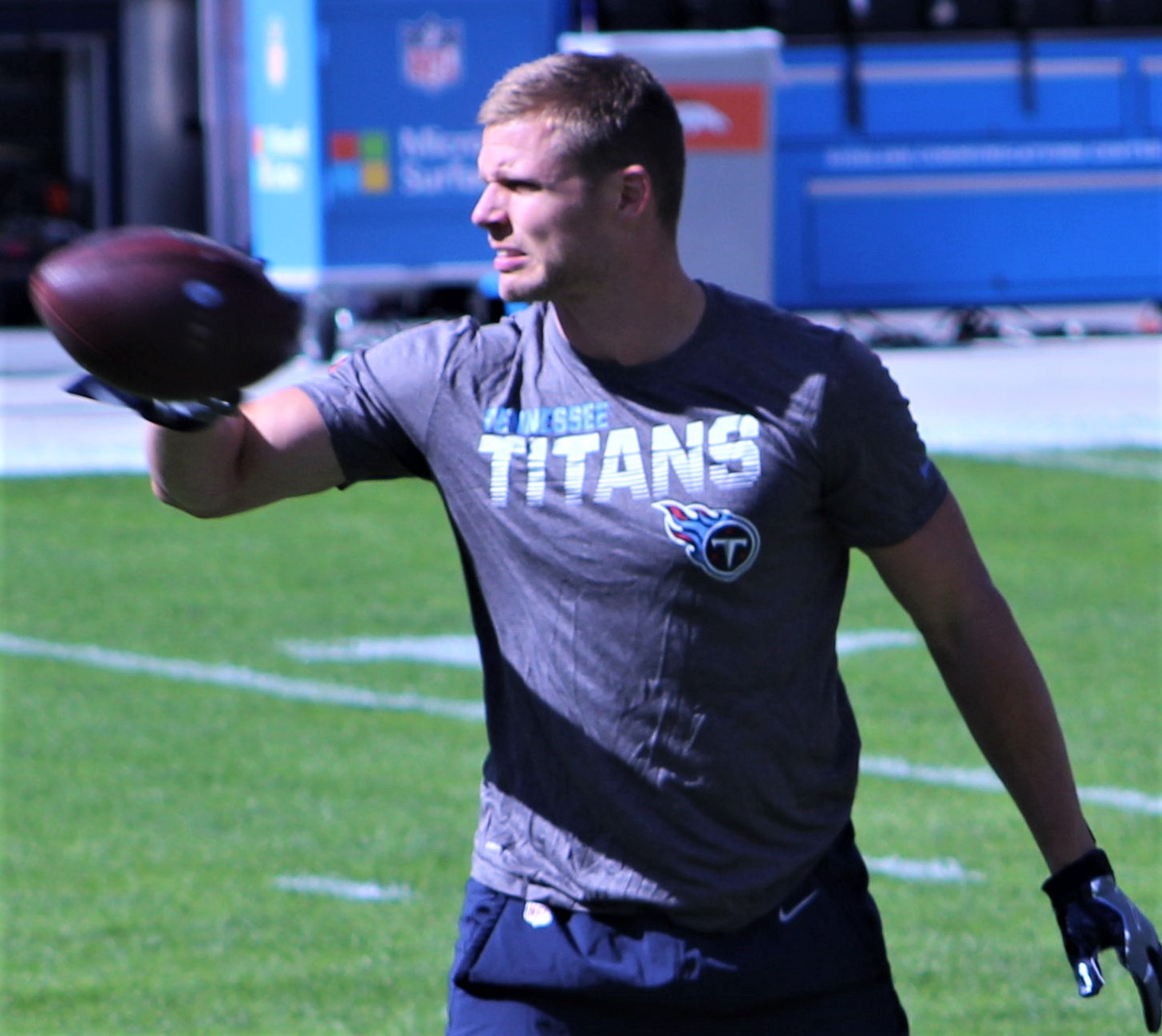
Humphries in 2019

On March 14, 2019, Humphries signed a four-year, $36 million contract with the Tennessee Titans.

During a Week 10 35–32 victory over the Kansas City Chiefs, Humphries caught his first touchdown of the season on a 23-yard reception from Ryan Tannehill, which proved to be the game-winner. Three weeks later against the Indianapolis Colts, Humphries caught his second touchdown of the season on a 13-yard reception in the 31–17 road victory. Humphries did not play in the last four games of the regular season due to an ankle injury.

Humphries finished the 2019 season with 37 receptions for 374 yards and two touchdowns in 12 games and three starts. He returned from injury in the AFC Championship Game against the Chiefs and finished the 35–24 road loss with four receptions for 25 yards.

==== 2020 season ====
During Week 2 against the Jacksonville Jaguars, Humphries caught six passes for 48 yards and his first touchdown of the season in the 33–30 victory. On October 2, 2020, Humphries was placed on the reserve/COVID-19 list. He was activated on October 14. During a Week 6 42–36 overtime victory over the Houston Texans, Humphries had six receptions for a season-high 64 yards and a touchdown. Two weeks later against the Cincinnati Bengals, he left the eventual 31–20 road loss at halftime due to a concussion and missed the next four games as a result.

On December 8, 2020, Humphries was placed on injured reserve due to the lingering concussion. He finished the 2020 season with 23 receptions for 228 yards and two touchdowns in seven games and one start. Without Humphries, the Titans finished atop the AFC South with an 11–5 record and lost to the Baltimore Ravens in the Wild Card Round by a score of 20–13.

Humphries was released by the Titans on February 25, 2021.

=== Washington Football Team ===
Humphries signed with the Washington Football Team on March 25, 2021.

Humphries made his Washington debut in the season opener against the Chargers and finished the 20–16 loss with two receptions for 10 yards. During Week 5 against the Saints, Humphries had three receptions for a season-high 73 yards in the 33–22 loss.

Humphries finished the 2021 season with 41 receptions for 383 yards in 17 games and 11 starts.

=== 2022 offseason ===
The San Francisco 49ers hosted Humphries for a workout on October 31, 2022. He also worked out for the New York Giants on November 28. The Giants hosted Humphries again for another workout on January 10, 2023.

=== Houston Texans ===
On August 13, 2023, Humphries signed with the Houston Texans. He was released on August 29.

== Career statistics ==
=== NFL ===
==== Regular season ====
Year	Team	Games		Receiving					Rushing					Returning					Fumbles	
Year	Team	GP	GS	Rec	Yds	Avg	Lng	TD	Att	Yds	Avg	Lng	TD	Ret	Yds	Avg	Lng	TD	Fum	Lost
2015	TB	13	0	27	260	9.6	27	1	0	0	0.0	0	0	0	0	0	0	0	0	0
2016	TB	15	4	55	622	11.3	42	2	5	18	3.6	8	0	28	284	10.1	25	0	3	0
2017	TB	16	3	61	631	10.3	43	1	1	6	6.0	6	0	6	49	8.1	19	0	1	1
2018	TB	16	10	76	816	10.7	51	5	2	11	5.5	7	0	23	156	6.8	16	0	2	0
2019	TEN	12	3	37	374	10.1	30	2	1	1	1.0	1	0	12	78	6.5	21	0	1	0
2020	TEN	7	1	23	228	9.9	23	2	0	0	0.0	0	0	0	0	0.0	0	0	0	0
2021	WAS	17	11	41	383	9.3	27	0	0	0	0.0	0	0	0	0	0.0	0	0	0	0
Career		96	32	320	3,314	10.2	51	13	9	36	4.0	8	0	69	567	8.2	25	0	7	1

==== Postseason ====
Year	Team	Games		Receiving					Rushing					Returning					Fumbles	
Year	Team	GP	GS	Rec	Yds	Avg	Lng	TD	Att	Yds	Avg	Lng	TD	Ret	Yds	Avg	Lng	TD	Fum	Lost
2019	TEN	1	0	4	25	6.3	9	0	0	0	0.0	0	0	0	0	0.0	0	0	0	0
2020	TEN	0	0	Did not play due to injury																
Career		1	0	4	25	6.3	9	0	0	0	0.0	0	0	0	0	0.0	0	0	0	0

=== College ===
Year	Team	GP	Receiving			
Year	Team	GP	Rec	Yds	Avg	TD
2011	Clemson	14	15	130	8.7	0
2012	Clemson	13	41	280	6.8	1
2013	Clemson	12	41	483	11.8	2
2014	Clemson	13	30	204	6.8	0
Career		52	127	1,097	8.6	3
