= Ruskell =

Ruskell is a surname. Notable people with this surname include:

- Mark Ruskell (born 1972), Scottish politician
- Tim Ruskell (born 1956), American football executive
