= Smith's Tavern =

Historic tavern in South Carolina, United States

- U.S. National Register of Historic Places
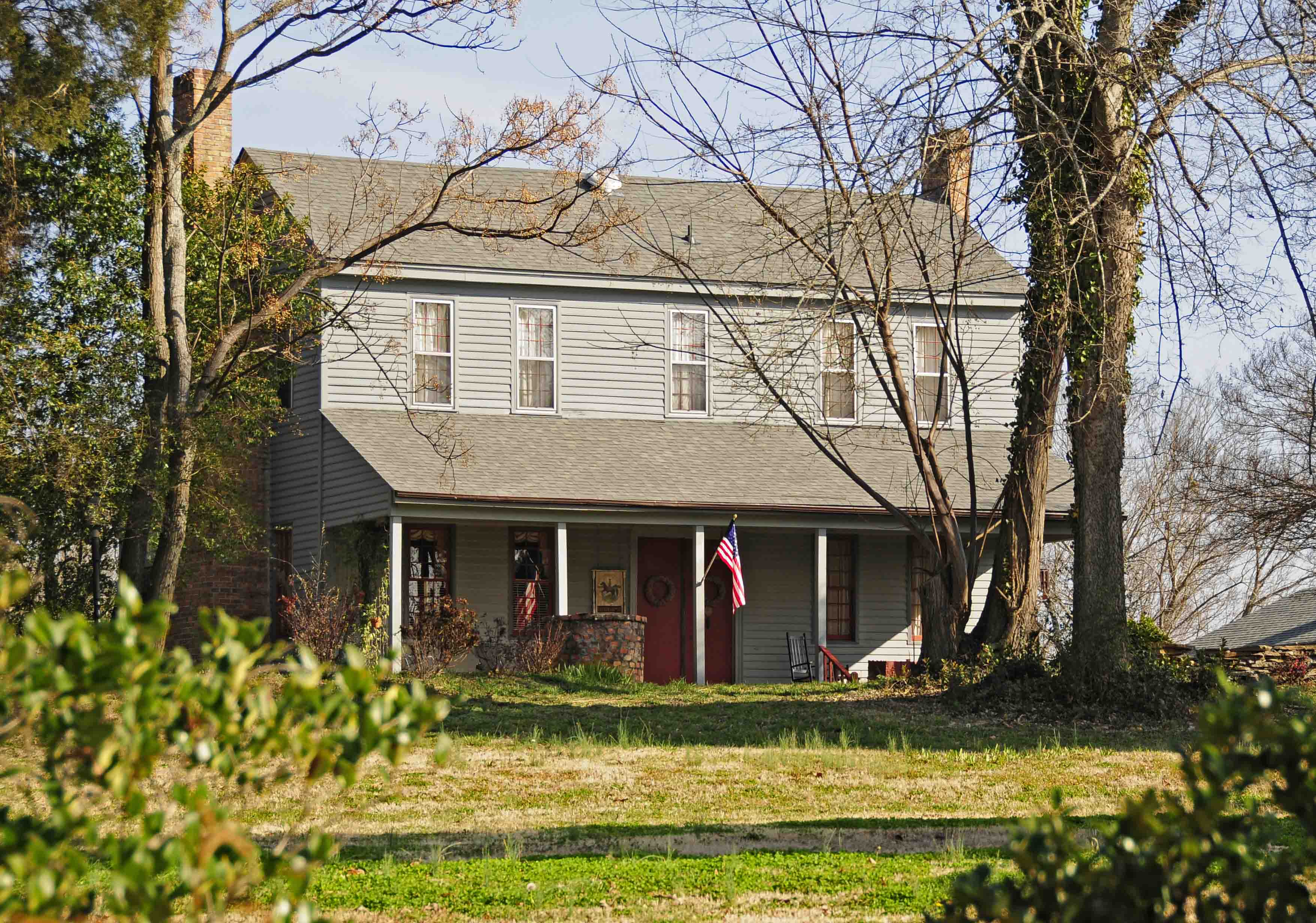

- Location within South Carolina Location within the United States
- Nearest city: Roebuck, South Carolina
- Coordinates: 34°51′38″N 81°56′47″W
- Area: 4.3 acres (1.7 ha)
- Built: 1790
- NRHP reference No.: 74001878
- Added to NRHP: July 23, 1974

Smith's Tavern is a historic building in Spartanburg County, South Carolina. It was listed on the National Register of Historic Places in 1975.

== History ==
It is a two-story clapboard "I-house" with a shed-roof porch at the front and a one-story kitchen addition to the rear. The house has two corbelled gable end chimneys and a large chimney at the rear of the old kitchen addition. The brick courses in one of the gable-end chimneys are laid in a diamond patterned tapestry, offset by glazed headers. The tapestried chimney is one of few remaining in South Carolina.

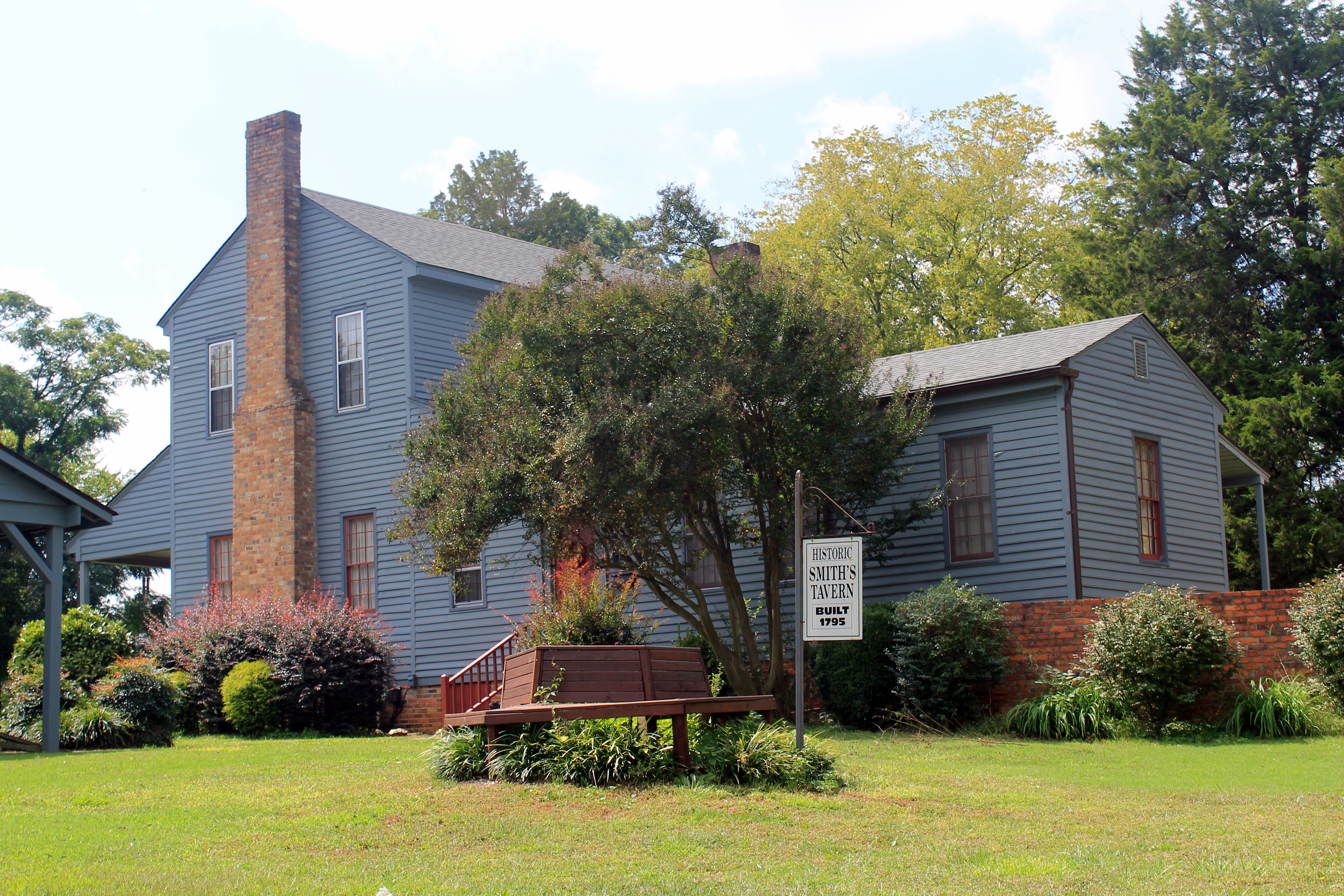
Smith's Tavern Roebuck SC

Captain William James Smith, a revolutionary army officer from Pennsylvania, built the home in 1790. It served as a stagecoach stops that offered room and board and was referred to as "Smith's Tavern." It overlooks two 18th-century roads. One of these roads is Blackstock Road, now known as Hwy. 215, was a primary route to drive cattle from Columbia, South Carolina to Asheville, North Carolina, hence its name. The other road intersected Blackstock Road is now known as McAbee and Otts Shoals Roads. The southernmost road, Otts Shoals, leads to the historic plantation of Walnut Grove, site of a revolutionary skirmish.

The land around the "Smith's Tavern" house was bought in 1970 by the Crescent Company, and it was divided into lots and the lots were sold.
