= Kevin Anderson (American football) =

American football player (born 1994)

Profile
- Position: Quarterback

Personal information
- Born: September 14, 1994 (age 32); Boca Raton, Florida, U.S.
- Listed height: 6 ft 2 in (1.88 m)
- Listed weight: 215 lb (98 kg)

Career information
- High school: Boca Raton
- College: Marshall (2013); Fordham (2014–2017)
- NFL draft: 2018: undrafted

Career history
- Orlando Apollos (2019); Winnipeg Blue Bombers (2019)*; Ottawa Redblacks (2019–2020)*; TSL Conquerors (2021); Arlington Renegades (2023)
- * Offseason or practice squad member only

Awards and highlights
- XFL champion (2023); All-Patriot League (2016)

Kevin Anderson (born September 14, 1994) is an American former football quarterback. He played college football for the Marshall Thundering Herd before transferring to the Fordham Rams. He has been a member of the Orlando Apollos of the Alliance of American Football (AAF), the Winnipeg Blue Bombers and Ottawa Redblacks of the Canadian Football League (CFL), and the Arlington Renegades of the XFL. He has also been a member of The Spring League's (TSL) 2021 season, where he led the Conquerors to finish as North Division runner-ups.

While at Fordham, Anderson finished his career top-ten in touchdown passes, completions, completion percentage, and passing yards.

== Early life ==
Anderson was born on September 14, 1994, in Boca Raton, Florida. He attended Boca Raton Community High School in Boca Raton. As a junior, he completed 123 of 254 pass attempts for 1,712 yards, eleven touchdowns, and nine interceptions. On the ground that year he ran 59 times for 107 yards and three touchdowns. As a senior he completed forty of 81 pass attempts for 509 yards, five touchdowns, and two interceptions before suffering a season-ending broken collarbone. He committed to Marshall University over FCS schools like Illinois State University and Jacksonville State University.

College recruiting
Name	Hometown	School	Height	Weight	Commit date
Kevin Anderson; QB	Boca Raton, FL	Boca Raton Community High School	6 ft 2 in (1.88 m)	195 lb (88 kg)	Jul 28, 2012
Kevin Anderson; QB	Recruit ratings: Scout: Rivals: 247Sports: ESPN:				
Overall recruit ranking: 247Sports: 1,570
Note: In many cases, Scout, Rivals, 247Sports, On3, and ESPN may conflict in their listings of height and weight.; In these cases, the average was taken. ESPN grades are on a 100-point scale.; Sources: "2013 Team Ranking". Rivals.com.

== College career ==
=== Marshall ===
In 2013, Anderson hoped to battle for Marshall's backup spot, but by the Green/White Game Anderson had fallen to the fourth-string spot on the depth chart behind Gunnar Holcombe, Cole Garvin, and the starter Rakeem Cato whom he was competing with during the spring practices. After former James Madison quarterback Michael Birdsong announced his intent to transfer to Marshall and commitment from Chase Litton, Anderson announced he would transfer to Fordham University after not playing a single snap for the Thundering Herd.

=== Fordham ===
In 2014, Anderson appeared in four games for the Rams, only recording a stat against Georgetown. He rushed for a five-yard score to finish off the team's 52–7 win.

In 2015, Anderson started all twelve games for the Rams. He went 229 of 342 for 3,183 yards and 32 touchdowns. He also ran 158 times for 341 yards and a touchdown. He led the Patriot League in passing touchdowns, completion percentage, was second in the Patriot League in total offense per game and passing yards per game. He made his first collegiate start against Army where he went fifteen of 23 for 322 yards and a rushing touchdown in a 37–35 win. In a game against Columbia, Anderson would go 22 of thirty for 330 yards and a career high five touchdown passes in a 44–24 win to secure the Liberty Cup. After the game he would be named Patriot League Offensive Player of the Week, he would win another Offensive Player of the Week honors after throwing for five touchdowns again the next week against Monmouth. The team would go 9–3 on the season, including a playoff run where they would face Chattanooga. In that game Anderson would go 26 of forty for 329 yards and three touchdowns in a 20–50 losing effort to the Mocs.

In 2016, Anderson started ten games for the Rams. He went 201 of 325 for 2,724 yards and 27 touchdowns. He also ran for 255 yards and two scores. He once again led the Patriot League in touchdowns and was tenth in the FCS. He helped lead the Rams to be ranked twelfth in passing yards per game, tenth in total offense per game, and was seventh in the country in points responsible for per game. All of those marks were good enough to lead the Patriot League. In the season opener against Navy where he went 26 of 45 for 302 yards and one touchdown in the 16–52 loss. He had a career high 426 passing yards on 28 completions in 34 attempts against Holy Cross in a 54–14 win in the second to last game of the season for the Ram–Crusader Cup. In an 83–21 win over Elizabeth City State he went 18 of 28 for 225 yards and four touchdowns. He had a career high five touchdown passes on twelve completions on eighteen attempts for 270 yards against Yale in a 44–37 nonleague win. Following that game Anderson was named Patriot League Offensive Player of the Week. The team finished the year 8–3 (5–1 in Patriot League), just missing out on a playoff appearance.

=== College statistics ===
Year	Team	Games		Passing								Rushing			
Year	Team	GP	Record	Comp	Att	Pct	Yards	Avg	TD	Int	Rate	Att	Yards	Avg	TD
2013	Marshall	DNP													
2014	Fordham	3	0–0	0	0	0.0	0	0	0	0	0.0	1	5	5.0	1
2015	Fordham	12	9–3	229	342	67.0	3,183	9.3	32	10	170.2	158	341	2.2	1
2016	Fordham	10	7–3	201	325	61.8	2,724	8.4	27	4	157.2	97	255	2.6	2
2017	Fordham	8	2–6	150	245	61.2	1,756	7.2	14	4	137.0	25	74	3.0	1
Career		33	18−12	580	912	63.6	7,663	8.4	73	18	156.6	281	675	2.4	5

=== Fordham records ===
Is top 12 in the following Fordham records:
Career records

- Tied-14th career 100-yard rushing games: 1
- 3rd career 300-yard passing games: 9
- 2nd career 200-yard passing games: 22
- 4th career passing attempts: 912
- 3rd in career passing completions: 580
- 2nd career completion percentage: 63.6%
- 3rd career passing yards: 7,663
- 1st career passing touchdowns: 73

Season records

- 12th passing attempts in a season: 342 (2015)
- Tied-8th pass completions in a season: 229 (2015)
- 2nd completion percentage in a season: 67.0% (2015)
- 10th completion percentage in a season: 61.8% (2016)
- 11th completion percentage in a season: 61.2% (2017)
- 4th passing yards in a season: 3,183 (2015)
- 8th passing yards in a season: 2,724 (2016)
- 2nd touchdown passes in a season: 32 (2015)
- Tied-4th touchdown passes in a season: 27 (2016)

Single game records

- 3rd total passing yards in a game: 426 (2016)
- Tied-6th longest completion in a game: 87 (2015)

== Professional career ==
=== Orlando Apollos ===
In 2019, Anderson was drafted by the Orlando Apollos of the Alliance of American Football (AAF) in the AAF quarterback draft behind Garrett Gilbert, Stephen Morris, and Austin Appleby. He did not start any games for the Apollos but was named as an unofficial champion when the league suspended operations prior to the end of the season.

=== Winnipeg Blue Bombers ===
On August 28, 2019, Anderson was signed by the Winnipeg Blue Bombers of the Canadian Football League (CFL). He was released by the Blue Bombers on September 18.

=== Ottawa Redblacks ===
On December 21, 2019, Anderson was signed by the Ottawa Redblacks. Following the cancelation of the 2020 season, he was released on August 31, 2020.

=== TSL Conquerors ===
On October 29, 2020, Anderson signed with the Conquerors of The Spring League (TSL). With the Conquerors, he went 59 of 103 for 682 yards, five touchdowns to no interceptions. In a 34–7 win over the Aviators, Anderson went twelve of seventeen for 171 yards and one touchdown, including a 36 yard pass to Vinny Papale. During his time with the Conquerors he split time with Brandon Silvers. The team finished second in the North Division as they went 4–2.

=== Arlington Renegades ===
On November 17, 2022, Anderson was assigned to the Arlington Renegades of the XFL following the 2023 XFL draft. He joined Drew Plitt and Kyle Sloter. On May 13, 2023, the Renegades defeated the DC Defenders in the 2023 XFL Championship Game. He was not part of the roster after the 2024 UFL dispersal draft on January 15, 2024.

=== Professional statistics ===
Year	Team	League	Games		Passing								Rushing			
Year	Team	League	GP	GS	Cmp	Att	Pct	Yds	Y/A	TD	Int	Rtg	Att	Yds	Avg	TD
2019	ORL	AAF	4	0	0	1	0.0	0	0.0	0	0	39.6	3	19	6.3	0
2019	WIN	CFL	DNP													
2019	OTT	CFL	DNP													
2020	OTT	CFL	DNP													
2021	CON	TSL	–	–	59	103	57.3	682	6.6	5	0	93.6	11	30	2.7	0
2023	ARL	XFL	1	0	1	1	100.0	5	5.0	0	0	87.5	0	0	0.0	0
Career			4	0	59	104	57.3	692	6.6	5	0	93.6	14	49	4.1	0

== Personal life ==
Beginning when Anderson was in eighth grade he worked with former Marshall quarterback Eric Kresser.
