= Kate Barry =

American revolutionary heroine (1752–1823)

- Born: Margaret Catherine Moore; November 29, 1752; County Antrim, Ireland (Note: Claghorn states that she was born in North Carolina. Maldano states that she was born in Ireland, and sources that state that she was born in South Carolina are in error.)
- Died: September 29, 1823 (aged 70)
- Known for: Scout and guide during the American Revolutionary War
- Spouse: Andrew Barry
- Children: 11
- Parent(s): Charles and Mary Moore

Margaret Catherine Moore Barry (November 29, 1752 – September 29, 1823) operated as a scout and guide for Brigadier General Daniel Morgan during the American Revolutionary War. Morgan learned that General Charles Cornwallis was preparing for a battle against the American patriots. With 600 soldiers, the patriots would be outnumbered by 1,000 British and loyalist soldiers. Morgan sent Barry on a mission to assemble more patriot soldiers. She rode through the South Carolina backcountry to rally the militia, recruits, and South Carolina Rangers that brought the American forces to 1,600 men. She was named "heroine of Cowpens" for significantly increasing the number of soldiers that led to the victory of the Battle of Cowpens (January 17, 1781). Her husband, Andrew Barry, and her brother, Thomas Moore, served with distinction during the battle.

== Personal life ==
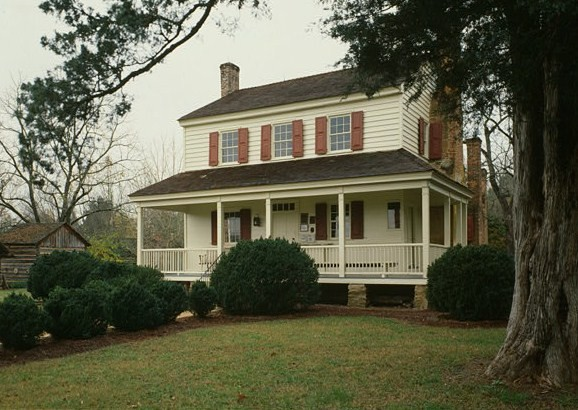
Walnut Grove Manor, Barry's family house, Walnut Grove Plantation, Spartanburg County, South Carolina

Margaret Catherine Moore, born in County Antrim, Ireland, on November 29, 1752, was the eldest child of Charles and Mary Moore. She had nine younger siblings. The Moores immigrated to the American colonies in 1763, after which King George III awarded Charles and Mary a land grant that year. Over time, their property grew to the 3,600-acre Walnut Grove Plantation in Spartanburg County, South Carolina. Crops were planted and harvested by family members and enslaved laborers. They were slaveholders to a dozen people.

Catherine, known as Kate, married Andrew Barry (ca. 1744 – 1811) in 1767 at the age of 15, becoming Catherine Moore Barry. The Barrys, who had eleven children, lived at the Walnut Grove Plantation, in the Backcountry of South Carolina.

The Barrys settled in the South Carolina frontier and were subject to periodic conflicts with Native people who had lived in the area for centuries. Sometimes families were killed. If there was news of an imminent attack, Barry and an enslaved man at her plantation warned women and children to seek shelter at Fort Prince or Fort Nicholas, or Nichol's Fort.

== Revolutionary War ==
During the Revolutionary War, she guided patriot soldiers through the Piedmont area of South Carolina. She knew backcountry trails and shortcuts.

Charles Cornwallis prepared for a battle of his 1,100 British soldiers to fight against the American patriots with just 600 soldiers. Brigadier General Daniel Morgan kept ahead of the British and loyalist soldiers while Barry mustered more men for the fight. Barry, a scout for Morgan, was sent to assemble men for the militia and soldiers who had fought and lost at the Battles of Camden (August 16, 1780) and Waxhaws (May 29, 1780) in preparation for the Battle of Cowpens (January 17, 1781). She brought the South Carolina Rangers to Morgan, which helped ensure victory. Barry rode horseback to sound the alarm of the coming battle to her neighbors.

By the day of the battle, Barry increased the ranks from 600 to 1,600 patriot soldiers. She was instrumental in warning the militia of the coming British before the battle. The Battle of Cowpens was a decisive victory for General Morgan. She was given the name "heroine of Cowpens" for her dangerous mission. Her husband Andrew, captain of the South Carolina Partisan Rangers, and her brother Thomas Moore fought with distinction in the battle. Andrew was wounded the previous year at the Battle of Musgrove Mill (August 19, 1780).

It was a turning point in the reconquest of South Carolina from the British. Her warning helped to prepare the colonial forces to defeat the British commander, Cornwallis and his men and drive them north, out of the state of South Carolina.

Barry rode from the plantation to warn others about the presence of local Tories in the area when they captured her. They tried to get her to tell them her husband's located. Andrew served under Major Henry White and Colonel John Thomas, Jr. as a captain in the militia. Reportedly, she was tied up to a tree and struck with a lash three times when she would not provide the information.

== Death and legacy ==
She died on September 29, 1823, and is buried in Walnut Grove Plantation cemetery beside her husband, Andrew, who was one of the elders of the Nazareth Presbyterian Church.

The Kate Barry chapter of South Carolina of the Daughters of the American Revolution was established in her name. A historical marker was installed at the intersection of State Highway 196 and U.S. 221 in Moore, South Carolina, in 1968 by the Battle of Cowpens Chapter, NS Daughters of the American Revolution, which states,

Katy Barry 1½ miles SE is Walnut Grove, home of Margaret Catherine Moore Barry (1752–1823). Local tradition says she was known as "Kate Barry" and acted as a scout for the Patriots before the Battle of Cowpens, January 17, 1781. With her parents, and her husband, Captain Andrew Barry, she lies buried in the plantation cemetery.

Barry was called "a prototype of those who fought for the Cause of Liberty" in the poem "Kate Barry's Famous Ride" by H. R. Wilkins.
