= Orlando Apollos =

Professional American football team playing in the AAF

Logo

General information
- Founded: 2018
- Folded: 2019
- Colors: Navy blue, dark orange & bright orange

Personnel
- Head coach: Steve Spurrier
- President: Michael P. Waddell

Team history
- Orlando Apollos (2019)

Home fields
- Spectrum Stadium (2019)

League / conference affiliations
- Alliance of American Football: Eastern Conference (2019)

The Orlando Apollos were a professional American football franchise based in Orlando, Florida, and one of the eight members of the Alliance of American Football (AAF), which began play in February 2019. The team played its home games at Spectrum Stadium on the campus of the University of Central Florida. They were coached by Heisman Trophy winner and former college and National Football League (NFL) head coach Steve Spurrier. NFL front office veteran Tim Ruskell was the general manager and longtime college athletics executive Michael P. Waddell was the team president.

The team's name was inspired by the Greek god Apollo, and his and Florida's connections to the Sun, while the team's colors of orange and navy were tributes to Florida's sunshine and the Apollo program, respectively. The team's helmets depicted Apollo, who is commonly pictured as an archer, shooting a bow-and-arrow.

On April 2, 2019, the league's football operations were reportedly suspended, and on April 4 the league allowed players to leave their contracts to sign with NFL teams. The league filed for Chapter 7 bankruptcy on April 17, 2019.

== History ==
On April 7, 2018, Orlando was announced as the first Alliance team along with its coach, Steve Spurrier. On September 20, the league announced four inaugural eastern franchises' names and logos including the Orlando Apollos. On December 4, 2018, the team and iHeart Media announced its broadcasting arrangements.

The final 52-man roster was set on January 30, 2019. The team's first game was at home, Spectrum Stadium, against the Atlanta Legends on February 9, 2019, where they won 40–6.

On February 20, 2019, the league announced that due to Florida worker's compensation laws, the Apollos had moved its practices to Camden County High School in Kingsland, Georgia, with players being housed at hotels in Jacksonville, Florida, and commuting to home games in Orlando. The AAF was unable to secure a league-wide insurance plan prior to the start of the season, and while the state of Georgia will arrange worker's compensation insurance for any business, including professional sports where the majority of practices are held in the state, Florida does not classify professional athletes as employees.

The Apollos began play on February 9, winning their first game in blowout fashion, defeating the Atlanta Legends at Spectrum Stadium, 40–6. They would follow the opening win up with another high-scoring effort on the road, defeating the San Antonio Commanders, 37–29. They would win their first five games, and were the AAF's last undefeated team in the inaugural season before losing to the Arizona Hotshots on March 16, 22–17. However, they bounced back the next week by beating the Atlanta Legends, 36–6, to become the first team in the inaugural season to qualify for the playoffs.

After the league's suspension of football operations, head coach Spurrier, by virtue of the team's league-leading record, stated, "we’ve got to be the champs, right?" FanDuel Sportsbook declared the Apollos "honorary champions", while paying out futures bets placed on all AAF teams.

== Final roster ==
2019 Orlando Apollos final roster
Quarterbacks: 4 Kevin Anderson; 5 Austin Appleby; 3 Garrett Gilbert; Running backs: 32 Ryan Green; 25 Akeem Hunt; 22 D'Ernest Johnson; 24 De'Veon Smith; Wide receivers: 11 Donteea Dye; 16 Rannell Hall; 13 Ishmael Hyman; 12 Charles Johnson; 17 Jalin Marshall; 15 Willie Quinn; 14 Chris Thompson; Tight ends: 83 Scott Orndoff; 80 Sean Price; 89 Matt Weiser	Offensive linemen: 70 Quinterrius Eatmon T; 66 Aaron Evans T; 63 Tre' Jackson G; 74 Marquis Lucas G/T; 77 Chris Martin T/G; 64 Jordan McCray C; 71 Ronald Patrick G/C; 75 Andrew Tiller G; Defensive linemen: 92 Josh Banks DE; 97 Izaah Burks DE; 90 Tony Guerad NT; 98 Anthony Moten DE; 99 Giorgio Newberry DE; 93 Leon Orr NT; 91 Jerel Worthy DE	Linebackers: 55 Andrew Ankrah OLB; 58 Christian French OLB; 51 Terence Garvin ILB; 52 Reggie Northrup ILB; 59 Earl Okine OLB; 50 Terrance Parks ILB; Defensive backs: 28 Bryce Canady FS; 21 Jerome Couplin SS; 26 Josh Evans SS; 37 LaDarius Gunter CB; 33 Will Hill FS; 23 Mark Myers CB; 30 Deji Olatoye CB; 29 Keith Reaser CB; 20 Cody Riggs CB; 27 Marquez White CB; Special teams: 44 Tanner Carew LS; 2 Elliott Fry K; 1 Ben Turk P	Reserve lists: 95 Ryan Davis DE (IR); -- Ronald Powell 0LB (IR); -- Jacob Pugh OLB (IR); -- Matt Sewall WR (IR); -- Kellen Soulek NT (IR); Rights list: Kareem Are G; Terrance Plummer LB; 51 Active, 7 Inactive

=== Allocation pool ===
The team's assigned area, which designates player rights, includes the following:

Colleges

- Bethune-Cookman
- Florida
- Florida A&M
- Florida Atlantic
- Florida International
- Florida State
- Florida Tech
- Jacksonville
- Miami (FL)
- Stetson
- South Florida
- UCF
- West Florida

National Football League (NFL)

- Miami Dolphins
- New York Giants
- New York Jets
- Tampa Bay Buccaneers

Canadian Football League (CFL)

- Hamilton Tiger-Cats

== Staff ==
Orlando Apollos staff
Front office: General manager – Tim Ruskell; Head coaches: Head coach – Steve Spurrier; Offensive coaches: Quarterbacks/running backs – David Reaves; Wide receivers – Willie Jackson; Tight ends – Scott Spurrier; Offensive line – Jimmy Ray Stephens; Offensive Assistant/Qbs- Seth Strickland	Defensive coaches: Defensive coordinator – Bob Sanders; Defensive line – Jim Jeffcoat; Defensive backs – Donnie Abraham; Defensive backs – Nick Rapone; Safeties – Lito Sheppard; Special teams coaches: Special teams coordinator/Running backs – Todd Washington

== 2019 season ==
2019 Orlando Apollos season
- General manager: Tim Ruskell
- Head coach: Steve Spurrier
- Home stadium: Spectrum Stadium

Results
- Record: 7–1
- League place: 1st, Eastern Conference

=== Final standings ===
2019 Alliance of American Football standings
Eastern Conference
Club	W–L	PCT	CONF	PF	PA	DIFF	SOS	SOV	STK
Orlando Apollos	7–1	.875	5–0	236	136	100	.406	.375	W2
Birmingham Iron	5–3	.625	3–2	165	133	32	.406	.300	W1
Memphis Express	2–6	.250	1–4	152	194	-42	.578	.500	L1
Atlanta Legends	2–6	.250	1–4	88	213	-125	.609	.438	L3
Western Conference
Club	W–L	PCT	CONF	PF	PA	DIFF	SOS	SOV	STK
San Antonio Commanders	5–3	.625	3–2	158	154	4	.516	.450	L1
Arizona Hotshots	5–3	.625	3–2	186	144	42	.469	.500	W3
San Diego Fleet	3–5	.375	2–3	158	161	-3	.469	.417	L3
Salt Lake Stallions	3–5	.375	2–3	135	143	-8	.547	.417	W1

=== Schedule ===
==== Preseason ====
Round	Date	Opponent	Result	Record	Venue
–	January 27	at San Diego Fleet	W 31–28	1–0	Alamodome

==== Regular season ====
Round	Date	Opponent	Result	Record	Venue	Attendance
1	February 9	Atlanta Legends	W 40–6	1–0	Spectrum Stadium	20,191
2	February 17	at San Antonio Commanders	W 37–29	2–0	Alamodome	29,176
3	February 23	Memphis Express	W 21–17	3–0	Spectrum Stadium	20,394
4	March 2	at Salt Lake Stallions	W 20–11	4–0	Rice–Eccles Stadium	9,302
5	March 9	at Birmingham Iron	W 31–14	5–0	Legion Field	13,310
6	March 16	Arizona Hotshots	L 17–22	5–1	Spectrum Stadium	18,358
7	March 23	at Atlanta Legends	W 36–6	6–1	Georgia State Stadium	11,416
8	March 30	at Memphis Express	W 34–31	7–1	Liberty Bowl Memorial Stadium	12,417
9	April 6	San Diego Fleet	Not played		Spectrum Stadium	
10	April 14	Birmingham Iron	Not played		Spectrum Stadium	

==== Postseason ====
Round	Date	Opponent	Result	Record	Venue
Semi	April 21	Birmingham Iron	Not played		Spectrum Stadium

=== Game summaries ===
==== Week 1: Atlanta ====
Week One: Atlanta Legends at Orlando Apollos – Game summary

Quarter	1	2	3	4	Total
Legends	3	3	0	0	6
Apollos	0	22	3	15	40

at Spectrum Stadium, Orlando, Florida

- Date: February 9
- Game time: 8:00 p.m. ET
- Game attendance: 20,191
- Referee: John O'Neill
- TV announcers (CBS): Andrew Catalon, Gary Danielson, and Melanie Collins
- NoExtraPoints AAF

Game information

First Quarter

- (6:10) ATL – Younghoe Koo 38-yard field goal, Legends 3–0

Second Quarter

- (14:14) ORL – Jalin Marshall 26-yard pass from Garrett Gilbert (De'Veon Smith run), Apollos 8–3
- (11:55) ORL – De'Veon Smith 1-yard run (Garrett Gilbert pass to Matt Weiser), Apollos 16–3
- (7:20) ATL – Younghoe Koo 27-yard field goal, Apollos 16–6
- (0:06) ORL – Garrett Gilbert 5-yard pass from Jalin Marshall (pass failed), Apollos 22–6

Third Quarter

- (3:22) ORL – Elliott Fry 33-yard field goal, Apollos 25–6

Fourth Quarter

- (13:25) ORL – D'Ernest Johnson 33-yard pass from Garrett Gilbert (run failed), Apollos 31–6
- (11:07) ORL – Terence Garvin 51-yard interception return (pass failed), Apollos 37–6
- (2:53) ORL – Elliott Fry 21-yard field goal, Apollos 40–6

Top Passers

- ATL – Matt Simms – 15/28, 126 yards, 2 INT
- ORL – Garrett Gilbert – 15/25, 227 yards, 2 TD

Top Rushers

- ATL – Tarean Folston – 12 carries, 32 yards
- ORL – Akeem Hunt – 10 carries, 73 yards

Top Receivers

- ATL – Seantavius Jones – 3 receptions, 43 yards
- ORL – Charles Johnson – 4 receptions, 60 yards

Top Tacklers

- ATL – Tyson Graham, 6 tackles
- ORL – Terence Garvin, 8 tackles

In a light rain, the Orlando Apollos hosted the Atlanta Legends in the first week of the Alliance of American Football. Quarterback Garrett Gilbert threw for 227 yards and two touchdown passes, and caught a touchdown pass. The Apollos dominated the game on both offense and defense. The Orlando defense compiled three sacks, and three interceptions. Terence Garvin had two of the interceptions, the second was returned 51 yards for a touchdown.

==== Week 2: at San Antonio ====
Week Two: Orlando Apollos at San Antonio Commanders – Game summary

Quarter	1	2	3	4	Total
Apollos	0	17	3	17	37
Commanders	12	6	11	0	29

at Alamodome, San Antonio, Texas

- Date: February 17
- Game time: 4:00 p.m. ET
- Game weather: Indoors
- Game attendance: 29,176
- Referee: James Carter
- TV announcers (CBS Sports Network): Ben Holden, Adam Archuleta, John Schriffen
- NoExtraPoints AAF

Game information

First Quarter

- (8:06) SA – Kenneth Farrow 15-yard rush (rush failed), Commanders 6–0
- (0:00) SA – Logan Woodside 1-yard pass to Evan Rodriguez (rush failed), Commanders 12–0

Second Quarter

- (12:52) ORL – De'Veon Smith 1-yard rush (De'Veon Smith rush), Commanders 12–8
- (8:20) SA – Nick Rose 50-yard field goal, Commanders 15–8
- (5:37) ORL – Elliott Fry 35-yard field goal, Commanders 15–11
- (1:54) ORL – Garrett Gilbert 21-yard pass to Charles Johnson (pass failed), Apollos 17–15
- (0:00) SA – Nick Rose 38-yard field goal, Commanders 18–17

Third Quarter

- (9:28) SA – Nick Rose 37-yard field goal, Commanders 21–17
- (8:10) SA – Garrett Gilbert (ORL) fumble recovered by Joey Mbu and returned 8 yards for touchdown (Logan Woodside pass to Evan Rodriguez), Commanders 29–17
- (3:12) ORL – Elliott Fry 24-yard field goal, Commanders 29–20

Fourth Quarter

- (13:51) ORL – Elliott Fry 47-yard field goal, Commanders 29–23
- (7:49) ORL – Garrett Gilbert 23-yard pass to Jalin Marshall (pass failed), Tied 29–29
- (7:02) ORL – Keith Reaser 39-yard interception return for touchdown (Garrett Gilbert pass to Rannell Hall), Apollos 37–29

Top Passers

- ORL – Garrett Gilbert – 19/28, 393 yards, 2 TD
- SA – Logan Woodside – 20/39, 223 yards, 1 TD, 1 INT

Top Rushers

- ORL – D'Ernest Johnson – 8 carries, 57 yards
- SA – Kenneth Farrow – 13 carries, 74 yards, 1 TD

Top Receivers

- ORL – Charles Johnson – 7 receptions, 192 yards, 1 TD
- SA – De'Marcus Ayers – 5 receptions, 80 yards

Top Tacklers

- ORL – Mark Myers Jr. – 6 tackles
- SA – De'Vante Bausby – 4 tackles

With the score tied 29–29 midway through the fourth quarter, Apollos linebacker Keith Reaser intercepted Commanders quarterback Logan Woodside. Reaser returned the ball 39 yards for the game-winning touchdown. Orlando beat San Antonio by the score of 37–29 to improve to 2–0 on the season.

==== Week 3: Memphis ====
Week Three: Memphis Express at Orlando Apollos – Game summary

Quarter	1	2	3	4	Total
Express	0	0	6	11	17
Apollos	9	0	6	6	21

at Spectrum Stadium, Orlando, Florida

- Date: February 23
- Game time: 8:00 p.m. ET
- Game attendance: 20,394
- Referee: Jeff Heaser
- TV announcers (NFL Network): Andrew Siciliano, Steve Mariucci, Jason Fische
- NoExtraPoints AAF

Game information

First Quarter

- (13:21) ORL – D'Ernest Johnson 4-yard rush (rush failed), Apollos 6–0
- (7:37) ORL – Elliot Fry 31-yard field goal, Apollos 9–0

Second Quarter
No scoring plays
Third Quarter

- (10:05) MEM – Zach Mettenberger 30-yard pass to Devin Lucien (pass failed), Apollos 9–6
- (6:40) ORL – Garrett Gilbert 37 yard pass to Rannell Hall (pass failed), Apollos 15–6

Fourth Quarter

- (14:11) MEM – Josh Jasper 27-yard field goal, Apollos 15–9
- (9:07) ORL – Garrett Gilbert 21-yard rush (rush failed), Apollos 21–9
- (5:40) MEM – Zach Mettenberger 40-yard pass to Gerrard Sheppard (Zach Mettenberger pass to Anthony Manzo-Lewis), Apollos 21–17

Top Passers

- MEM – Zach Mettenberger – 9/12, 120 yards, 2 TD
- ORL – Garrett Gilbert – 14/28, 207 yards, TD

Top Rushers

- MEM – Sherman Badie – 8 attempts, 59 yards
- ORL – D'Ernest Johnson – 13 attempts, 79 yards

Top Receivers

- MEM – Devin Lucien – 3 receptions, 51 yards, TD
- ORL – Rannell Hall – 4 receptions, 68 yards, TD

Top Tacklers

- MEM – Davis Tull – 4 tackles
- ORL – Andrew Ankrah – 5 tackles

A defensive battle in the first half, Orlando led Memphis 9-0 at halftime. The Apollos stretched their lead to 15–6 after a 37-yard touchdown pass from Garrett Gilbert to Rannell Hall on a 4th down & 8. Gilbert later ran for a 21-yard touchdown off a run-pass option play to go up 21–9. Though Memphis cut the lead to 21–17, Orlando put the game away with a clock-burning drive all the way to the Memphis 1 yard line. Gilbert took a knee to end the game, and Orlando improved to 3–0.

==== Week 4: at Salt Lake ====
Week Four: Orlando Apollos at Salt Lake Stallions – Game summary

Quarter	1	2	3	4	Total
Apollos	3	3	8	6	20
Stallions	0	3	8	0	11

at Rice–Eccles Stadium, Salt Lake City, Utah

- Date: March 2
- Game time: 8:00 p.m. ET
- Game weather: Snow
- Game attendance: 9,302
- Referee: Brandon Cruse
- TV announcers (NFL Network): Dan Hellie & Shaun O'Hara
- NoExtraPoints AAF

Game information

First Quarter

- (1:10) ORL – Elliott Fry 43-yard field goal, Apollos 3–0

Second Quarter

- (11:42) SL – Taylor Bertolet 36-yard field goal, Tied 3–3
- (6:10) ORL – Elliott Fry 42-yard field goal, Apollos 6–3

Third Quarter

- (6:01) ORL – Garrett Gilbert 20-yard pass to Donteea Dye (Garrett Gilbert pass to Sean Price), Apollos 14–3
- (0:27) SL – Joel Bouagnon 14-yard rush (Josh Woodrum pass to Terrell Newby), Apollos 14–11

Fourth Quarter

- (11:17) ORL – Akeem Hunt 2-yard rush (pass failed), Apollos 20–11

Top Passers

- ORL – Garrett Gilbert – 22/32, 244 yards, 1 TD
- SL – Josh Woodrum – 16/22, 161 yards

Top Rushers

- ORL – De'Veon Smith – 12 carries, 51 yards
- SL – Branden Oliver – 17 carries, 71 yards

Top Receivers

- ORL – Charles Johnson – 9 receptions, 105 yards
- SL – Adonis Jennings – 2 receptions, 43 yards

Top Tacklers

- ORL – Reggie Northrup – 5 tackles
- SL – Micah Hannemann – 7 tackles

On a snowy night in Salt Lake City, Orlando beat the Stallions 20–11 to remain unbeaten. After taking a 6–3 lead at halftime, the Apollos scored two touchdowns in the second half to secure the victory. In the third quarter, quarterback Garrett Gilbert threw a 20-yard touchdown to Donteeya Dye Jr. followed by a 2-point conversion pass from running back D’Ernest Johnson to Sean Price. In the fourth quarter, running back Akeem Hunt scored a 2-yard touchdown run.

==== Week 5: at Birmingham ====
Week Five: Orlando Apollos at Birmingham Iron – Game summary

Quarter	1	2	3	4	Total
Apollos	14	6	3	8	31
Iron	0	8	6	0	14

at Legion Field, Birmingham, Alabama

- Date: March 9
- Game time: 2:00 p.m. ET
- Game attendance: 13,310
- Referee: James Carter
- TV announcers (TNT): Mark Malone, Shaun O'Hara
- NoExtraPoints AAF

Game information

First Quarter

- (12:26) ORL – Garrett Gilbert 21-yard pass to Scott Orndoff (pass failed), Apollos 6–0
- (0:44) ORL – Keith Reaser 40-yard interception return (Garrett Gilbert pass to Charles Johnson), Apollos 14–0

Second Quarter

- (3:29) ORL – Elliott Fry 21-yard field goal, Apollos 17–0
- (1:32) BIRM – Trent Richardson 3-yard rush (Keith Price pass to Quinton Patton), Apollos 17–8
- (0:00) ORL – Elliott Fry 22-yard field goal, Apollos 20–8

Third Quarter

- (4:27) BIRM – Keith Price 30-yard pass to Brandon Ross (pass failed), Apollos 20–14
- (0:10) ORL – Elliott Fry 27-yard field goal, Apollos 23–14

Fourth Quarter

- (8:33) ORL – Garrett Gilbert 12-yard pass to Charles Johnson (Garrett Gilbert pass to Jalin Marshall), Apollos 31–14

Top Passers

- ORL – Garrett Gilbert – 23/35, 286 yards, 2 TD
- BIRM – Keith Price – 19/30, 235 yards, 1 TD

Top Rushers

- ORL – De'Veon Smith – 14 carries, 119 yards
- BIRM – Trent Richardson – 8 carries, 21 yards, 1 TD

Top Receivers

- ORL – Charles Johnson – 6 receptions, 83 yards, 1 TD
- BIRM – Wes Saxton – 3 receptions, 75 yards

Going into the game, Orlando had the best offense in the league, while Birmingham had the best defense. The Apollos, however, beat the Iron handily to improve to 5–0. Orlando put up 468 yards of offense, sacked Birmingham five times, and Keith Reaser made an interception return for a touchdown, his second of the season.

==== Week 6: Arizona ====
Week Six: Arizona Hotshots at Orlando Apollos – Game summary

Quarter	1	2	3	4	Total
Hotshots	3	11	0	8	22
Apollos	6	3	0	8	17

at Spectrum Stadium, Orlando, Florida

- Date: March 16
- Game time: 8:00 p.m. ET
- Game attendance: 18,358
- Referee: Tra Blake
- TV announcers (NFL Network): Dan Hellie, Shaun O'Hara, Jason Fisher
- NoExtraPoints AAF

Game information

First Quarter

- (8:13) ORL – Garrett Gilbert 5-yard pass to Charles Johnson (pass failed), Apollos 6–0
- (4:54) ARIZ – Nick Folk 55-yard field goal, Apollos 6–3

Second Quarter

- (14:12) ARIZ – Nick Folk 53-yard field goal, Tied 6–6
- (10:43) ORL – Elliott Fry 44-yard field goal, Apollos 9–6
- (4:32) ARIZ – John Wolford 9-yard pass to Jhurell Pressley (John Wolford rush), Hotshots 14–9

Third Quarter
No scoring plays
Fourth Quarter

- (9:45) ORL – Garrett Gilbert 17-yard pass to Jalin Marshall (Garrett Gilbert pass to Akeem Hunt), Apollos 17–14
- (5:17) ARIZ – Jhurell Pressley 1-yard rush (John Wolford pass to Marquis Bundy), Hotshots 22–17

Top Passers

- ARIZ – John Wolford – 16/27, 162 yards, 1 TD
- ORL – Garrett Gilbert – 23/48, 268 yards, 2 TD, 1 INT

Top Rushers

- ARIZ – Tim Cook – 11 carries, 71 yards
- ORL – D'Ernest Johnson – 9 carries, 43 yards

Top Receivers

- ARIZ – Richard Mullaney – 6 receptions, 73 yards
- ORL – Jalin Marshall – 6 receptions, 98 yards, 1 TD

Orlando suffered their first loss of the season against the Arizona Hotshots. Trailing 22–17 with 55 second remaining, the Apollos fielded a punt, and took over at their own 18 yard line. With no timeouts left, Garrett Gilbert threw a 48-yard pass to a wide open Sean Price. At the Hotshots 34 yard line, Gilbert spiked the ball to stop the clock. He then threw a 26-yard completion to Jalin Marshall to the 8 yard line with less than 10 seconds left in regulation. But as the team was scrambling to line up and spike the ball, the Apollos were penalized for a false start. A ten-second runoff was administered, and the game clock expired.

==== Week 7: at Atlanta ====
Week Seven: Orlando Apollos at Atlanta Legends – Game summary

Quarter	1	2	3	4	Total
Apollos	8	6	14	8	36
Legends	0	6	0	0	6

at Georgia State Stadium, Atlanta, Georgia

- Date: March 23
- Game time: 2:00 p.m. ET
- Game attendance: 11,416
- Referee: Brandon Cruse
- TV announcers (TNT): Mark Malone, Marvin Lewis
- NoExtraPoints AAF

Game information

First Quarter

- (8:18) ORL – De'Veon Smith 1-yard rush (De'Veon Smith rush), Apollos 8–0

Second Quarter

- (14:54) ATL – Aaron Murray 8-yard pass to Malachi Jones (rush failed), Apollos 8–6
- (6:31) ORL – De'Veon Smith 1-yard rush (pass failed), Apollos 14–6

Third Quarter

- (10:33) ORL – De'Veon Smith 4-yard rush (pass failed), Apollos 20–6
- (6:54) ORL – Deji Olatoye 65-yard interception return (Garrett Gilbert rush), Apollos 28–6

Fourth Quarter

- (9:57) ORL – Garrett Gilbert 7-yard pass to Charles Johnson (D'Ernest Johnson rush), Apollos 36–6

Top Passers

- ORL – Garrett Gilbert – 19/23, 217 yards, 1 TD
- ATL – Aaron Murray – 16/22, 135 yards, 1 TD, 2 INT

Top Rushers

- ORL – D'Ernest Johnson – 7 receptions, 54 yards
- ATL – Tarean Folston – 8 carries, 37 yards

Top Receivers

- ORL – Rannell Hall – 2 receptions, 60 yards
- ATL – Malachi Jones – 6 receptions, 53 yards, 1 TD

Garrett Gilbert threw for 217 yards and one touchdown pass as Orlando routed Atlanta by the score of 36–6. With the win, the Apollos improved to 6–1 and became the first team to clinch a playoff berth.

==== Week 8: at Memphis ====
Week Eight: Orlando Apollos at Memphis Express – Game summary

Quarter	1	2	3	4	Total
Apollos	3	11	8	12	34
Express	0	9	14	8	31

at Liberty Bowl Memorial Stadium, Memphis, Tennessee

- Date: March 30
- Game time: 2:00 p.m. ET
- Game attendance: 12,417
- Referee: Reggie Smith
- TV announcers (TNT): Dan Hellie, Brock Huard
- NoExtraPoints AAF

Game information

First Quarter

- (9:30) ORL – Elliott Fry 25-yard field goal, Apollos 3–0

Second Quarter

- (12:52) ORL – Elliott Fry 37-yard field goal, Apollos 6–0
- (8:45) MEM – Austin MacGinnis 51-yard field goal, Apollos 6–3
- (6:55) MEM – Austin MacGinnis 29-yard field goal, Tied 6–6
- (1:55) ORL – D'Ernest Johnson 3-yard rush (D'Ernest Johnson rush), Apollos 14–6
- (0:09) MEM – Austin MacGinnis 34-yard field goal, Apollos 14–9

Third Quarter

- (13:54) ORL – Garrett Gilbert 65-yard pass to Donteea Dye (Garrett Gilbert pass to Chris Thompson), Apollos 22–9
- (8:13) MEM – Terrence Magee 2-yard rush (Brandon Silvers pass to Dontez Byrd), Apollos 22–17
- (2:36) MEM – Cory Crawford 7-yard fumble return (pass failed), Express 23–22

Fourth Quarter

- (8:23) MEM – Brandon Silvers 9-yard pass to Dontez Byrd (Garrett Gilbert pass to Gerrard Sheppard), Express 31–22
- (4:59) ORL – Garrett Gilbert 18-yard pass to Charles Johnson (pass failed), Express 31–28
- (1:51) ORL – De'Veon Smith 1-yard rush (rush failed), Apollos 34–31

Top Passers

- ORL – Garrett Gilbert – 22/40, 310 yards, 2 TD, 2 INT
- MEM – Brandon Silvers – 30/49, 269 yards, 1 TD, 1 INT

Top Rushers

- ORL – De'Veon Smith – 10 carries, 27 yards, 1 TD
- MEM – Terrence Magee – 9 carries, 39 yards, 1 TD

Top Receivers

- ORL – Charles Johnson – 8 receptions, 135 yards, 1 TD
- MEM – Gerrard Sheppard – 9 receptions, 98 yards

Trailing 31–22 with 5 minutes remaining in regulation, Orlando rallied to beat Memphis by the score of 34–31. Garrett Gilbert threw an 18-yard touchdown to Charles Johnson with 4:49 left to trim the score to 31–28. On the ensuing drive, Memphis fumbled away the snap on a punt, giving Orlando the ball inside the 30 yard line. A few plays later, controversy erupted when Express coach Mike Singletary ran out on the field protesting what appeared to be a delay of game that was not called against the Apollos. Singletary received an unsportsmanlike conduct penalty, and the Apollos punched the ball in with a 1 yard touchdown run by De'Veon Smith for the game-winning score. Johnny Manziel started at quarterback for the Express, but left the game in the first quarter after a head injury.

== Media ==
Apollos' games were broadcast on iHeartRadio's Real Radio 104.1 FM with the Apollos' weekly radio show heard Thursdays on WYGM and WJRR HD-2 channel, while a weekday program was heard on a group of thirteen area radio stations. The Apollos also had a weekly TV show every Wednesday night at 11 p.m. on Cox's TV 27. The program, APOLLOS FOOTBALL with Steve Spurrier, allowed fans to get a deeper look at the team, with player features, behind-the-scenes access, and detailed analysis following each game.
