= Jalin Marshall =

American football player (born 1995)

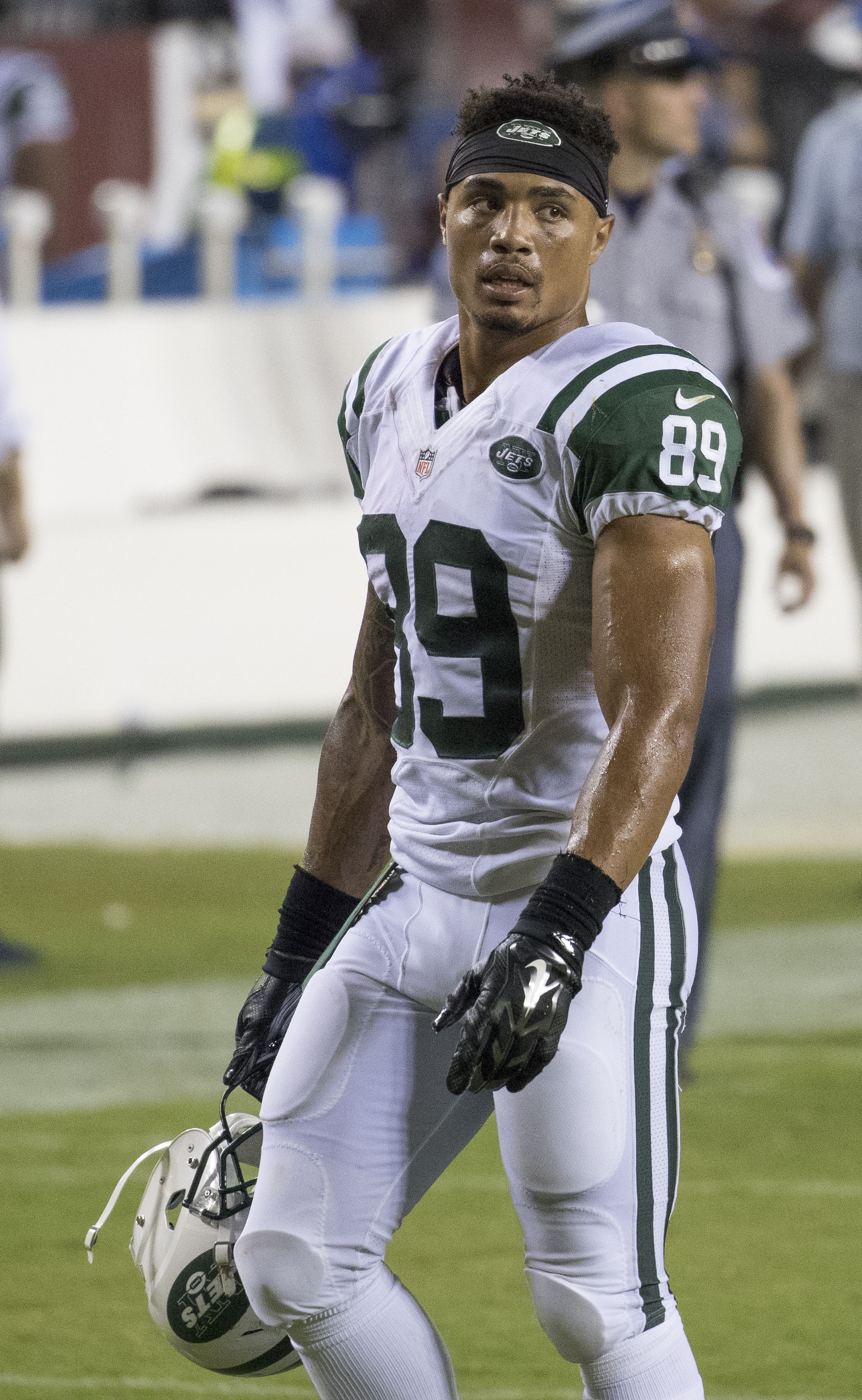
- Marshall with the New York Jets in 2016

Profile
- Positions: Wide receiver, return specialist

Personal information
- Born: July 21, 1995 (age 31); Middletown, Ohio, U.S.
- Listed height: 5 ft 11 in (1.80 m)
- Listed weight: 200 lb (91 kg)

Career information
- High school: Middletown (OH)
- College: Ohio State (2013–2015)
- NFL draft: 2016: undrafted

Career history
- New York Jets (2016–2017); Orlando Apollos (2019); Oakland Raiders (2019)*; Hamilton Tiger-Cats (2019–2021); Edmonton Elks (2022); Tucson Sugar Skulls (2024)
- * Offseason or practice squad member only

Career NFL statistics
- Receptions: 14
- Receiving yards: 162
- Return yards: 424
- Total touchdowns: 2
- Stats at Pro Football Reference
- Stats at CFL.ca

Jalin Delane Marshall (born July 21, 1995) is an American professional football wide receiver and return specialist. He signed with the New York Jets of the National Football League (NFL) as an undrafted free agent following the 2016 NFL draft. He played college football for the Ohio State Buckeyes. He has also played for the Orlando Apollos of the Alliance of American Football (AAF) and the Hamilton Tiger-Cats and Edmonton Elks of the Canadian Football League (CFL).

== Early life ==
Marshall attended Middletown High School in Middletown, Ohio. He played wide receiver and quarterback. During his career, he rushed for 4,759 yards and had 54 total touchdowns. Marshall was rated by Scout.com as a five-star recruit and committed to Ohio State University to play college football.

== College career ==
After redshirting his first year at Ohio State in 2013, Marshall played in all 15 games as a redshirt freshman in 2014. He finished second on the team with 38 receptions for 499 yards and six touchdowns. The receptions were second most by an Ohio State freshman behind Cris Carter's 41 in 1984. Marshall also added a rushing touchdown and a punt return touchdown. Marshall was suspended for the first game of his redshirt sophomore year in 2015 due to a violation of team rules. He returned from suspension and played in the final 12 games. He finished the year with 36 receptions for 477 yards and five touchdowns. After the season, Marshall decided to forgo his remaining two years of eligibility and entered the 2016 NFL draft.

== Professional career ==
Pre-draft measurables
| Height | Weight | Arm length | Hand span | 40-yard dash | 10-yard split | 20-yard split | 20-yard shuttle | Three-cone drill | Vertical jump | Broad jump | Bench press |
|---|---|---|---|---|---|---|---|---|---|---|---|
| 5 ft 10 1/2 in (1.79 m) | 200 lb (91 kg) | 31 1/2 in (0.80 m) | 9 5/8 in (0.24 m) | 4.60 s | 1.56 s | 2.68 s | 4.13 s | 6.80 s | 37.5 in (0.95 m) | 10 ft 5 in (3.18 m) | 16 reps |
All values from NFL Combine

=== New York Jets ===
Marshall signed as an undrafted free agent for the New York Jets on April 30, 2016.

Going into the regular season, Marshall was named the fourth wide receiver on the Jets depth chart behind veterans Brandon Marshall, Eric Decker, and Quincy Enunwa. He was also given punt and kick return duties. He made his professional regular season debut in the Jets' season opener against the Cincinnati Bengals and finished with three kick returns for 36-yards and two punt returns for five yards. He finished that game with three catches for 45 receiving yards in a 37–31 victory over the Buffalo Bills. On November 6, 2016, Marshall caught three passes for 59 receiving yards and caught an 18-yard touchdown pass from Ryan Fitzpatrick for his first career touchdown during a 23–27 loss to the Miami Dolphins. During his rookie season, Marshall was diagnosed with a torn labrum on his right shoulder, but managed to power through it and play 10 games with 162 receiving yards and two touchdowns. He also made 13 kickoff returns for 324 yards and 18 punt returns for 100 yards.

On March 7, 2017, it was announced that Marshall would be suspended the first four games of the 2017 season for violating the NFL policy on performance enhancing substances. On October 14, 2017, after being reinstated from suspension, Marshall was waived by the Jets and was re-signed to the practice squad. He signed a reserve/future contract with the Jets on January 1, 2018. He was waived by the Jets on April 28, 2018.

=== Orlando Apollos ===
In 2019, he signed on to play for the Orlando Apollos of the Alliance of American Football (AAF) for the inaugural 2019 season. In the Apollos’ first game against the Atlanta Legends, Marshall scored the first-ever touchdown in both the Apollos' and AAF's history. In eight games, Marshall caught 26 passes for 364 yards and three touchdowns. He also had a single rush for two yards, caught a two-point conversion, and threw a five-yard touchdown pass.

=== Oakland Raiders ===
After the AAF's shutdown in April 2019, Marshall signed with the Oakland Raiders on May 7, but was waived two days later.

=== Hamilton Tiger-Cats ===
Marshall signed to the practice roster of the Hamilton Tiger-Cats of the Canadian Football League (CFL) on June 18, 2019. On June 19, 2019, it was announced that he was suspended by the NFL for the first four weeks of the 2019 NFL season. He was promoted to the Tiger-Cats' active roster on June 27, and moved back to the practice roster on July 12. He was promoted to the active roster again on July 31, and moved back to the practice roster again on August 9. He was promoted again on August 23, and moved to the practice roster again on August 31. He was promoted to the active roster for the fourth time on September 19. He was reinstated from NFL suspension on October 1, 2019, while still a member of the Tiger-Cats' active roster. Marshall re-signed with the Tiger-Cats on January 2, 2021.

=== Edmonton Elks ===
Marshall signed with the Edmonton Elks of the CFL on February 8, 2022.

=== Tucson Sugar Skulls ===
On April 8, 2024, Marshall signed with the Tucson Sugar Skulls. He was released on June 24.
