= Chris Thompson (wide receiver) =

American football player (born 1994)

No. 14
- Position: Wide receiver

Personal information
- Born: May 9, 1994 (age 32); Gainesville, Florida, U.S.
- Listed height: 6 ft 0 in (1.83 m)
- Listed weight: 175 lb (79 kg)

Career information
- High school: Gainesville
- College: Florida
- NFL draft: 2017: undrafted

Career history
- Houston Texans (2017–2018); Orlando Apollos (2019); San Francisco 49ers (2019–2020)

Career NFL statistics
- Receptions: 5
- Receiving yards: 84
- Return yards: 408
- Stats at Pro Football Reference

Chris Thompson (born May 9, 1994) is an American former professional football player who was a wide receiver in the National Football League (NFL). He played college football for the Florida Gators, and was signed by the Houston Texans as an undrafted free agent in 2017.

== Professional career ==
Pre-draft measurables
Height	Weight	Arm length	Hand span	40-yard dash	10-yard split	20-yard split	20-yard shuttle	Three-cone drill	Vertical jump	Broad jump	Bench press
5 ft 11 1/8 in (1.81 m)	171 lb (78 kg)	31 1/8 in (0.79 m)	9 1/4 in (0.23 m)	4.48 s	1.48 s	2.63 s	4.25 s	7.00 s	34.5 in (0.88 m)	10 ft 1 in (3.07 m)	6 reps
All values from Pro Day

=== Houston Texans ===
Thompson signed with the Houston Texans as an undrafted free agent on May 16, 2017. He was waived on September 2, 2017, and was signed to the Texans' practice squad the next day. He was promoted to the active roster on September 27, 2017.

On August 28, 2018, Thompson was waived by the Texans.

=== Orlando Apollos ===
In 2019, Thompson joined the Orlando Apollos of the Alliance of American Football.

=== San Francisco 49ers ===
After the AAF folded in April 2019, he signed with the San Francisco 49ers on August 3, 2019, but was waived five days later. He was re-signed on August 20, 2019. He was waived on August 31, 2019.

In October 2019, Thompson was selected by the Tampa Bay Vipers in the open phase of the 2020 XFL draft, but did not sign with the league.

Thompson was re-signed to the 49ers' practice squad on December 3, 2019. He re-signed with the 49ers on February 5, 2020. Thompson was waived/injured on August 15, 2020, and subsequently reverted to the team's injured reserve list the next day. He was waived on March 19, 2021.
