= Akeem Hunt =

American gridiron football player (born 1993)

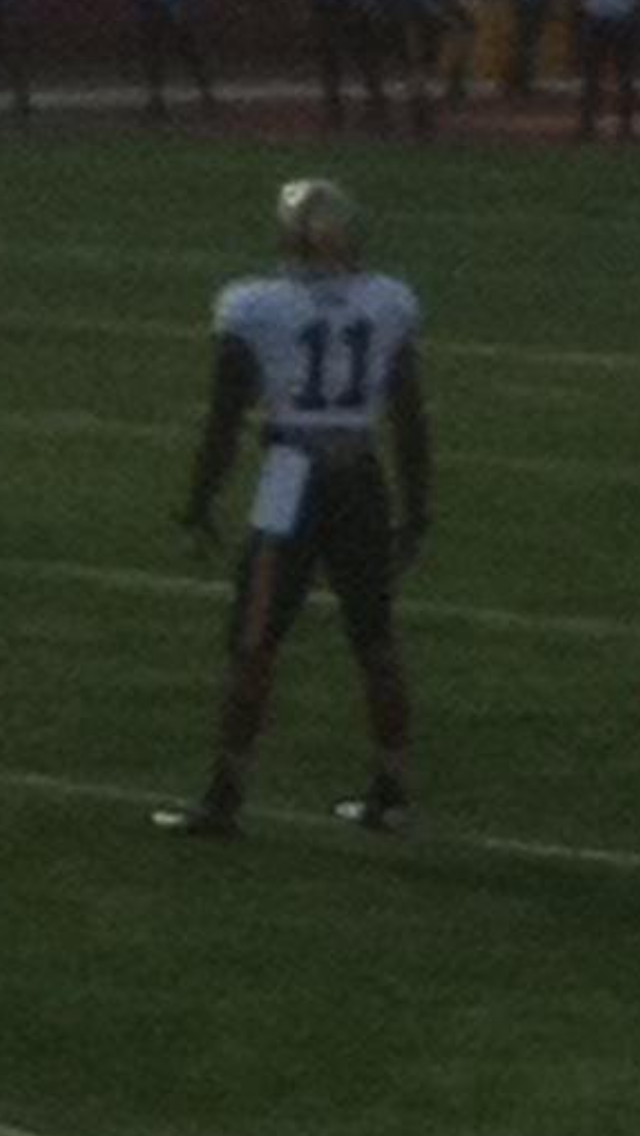
- Hunt with Purdue in 2012

No. 31, 33, 39
- Position: Running back

Personal information
- Born: February 22, 1993 (age 33); Covington, Georgia, U.S.
- Listed height: 5 ft 10 in (1.78 m)
- Listed weight: 182 lb (83 kg)

Career information
- High school: Newton (Covington)
- College: Purdue
- NFL draft: 2015: undrafted

Career history
- New York Giants (2015)*; Baltimore Ravens (2015)*; Houston Texans (2015–2016); Kansas City Chiefs (2017); Orlando Apollos (2019); Tennessee Titans (2019)*; Ottawa Redblacks (2020–2021)
- * Offseason or practice squad member only

Career NFL statistics
- Rushing yards: 228
- Rushing average: 5.1
- Receptions: 13
- Receiving yards: 99
- Return yards: 824
- Stats at Pro Football Reference

Akeem Bernard Hunt (born February 22, 1993) is an American former professional football player who was a running back in the National Football League (NFL). He was signed by the New York Giants as an undrafted free agent in 2015. He played college football for the Purdue Boilermakers. He was also a member of the Baltimore Ravens, Houston Texans, Kansas City Chiefs, Orlando Apollos, Tennessee Titans, and Ottawa Redblacks.

== Early life ==
Hunt attended and played high school football at Newton High School.

== College career ==
During his college football career at Purdue University, Hunt rushed for 2,035 yards on 371 carries with 11 rushing touchdowns, six receiving touchdowns, and three kick return touchdowns.

=== College statistics ===
Year	Team	Rushing					Receiving			Kickoff Returns			
Year	Team	Att	Yards	Avg	Yds/G	TD	Rec	Yards	TD	Att	Yards	Avg	TD
2011	Purdue	33	287	8.7	23.9	2	1	4	0	7	173	24.7	0
2012	Purdue	42	335	8.0	25.8	2	13	204	2	39	867	22.2	1
2013	Purdue	123	464	3.8	38.7	1	38	340	2	24	626	26.1	1
2014	Purdue	173	949	5.5	79.1	6	48	293	2	4	81	20.3	1
Career	371	2,035	5.5	41.5	11	100	841	6	74	1,747	23.6	3	

== Professional career ==
=== New York Giants ===
On May 8, 2015, Hunt signed with the New York Giants as an undrafted free agent. He was waived with an hamstring injury on September 2 and was placed on injured reserve the next day.

=== Baltimore Ravens ===
Hunt was signed to the Baltimore Ravens practice squad on October 13, 2015. He was released by the team on October 20.

=== Houston Texans ===
Hunt was signed to the Houston Texans practice squad on November 2, 2015. He was promoted to the active roster on November 21. On November 22, he made his NFL debut with two carries for four yards against the New York Jets. Overall, he finished the 2015 season with 17 carries for 96 rushing yards to go along with six receptions for 39 yards in seven games.

On September 3, 2016, Hunt was released by the Texans and signed to the practice squad the next day. On November 12, Hunt was promoted to the Texans' active roster. He finished the 2016 season with 20 carries for 109 rushing yards and three receptions for 29 yards in eight games.

On September 3, 2017, Hunt was waived by the Texans.

=== Kansas City Chiefs ===
On September 5, 2017, Hunt was signed to the Kansas City Chiefs' practice squad. He was promoted to the active roster on September 16, 2017. He appeared in 15 games, primarily on special teams, and recorded eight carries for 23 rushing yards and four receptions for 31 yards. He was placed on injured reserve on January 2, 2018, with an ankle injury.

Hunt was waived by the Chiefs on May 8, 2018, with a failed physical designation. After going unclaimed on waivers, he was placed on the physically unable to perform list. He was released with an injury settlement on June 20, 2018.

=== Orlando Apollos ===
In 2019, Hunt joined the Orlando Apollos of the Alliance of American Football. On March 2, 2019, Hunt rushed for his first career touchdown in professional football. Hunt saw sporadic usage over the 8 games played; some weeks Hunt was the leading running backs while others had him phased out of the offense altogether. Hunt was effective when used, averaging 5 yards per carry, and nearly 10 yards per reception. Across the 8 weeks of play prior to the league's suspension of operations, Hunt had 37 carries for 185 yards and a score, while catching 5 passes for 49 yards, as well as a two point conversion.

=== Tennessee Titans ===
On August 10, 2019, Hunt was signed by the Tennessee Titans. On August 30, Hunt was waived by the Titans.

=== Ottawa Redblacks ===
Hunt was signed by the Ottawa Redblacks of the Canadian Football League on December 9, 2019. He was placed on the suspended list on July 16, 2021.
