= Mike Waddell (sports administrator) =

American professional sports executive

Biographical details
- Born: Hickory, North Carolina, U.S.
- Education: Guilford College (BS); Ohio University (MA)

Administrative career (AD unless noted)
- 2001–2006: Akron (assoc. AD/interim AD)
- 2006–2010: Cincinnati (senior assoc. AD)
- 2010–2013: Towson (Director of Athletics)
- 2013–2014: Arkansas (senior assoc. AD)
- 2014–2016: Illinois (senior assoc. AD)
- 2016-2018: International Speedway Corporation (vice president)
- 2018–2019: Orlando Apollos (president)
- 2019–2020: Orlando Storm (president)
- 2020–2022: Allen Americans (president)(governor)

Mike Waddell is an American professional sports executive who is the founder of Brentwood Partners, LLC, a sports consulting firm, in which he is currently the principal, along with managing director Keith Tribble.

Previously, Waddell was president of the ECHL Allen Americans for two seasons during the global pandemic, and the Orlando Apollos of the Alliance of American Football. Following the AAF's folding, Waddell also worked with World TeamTennis to provide counsel to the Orlando Storm in advance of the team's second season in 2020.

== Early life, education, and family ==
Waddell was born in Hickory, North Carolina and graduated from The Asheville School in 1988. He went on to play football at Guilford College where he earned his bachelor's degree in sports management in 1991. Waddell continued his education later in his career at Ohio University where he completed a master's degree in sports administration in 2010.

== Career ==
Waddell began his career in college athletics as a radio and television broadcaster at the University of North Carolina at Chapel Hill from 1991 to 1994, the University of Virginia from 1994 to 1997, Appalachian State University from 1997 to 2000, and the United States Military Academy at West Point from 2000 to 2001.

Waddell served in executive positions in the athletics departments at the University of Akron from 2001 to 2006, the University of Cincinnati from 2006 to 2010, as the director of athletics at Towson University from 2010 to 2013, the University of Arkansas from 2013 to 2014, and the University of Illinois from 2014 to 2016.

Waddell relocated to Orlando in 2018 after serving as vice president at Richmond Raceway in NASCAR from 2016 to 2018, where he oversaw the reformation of the ticketing, marketing and communications units, and founded the first-ever NASCAR track owned eSports team.

Waddell made the transition to pro sports in 2018 when he was named president of the Orlando Apollos of the Alliance of American Football (AAF) on August 4, 2018 and remained in this position until the AAF ceased operations in April, 2019.

On March 25, 2020 Waddell agreed to terms with the ECHL's Allen Americans to become the club's president and alternate governor. He was elevated to governor in March 2021.
