= Boca Raton Community High School =

High school in Boca Raton, Florida

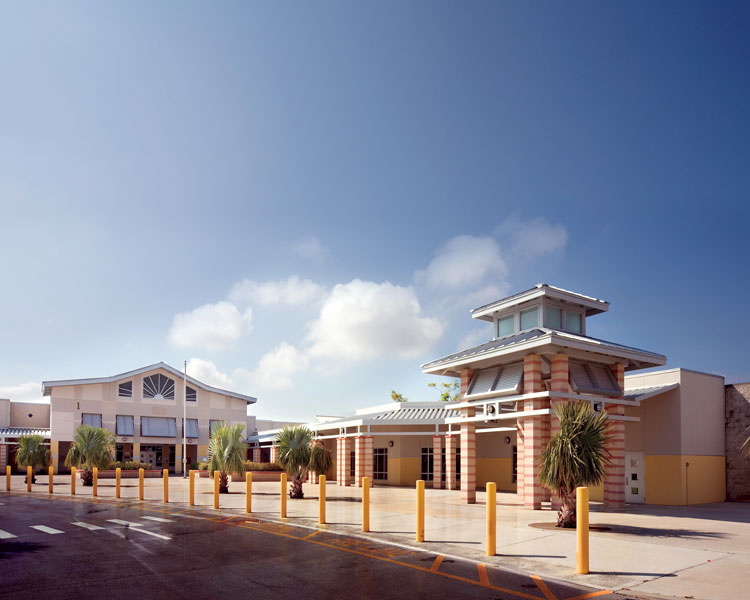

Location
- 1501 Northwest 15th Court; Boca Raton, Florida; United States; 26.362254°N 80.116757°W

Information
- Type: Magnet
- Established: 1963
- School district: School District of Palm Beach County
- Principal: Joshua Davidow
- Staff: 152.50 (FTE)
- Grades: 9–12
- Enrollment: 2,819 (2024-2025)
- Student to teacher ratio: 18.86
- Campus size: 39.9 acres
- Colors: Blue and Gold
- Mascot: Bobcat
- Newspaper: The Paw Print
- Website: brhs.palmbeachschools.org

Boca Raton Community High School is a magnet school that is part of the School District of Palm Beach County, Florida, United States. The high school has been rated an "A" school each consecutive year by the Florida Department of Education since 2005 and was ranked 62nd on the list of America's Best High Schools by Newsweek in 2010.

== Campus ==
In 2002, the school was almost entirely demolished, and then reconstructed as a new campus. There is a new science building.

In August 2007, the building of a new stadium began, and it was finished by July 2008. According to the South Florida Sun-Sentinel, the stadium features FieldTurf, a type of artificial turf with a thin, blade-like carpet that will allow use no matter what the weather. The new turf is also twice as soft as the previous field, so falling on it is safer. The installation of artificial turf was the first for any school in the Palm Beach County School District, according to Jim Cartmill, assistant director of program management with the School Board.

The stadium features a nine-lane track, bleachers that stretch from goal line to goal line (for the home team fans) and from 10-yard line to 10-yard line (for visitors), with seating for up to 4,025 people, a 1,000 seat increase over the previous stadium. The stadium is accessible to the handicapped. It also has a pole vault and high jump, along with eight lighted tennis courts. An Olympic-sized swimming pool was added and opened in early 2011.

== Student body ==
=== Statistics ===
- Student-teacher ratio is 1:17
- 4% of teachers have advanced degrees
- The average number of years teachers spend teaching is 23

=== Student ethnicity ===
Student ethnicity is as follows:

- White 61%
- Hispanic 23%
- Black 11%
- Mixed race 3%
- Asian 3%
- Native American <1%
- European <1%

=== Student subgroups ===
Statistics:

- Students eligible for free or reduced-price lunch program 32%
- Students with disabilities 11%
- Gifted students 2%
- English language learners 6%

== Academics ==
=== FCAT scores ===
2009 Passing Rate:

Grade 9

- Reading 70% (State Average: 49%)
- Math 85% (State Average: 68%)

Grade 10

- Reading 58% (State Average: 37%)
- Math 89% (State Average: 69%)
- Writing 89% (State Average: 77%)

Grade 11

- Science 53% (State Average: 37%)

Year	School Grade
1999	C
2000	C
2001	C
2002	C
2003	B
2004	B
2005	A
2006	A
2007	A
2008	A
2009	A
2010	A
2011	A
2012	A
2013	A
2014	A
2015	A
2016	A
2017	A
2018	A
2019	A
2020	N/A
2021	A
2022	A
2023	A
2024	A
2025	A

== Athletics ==
There has been a history of competitive rivalry with the neighboring high school, West Boca Raton Community High School, and Atlantic High School in football and baseball. In soccer and volleyball, however, the rivalry is with Spanish River High School.

=== Types of sports offered ===
As of 2018:

- Baseball: Junior Varsity, Varsity
- Basketball: (Boys/Girls) - Freshman, Junior Varsity, Varsity
- Bowling: (Boys/Girls)) - Varsity
- Cheerleading: Junior Varsity, Varsity, Competition
- Cross-Country - (Boys/Girls)
- Dance: (Boys/Girls)
- Football: Freshman, Junior Varsity, Varsity
- Golf: (Boys/Girls)
- Ice Hockey: Varsity
- Intramural Flag Football
- Lacrosse: (Boys/Girls)
- Marching Band
- Soccer: (Boys/Girls)- Junior Varsity, Varsity
- Softball: Junior Varsity, Varsity
- Swimming & Diving
- Tennis
- Track/Field
- Water Polo: (Boys/Girls)
- Weightlifting: (Boys/Girls) Varsity
- Volleyball: (Boys/Girls)
- Wrestling: Junior Varsity, Varsity

=== Achievements ===
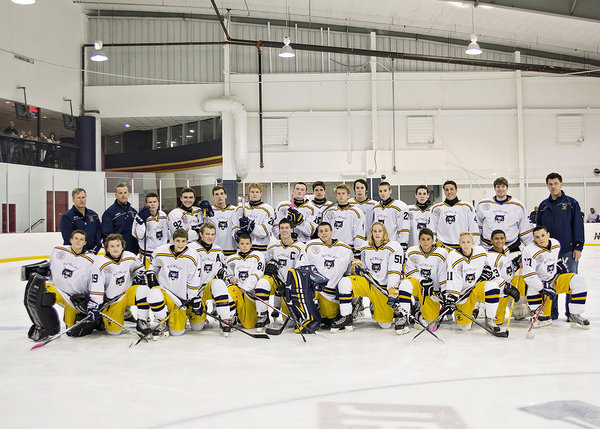
Boca High Ice Hockey D2 Champions

Swimming:

- In 2007, after two years of near misses, the girls' team won the state championship. They went on to repeat the state title in 2008. The boys' team placed 37th in 2007, and followed with state runner-up in 2008; tied for the highest finish in school history. In 2012, the boys team places 1st overall at the state championships. As of 2018, the swim team is coached by Allan Williams.

Water Polo

- In 2019, the Men's Water Polo team captured their third District Championship in school history while also making their first State Championship Tournament in school history.

== Student Government Association (SGA) ==
The Student Council of Boca Raton Community High School has a dominant presence at the Florida Association of Student Councils (FASC), and has been recognized accordingly. The leadership students have won more project awards in more categories than any other school in the state of Florida. For the 2011–2012 school year, Boca High's Ian Mellul was elected to serve as president of the FASC.The leadership students most recently accomplished the following at the 2010 FASC States Competition:

== Boca Raton NJROTC ==
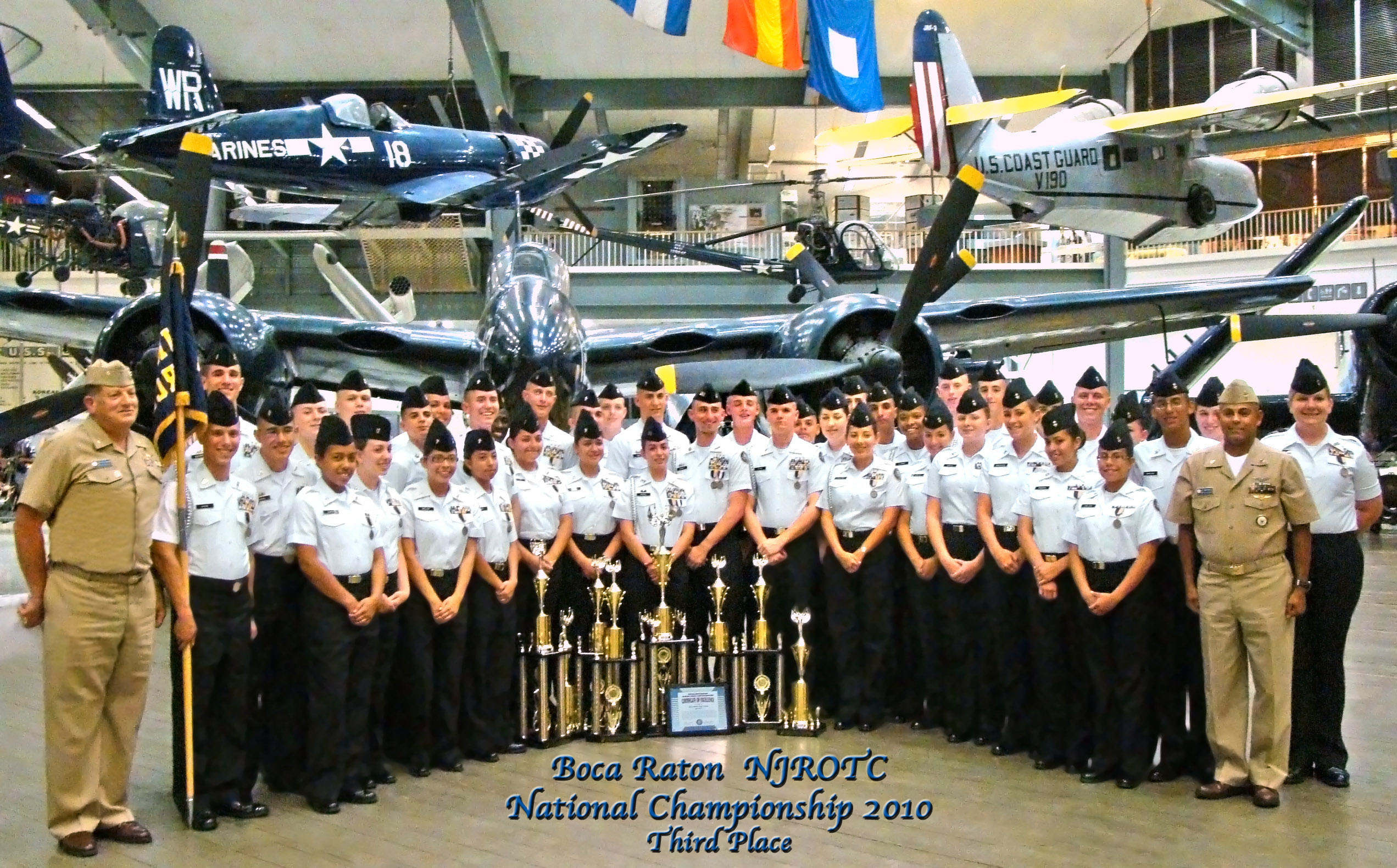
2010 Nationals Competing Team

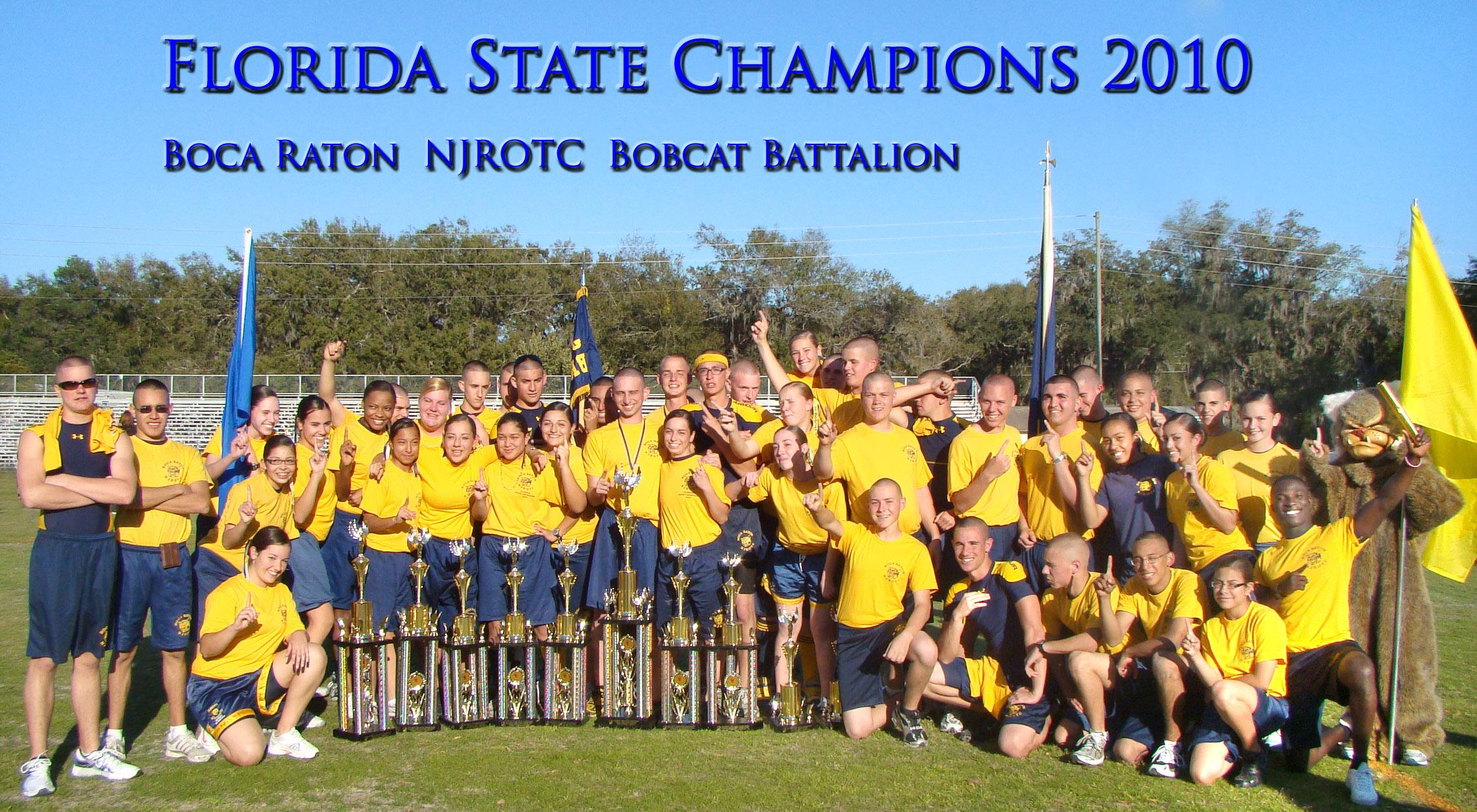
2010 Florida State Champions

The Bobcat Battalion was started in 1994 by LCDR Kenneth A. Bingham USN (Ret.). It has since become one of the best in the nation. The Regiment consisted of five companies, with approximately 400 cadets in the unit as of 2014. Cadets' daily curriculum involves academics, physical training (PT), and general knowledge on life in the United States Navy. The NJROTC's main goal is to develop informed citizens.

== Notable alumni ==
=== Sports ===
- Kevin Anderson, XFL quarterback
- Greg Bellisari, former NFL player
- Steve Bellisari, former AFL player
- Yvenson Bernard, former CFL running back, played for the Saskatchewan Roughriders, and the Winnipeg Blue Bombers of the Canadian Football League
- Chi Chi Gonzalez, baseball pitcher; MLB Texas Rangers (2015–2016); currently a free agent
- Ernie Jones, former NFL player
- Sabby Piscitelli (born August 24, 1983), American professional wrestler and former American football safety
- Michael Pratt (American football) Former University of Tulane, quarterback and Quarterback for the Green Bay Packers
- Mark Richt, former American football head coach and player who previously held positions as the head football coach at the University of Georgia and University of Miami
- Chris Stynes, former MLB player 1995–2004
- Derek Botelho, former MLB & MiLB player and pitching coach

=== Music ===
- Chris Carrabba, lead singer and guitarist of the band Dashboard Confessional, lead singer of the band Further Seems Forever, and the vocalist for the folk band Twin Forks.
- Trevor Wayne, Original Broadway cast member of The Outsiders; Took over the role of 'Ponyboy Curtis' in September, 2025.

=== Movies ===
- Noah Centineo attended 9th and 10th grade at Boca Raton High School before moving to Los Angeles to pursue acting. He has been in Austin & Ally, The Fosters, and the Netflix romantic comedy, To All the Boys I’ve Loved Before.

=== Hedge Fund Managers ===
- Kenneth C. Griffin attended, was the president of his math club.

== See also ==
- Education in the United States
- List of school districts in Florida
