= Terence Garvin =

American football player (born 1991)

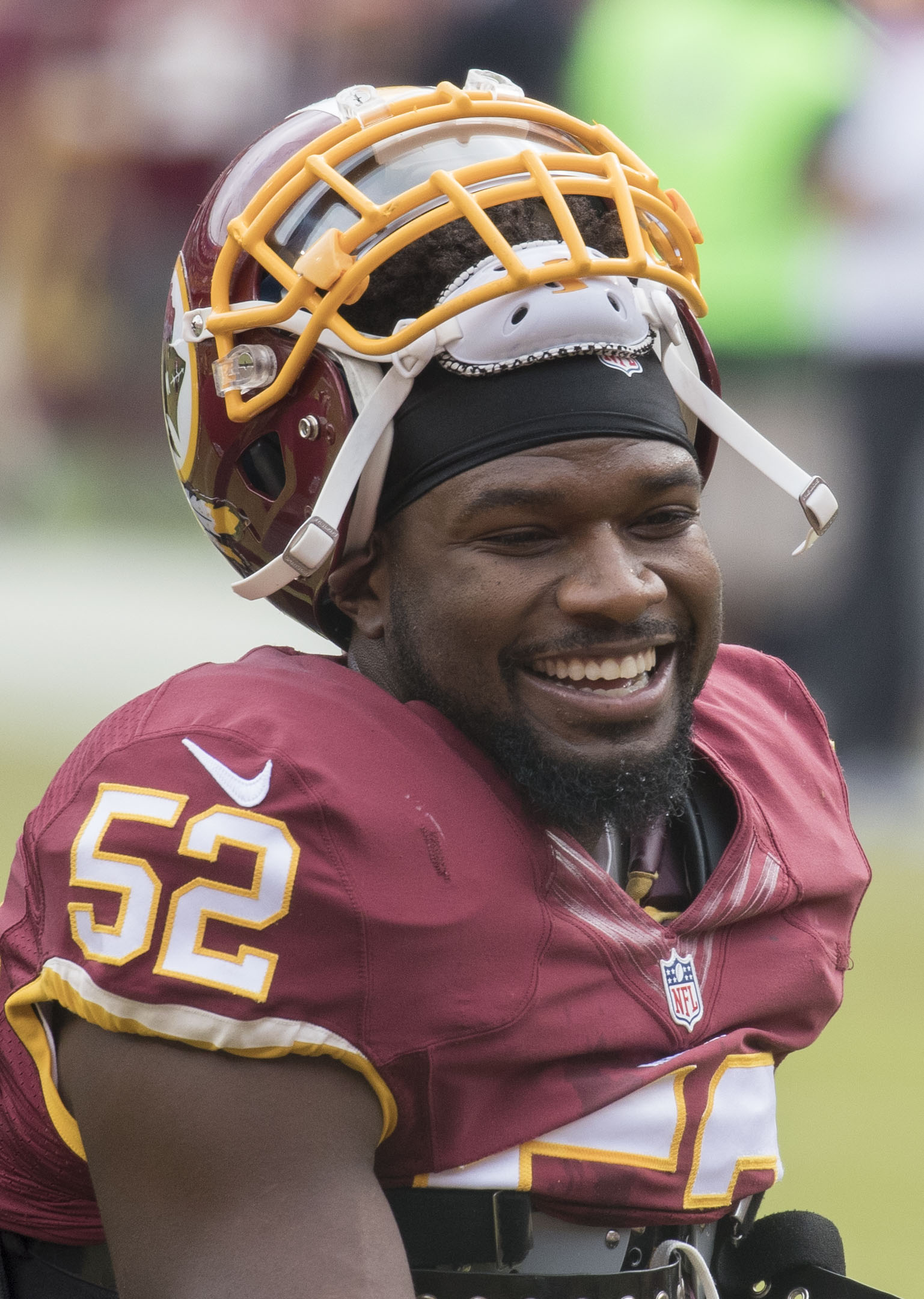
- Garvin with the Washington Redskins in 2016

Norfolk State Spartans
- Title: Defensive coordinator

Personal information
- Born: January 1, 1991 (age 35); Baltimore, Maryland, U.S.
- Listed height: 6 ft 3 in (1.91 m)
- Listed weight: 242 lb (110 kg)

Career information
- High school: Towson (MD) Loyola Blakefield
- College: West Virginia
- NFL draft: 2013: undrafted

Career history

Playing
- Pittsburgh Steelers (2013–2015); Washington Redskins (2016); Seattle Seahawks (2017); Miami Dolphins (2018)*; San Francisco 49ers (2018); Orlando Apollos (2019); St. Louis BattleHawks (2020)
- * Offseason or practice squad member only

Coaching
- Florida Memorial (2022) Assistant special teams coordinator, defensive run game coordinator, & linebackers coach; Florida Memorial (2023–2024) Co-defensive coordinator; Norfolk State (2025–present) Defensive coordinator

Career NFL statistics
- Total tackles: 77
- Sacks: 1.5
- Forced fumbles: 2
- Stats at Pro Football Reference

Terence Damian Garvin (born January 1, 1991) is an American college football coach and former linebacker. He is the defensive coordinator for Norfolk State, a position he has held since 2025. He played college football for West Virginia. After going undrafted in 2013, he signed with the Pittsburgh Steelers of the National Football League (NFL). He also played for the Washington Redskins, Seattle Seahawks, Miami Dolphins, and the San Francisco 49ers, the Orlando Apollos of the Alliance of American Football (AAF), and the St. Louis Battlehawks of the XFL.

== College career ==
As a freshman at West Virginia in 2009, Garvin played in 10 games and finished with 10 tackles for the season. In 2010, Garvin started all 13 games and finished with 76 tackles. He started 11 games in 2011, but had knee surgery in December 2011. He played in 47 career games at West Virginia, registering 235 tackles, 10.5 sacks, and three forced fumbles. He also intercepted three passes, returning one for a touchdown, to go along with 11 passes defensed.

== Professional career ==
Pre-draft measurables
| Height | Weight | Arm length | Hand span | 40-yard dash | 10-yard split | 20-yard split | 20-yard shuttle | Three-cone drill | Vertical jump | Broad jump | Bench press |
|---|---|---|---|---|---|---|---|---|---|---|---|
| 6 ft 2 1/4 in (1.89 m) | 222 lb (101 kg) | 33 1/4 in (0.84 m) | 9 3/8 in (0.24 m) | 4.69 s | 1.66 s | 2.69 s | 4.33 s | 7.22 s | 34.5 in (0.88 m) | 9 ft 10 in (3.00 m) | 18 reps |
All values from Pro Day

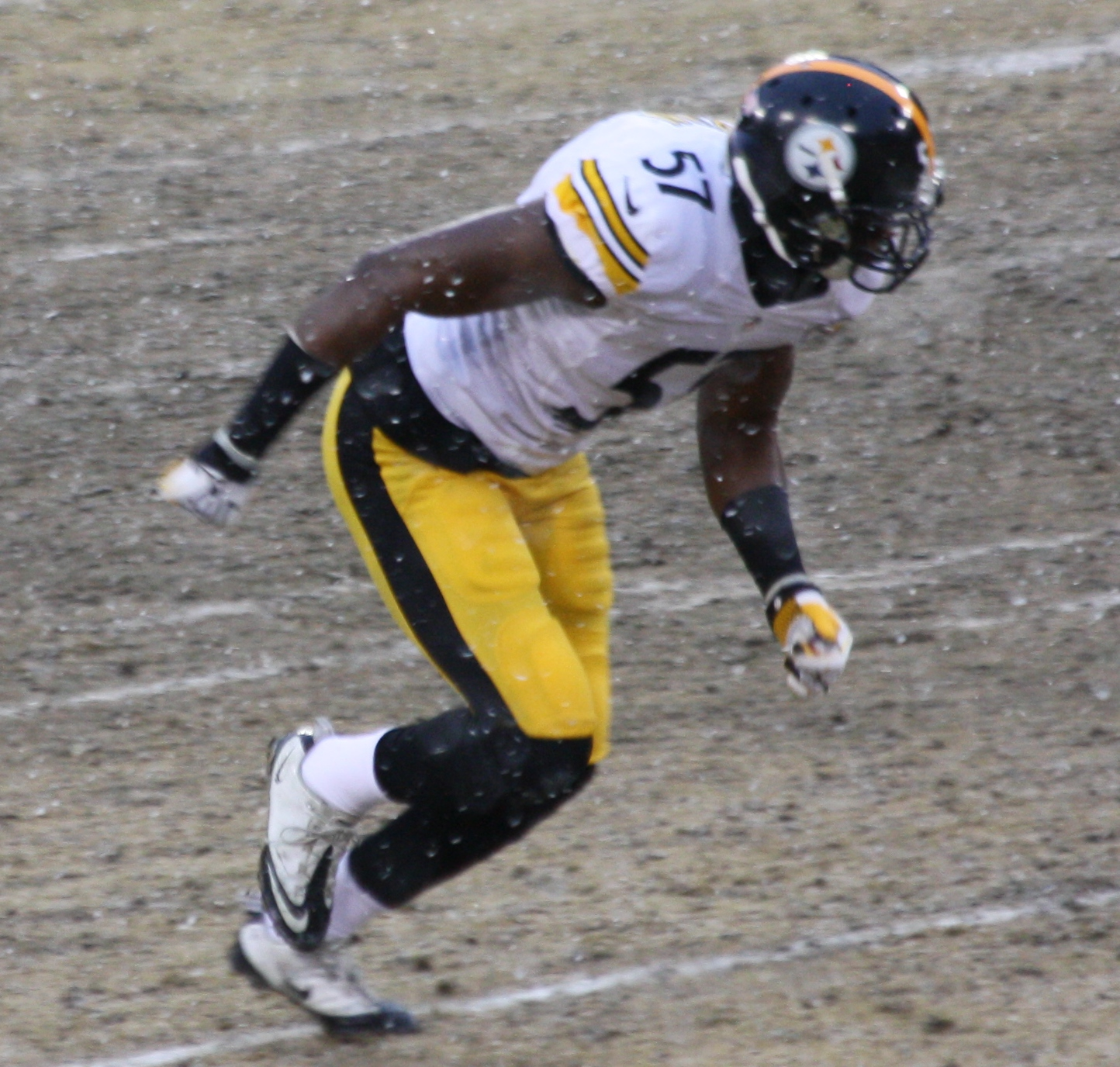
Garvin with the Pittsburgh Steelers in 2013

=== Pittsburgh Steelers ===
After going undrafted in the 2013 NFL draft, Garvin wasn't immediately signed as a free agent. He was invited to attend Pittsburgh Steelers rookie minicamp on a tryout basis and was signed to the 90-man roster on May 6. He was waived on August 31 and then re-signed to the team's practice squad. On September 3, 2013, Garvin was signed to the active roster. He saw action against the Cincinnati Bengals in Week 15 and gained notoriety when he broke the jaw of Bengals punter Kevin Huber with a hard hit during a runback for touchdown by Antonio Brown. The block was not penalized at the time, but was later ruled illegal by the NFL and cost him a $25,000 fine.

Garvin re-signed with the Steelers on a one-year contract on January 9, 2015.

=== Washington Redskins ===
On March 17, 2016, Garvin signed with the Washington Redskins. He played in all 16 games primarily on special teams, finishing second on the team with eight special teams tackles.

=== Seattle Seahawks ===
On March 24, 2017, Garvin signed with the Seattle Seahawks.

=== Miami Dolphins ===
On April 11, 2018, Garvin signed with the Miami Dolphins. He was released on September 1, 2018.

=== San Francisco 49ers ===
On September 12, 2018, Garvin was signed by the San Francisco 49ers. He was released on September 22, 2018.

=== Orlando Apollos ===
In 2019, Garvin joined the Orlando Apollos of the Alliance of American Football. In the season opener against the Atlanta Legends, Garvin recorded 8 tackles and two interceptions, one of which was returned for a touchdown, as the Apollos won 40–6. He was named Defensive Player of the Week for his performance. The league ceased operations in April 2019. Through the 8 games played, Garvin made 24 tackles, defended 6 passes, caught 3 interceptions, and recorded a sack and forced fumble.

=== St. Louis BattleHawks ===
Garvin was selected by the St. Louis BattleHawks in the 22nd Round (round two of phase three) of the 2020 XFL draft. In 5 games played prior to the COVID-19 pandemic causing the season to end prematurely, Garvin recorded 36 tackles and a sack. He had his contract terminated when the league suspended operations on April 10, 2020.

== Coaching career ==
=== Florida Memorial ===
In 2022, Garvin was hired by Florida Memorial University as the team's linebackers coach, defensive run-game coordinator and assistant special teams coordinator before being named co-defensive coordinator for 2023.

=== Norfolk State ===
On January 10, 2025, Garvin was hired as the defensive coordinator at Norfolk State.
