= Todd Washington =

American football player and coach (born 1976)

St. Louis Battlehawks
- Title: Offensive line coach

Personal information
- Born: July 19, 1976 (age 50); Nassawadox, Virginia, U.S.
- Listed height: 6 ft 3 in (1.91 m)
- Listed weight: 317 lb (144 kg)

Career information
- Position: Center (No. 75, 77)
- High school: Nandua (Onley, Virginia)
- College: Virginia Tech
- NFL draft: 1998: 4th round, 104th overall pick

Career history

Playing
- Tampa Bay Buccaneers (1998–2002); Houston Texans (2003–2005); Cleveland Browns (2006)*
- * Offseason or practice squad member only

Coaching
- University of San Diego (2007–2008) Offensive line coach; University of San Diego (2009) Offensive coordinator & offensive line coach; Hartford Colonials (2010) Offensive line coach; Baltimore Ravens (2011–2016) Assistant offensive line coach; Orlando Apollos (2018–2019) Special teams coordinator & running backs coach; New York Jets (2019–2020) Offensive assistant; Jacksonville Jaguars (2021–2023) Assistant offensive line coach; St. Louis Battlehawks (2026–present) Offensive line coach

Awards and highlights
- 2× Super Bowl champion (XXXVII, XLVII)

Career NFL statistics
- Games played: 97
- Games started: 17
- Stats at Pro Football Reference

Todd Washington (born July 19, 1976) is an American football coach and former center who is the offensive line coach for the St. Louis Battlehawks of the United Football League (UFL). He previously served as an assistant coach for the New York Jets, Orlando Apollos, Baltimore Ravens, Hartford Colonials and the University of San Diego.

Washington played college football at Virginia Tech and was drafted by the Tampa Bay Buccaneers in the fourth round of the 1998 NFL draft. He played for 8 seasons in the NFL with the Buccaneers and Houston Texans.

== Playing career ==
=== College ===
Washington started at center and both guard slots during four seasons at Virginia Tech. He helped the Hokies average more than 200 yards rushing per game over final two seasons. He started at center as a senior, earning first-team, All-Big East honors and had 81 knockdown blocks. He was selected to play on the South squad in the Senior Bowl coached by Norv Turner, then the head coach of the Washington Redskins. He was also the third ranked center heading into the NFL Draft, behind Olin Kreutz and Jermey Newberry.

=== National Football League ===
==== Tampa Bay Buccaneers ====
Washington was drafted by the Tampa Bay Buccaneers in the fourth round (104th overall) of the 1998 NFL draft. Todd played for the Buccaneers for five seasons. He is a member of the Buccaneers' Super Bowl XXXVII Championship team. He was released by the team in February 2003.

==== Houston Texans ====
Todd signed with the Texans in 2003, starting a career high 14 straight games and was a mainstay on special teams. After the Texans fired Dom Capers and hired Head Coach Gary Kubiak, Todd was released in 2006.

==== Cleveland Browns ====
On July 30, 2006, the Cleveland Browns announced the signing of Washington to a one-year contract. However, due to chronic injuries, he decided to retire and was placed on the Browns reserve/retired list on August 6, ending his playing career.

== Coaching career ==
=== University of San Diego ===
Washington began his coaching career as the offensive line coach at the University of San Diego in 2007. His Offensive line helped Torero offense average 44.3 points per game and 483.1 total yards per game...Two senior O-linemen (Jordan Paopao and Gabe DeAnda) were named to the All-PFL first-team. 2008: Offense ranked first in the Pioneer Football League in scoring (35.3 ppg), total offense (405.4 ypg), passing (269.1 ypg) and pass efficiency (163.2 rtg). He was promoted to offensive coordinator prior the 2009 campaign. During the season, the Toreros suffered significant injuries and lost seven games by an average of five points.

=== Hartford Colonials ===
Washington resigned from the Toreros' program in early 2010 to become the offensive line coach for the Hartford Colonials of the United Football League. In Hartford he worked for head coach Chris Palmer, who was the offensive coordinator during his tenure with the Houston Texans. The coaching staff also included former Texans teammate Dave Ragone. Hartford ranked No. 1 in total offense and No. 1 in rushing yards. Following the 2010 UFL season, four of his linemen signed contracts with NFL teams: Jacob Bender (Carolina Panthers), Colin Brown (Buffalo Bills), Pete Clifford (New York Jets), and Isaac Sowells (Detroit Lions).

=== Baltimore Ravens ===
On February 4, 2011, Washington was hired as assistant offensive line coach by the Baltimore Ravens. Washington was on the coaching staff that won Super Bowl XLVII. With that win, Washington became the 13th person to win a Super Bowl as a player and as a coach.

Washington was fired after the 2016 season.

=== Orlando Apollos ===
In November 2018, Washington was hired by Steve Spurrier as the running backs coach and special teams coordinator for the Orlando Apollos of the Alliance of American Football.

=== New York Jets ===
In January 2019, Washington was hired by the New York Jets as offensive assistant under head coach Adam Gase.

=== Jacksonville Jaguars ===
On February 3, 2021, Washington was hired by the Jacksonville Jaguars as their assistant offensive line coach under head coach Urban Meyer. Two weeks prior to his hiring in Jacksonville, it was announced that Washington was going to be retained by new Jets head coach Robert Saleh.

On February 17, 2022, Washington was retained under new head coach Doug Pederson. On January 9, 2024, Washington was dismissed from the Jaguars.

== Personal life ==
Washington is married to his wife, Shannon Elizabeth Keller, and they have three children together: Cameron, Ava, and, Zane. Ava plays Division I lacrosse at the University of Pittsburgh.

Washington earned a degree in physical education and health from Virginia Tech.
