= Rannell Hall =

American football player (born 1993)

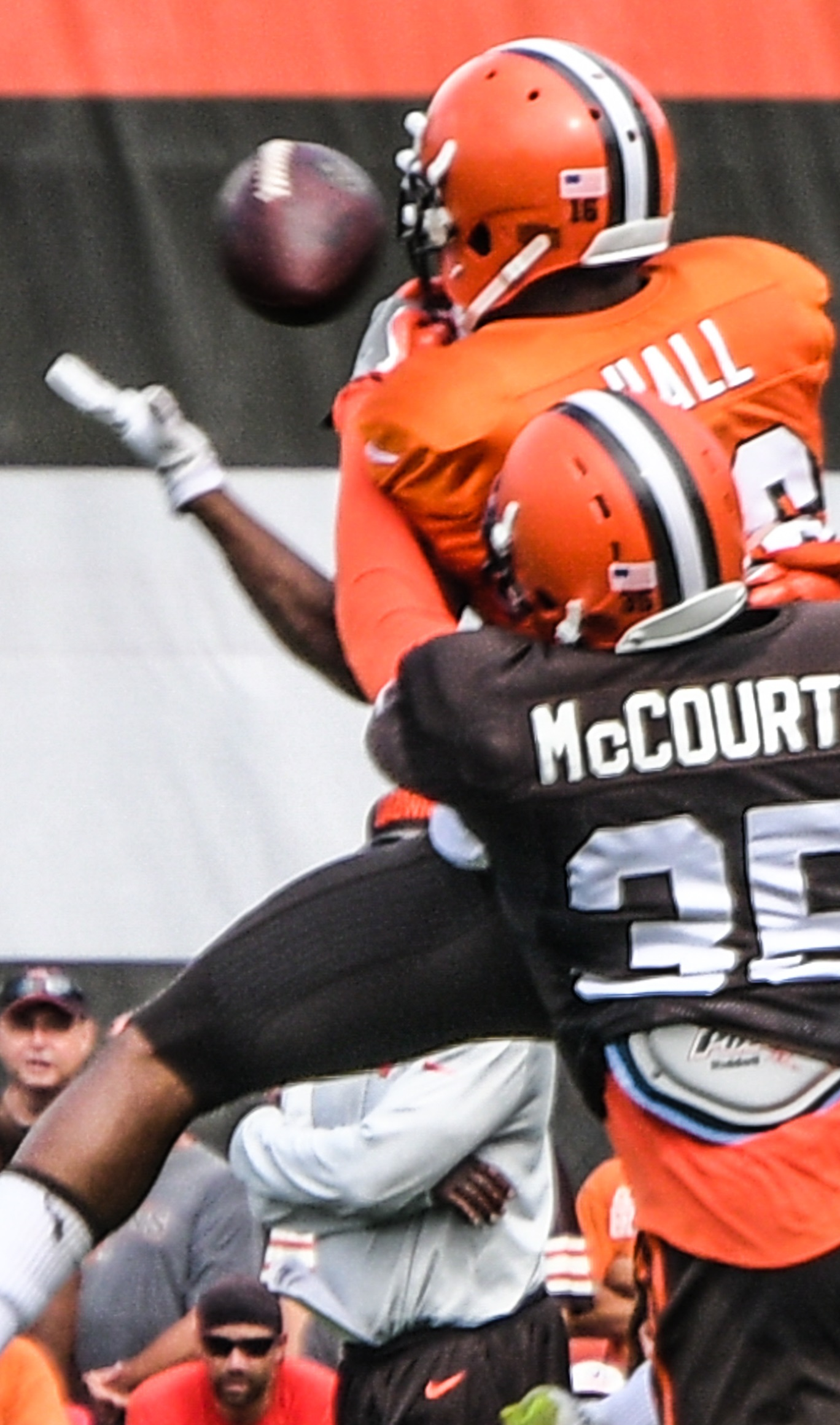
- Hall with the Cleveland Browns in 2017

No. 85
- Positions: Cornerback, wide receiver

Personal information
- Born: January 30, 1993 (age 33); Miami, Florida, U.S.
- Listed height: 6 ft 1 in (1.85 m)
- Listed weight: 200 lb (91 kg)

Career information
- High school: Miami Carol City (Miami Gardens, Florida)
- College: UCF
- NFL draft: 2015: undrafted

Career history
- Tampa Bay Buccaneers (2015)*; Cleveland Browns (2015–2017); Atlanta Falcons (2017)*; Orlando Apollos (2019); Massachusetts Pirates (2019); Winnipeg Blue Bombers (2019)*; Tampa Bay Vipers (2020); Tampa Bay Bandits (2022); Arlington Renegades (2023)
- * Offseason or practice squad member only

Awards and highlights
- XFL champion (2023); First-team All-C-USA (2011)
- Stats at Pro Football Reference

Rannell Hall (born January 30, 1993) is an American former football wide receiver and cornerback. He played college football at UCF.

== Professional career ==
=== Tampa Bay Buccaneers ===
Hall signed with the Tampa Bay Buccaneers as an undrafted free agent on May 5, 2015. He was waived on September 6, 2015 and signed to the practice squad.

=== Cleveland Browns ===
Hall signed with the Cleveland Browns off the Buccaneers' practice squad on December 14, 2015. He suffered a broken fibula before the season started and did not play at all in 2016. On February 10, 2017, the Browns re-signed Hall.

On September 2, 2017, Hall was waived by the Browns. He was re-signed to the practice squad on October 3, 2017. He was released on December 5, 2017.

=== Atlanta Falcons ===
On January 2, 2018, Hall was signed to the Atlanta Falcons' practice squad.

=== Orlando Apollos ===
In 2018, Hall signed with the Orlando Apollos for the 2019 season.

=== Winnipeg Blue Bombers ===
After the AAF ceased operations in April 2019, Hall signed with the Winnipeg Blue Bombers of the Canadian Football League on May 26, 2019. He was released on May 28.

=== Massachusetts Pirates ===
Hall played briefly for the Massachusetts Pirates of the National Arena League during the 2019 season. Hall appeared in 1 game while recording 8 receptions for 98 yards and 2 touchdowns.

=== Tampa Bay Vipers ===
In October 2019, Hall was selected by the Tampa Bay Vipers in the 2020 XFL draft. He was placed on injured reserve on February 24, 2020. He had his contract terminated when the league suspended operations on April 10, 2020.

=== Tampa Bay Bandits ===
In March 2022, Hall was selected by the Tampa Bay Bandits in the seventh round of the 2022 USFL supplemental draft. After suffering a thigh injury, he was transferred to the team's practice squad before the start of the regular season on April 16, 2022, and remained on the inactive roster on April 22 with a thigh injury. He was transferred to the active roster on April 30. He was released after the season on January 2, 2023, after the team became the Memphis Showboats.

=== Arlington Renegades ===
Hall was placed on the reserve list by the Arlington Renegades of the XFL on February 22, 2023. He was activated on March 17. He was not part of the roster after the 2024 UFL dispersal draft on January 15, 2024.
