= Walnut Grove Plantation =

Historic house in South Carolina, United States

- U.S. National Register of Historic Places
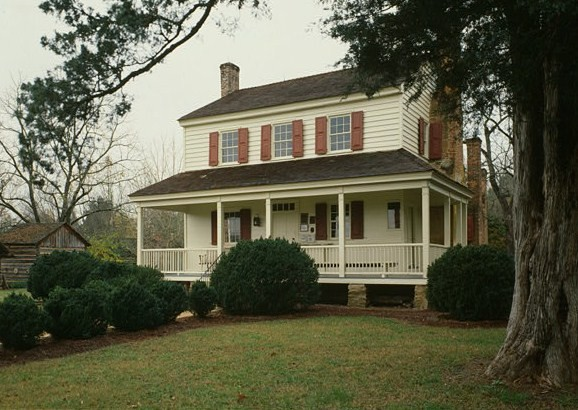
- Walnut Grove Plantation

- Location within South Carolina Location within the United States
- Interactive map showing the location of Walnut Grove Plantation
- Nearest city: Spartanburg, South Carolina
- Coordinates: 34°49′33″N 81°57′36″W
- Built: 1765
- Architectural style: Georgian
- NRHP reference No.: 70000603
- Added to NRHP: July 01, 1970

Walnut Grove Plantation, the home of Charles and Mary Moore, was built in 1765 on a land grant given by King George III. The property is located in Roebuck in Spartanburg, South Carolina. Charles Moore was a school teacher and used the 3,000-acre (12 km^{2}) plantation as a farm. The Moores had ten children, and some of their descendants still live within the area.

The eldest daughter, Margaret Catharine Moore (best known as Kate Barry), served as a scout for General Daniel Morgan during the Battle of Cowpens. Kate Moore Barry is credited with planting the grove of black walnut trees.

The plantation was renovated for $1.5 million, reopening in October 2025. Today, the main house has been renovated and preserved. Tours are given throughout the Manor as well as the other houses, including a schoolhouse, a wheat house, and several other structures.

A stain on the floor of the upstairs bedroom in the manor was for a long time believed to be the blood of a patriot named John Steadman, who was killed by Tory forces led by "Bloody" Bill Cunningham. The stain and this story were popular with tourists. As 21st-century research determined the stain was not from human blood, tour guides have been prohibited from attributing it to the Steadman murder.

== See also ==
- National Register of Historic Places listings in Spartanburg County, South Carolina
