= Donteea Dye =

American football player (born 1993)

Profile
- Position: Wide receiver

Personal information
- Born: August 20, 1993 (age 33); Cincinnati, Ohio
- Listed height: 6 ft 0 in (1.83 m)
- Listed weight: 195 lb (88 kg)

Career information
- High school: Fairfield (OH)
- College: Heidelberg
- NFL draft: 2015: undrafted

Career history
- Tampa Bay Buccaneers (2015–2016); Orlando Apollos (2019); Los Angeles Wildcats (2020)*; Tampa Bay Vipers (2020); St. Louis BattleHawks (2023)*
- * Offseason or practice squad member only

Career NFL statistics
- Receptions: 11
- Receiving yards: 132
- Receiving touchdowns: 1
- Stats at Pro Football Reference

Donteea Dye Jr. (born August 20, 1993) is an American football wide receiver. He played college football at Heidelberg University.

== Professional career ==
Even though Dye impressed scouts at the NFL Scouting Combine by running a 4.39 40-yard dash, he went undrafted in the 2015 NFL draft.

=== Tampa Bay Buccaneers ===
He signed as an undrafted rookie on May 11, 2015, by the Tampa Bay Buccaneers.

Dye caught his first pass, a touchdown thrown by Jameis Winston, in a 31–30 loss in Week 6, 2015, to the Washington Redskins. On December 17, playing against the St. Louis Rams, Dye caught a 44-yard reception inside the 5-yard line and began to celebrate, even though the play was still live. As a result, he fumbled the ball.

On August 30, 2016, Dye was waived by the Buccaneers with an injury settlement. He was re-signed to the practice squad on October 17, 2016. Two days later, Dye was promoted to the Buccaneers active roster. On October 22, the Buccaneers released Dye and re-signed him to the practice squad on October 25. He was promoted back to the active roster on December 10, 2016. He was placed on injured reserve on December 21, 2016.

On September 2, 2017, Dye was waived by the Buccaneers.

On August 26, 2018, Dye re-signed with the Buccaneers. He was waived on September 1, 2018.

=== Orlando Apollos ===
On September 14, 2018, Dye signed with the Orlando Apollos of the Alliance of American Football. The league ceased operations in April 2019.

=== Los Angeles Wildcats ===
On October 15, 2019, Dye was drafted in the 10th round during phase one in the 2020 XFL Draft by the Los Angeles Wildcats. He was waived during mini-camp

=== Tampa Bay Vipers ===
Dye signed with the Tampa Bay Vipers on December 22, 2019. He was waived again on February 25, 2020.

=== St. Louis BattleHawks ===
On November 17, 2022, Dye was drafted by the St. Louis BattleHawks of the XFL.
