= Tim Ruskell =

American football executive (born 1956)

Personal information
- Born: 1956 (age 69–70); Yokohama, Japan

Career information
- College: South Florida

Career history
- Saskatchewan Roughriders (1983–1984) Scout; Tampa Bay Bandits (1985–1986) Scout; Tampa Bay Buccaneers (1987–2003) Scout (1987–1991) Director of college scouting (1992–2000) Director of player personnel (2001–2003); Atlanta Falcons (2004) Assistant general manager; Seattle Seahawks (2005–2009) President/general manager; Chicago Bears (2010–2011) Director of player personnel; Tennessee Titans (2012–2017) Area scout; Orlando Apollos (2019) General manager

Tim Ruskell (born October 1956) is an American football executive. He last served as the general manager of the Orlando Apollos, one of the eight charter teams was the Alliance of American Football (AAF). Ruskell has previously worked for the National Football League (NFL), including positions as the team president and director of player personnel for the Seattle Seahawks, Chicago Bears, Atlanta Falcons, and Tennessee Titans.

Ruskell was born in Yokohama, Japan where his father was stationed in the United States Army, but spent his high school and college years in the Tampa Bay, Florida area and graduated with a degree in communications from the University of South Florida in 1978.

He began his professional football career as a scout for the CFL's Saskatchewan Roughriders in 1983, moving to the USFL's Tampa Bay Bandits in 1985 before first working in the NFL with the Tampa Bay Buccaneers in 1987. In 1992, he was promoted to director of college scouting, and in 2001 to director of player personnel. While in Tampa Bay, Ruskell worked with Rich McKay. When McKay left to become the president and general manager of the Atlanta Falcons in 2004 Ruskell went with him as the assistant general manager. In 2005, Ruskell replaced Bob Whitsitt as the general manager of the Seattle Seahawks.

In his first season in Seattle, Ruskell made a few roster changes that helped the Seahawks, bringing in free agents and drafting college players that played pivotal roles in the Seahawks' run to Super Bowl XL. However, the team's record gradually declined over the next four seasons. Ruskell eventually was forced to resign from his position as the Seahawks' president of football operations on December 2, 2009. At the time, the Seahawks were 4–7 and finished with a 4–12 record the year before.

Ruskell later joined the Bears as the director of player personnel, but departed the team in January 2012. He had been interviewed by the team for the general manager position after Jerry Angelo was fired after the 2011 season, but the position went to Phil Emery. He was later on the staff of the Tennessee Titans as a college scout in 2012. He was released after the 2017 NFL draft.
