= Roebuck, South Carolina =

- CDP
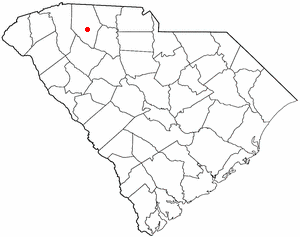
- Location of Roebuck, South Carolina
- Coordinates: 34°52′25″N 81°57′58″W
- Country: United States
- State: South Carolina
- County: Spartanburg

Area
  - Total: 4.31 sq mi (11.16 km^{2})
  - Land: 4.29 sq mi (11.11 km^{2})
  - Water: 0.019 sq mi (0.05 km^{2})
- Elevation: 735 ft (224 m)

Population (2020)
  - Total: 2,357
  - Density: 549.2/sq mi (212.06/km^{2})
- Time zone: UTC-5 (Eastern (EST))
  - Summer (DST): UTC-4 (EDT)
- ZIP code: 29376
- Area codes: 864, 821
- FIPS code: 45-61720
- GNIS feature ID: 2403490

Roebuck is a census-designated place (CDP) in Spartanburg County, South Carolina, United States. The population was 2,200 at the 2010 census.

== History ==
The community was named for Revolutionary War Officer, Benjamin Roebuck.

Roebuck is home to the Walnut Grove Plantation, a preserved 18th-century farmhouse and tourist attraction. One of the daughters of the original owners, Kate Moore, was a scout for General Daniel Morgan during the Battle of Cowpens.

Smith's Tavern was listed on the National Register of Historic Places in 1974.

== Geography ==
According to the United States Census Bureau, the CDP has a total area of 4.3 square miles (11.1 km^{2}), all land.

== Demographics ==
Historical population
Census	Pop.	Note	%±
2000	1,725		—
2010	2,200		27.5%
2020	2,357		7.1%
U.S. Decennial Census

As of the census of 2000, there were 1,725 people, 708 households, and 499 families residing in the town. The population density was 403.4 inhabitants per square mile (155.8/km^{2}). There were 783 housing units at an average density of 183.1 per square mile (70.7/km^{2}). The racial makeup of the CDP was 86.55% White, 10.84% African American, 1.22% Asian, 0.06% Pacific Islander, 0.70% from other race, and 0.64% from two or more races. Hispanic or Latino of any race were 2.72% of the population.

There were 708 households, out of which 27.7% had children under the age of 18 living with them, 57.1% were married couples living together, 10.9% had a female householder with no husband present, and 29.5% were non-families. 26.0% of all households were made up of individuals, and 9.6% had someone living alone who was 65 years of age or older. The average household size was 2.44 and the average family size was 2.92.

In the CDP, the population was spread out, with 22.7% under the age of 18, 7.1% from 18 to 24, 28.8% from 25 to 44, 28.1% from 45 to 64, and 13.3% who were 65 years of age or older. The median age was 39 years. For every 100 females, there were 93.0 males. For every 100 females age 18 and over, there were 90.7 males.

The median income for a household in the CDP was $43,523, and the median income for a family was $47,450. Males had a median income of $33,333 versus $25,368 for females. The per capita income for the CDP was $18,682. About 5.9% of families and 11.1% of the population were below the poverty line, including 9.8% of those under age 18 and 19.2% of those age 65 or over.

== Education ==
It is in Spartanburg County School District 6.

== Notable people ==
- PJ Hall, NBA basketball player for the Memphis Grizzlies
- Caleb Kennedy, singer-songwriter
