= List of Auburn Tigers in the NFL draft =

The Auburn Tigers football program of Auburn University has had 308 players drafted into the National Football League since the league began holding drafts in 1936. This includes 32 players taken in the first round and four overall number one picks: Cam Newton in 2011, Aundray Bruce in 1988, Bo Jackson in 1986, and Tucker Frederickson in 1965.

== Key ==
B	Back	K	Kicker	NT	Nose tackle
C	Center	LB	Linebacker	FB	Fullback
DB	Defensive back	P	Punter	HB	Halfback
DE	Defensive end	QB	Quarterback	WR	Wide receiver
DT	Defensive tackle	RB	Running back	G	Guard
E	End	T	Offensive tackle	TE	Tight end

== Selections ==
Year	Round	Pick	Player	Team	Position
1937	4	31	Walter Gilbert	Philadelphia Eagles	B
1937	8	76	Joel Eaves	Washington Redskins	E
1938	10	83	Jim Sivell	Brooklyn Dodgers	G
1939	8	68	Bo Russell	Washington Redskins	T
1940	20	184	Milt Howell	Brooklyn Dodgers	G
1940	21	191	Malvern Morgan	Detroit Lions	C
1941	14	129	Lloyd Cheatham	Brooklyn Dodgers	B
1941	17	158	Dick McGowen	Brooklyn Dodgers	B
1942	2	14	Lloyd Cheatham	Chicago Cardinals	B
1942	3	21	Rufus Deal	Washington Redskins	B
1943	3	17	Roy Gafford	Philadelphia Eagles	B
1943	6	46	Jim Reynolds	New York Giants	B
1944	9	87	Tex Warrington	Boston Yanks	C
1944	17	174	Aubrey Clayton	Cleveland Rams	B
1944	23	240	Jim Pharr	Cleveland Rams	C
1945	9	84	Curt Kuykendall	Washington Redskins	B
1945	19	193	Jim Bradshaw	Washington Redskins	C
1945	23	231	Everett Hartwell	Pittsburgh Steelers	E
1946	6	47	Joe Eddins	Detroit Lions	G
1946	10	84	Bill Harris	Chicago Bears	C
1946	14	127	Ty Irby	Detroit Lions	B
1949	9	90	Hal Herring	Chicago Cardinals	C
1949	16	156	Denvard Snell	Pittsburgh Steelers	T
1950	1	7	Travis Tidwell	New York Giants	B
1950	19	236	Bill Waddail	Baltimore Colts	B
1950	28	353	John Adcock	Baltimore Colts	T
1951	19	230	Billy Conn	New York Giants	B
1953	20	234	Lee Hayley	Pittsburgh Steelers	E
1953	22	259	Bill Turnbeaugh	Green Bay Packers	T
1955	1	12	Dave Middleton	Detroit Lions	B
1955	3	37	Bobby Freeman	Cleveland Browns	B
1955	7	85	Jack Locklear	Cleveland Browns	C
1955	10	113	George Rogers	Green Bay Packers	T
1955	15	180	George Atkins	Detroit Lions	G
1955	16	189	Jim Hall	San Francisco 49ers	E
1956	1	7	Joe Childress	Chicago Cardinals	B
1956	2	16	Frank D'Agostino	Philadelphia Eagles	T
1956	2	22	M. L. Brackett	Chicago Bears	T
1956	11	125	Fob James	Chicago Cardinals	B
1956	18	214	Jim Pyburn	Washington Redskins	E
1956	20	232	Bob Scarbrough	San Francisco 49ers	C
1956	20	239	Charley Maxime	Chicago Bears	G
1957	13	150	Jerry Sansom	Cleveland Browns	E
1957	19	220	Ernie Danjean	Green Bay Packers	G
1958	1	5	Jim Phillips	Los Angeles Rams	E
1958	3	33	Bobby Hoppe	San Francisco 49ers	B
1958	5	59	Bill Atkins	San Francisco 49ers	B
1958	10	114	Ben Preston	Washington Redskins	T
1958	18	212	Bill Austin	Detroit Lions	C
1958	22	262	Cleve Wester	New York Giants	T
1958	25	301	Jim Cook	Detroit Lions	B
1958	27	316	Hindman Wall	Philadelphia Eagles	E
1959	1	12	Jackie Burkett	Baltimore Colts	C
1959	2	14	Jerry Wilson	Chicago Cardinals	E
1959	4	48	Zeke Smith	Baltimore Colts	G
1959	12	144	Dick Wood	Baltimore Colts	QB
1959	15	180	Ted Foret	Baltimore Colts	T
1959	16	182	Ken Paduch	Philadelphia Eagles	T
1959	19	220	Bobby Lauder	Washington Redskins	B
1959	25	290	Jim Jeffery	Chicago Cardinals	T
1959	28	326	Leo Sexton	Philadelphia Eagles	E
1960	9	107	Bobby Wasden	San Francisco 49ers	E
1961	1	8	Ken Rice	St. Louis Cardinals	T
1961	3	31	Billy Wilson	St. Louis Cardinals	T
1961	5	62	Ed Dyas	Baltimore Colts	B
1961	16	216	Wayne Frazier	Chicago Bears	C
1961	16	224	G.W. Clapp	Philadelphia Eagles	G
1962	6	83	John McGeever	Philadelphia Eagles	RB
1962	8	103	George Gross	St. Louis Cardinals	T
1962	13	173	Dave Woodward	Pittsburgh Steelers	T
1963	3	34	Jim Price	Dallas Cowboys	LB
1963	5	62	Dave Hill	New York Giants	T
1963	11	142	Jimmy Burson	St. Louis Cardinals	DB
1963	20	268	Mailon Kent	Minnesota Vikings	B
1963	20	274	Joe Baughan	Washington Redskins	T
1964	3	34	George Rose	Minnesota Vikings	B
1964	19	253	Larry Rawson	San Francisco 49ers	B
1965	1	1	Tucker Frederickson	New York Giants	RB
1965	4	47	Jimmy Sidle	Dallas Cowboys	RB
1965	7	90	Mickey Sutton	Chicago Bears	B
1965	14	194	Mike Alford	St. Louis Cardinals	C
1965	15	206	Chuck Hurston	Green Bay Packers	T
1966	5	67	Bill Cody	Detroit Lions	LB
1966	5	78	Dan Fulford	Cleveland Browns	WR
1966	9	140	Jerry Gross	Baltimore Colts	RB
1966	10	148	Bruce Yates	Detroit Lions	T
1967	11	286	Bill Braswell	Kansas City Chiefs	G
1967	14	346	Tom Bryan	Atlanta Falcons	RB
1967	14	361	Bobby Beaird	Boston Patriots	DB
1968	1	15	Forrest Blue	San Francisco 49ers	C
1968	2	40	Fred Hyatt	St. Louis Cardinals	WR
1968	11	281	Dick Plagge	Buffalo Bills	RB
1968	15	402	Tony Lunceford	Dallas Cowboys	K
1969	7	165	Al Giffin	Denver Broncos	TE
1969	10	255	Jerry Gordon	Los Angeles Rams	T
1970	6	133	Dave Campbell	Miami Dolphins	DE
1970	8	186	Richard Cheek	Buffalo Bills	T
1970	8	189	Tom Banks	St. Louis Cardinals	C
1970	12	289	Mike Kolen	Miami Dolphins	LB
1970	14	362	Don Riley	Oakland Raiders	K
1971	4	95	Larry Willingham	St. Louis Cardinals	DB
1971	6	153	Al Bresler	San Francisco 49ers	WR
1971	9	213	Bob Strickland	Buffalo Bills	LB
1971	9	229	Mickey Zofko	Detroit Lions	RB
1971	15	371	Wallace Clark	Atlanta Falcons	RB
1972	1	19	Terry Beasley	San Francisco 49ers	WR
1972	2	40	Pat Sullivan	Atlanta Falcons	QB
1972	17	440	Dick Schmalz	Minnesota Vikings	WR
1973	11	262	James Owens	New Orleans Saints	RB
1973	11	267	Dan Sanspree	St. Louis Cardinals	DE
1973	16	405	Harry Unger	Cincinnati Bengals	RB
1974	11	261	Steve Taylor	Houston Oilers	C
1974	17	431	David Langner	Kansas City Chiefs	DB
1975	2	32	Lee Gross	New Orleans Saints	C
1975	3	67	Dan Nugent	Los Angeles Rams	TE
1975	3	73	Mike Fuller	San Diego Chargers	DB
1975	4	101	Kenneth Bernich	San Diego Chargers	LB
1975	14	353	Tom Gossom	New England Patriots	WR
1977	5	127	Neil O'Donoghue	Buffalo Bills	K
1977	12	312	Phil Gargis	New York Jets	RB
1978	1	25	Reese McCall	Baltimore Colts	TE
1979	3	79	William Andrews	Atlanta Falcons	RB
1979	6	141	Mike Burrow	Buffalo Bills	G
1980	2	29	Joe Cribbs	Buffalo Bills	RB
1981	1	24	James Brooks	San Diego Chargers	RB
1981	2	50	Byron Franklin	Buffalo Bills	WR
1981	3	57	Frank Warren	New Orleans Saints	DE
1981	8	219	Cliff Toney	Atlanta Falcons	DB
1981	11	297	Claude Matthews	Houston Oilers	G
1981	11	304	Chester Willis	Oakland Raiders	RB
1982	7	172	Edmund Nelson	Pittsburgh Steelers	DT
1982	8	216	George Peoples	Dallas Cowboys	RB
1982	9	243	Keith Uecker	Denver Broncos	T
1983	8	211	Bob Harris	Arizona Cardinals	DB
1984	1	28	Chris Woods	Los Angeles Raiders	WR
1984	2	39	Chuck Clanton	Green Bay Packers	DB
1984	2	29	Doug Smith	Houston Oilers	DE
1984	3	72	Donnie Humphrey	Green Bay Packers	DT
1984	5	118	Lionel James	San Diego Chargers	RB
1984	8	206	Jeff Jackson	Atlanta Falcons	LB
1984	10	255	David Jordan	New York Giants	G
1984	11	305	Dowe Aughtman	Dallas Cowboys	DT
1985	2	56	Ben Thomas	New England Patriots	DE
1985	5	113	Kevin Greene	Los Angeles Rams	LB
1985	6	160	Gregg Carr	Pittsburgh Steelers	LB
1985	10	258	Clayton Beauford	Detroit Lions	WR
1985	10	264	David King	San Diego Chargers	DB
1986	1	1	Bo Jackson	Tampa Bay Buccaneers	RB
1986	1	14	Gerald Robinson	Minnesota Vikings	DE
1986	2	36	Gerald Williams	Pittsburgh Steelers	DE
1986	4	101	Steve Wallace	San Francisco 49ers	T
1986	5	114	Jeff Parks	Houston Oilers	TE
1986	8	196	Lewis Colbert	Kansas City Chiefs	P
1986	10	270	Harold Hallman	San Francisco 49ers	LB
1987	1	4	Brent Fullwood	Green Bay Packers	RB
1987	3	65	Ben Tamburello	Philadelphia Eagles	C
1987	5	119	Tommie Agee	Seattle Seahawks	RB
1987	7	183	Bo Jackson	Los Angeles Raiders	RB
1987	11	305	Tim Jessie	Chicago Bears	RB
1988	1	1	Aundray Bruce	Atlanta Falcons	LB
1988	3	59	Kevin Porter	Kansas City Chiefs	DB
1988	4	83	Robert Goff	Tampa Bay Buccaneers	DT
1988	4	93	Stacy Searels	San Diego Chargers	T
1988	6	144	Nate Hill	Green Bay Packers	DE
1988	6	157	Kurt Crain	Houston Oilers	LB
1988	9	227	Reggie Ware	Los Angeles Raiders	RB
1988	12	312	Scott Bolton	Green Bay Packers	WR
1989	2	31	Lawyer Tillman	Cleveland Browns	WR
1989	2	40	Walter Reeves	Phoenix Cardinals	TE
1989	2	48	Brian Smith	Los Angeles Rams	LB
1989	3	66	Tracy Rocker	Washington Redskins	DT
1989	4	98	Ron Stallworth	New York Jets	DE
1989	7	191	Benji Roland	Minnesota Vikings	DT
1989	8	206	Brian Shulman	Green Bay Packers	P
1989	10	266	Jim Thompson	Indianapolis Colts	T
1989	10	276	Carlo Cheattom	Buffalo Bills	DB
1989	12	330	Freddy Weygand	Chicago Bears	WR
1990	2	26	Alexander Wright	Dallas Cowboys	WR
1990	7	177	Craig Ogletree	Cincinnati Bengals	LB
1990	11	294	John Hudson	Philadelphia Eagles	C
1990	12	321	Reggie Slack	Houston Oilers	QB
1991	2	29	Ed King	Cleveland Browns	G
1991	2	52	Lamar Rogers	Cincinnati Bengals	DE
1991	3	75	Rob Selby	Philadelphia Eagles	T
1991	4	101	David Rocker	Houston Oilers	DT
1991	7	187	James Joseph	Philadelphia Eagles	RB
1991	10	273	Eric Ramsey	Kansas City Chiefs	DB
1992	2	43	Eddie Blake	Miami Dolphins	DT
1992	5	129	Corey Barlow	Philadelphia Eagles	DB
1992	10	278	Bob Meeks	Denver Broncos	C
1993	5	115	Fred Baxter	New York Jets	TE
1993	5	119	James Willis	Green Bay Packers	LB
1993	5	132	Chris Gray	Miami Dolphins	G
1994	1	15	Wayne Gandy	Los Angeles Rams	T
1994	3	83	James Bostic	Los Angeles Rams	RB
1994	5	139	Anthony Redmon	Arizona Cardinals	G
1995	2	47	Frank Sanders	Arizona Cardinals	WR
1995	5	155	Mike Pelton	Kansas City Chiefs	DT
1995	5	159	Gary Walker	Houston Oilers	DE
1996	1	10	Willie Anderson	Cincinnati Bengals	T
1996	4	102	Stephen Davis	Washington Redskins	RB
1996	5	162	Dell McGee	Arizona Cardinals	DB
1997	7	212	Mark Smith	Arizona Cardinals	DE
1998	1	13	Takeo Spikes	Cincinnati Bengals	LB
1998	1	27	Victor Riley	Kansas City Chiefs	T
1998	6	180	Fred Beasley	San Francisco 49ers	RB
1998	6	182	Kevin McLeod	Jacksonville Jaguars	RB
1999	3	82	Karsten Bailey	Seattle Seahawks	WR
1999	4	114	Brad Ware	Tennessee Titans	DB
2000	2	59	Marcus Washington	Indianapolis Colts	DE
2000	4	113	Leonardo Carson	San Diego Chargers	DE
2000	6	181	Quinton Reese	Detroit Lions	DE
2000	6	182	Jeno James	Carolina Panthers	G
2001	3	82	Heath Evans	Seattle Seahawks	RB
2001	4	100	Rudi Johnson	Cincinnati Bengals	RB
2001	7	209	Alex Lincoln	San Francisco 49ers	LB
2002	1	30	Kendall Simmons	Pittsburgh Steelers	G
2002	2	46	Tim Carter	New York Giants	WR
2002	7	215	Mike Pucillo	Buffalo Bills	G
2004	2	33	Karlos Dansby	Arizona Cardinals	LB
2004	2	48	Dontarrious Thomas	Minnesota Vikings	LB
2004	4	97	Reggie Torbor	New York Giants	DE
2004	6	195	Jeris McIntyre	Kansas City Chiefs	WR
2005	1	2	Ronnie Brown	Miami Dolphins	RB
2005	1	5	Cadillac Williams	Tampa Bay Buccaneers	RB
2005	1	9	Carlos Rogers	Washington Redskins	DB
2005	1	25	Jason Campbell	Washington Redskins	QB
2005	7	224	Jeremiah Ratliff	Dallas Cowboys	DE
2006	2	50	Marcus McNeill	San Diego Chargers	T
2006	7	233	Devin Aromashodu	Miami Dolphins	WR
2006	7	237	Stanley McClover	Carolina Panthers	DE
2006	7	249	Ben Obomanu	Seattle Seahawks	WR
2007	1	29	Ben Grubbs	Baltimore Ravens	G
2007	2	49	Kenny Irons	Cincinnati Bengals	RB
2007	5	161	Will Herring	Seattle Seahawks	LB
2007	6	194	David Irons	Atlanta Falcons	DB
2007	6	197	Courtney Taylor	Seattle Seahawks	WR
2008	2	52	Quentin Groves	Jacksonville Jaguars	DE
2008	2	60	Pat Lee	Green Bay Packers	DB
2008	3	77	Pat Sims	Cincinnati Bengals	DT
2008	4	129	Jonathan Wilhite	New England Patriots	DB
2008	7	230	King Dunlap	Philadelphia Eagles	T
2009	2	62	Sen'Derrick Marks	Tennessee Titans	DT
2009	3	92	Jerraud Powers	Indianapolis Colts	DB
2009	4	133	Tyronne Green	San Diego Chargers	DT
2010	2	58	Ben Tate	Houston Texans	RB
2010	5	138	Walter McFadden	Oakland Raiders	DB
2011	1	1	Cam Newton	Carolina Panthers	QB
2011	1	13	Nick Fairley	Detroit Lions	DT
2011	7	212	Zach Clayton	Tennessee Titans	DT
2011	7	244	Lee Ziemba	Carolina Panthers	T
2012	4	131	Brandon Mosley	New York Giants	T
2013	3	88	Corey Lemonier	San Francisco 49ers	DE
2014	1	2	Greg Robinson	St. Louis Rams	T
2014	1	23	Dee Ford	Kansas City Chiefs	DE
2014	3	75	Tre Mason	St. Louis Rams	RB
2014	6	211	Jay Prosch	Houston Texans	RB
2015	3	87	Sammie Coates	Pittsburgh Steelers	WR
2015	4	100	Angelo Blackson	Tennessee Titans	DT
2015	4	113	Gabe Wright	Detroit Lions	DT
2015	5	157	C. J. Uzomah	Cincinnati Bengals	TE
2015	5	174	Cameron Artis-Payne	Carolina Panthers	RB
2016	3	76	Shon Coleman	Cleveland Browns	T
2016	4	114	Ricardo Louis	Cleveland Browns	WR
2016	6	196	Blake Countess	Philadelphia Eagles	DB
2017	3	93	Montravius Adams	Green Bay Packers	DT
2017	4	116	Carl Lawson	Cincinnati Bengals	DE
2017	6	208	Rudy Ford	Arizona Cardinals	DB
2017	7	235	Joshua Holsey	Washington Redskins	DB
2018	2	37	Braden Smith	Indianapolis Colts	G
2018	2	43	Kerryon Johnson	Detroit Lions	RB
2018	2	63	Carlton Davis	Tampa Bay Buccaneers	DB
2018	5	167	Daniel Carlson	Minnesota Vikings	K
2019	3	94	Jamel Dean	Tampa Bay Buccaneers	DB
2019	4	133	Jarrett Stidham	New England Patriots	QB
2019	5	171	Darius Slayton	New York Giants	WR
2019	6	210	Deshaun Davis	Cincinnati Bengals	LB
2019	7	233	Chandler Cox	Miami Dolphins	RB
2019	7	235	Dontavius Russell	Jacksonville Jaguars	DT
2020	1	7	Derrick Brown	Carolina Panthers	DT
2020	1	30	Noah Igbinoghene	Miami Dolphins	CB
2020	2	47	Marlon Davidson	Atlanta Falcons	DE
2020	4	145	Jack Driscoll	Philadelphia Eagles	T
2020	5	157	Daniel Thomas	Jacksonville Jaguars	DB
2020	6	210	Prince Tega Wanogho	Philadelphia Eagles	T
2021	3	91	Anthony Schwartz	Cleveland Browns	WR
2021	5	146	Jamien Sherwood	New York Jets	DB
2021	5	176	K. J. Britt	Tampa Bay Buccaneers	LB
2021	6	219	Seth Williams	Denver Broncos	WR
2022	2	35	Roger McCreary	Tennessee Titans	DB
2023	2	37	Derick Hall	Seattle Seahawks	LB
2023	3	88	Tank Bigsby	Jacksonville Jaguars	RB
2023	4	116	Colby Wooden	Green Bay Packers	DE
2023	5	168	Owen Pappoe	Arizona Cardinals	LB
2023	6	207	Anders Carlson	Green Bay Packers	K
2024	5	136	Nehemiah Pritchett	Seattle Seahawks	DB
2024	5	164	Jaylin Simpson	Indianapolis Colts	DB
2024	6	192	D. J. James	Seattle Seahawks	DB
2024	7	244	Justin Rogers	Dallas Cowboys	DT
2024	7	247	Marcus Harris	Houston Texans	DT
2025	4	117	Jarquez Hunter	Los Angeles Rams	RB
2025	4	158	KeAndre Lambert-Smith	Los Angeles Chargers	WR
2025	5	194	Jalen McLeod	Jacksonville Jaguars	LB
2026	1	31	Keldric Faulk	Tennessee Titans	DE
2026	3	67	Keyron Crawford	Las Vegas Raiders	DE
2026	4	128	Connor Lew	Cincinnati Bengals	C
2026	4	132	Jeremiah Wright	New Orleans Saints	G
2026	6	186	Bobby Jamison-Travis	New York Giants	DT

== Notes ==
- Chris Woods was part of the 1984 NFL supplemental draft of USFL and CFL players.

== Notable undrafted players ==
Note: No drafts held before 1920

Debut year	Player name	Debut NFL/AFL team	Position	Notes
1962	Carl Mobley	Denver Broncos	QB	—
1984	Al Del Greco	Miami Dolphins	K	—
1984	Ed West	Green Bay Packers	TE	—
1986	Ron Middleton	Atlanta Falcons	TE	—
1988	Curtis Stewart	Chicago Bears	RB	—
1989	Alvin Mitchell	Tampa Bay Buccaneers	RB	—
1994	Calvin Jackson	Miami Dolphins	CB	—
1994	Tony Richardson	Dallas Cowboys	FB	—
1995	Chris Shelling	Cincinnati Bengals	DB	—
1995	Willie Whitehead	San Francisco 49ers	DE	—
1999	Robert Baker	Miami Dolphins	WR	—
2003	Mark Brown	New York Jets	LB	—
2003	Roderick Hood	Philadelphia Eagles	CB	—
2003	Travaris Robinson	Atlanta Falcons	S	—
2022	Zakoby McClain	Baltimore Ravens	LB	—
2022	Smoke Monday	New Orleans Saints	S	—
2022	Demetris Robertson	Seattle Seahawks	WR	—
2023	Shedrick Jackson	Arizona Cardinals	WR	—
2023	John Samuel Shenker	Las Vegas Raiders	TE	—
2024	Gunner Britton	Buffalo Bills	G	—
2025	Rivaldo Fairweather	Dallas Cowboys	TE	—
2025	Dorian Mausi	Minnesota Vikings	LB	—
2025	Payton Thorne	Cincinnati Bengals	QB	—
2026	Mason Murphy	Chicago Bears	OT	—
