= Auburn Tigers football statistical leaders =

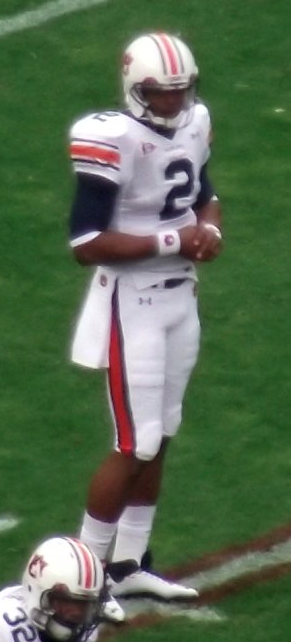
Cam Newton set the single-season school passing touchdowns record in 2010, his only season with the Tigers.

The Auburn Tigers football statistical leaders are individual statistical leaders of the Auburn Tigers football program in various categories, including passing, rushing, receiving, total offense, defensive stats, and kicking. Within those areas, the lists identify single-game, Single season and career leaders. The Tigers represent Auburn University in the NCAA's Southeastern Conference.

Although Auburn began competing in intercollegiate football in 1892, the school's official record book considers the "modern era" to have begun in 1947. Records from before this year are often incomplete and inconsistent, and they are generally not included in these lists.

These lists are dominated by more recent players for several reasons:

- In 1947, seasons increased from 10 games to 11 games in length. In 2006, seasons increased from 11 games to 12 games in length.
- The NCAA didn't allow freshmen to play varsity football until 1972 (with the exception of the World War II years), allowing players to have four-year careers.
- Bowl games only began counting toward Single season and career statistics in 2002. The Tigers have played in 14 bowl games since this decision.
- The Tigers have had two seasons, 2010 and 2013, in which the Tigers run a high-octane offense that racked up 6,989 and 7,018 offensive yards, respectively. In fact, eight of the Tigers' ten seasons with the highest offensive output have come since 2000 under head coaches Tommy Tuberville, Gene Chizik, and Gus Malzahn.

These lists are updated through the 2025 season.

== Passing ==
=== Passing yards ===
Career
Rank	Player	Yards	Years
1	Stan White	8,016	1990 1991 1992 1993
2	Jason Campbell	7,299	2001 2002 2003 2004
3	Bo Nix	7,251	2019 2020 2021
4	Brandon Cox	6,959	2004 2005 2006 2007
5	Pat Sullivan	6,284	1969 1970 1971
6	Dameyune Craig	6,026	1994 1995 1996 1997
7	Jarrett Stidham	5,952	2017 2018
8	Patrick Nix	4,957	1992 1993 1994 1995
9	Reggie Slack	4,697	1986 1987 1988 1989
10	Nick Marshall	4,508	2013 2014

Single season
Rank	Player	Yards	Year
1	Dameyune Craig	3,277	1997
2	Jarrett Stidham	3,158	2017
3	Cam Newton	2,854	2010
4	Jarrett Stidham	2,794	2018
5	Payton Thorne	2,713	2024
6	Jason Campbell	2,700	2004
7	Pat Sullivan	2,586	1970
8	Patrick Nix	2,574	1995
9	Bo Nix	2,542	2019
10	Nick Marshall	2,532	2014

Single game
Rank	Player	Yards	Year	Opponent
1	Nick Marshall	456	2014	Alabama
2	Ben Leard	416	1999	Georgia
3	Ben Leard	394	2000	Michigan
4	Dameyune Craig	394	1996	Mississippi State
5	Patrick Nix	387	1995	Arkansas
6	Daniel Cobb	381	2001	Louisiana Tech
7	Bo Nix	377	2021	Mississippi State
8	Jason Campbell	374	2004	Tennessee
9	Jarrett Stidham	373	2018	Purdue
10	Patrick Nix	372	1995	Ole Miss

=== Passing touchdowns ===
Career
Rank	Player	TDs	Years
1	Pat Sullivan	53	1969 1970 1971
2	Jason Campbell	45	2001 2002 2003 2004
3	Brandon Cox	42	2004 2005 2006 2007
4	Stan White	40	1990 1991 1992 1993
5	Dameyune Craig	39	1994 1995 1996 1997
	Bo Nix	39	2019 2020 2021
7	Payton Thorne	37	2023 2024
8	Jarrett Stidham	36	2017 2018
9	Nick Marshall	34	2013 2014
10	Patrick Nix	31	1992 1993 1994 1995

Single season
Rank	Player	TDs	Year
1	Cam Newton	30	2010
2	Chris Todd	22	2009
3	Payton Thorne	21	2024
4	Pat Sullivan	20	1971
	Jason Campbell	20	2004
	Nick Marshall	20	2014
7	Dameyune Craig	18	1997
	Jarrett Stidham	18	2017
	Jarrett Stidham	18	2018
10	Pat Sullivan	17	1970

== Rushing ==
=== Rushing yards ===
Career
Rank	Player	Yards	Years
1	Bo Jackson	4,303	1982 1983 1984 1985
2	Carnell Williams	3,831	2001 2002 2003 2004
3	James Brooks	3,523	1977 1978 1979 1980
4	Jarquez Hunter	3,371	2021 2022 2023 2024
5	Joe Cribbs	3,368	1976 1977 1978 1979
6	Ben Tate	3,321	2006 2007 2008 2009
7	Tre Mason	2,979	2011 2012 2013
8	Tank Bigsby	2,903	2020 2021 2022
9	Stephen Davis	2,811	1993 1994 1995
10	Brent Fullwood	2,789	1983 1984 1985 1986

Single season
Rank	Player	Yards	Year
1	Tre Mason	1,816	2013
2	Bo Jackson	1,786	1985
3	Cameron Artis-Payne	1,608	2014
4	Rudi Johnson	1,567	2000
5	Cam Newton	1,473	2010
6	Brent Fullwood	1,391	1986
	Kerryon Johnson	1,391	2017
8	Ben Tate	1,362	2009
9	James Brooks	1,314	1980
10	Carnell Williams	1,307	2003

Single game
Rank	Player	Yards	Year	Opponent
1	Curtis Kuykendall	307	1944	Miami (FL)
2	Tre Mason	304	2013	Missouri
3	Bo Jackson	290	1985	Southwestern Louisiana
4	Jarquez Hunter	278	2024	Kentucky
5	Bo Jackson	256	1983	Alabama
6	Joe Cribbs	250	1978	Georgia
7	Rudi Johnson	249	2000	Louisiana Tech
8	Stephen Davis	246	1994	Arkansas
9	Bo Jackson	242	1985	Georgia Tech
10	Bo Jackson	240	1985	Ole Miss

=== Rushing touchdowns ===
Career
Rank	Player	TDs	Years
1	Carnell Williams	45	2001 2002 2003 2004
2	Bo Jackson	43	1982 1983 1984 1985
3	Joe Cribbs	34	1976 1977 1978 1979
4	Tre Mason	32	2011 2012 2013
	Kerryon Johnson	32	2015 2016 2017
6	Stephen Davis	30	1993 1994 1995
7	Ronnie Brown	29	2000 2001 2002 2003 2004
8	Tank Bigsby	25	2020 2021 2022
	Jarquez Hunter	25	2021 2022 2023 2024
10	James Brooks	24	1977 1978 1979 1980
	Brent Fullwood	24	1983 1984 1985 1986
	Ben Tate	24	2006 2007 2008 2009
	Onterio McCalebb	24	2009 2010 2011 2012

Single season
Rank	Player	TDs	Year
1	Tre Mason	23	2013
2	Cam Newton	20	2010
3	Kerryon Johnson	18	2017
4	Bo Jackson	17	1985
	Carnell Williams	17	2003
6	Joe Cribbs	16	1978
7	Joe Cribbs	14	1979
	Stephen Davis	14	1995
9	Rudi Johnson	13	2000
	Ronnie Brown	13	2002
	Cameron Artis-Payne	13	2014
	Peyton Barber	13	2015

Single game
Rank	Player	TDs	Year	Opponent
1	Carnell Williams	6	2003	Mississippi State
2	Kerryon Johnson	5	2017	Missouri

== Receiving ==
=== Receptions ===
Career
Rank	Player	Rec	Years
1	Ryan Davis	178	2016 2017 2018
2	Courtney Taylor	153	2003 2004 2005 2006
3	Karsten Bailey	150	1995 1996 1997 1998
4	Terry Beasley	141	1969 1970 1971
5	Tyrone Goodson	136	1994 1995 1996 1997
	Eli Stove	136	2016 2017 2018 2019 2020
7	Seth Williams	132	2018 2019 2020
8	Emory Blake	128	2009 2010 2011 2012
9	Frank Sanders	121	1991 1992 1993 1994
10	Anthony Schwartz	117	2018 2019 2020

Single season
Rank	Player	Rec	Year
1	Ryan Davis	84	2017
2	Ryan Davis	69	2018
3	Darvin Adams	60	2009
4	Seth Williams	59	2019
5	Frank Sanders	58	1994
	Willie Gosha	58	1995
	Eric Singleton Jr.	58	2025
8	Ronney Daniels	56	1999
	Cam Coleman	56	2025
10	Terry Beasley	55	1971

Single game
Rank	Player	Rec	Year	Opponent
1	Willie Gosha	17	1995	Arkansas
2	Seth Williams	13	2019	Georgia
3	Ryan Davis	12	2018	Georgia
	Darvin Adams	12	2009	Northwestern
5	Terry Beasley	11	1971	Southern Miss
	Ryan Davis	11	2017	Alabama
	Eric Singleton Jr.	11	2025	Vanderbilt
8	Thomas Bailey	10	1994	Florida
	Tyrone Goodson	10	1996	Mississippi State
	Willie Gosha	10	1996	Army
	Ronney Daniels	10	1999	Central
	Emory Blake	10	2012	Arkansas
	Ricardo Louis	10	2015	Jacksonville State
	Anthony Schwartz	10	2020	Arkansas
	Cam Coleman	10	2025	Vanderbilt

=== Receiving yards ===
Career
Rank	Player	Yards	Years
1	Terry Beasley	2,507	1969 1970 1971
2	Tyrone Goodson	2,283	1994 1995 1996 1997
3	Karsten Bailey	2,174	1995 1996 1997 1998
4	Seth Williams	2,124	2018 2019 2020
5	Courtney Taylor	2,098	2003 2004 2005 2006
6	Emory Blake	2,022	2009 2010 2011 2012
7	Frank Sanders	1,998	1991 1992 1993 1994
8	Darvin Adams	1,978	2008 2009 2010
9	Freddy Weygand	1,946	1985 1986 1987 1988
10	Lawyer Tillman	1,808	1985 1986 1987 1988

Single season
Rank	Player	Yards	Year
1	Ronney Daniels	1,068	1999
2	Terry Beasley	1,051	1970
3	Darvin Adams	997	2009
4	KeAndre Lambert Smith	981	2024
5	Darvin Adams	963	2010
6	Frank Sanders	910	1994
7	Tyrone Goodson	906	1997
8	Sammie Coates	902	2013
9	Terry Beasley	846	1971
10	Frank Sanders	842	1993

Single game
Rank	Player	Yards	Year	Opponent
1	Alexander Wright	263	1989	Pacific
2	Ronney Daniels	249	1999	Georgia
3	Willie Gosha	222	1995	Arkansas
4	Darvin Adams	217	2010	South Carolina
5	Sammie Coates	206	2014	Alabama
6	Terry Beasley	194	1971	Kentucky
7	Terry Beasley	176	1970	Florida
8	Frank Sanders	175	1994	
9	Frank Sanders	173	1994	East Carolina
10	Robert Baker	161	1996	Ole Miss
	Seth Williams	161	2019	Mississippi State

=== Receiving touchdowns ===
Career
Rank	Player	TDs	Years
1	Terry Beasley	29	1969 1970 1971
2	Ben Obomanu	18	2002 2003 2004 2005
3	Karsten Bailey	17	1995 1996 1997 1998
	Darvin Adams	17	2008 2009 2010
	Seth Williams	17	2018 2019 2020
6	Emory Blake	16	2009 2010 2011 2012
7	Byron Franklin	15	1977 1978 1979 1980
	Frank Sanders	15	1991 1992 1993 1994
9	Lawyer Tillman	14	1985 1986 1987 1988
	Philip Lutzenkirchen	14	2009 2010 2011 2012

Single season
Rank	Player	TDs	Year
1	Terry Beasley	12	1971
2	Terry Beasley	11	1970
3	Darvin Adams	10	2009
4	Byron Franklin	9	1980
	Ronney Daniels	9	1999
6	Emory Blake	8	2010
	Seth Williams	8	2019
	Keandre Lambert Smith	8	2024
	Cam Coleman	8	2024

== Total offense ==
Total offense is the sum of passing and rushing statistics. It does not include receiving or returns.

=== Total offense yards ===
Career
Rank	Player	Yards	Years
1	Bo Nix	8,120	2019 2020 2021
2	Stan White	7,920	1990 1991 1992 1993
3	Jason Campbell	7,606	2001 2002 2003 2004
4	Pat Sullivan	6,843	1969 1970 1971
5	Brandon Cox	6,543	2004 2005 2006 2007
6	Dameyune Craig	6,455	1994 1995 1996 1997
7	Nick Marshall	6,374	2013 2014
8	Jarrett Stidham	6,106	2017 2018
9	Payton Thorne	5,266	2023 2024
10	Patrick Nix	4,957	1992 1993 1994 1995

Single season
Rank	Player	Yards	Year
1	Cam Newton	4,327	2010
2	Nick Marshall	3,330	2014
3	Jarrett Stidham	3,311	2017
4	Dameyune Craig	3,277	1997
5	Nick Marshall	3,044	2013
6	Payton Thorne	2,996	2024
7	Bo Nix	2,855	2019
8	Bo Nix	2,803	2020
9	Jarrett Stidham	2,795	2018
10	Jason Campbell	2,730	2004

Single game
Rank	Player	Yards	Year	Opponent
1	Nick Marshall	505	2014	Alabama
2	Dameyune Craig	445	1996	Army
3	Ashton Daniels	442	2025	Vanderbilt
4	Jason Campbell	431	2004	Tennessee
5	Patrick Nix	422	1995	Arkansas
6	Dameyune Craig	417	1997	Central Florida
7	Cam Newton	408	2010	Kentucky
	Cam Newton	408	2010	South Carolina
9	Dameyune Craig	405	1997	Louisiana Tech
	Payton Thorne	405	2023	Samford

=== Touchdowns responsible for ===
"Touchdowns responsible for" is the NCAA's official term for combined passing and rushing touchdowns.

Career
Rank	Player	TDs	Years
1	Pat Sullivan	71	1969 1970 1971
2	Dameyune Craig	58	1994 1995 1996 1997
3	Nick Marshall	57	2013 2014
4	Bo Nix	57	2019 2020 2021
5	Jason Campbell	54	2001 2002 2003 2004
6	Stan White	51	1990 1991 1992 1993
7	Cam Newton	50	2010
8	Carnell Williams	46	2001 2002 2003 2004
	Brandon Cox	46	2004 2005 2006 2007
10	Jarrett Stidham	43	2017 2018

Single season
Rank	Player	TDs	Year
1	Cam Newton	50	2010
2	Nick Marshall	31	2014
3	Pat Sullivan	26	1970
	Nick Marshall	26	2013
5	Dameyune Craig	24	1996
6	Pat Sullivan	23	1969
	Jason Campbell	23	2004
	Bo Nix	23	2019
9	Payton Thorne	23	2024
10	Pat Sullivan	22	1971
	Dameyune Craig	22	1997
	Chris Todd	22	2009
	Jarrett Stidham	22	2017

== Defense ==
=== Interceptions ===
Career
Rank	Player	Ints	Years
1	Buddy McClinton	18	1967 1968 1969
2	Dave Beck	14	1970 1971 1972
3	Don Webb	13	1967 1968 1969
	Brian Robinson	13	1992 1993 1994
5	David Langner	12	1971 1972 1973
	David King	12	1981 1982 1983 1984
7	Bobby Freeman	11	1951 1952 1953 1954
	Larry Willingham	11	1968 1969 1970
	Jim McKinney	11	1972 1973 1974
	Clifford Toney	11	1978 1979 1980

Single season
Rank	Player	Ints	Year
1	Buddy McClinton	9	1969
2	David Langner	8	1972
	Brian Robinson	8	1994
4	Larry Willingham	7	1969
5	Junior Rosegreen	6	2004

=== Tackles ===
Career
Rank	Player	Tackles	Years
1	Freddie Smith	528	1976 1977 1978 1979
2	Gregg Carr	453	1981 1982 1983 1984
3	Darrel Crawford	424	1988 1989 1990 1991
4	Anthony Harris	400	1992 1993 1994 1995
5	Quentin Riggins	398	1986 1987 1988 1989
6	Chris Martin	374	1979 1980 1981 1982
7	Tracy Rocker	354	1985 1986 1987 1988
8	Dontarrious Thomas	351	2000 2001 2002 2003
9	Marcellus Mostella	336	1993 1994 1995 1996
10	Takeo Spikes	331	1995 1996 1997

Single season
Rank	Player	Tackles	Year
1	Freddie Smith	193	1977
2	Kurt Crain	168	1987
3	Quentin Riggins	165	1989
4	Freddie Smith	162	1979
5	Kurt Crain	156	1986
6	Darrel Crawford	153	1991
7	Ben Thomas	141	1984
8	Gregg Carr	139	1984
9	Gregg Carr	136	1983
	Takeo Spikes	136	1997

Single game
Rank	Player	Tackles	Year	Opponent
1	Kurt Crain	26	1986	Georgia
2	Freddie Smith	24	1976	Tennessee
3	Freddie Smith	23	1977	Auburn
	Chris Martin	23	1980	Alabama
	Quentin Riggins	23	1989	Florida
	Mike Pelton	23	1991	Vanderbilt
7	Freddie Smith	22	1976	Baylor
	Freddie Smith	23	1977	Arizona
	Freddie Smith	22	1979	Auburn
	Darrel Crawford	22	1989	Alabama

=== Sacks ===
Career
Rank	Player	Sacks	Years
1	Gerald Robinson	26.0	1982 1983 1984 1985
	Quentin Groves	26.0	2004 2005 2006 2007
3	Antonio Coleman	24.5	2006 2007 2008 2009
4	Tracy Rocker	21.0	1985 1986 1987 1988
	Craig Ogletree	21.0	1986 1987 1988 1989
6	Dee Ford	20.5	2009 2010 2011 2012 2013
7	Derick Hall	19.0	2019 2020 2021 2022
8	Reggie Torbor	18.5	2000 2001 2002 2003
9	Willie Whitehead	17.0	1991 1992 1993 1994
	Leonardo Carson	17.0	1996 1997 1998 1999
	Corey Lemonier	17.0	2010 2011 2012
	Marlon Davidson	17.0	2016 2017 2018 2019

Single season
Rank	Player	Sacks	Year
1	Nick Fairley	12.0	2010
2	Kevin Greene	11.0	1984
	Craig Ogletree	11.0	1989
	Gary Walker	11.0	1994
5	Dee Ford	11.0	2013
6	Gerald Robinson	10.0	1985
	Mike Pelton	10.0	1994
	Antonio Coleman	10.0	2009
9	Reggie Torbor	10.0	2003
	Jeff Holland	10.0	2017
	Quentin Groves	10.0	2006

== Kicking ==
=== Field goals made ===
Career
Rank	Player	FGs	Years
1	Daniel Carlson	92	2014 2015 2016 2017
2	Anders Carlson	79	2018 2019 2020 2021 2022
3	Wes Byrum	60	2007 2008 2009 2010
4	John Vaughn	50	2003 2004 2005 2006
5	Win Lyle	45	1987 1988 1989
	Damon Duval	45	1999 2000 2001 2002
7	Al Del Greco	42	1980 1981 1982 1983
8	Alex McPherson	40	2022 2023 2024 2025
9	Cody Parkey	39	2010 2011 2012 2013
10	Jorge Portela	38	1977 1978 1979

Single season
Rank	Player	FGs	Year
1	Daniel Carlson	28	2016
2	Daniel Carlson	23	2015
	Daniel Carlson	23	2017
4	Scott Etheridge	22	1992
5	John Vaughn	20	2006
	Anders Carlson	20	2020
	Alex McPherson	20	2025
8	Daniel Carlson	18	2014
	Anders Carlson	18	2019
10	Jim Von Wyl	17	1990
	Wes Byrum	17	2007
	Wes Byrum	17	2010

Single game
Rank	Player	FGs	Year	Opponent
1	Al Del Greco	6	1982	Kentucky
	Daniel Carlson	6	2016	LSU
	Alex McPherson	6	2025	Arkansas

=== Field goal percentage ===
Career
Rank	Player	FG%	Years
1	Alex McPherson	88.9%	2022 2023 2024 2025
2	Daniel Carlson	80.7%	2014 2015 2016 2017
3	Scott Etheridge	79.1%	1992 1993
4	Matt Hawkins	78.8%	1994 1995
5	Win Lyle	76.3%	1987 1988 1989
6	Wes Byrum	75.0%	2007 2008 2009 2010
7	Cody Parkey	73.6%	2010 2011 2012 2013
8	Jaret Holmes	73.0%	1996 1997
9	John Vaughn	72.5%	2003 2004 2005 2006
10	Anders Carlson	71.8%	2018 2019 2020 2021 2022

Single season
Rank	Player	FG%	Year
1	Alex McPherson	100.0%	2023
2	Wes Byrum	93.8%	2009
3	Anders Carlson	90.9%	2020
4	Daniel Carlson	87.5%	2016
5	Alex McPherson	87.0%	2025
6	Matt Hawkins	86.7%	1995
7	Daniel Carlson	85.2%	2015
8	Win Lyle	84.2%	1989
9	Gardner Jett	83.3%	1970
	John Vaughn	83.3%	1986
