= Brian Robinson (safety) =

American football player (born c.1974)

No. 20
- Position: Safety

Career information
- College: Auburn (1993–1994)
- NFL draft: 1995: undrafted

Awards and highlights
- Consensus All-American (1994); First-team All-SEC (1994)

Brian Robinson (born c. 1974) is an American former football player. He played at the safety position for the Auburn Tigers football team in 1993 and 1994. As a junior in 1994, he led the Southeastern Conference with eight interceptions, including three against a Florida team that was ranked nationally No. 1 at the time. Robinson was a consensus selection as a defensive back on the 1994 College Football All-America Team. He left Auburn after his junior year to participate in the 1995 NFL draft, but he was not selected. The Associated Press in April 1995 reported that the omission of Robinson from the draft was "not totally unexpected" after he tested positive for marijuana and performed poorly at the NFL Scouting Combine.
