= Ryan Davis (wide receiver) =

American gridiron football player (born 1997)

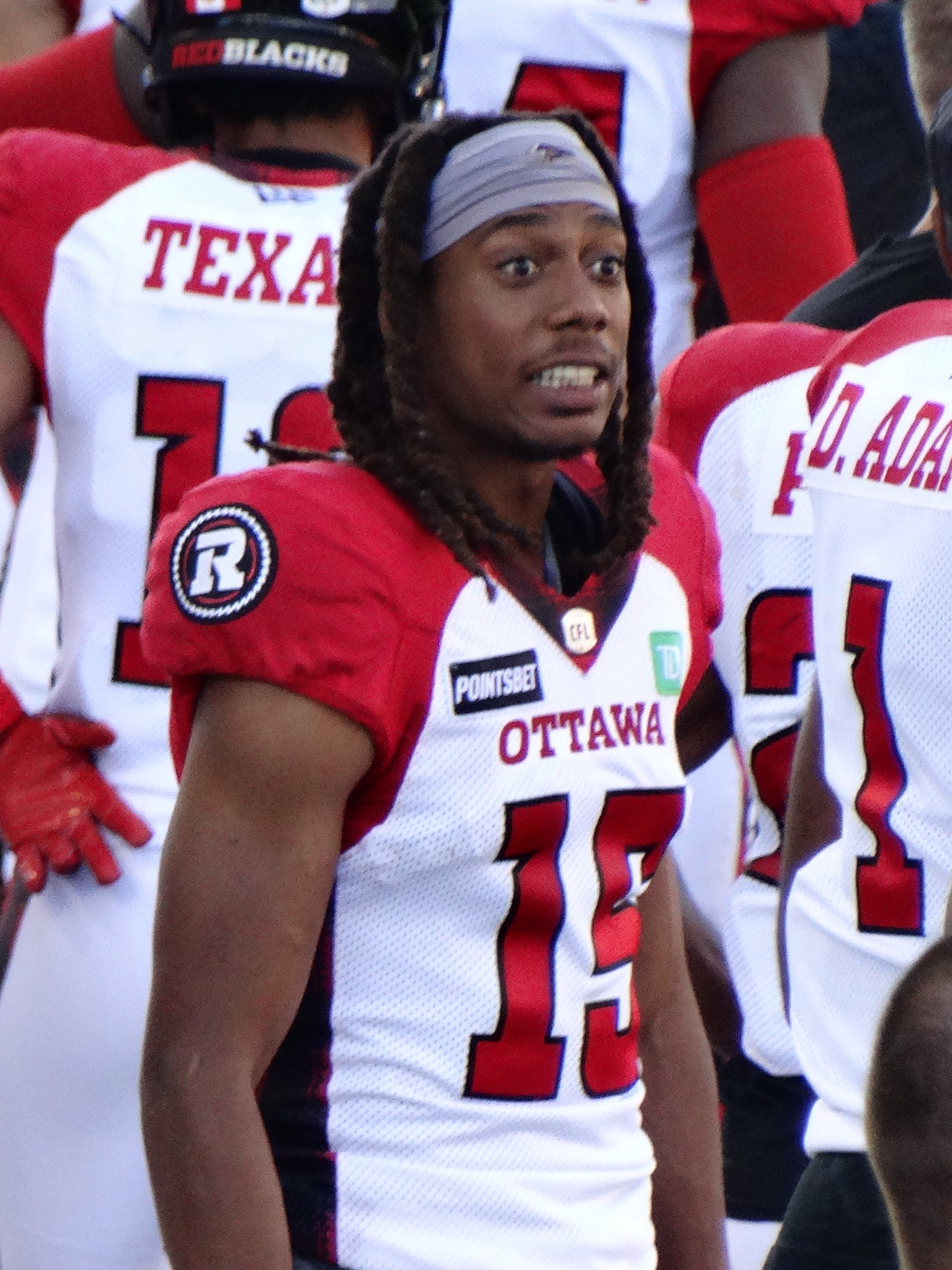
- Davis with the Ottawa Redblacks in 2022

Profile
- Position: Wide receiver

Personal information
- Born: April 12, 1997 (age 29); St. Petersburg, Florida, U.S.
- Listed height: 5 ft 10 in (1.78 m)
- Listed weight: 186 lb (84 kg)

Career information
- High school: Lakewood (St. Petersburg, Florida)
- College: Auburn
- NFL draft: 2019: undrafted

Career history
- New England Patriots (2019)*; Tampa Bay Vipers (2020); Ottawa Redblacks (2021–2022); Vegas Vipers (2024)*
- * Offseason or practice squad member only

Career CFL statistics
- Receptions: 119
- Receiving yards: 895
- Touchdowns: 2
- Stats at CFL.ca

Ryan Davis (born April 12, 1997) is an American professional football wide receiver. He played college football at Auburn. He has been a member of the New England Patriots of the National Football League (NFL), the Tampa Bay Vipers of the XFL, and the Ottawa Redblacks of the Canadian Football League (CFL).

== College career ==
Davis played at Auburn University from 2015 to 2018. While there he set the school record for career receptions with 178.

== Professional career ==
Pre-draft measurables
Height	Weight	Arm length	Hand span	Wingspan	40-yard dash	10-yard split	20-yard split	20-yard shuttle	Three-cone drill	Vertical jump	Broad jump	Bench press
5 ft 9 7/8 in (1.77 m)	189 lb (86 kg)	30 7/8 in (0.78 m)	9 1/4 in (0.23 m)	6 ft 1 in (1.85 m)	4.63 s	1.63 s	2.71 s	4.23 s	7.09 s	35.0 in (0.89 m)	10 ft 4 in (3.15 m)	12 reps
All values from NFL Combine/Pro Day

Davis signed with the New England Patriots as an undrafted free agent in 2019. He was released by the Patriots that year before the season.

In 2020, Davis played for the Tampa Bay Vipers of the XFL. He played in three games for the Vipers, catching two passes for six yards.

Davis signed with the Ottawa Redblacks of the CFL in 2021. Davis led the team with 55 receptions for 589 yards and also scored two touchdowns. He also contributed 9 carries for 43 yards. Davis was a nominee for CFL 'Most Outstanding Rookie' of the 2021 season. On February 14, 2023, Davis became a free agent.

After participating in the XFL Combine, Davis's league playing rights were acquired by the Vegas Vipers on August 9, 2023. He signed with the Vipers on October 18, 2023. The Vipers folded when the XFL and USFL merged to create the United Football League (UFL).
