= Karsten Bailey =

American football player (born 1977)

No. 83, 85
- Position: Wide receiver

Personal information
- Born: April 26, 1977 (age 49); Newnan, Georgia, U.S.
- Listed height: 5 ft 11 in (1.80 m)
- Listed weight: 201 lb (91 kg)

Career information
- High school: Sharpsburg (GA) East Coweta
- College: Auburn
- NFL draft: 1999: 3rd round, 82nd overall pick

Career history
- Seattle Seahawks (1999–2000); Green Bay Packers (2002–2003); Saskatchewan Roughriders (2004–2005)

Career NFL statistics
- Receptions: 9
- Receiving yards: 88
- Touchdowns: 1
- Stats at Pro Football Reference

Karsten Mario Bailey (born April 26, 1977) is an American former professional football player who was a wide receiver in the National Football League (NFL). He was selected by the Seattle Seahawks in the third round of the 1999 NFL draft.

He played college football for the Auburn Tigers.

Bailey also played for the Green Bay Packers.
