= Zeke Smith =

American football player (1936–2016)

No. 61, 52, 70
- Positions: Guard, linebacker, defensive end

Personal information
- Born: September 29, 1936; Walker Springs, Alabama, U.S.
- Died: July 22, 2016 (aged 79); Trussville, Alabama, U.S.
- Listed height: 6 ft 2 in (1.88 m)
- Listed weight: 235 lb (107 kg)

Career information
- High school: Uniontown (AL)
- College: Auburn (1957–1958)
- NFL draft: 1959: 4th round, 48th overall pick
- AFL draft: 1960: 1st round

Career history
- Baltimore Colts (1960); New York Giants (1961); Toronto Argonauts (1962); Edmonton Eskimos (1963)

Awards and highlights
- National champion (1957); Outland Trophy (1958); Consensus All-American (1958); First-team All-American (1959); 2× First-team All-SEC (1958, 1959)

Career NFL statistics
- Games played: 24
- Stats at Pro Football Reference

Roger Duane "Zeke" Smith (September 29, 1936 – July 22, 2016) was an American professional football player who was a guard in the National Football League (NFL) for the Baltimore Colts and the New York Giants. He played college football at Auburn where he was awarded the Outland Trophy in 1958. His banner, along with four other Auburn greats - Bo Jackson, Pat Sullivan, Tracy Rocker and Carlos Rogers, is hanging outside Jordan–Hare Stadium in his honor. He was drafted in the fourth round of the 1959 NFL draft.

Smith died on July 22, 2016. He was 79 years old at the time of his death.
