= Lawyer Tillman =

American football player (born 1966)

No. 85
- Position: Wide receiver

Personal information
- Born: May 20, 1966 (age 60); Mobile, Alabama, U.S.
- Listed height: 6 ft 5 in (1.96 m)
- Listed weight: 252 lb (114 kg)

Career information
- High school: LeFlore High School
- College: Auburn
- NFL draft: 1989: 2nd round, 31st overall pick

Career history
- Cleveland Browns (1989–1993); Carolina Panthers (1995)

Awards and highlights
- First-team All-SEC (1987)

Career NFL statistics
- Receptions: 38
- Receiving yards: 658
- Receiving touchdowns: 3
- Stats at Pro Football Reference

Lawyer James Tillman (born May 20, 1966) is an American former professional football player who was a wide receiver in the National Football League (NFL) for the Cleveland Browns and Carolina Panthers. He was selected by the Browns in the second round of the 1989 NFL draft after the Browns traded up to acquire him. Tillman played college football for the Auburn Tigers. One of his more notable plays was an end-around reverse to beat rival Alabama in the 1986 Iron Bowl.
