= David Langner (American football) =

American football player (1951–2014)

Profile
- Position: Defensive back

Personal information
- Born: November 8, 1951; Birmingham, Alabama, U.S.
- Died: April 26, 2014 (aged 62); Tuscaloosa, Alabama, U.S.
- Listed height: 5 ft 9 in (1.75 m)
- Listed weight: 170 lb (77 kg)

Career information
- College: Auburn University
- NFL draft: 1974: 17th round, 431st overall pick

Career history
- 1971–1973: Auburn Tigers

Awards and highlights
- First-team All-SEC (1973)

David Allen Langner (November 8, 1951 – April 26, 2014) was an American football player. He played college football at Auburn University and was a key player in "Punt Bama Punt". Langner was drafted by the Kansas City Chiefs in the 17th round of the 1974 NFL draft, but did not have a career in the NFL.

Langner died of cancer at a hospice in Tuscaloosa, Alabama on April 26, 2014.
