= Cadillac Williams =

American football player and coach (born 1982)

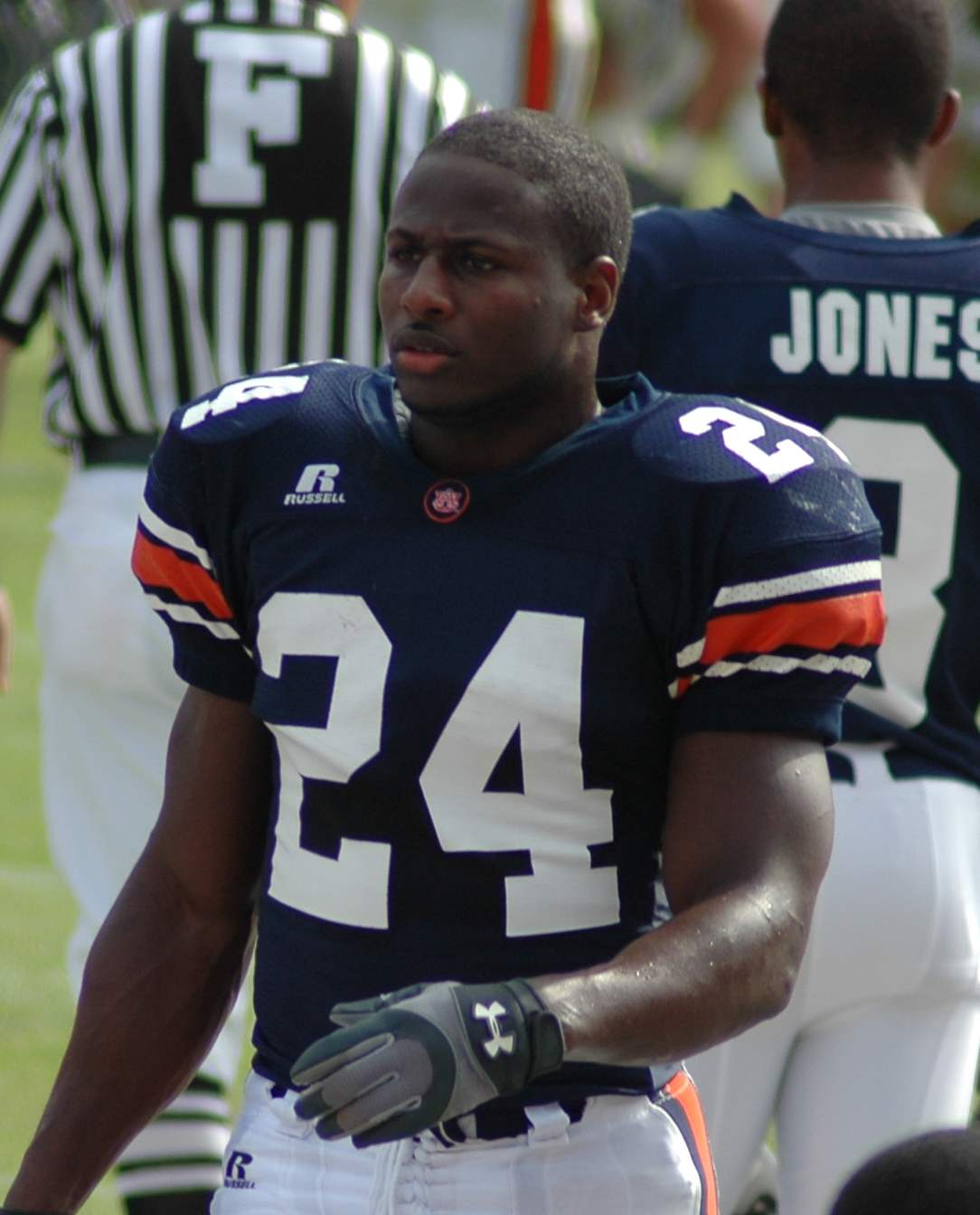
- Williams with the Auburn Tigers in 2004

No. 24, 33
- Position: Running back

Personal information
- Born: April 21, 1982 (age 44); Gadsden, Alabama, U.S.
- Listed height: 5 ft 11 in (1.80 m)
- Listed weight: 204 lb (93 kg)

Career information
- High school: Etowah (Attalla, Alabama)
- College: Auburn (2001–2004)
- NFL draft: 2005: 1st round, 5th overall pick

Career history

Playing
- Tampa Bay Buccaneers (2005–2010); St. Louis Rams (2011)

Coaching
- Henderson State (2015) Running backs coach; West Georgia (2016) Graduate assistant; IMG Academy (FL) (2017) Running backs coach; Birmingham Iron (2018) Running backs coach; Auburn (2019–2022) Running backs coach; Auburn (2022) Interim head coach; Auburn (2023) Associate head coach & running backs coach; Las Vegas Raiders (2024) Running backs coach

Awards and highlights
- NFL Offensive Rookie of the Year (2005); PFWA All-Rookie Team (2005); First-team All-American (2004); SEC Special Teams Player of the Year (2004); 2× First-team All-SEC (2003, 2004)

Career NFL statistics
- Rushing attempts: 1,055
- Rushing yards: 4,038
- Rushing touchdowns: 21
- Receptions: 148
- Receiving yards: 1,002
- Receiving touchdowns: 4
- Stats at Pro Football Reference

Head coaching record
- Regular season: 2–2 (.500) (NCAA)

Carnell Lamar "Cadillac" Williams (born April 21, 1982) is an American professional football coach and former running back who most recently served as the running backs coach for the Las Vegas Raiders of the National Football League (NFL). He previously served as the running backs coach at Auburn University from 2019 to 2023, he also served as their interim head coach in 2022, the first African American to hold the position in Auburn history.

Williams played college football for the Auburn Tigers, where he set the school's record for career rushing touchdowns and helped the team go undefeated in 2004, when he was named a first-team All-American. During the 2005 NFL draft, Williams was selected by the Tampa Bay Buccaneers in the first round and also played for the St. Louis Rams. In 2005, Williams won the NFL Offensive Rookie of the Year award.

== Early life ==
Carnell Lamar Williams was born on April 21, 1982, in Gadsden, Alabama. He attended Etowah High School in Attalla, Alabama.

== College career ==
Williams attended Auburn University after graduating from Etowah High. He got the nickname "Cadillac" from a TV sportscaster in Alabama for the style and the way he ran – he was a notch above everyone on the field, and the name stuck. He began the 2001 season as a true freshman and the #3 running back on the depth chart. In the eighth game of the season he had a break-out game against the University of Arkansas and showed his outstanding talent and versatility as a running back. After amassing 177 yards in a 42–17 loss to Arkansas, Williams was promoted to starting running back. In the next game, the annual Deep South's Oldest Rivalry contest against the University of Georgia, he led Auburn to a 24–17 victory as he amassed 167 yards on a then Auburn record 41 carries, caught four passes for 71 yards and scored two touchdowns, one of which was the game winner. (That record stood until Tre Mason had 46 carries and 304 yards against Missouri in the 2013 SEC Championship Game.) Williams was injured early in the bitter in-state rivalry game against the University of Alabama (also known as the Iron Bowl) with a broken collar bone and had to sit out the rest of the season. In his freshman season, Williams played in nine games and finished with 614 yards on 120 carries (5.1 avg.) and six touchdowns.

The 2002 season started out as a promising season for Williams. Unfortunately, it also ended prematurely for him when he broke his lower left fibula against Florida and missed the last six games of the season. He amassed 745 yards on 141 attempts (5.3 avg.) and 10 touchdowns in only seven games prior to the injury.

In 2003, Williams was told that he would share the load at the running back position with Ronnie Brown. Brown had completed a stellar season the previous year after picking up the starting role when Williams went down with a broken ankle. However, Brown pulled a hamstring early on in the year and sat out most of the rest of the season, leaving Williams as the sole starting running back. Williams went on to have a sensational season setting an Auburn single-season record with 17 touchdowns, and gaining a career-high 1,307 yards on 241 attempts (5.4 avg.). The 2003 season was an important season for Williams because it showed that he could stay healthy and excel on the field on his own. His highlight of the season was breaking an 80-yard touchdown run on the first play of scrimmage against Alabama.

In 2004, Williams decided to return for his senior year at Auburn. This turned out to be a wise decision as he, along with quarterback Jason Campbell, Brown and others, helped lead the Tigers to an SEC Championship and Sugar Bowl winning season, finishing with a perfect 13–0 record and a controversial #2 ranking behind the University of Southern California. Williams went on to earn All-American honors and was named to the All-SEC first-team as both a running back and return specialist. He led the team in rushing for the third time with 1,165 yards on 239 carries (4.9 avg.) and scored 12 touchdowns. He finished the season with 1,718 all-purpose yards, the third highest single-season output in Auburn school history. Williams also threw one touchdown pass against Georgia. Some argue that Williams' senior year performance was not as good statistically (4.9-yard rushing average for example, the lowest in his college career) as his others because of poor blocking, while others argue that it was because defenses focused on him specifically.

Williams finished his collegiate career with 3,831 yards on 741 attempts (5.2 yards per attempt) and 45 touchdowns, breaking the all-time Auburn career records of most rushing attempts by Joe Cribbs (657), and most touchdowns by Bo Jackson (43), while finishing second in total rushing yards in a career behind Bo Jackson. His career total of 5,033 all-purpose yards also ranks second in school history behind James Brooks.

Williams also has the distinction of earning nine SEC Player of the Week honors in his career, the most in conference history.

At Auburn, Williams majored in sociology. He returned to Auburn to finish the final coursework necessary for a sociology degree in December 2014.

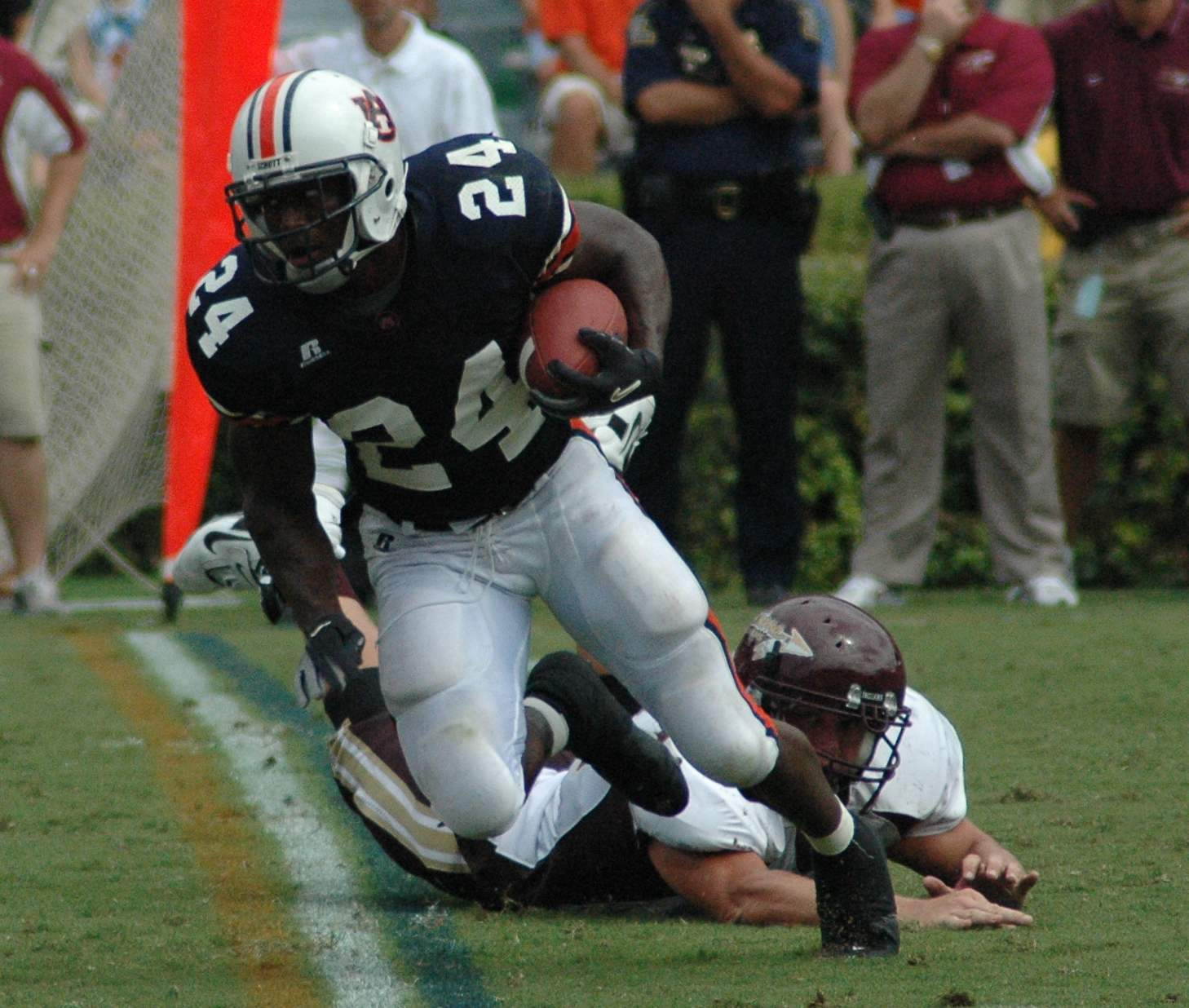
Williams evades a tackler at Auburn.

== Professional career ==
Pre-draft measurables
Height	Weight	Arm length	Hand span	40-yard dash	10-yard split	20-yard split	20-yard shuttle	Three-cone drill	Vertical jump	Broad jump	Bench press
5 ft 10 7/8 in (1.80 m)	217 lb (98 kg)	30 5/8 in (0.78 m)	8 1/4 in (0.21 m)	4.50 s	1.59 s	2.63 s	4.07 s	6.94 s	37.0 in (0.94 m)	10 ft 3 in (3.12 m)	19 reps
All values from NFL Combine/Pro Day

=== Tampa Bay Buccaneers ===
Williams entered the 2005 NFL draft and was selected with the fifth pick of the first round by the Tampa Bay Buccaneers. He signed a five-year contract worth $31 million.

Jeff Reynolds of Pro Football Weekly predicted Williams was the rookie most likely to have the greatest impact in the 2005 NFL season, writing that "at the Senior Bowl, Jon Gruden was salivating over this kid. He pulled him out real early. Don't think that was a coincidence. He's the offense. Gruden has set it up, Cadillac or bust".

The first half of the season for Williams was an up and down affair. Williams rushed for 434 yards in his first three weeks, setting records as the first rookie running back to ever have three consecutive 100 yard games, and rushing for the most yards in the first three weeks of a career, a record previously held by Alan Ameche of the 1955 Baltimore Colts. Williams was also named rookie of the week for the first three weeks of the season and rookie of the month for September. His shoes and gloves from week three were subsequently retired to the Football Hall of Fame in Canton, Ohio. In week four however, Williams dealt with injuries to his ankle and arch in his right foot, causing him to miss two weeks. In the next four games he played, including the game in which he was injured, Williams only rushed for a combined 82 yards on limited carries. However, in his next four games, he averaged over 100 yards per game (408). In his rookie season, Williams tallied six 100-yard games in 14 starts, and led all rookies in total rushing yards (1,178), rookie of the week honors (3), and finished second, behind Brandon Jacobs for rushing touchdowns (6).

On January 4, 2006, Williams was awarded the Associated Press NFL Offensive Rookie of the Year award. He drew 47 votes of a nationwide panel of 50 sports writers and broadcasters who cover the NFL. He beat former running mate Ronnie Brown of Miami, who received one vote. Tight end Heath Miller of Pittsburgh and offensive lineman Logan Mankins of New England also received one vote. On February 2, 2006, Williams was announced as the NFL Rookie of the Year Award winner based on the votes of over 1,000,000 visitors to NFL.com.

Williams was unable to match the success of his rookie campaign in the 2006 NFL season, as he failed to reach the 1,000 yard mark. His reduced production was attributed to poor offensive line play and an injury that nagged him all year.

==== Injuries ====
In October 2007, Williams suffered a torn patellar tendon to his right knee against Carolina, which required surgery and ended his season. Doctors were doubtful he would come back to full strength after this devastating injury. Williams, however, said that he had "no doubt" that he would play in 2008.

In mid-season of 2008, Williams began practicing with the team and was listed as questionable on the official injury report. In November, he was taken off the Physically Unable to Perform list and added to the active roster. He played in his first game in 14 months against Detroit. On November 30 against the Saints, he scored his first touchdown since his return. One month later, however, during the final game of the season on December 28, Williams suffered another torn patellar tendon, this time in his left knee.

The second tear was not as severe as the first, but Williams again endured surgery and an intense period of rehab to get back on the field. He returned to game action during the 2009 preseason and was the Bucs' starting running back to open the regular season, becoming the first NFL player to return from patellar tendon tears in both knees. On December 27, Williams had his first 100-yard rushing game in two seasons for the Tampa Bay Buccaneers and finished with 823 yards, the second highest total of his NFL career.. Williams was narrowly edged for the AP 2009 Comeback Player of the Year Award by Tom Brady, finishing second with 15 votes. He rushed for 821 yards on 210 carries with a 3.9 average and four touchdowns. He also caught 29 passes for 219 yards and 3 touchdowns.

After Williams' turnaround 2009 Tampa Bay Buccaneers season, in which he played in all 16 games for the first time in his career, the Tampa Bay Buccaneers had high hopes for their former National Football League Rookie of the Year Award winner. However, due to the emergence of undrafted rookie sensation LeGarrette Blount, Williams found himself cemented as primarily the third down running back for the latter half of the 2010 Tampa Bay Buccaneers season. Williams was used as a passing threat on third down and finished the season with 46 receptions for 355 yards and one touchdown (a come-from-behind, game-winning catch from Josh Freeman with ten seconds left in the fourth quarter on October 24, 2010, against the St. Louis Rams). He finished the 2010 NFL season with 125 rushing attempts for 437 yards and two touchdowns (one against the San Francisco 49ers and one against the Carolina Panthers), helping his team to a 10–6 record. The Buccaneers missed the 2010-11 NFL playoffs and Williams became an unrestricted free agent in 2011.

=== St. Louis Rams ===
On August 3, 2011, Williams signed with the St. Louis Rams to be the backup for Steven Jackson. In the 2011 regular season opener, Williams had 91 yards on 19 carries against the Philadelphia Eagles. Williams rushed effectively throughout the season for St. Louis, mainly in a backup capacity. He finished the year with 361 rushing yards and 4.1 yards per carry. He also scored one rushing touchdown, in the final game of the season against the San Francisco 49ers.

== Coaching career ==
=== West Georgia ===
Williams served as an offensive graduate assistant at the University of West Georgia in Carrollton, Georgia, for the 2016 season.

=== IMG Academy ===
Williams later served as the running backs coach for the newly created IMG White football team at IMG Academy in Bradenton, Florida.

=== Birmingham Iron ===
In 2018, Williams became the running backs coach for the Birmingham Iron of the Alliance of American Football.

=== Auburn ===
On January 23, 2019, Williams was hired as the running backs coach at the Auburn University under head coach Gus Malzahn. Williams acknowledges and expresses gratitude for Malzahn's early mentoring in his career. Auburn fired Malzahn after the 2020 season; new head coach Bryan Harsin retained Williams as running backs coach. On October 31, 2022, Auburn fired Harsin and named Williams the interim head coach. On November 12, 2022, Williams won his first game as a head coach, a 13–10 victory over Texas A&M. Williams, who finished the 2022 regular season at 2–2 as interim head coach, was retained as an assistant by Hugh Freeze when Freeze was named the permanent head coach on November 28. Williams resigned from Auburn following the 2023 season.

=== Las Vegas Raiders ===
On February 23, 2024, Williams was hired by the Las Vegas Raiders as their running backs coach under head coach Antonio Pierce. On February 4, 2025, Williams was dismissed by the Raiders.

== Career statistics ==
=== Playing career ===
==== NFL regular season ====
Year	Team	GP	Rushing						Receiving						Fumbles	
Year	Team	GP	Att	Yds	Avg	Lng	TD	Y/G	Rec	Yds	Avg	Lng	TD	Y/G	Fum	Lost
2005	TB	14	290	1,178	4.1	71	6	84.1	20	81	4.1	15	0	6.2	3	2
2006	TB	14	225	798	3.5	38	1	57.0	30	196	6.5	21	0	14.0	3	3
2007	TB	4	54	208	3.9	38	3	52.0	3	17	5.6	6	0	4.3	2	2
2008	TB	6	63	233	3.7	28	4	38.8	7	43	6.1	25	0	7.2	1	0
2009	TB	16	211	832	3.9	35	4	51.3	28	217	7.8	22	3	13.5	1	0
2010	TB	16	125	437	3.5	45	2	27.3	46	355	7.7	20	1	22.2	1	1
2011	STL	11	87	361	4.1	23	1	30.1	14	93	6.6	16	0	7.8	1	1
Total		81	1,055	4,047	3.8	71	21	50.0	148	1,002	6.8	25	4	12.4	12	9

==== NFL playoffs ====
Year	Team	GP	Rushing						Receiving						Fumbles	
Year	Team	GP	Att	Yds	Avg	Lng	TD	Y/G	Rec	Yds	Avg	Lng	TD	Y/G	Fum	Lost
2005	TB	1	18	49	2.7	7	0	49.0	3	10	3.3	6	0	3.3	1	1
2007	TB	Did not play due to injury														
Total		1	18	49	2.7	7	0	49.0	3	10	3.3	6	0	3.3	1	1

==== College ====
Season	Team	GP	Rushing					
Season	Team	GP	Att	Yds	Avg	Lng	TD	Y/G
2001	Auburn	9	120	614	5.1	55	6	68.2
2002	Auburn	7	141	745	5.3	65	10	106.4
2003	Auburn	13	241	1,307	5.4	80	17	100.5
2004	Auburn	13	239	1,165	4.9	36	12	89.6
Career		42	741	3,831	5.2	80	45	91.5

=== Head coaching record ===
Year	Team	Overall	Conference	Standing	Bowl/playoffs
Auburn Tigers (Southeastern Conference) (2022)
2022	Auburn	2–2 (Note: Williams replaced Bryan Harsin after eight games.)	1–2	T–6th (Western)	
Auburn:		2–2	1–2		
Total:		2–2			

== Personal life ==
Williams is a Christian. He is married and has two sons.
