= Stacy Searels =

American football player and coach (born 1965)

Current position
- Title: Senior offensive assistant
- Team: Georgia Bulldogs
- Conference: SEC

Biographical details
- Born: May 19, 1965 (age 61); Trion, Georgia, U.S.
- Education: Auburn

Coaching career (HC unless noted)
- 1992–1993: Auburn (GA)
- 1994–2000: Appalachian State (OL)
- 2001–2002: Cincinnati (OL)
- 2003–2006: LSU (OL)
- 2007–2010: Georgia (OL/RGC)
- 2011–2013: Texas (OL)
- 2014–2015: Virginia Tech (OL)
- 2016–2018: Miami (FL) (OL)
- 2019–2021: North Carolina (OL)
- 2022–2025: Georgia (OL)
- 2026–present: Georgia (sr. off. asst.)

Accomplishments and honors

Championships
- BCS national champion (2003); CFP national champion (2022)

Awards
- First-team All-American (1987); 2× First-team All-SEC (1986, 1987)

Stacy Searels (born May 19, 1965) is an American college football coach who is a senior offensive assistant for the Georgia Bulldogs of the Southeastern Conference (SEC).

== Playing years ==
A three-year starter on the offensive line at Auburn, Searels earned first-team All-America honors from both The Associated Press and Football News as a senior in 1987. He was a fourth round draft pick by the San Diego Chargers in the 1988 NFL draft.

== Coaching career ==
Searels coached the offensive line at Cincinnati for three seasons (2000–02) and at Appalachian State for seven seasons (1994-2000). He started his coaching career as a graduate assistant at Auburn, his alma mater, in 1992.

=== LSU ===
From 2003-06, Searels coached the offensive line at LSU, where he helped the Tigers win 44 games over four seasons and capture the 2003 BCS National Championship. Guard Stephen Peterman was drafted in the third round of the 2004 NFL draft by the Cowboys, while tackle Andrew Whitworth was a second-round pick of the Bengals in 2006.

=== Georgia ===
Searels coached the offensive line at Georgia for four seasons. He added the duties of running game coordinator in 2009. During his time in Athens, the Bulldogs ranked in the top 25 in the nation in fewest sacks allowed three times, including ranking sixth and leading the SEC in 2009 with just 12.

=== Texas ===
During his first season at Texas, Searels helped the Longhorns rank 21st nationally and third in the Big 12 with 210.4 rushing yards per game. In 2012, the offensive line, which was without a senior starter, allowed the opposition to post just 4.1 tackles for loss per game, which ranked tied for third in the country. In 2013, his final season at Texas, Searels’ line enabled the Longhorns to finish 36th in the country in rushing offense and 17th in sacks allowed per game. Trey Hopkins was named first-team All-Big 12, while Donald Hawkins secured a spot on the second team.

=== Virginia Tech ===
On January 22, 2014, Frank Beamer named Searels the Offensive Line coach at Virginia Tech.

=== Miami ===
On January 2, 2016, University of Miami football head coach Mark Richt named Searels as the Hurricanes’ offensive line coach for the start of the 2016 campaign. Miami’s offensive line played a key role in running back Mark Walton becoming just the 11th 1,000-yard rusher in Miami history in 2016.

=== North Carolina ===
On January 9, 2019, Searels was announced as the new offensive line coach at North Carolina. He left Chapel Hill to return to Georgia a day prior to the start of the Tar Heels' spring practice session in February 2022.

=== Return to Georgia ===
On February 28, 2022, it was reported that Searels would leave North Carolina to return to Georgia as offensive line coach, replacing Matt Luke, who resigned to spend more time with family.
