= Ronnie Brown =

American football player (born 1981)

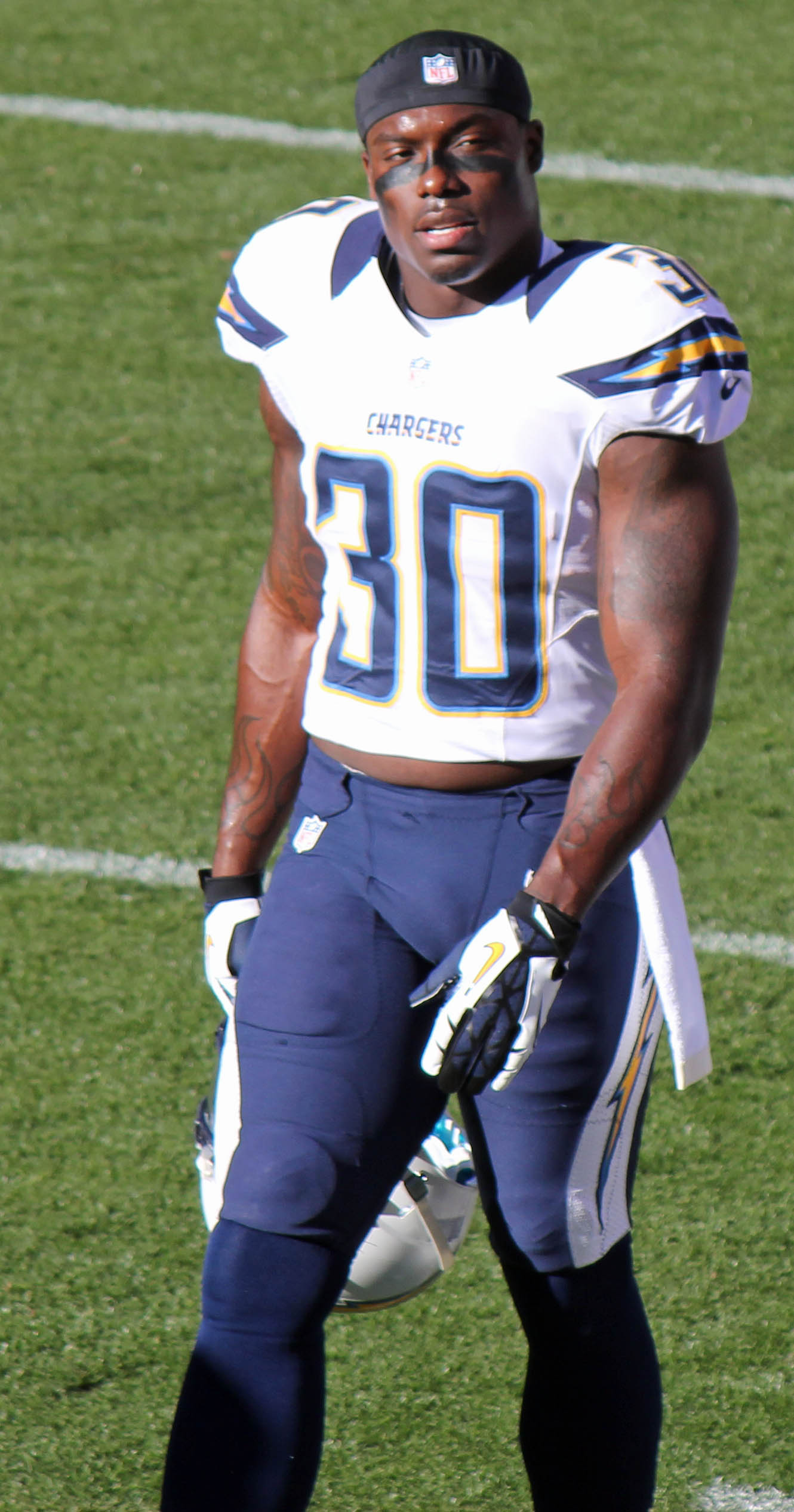
- Brown with the San Diego Chargers in 2012

No. 23, 34, 30, 22
- Position: Running back

Personal information
- Born: December 12, 1981 (age 44); Cartersville, Georgia, U.S.
- Listed height: 6 ft 0 in (1.83 m)
- Listed weight: 223 lb (101 kg)

Career information
- High school: Cartersville
- College: Auburn (2000–2004)
- NFL draft: 2005: 1st round, 2nd overall pick

Career history
- Miami Dolphins (2005–2010); Philadelphia Eagles (2011); San Diego Chargers (2012–2013); Houston Texans (2014); San Diego Chargers (2014)

Awards and highlights
- Pro Bowl (2008); PFWA All-Rookie Team (2005); First-team All-SEC (2004); Second-team All-SEC (2002); Citrus Bowl MVP (2003)

Career NFL statistics
- Rushing attempts: 1,281
- Rushing yards: 5,391
- Rushing touchdowns: 38
- Receptions: 246
- Receiving yards: 1,966
- Receiving touchdowns: 2
- Stats at Pro Football Reference

Ronnie G. Brown Jr. (born December 12, 1981) is an American former professional football player who was a running back in the National Football League (NFL). After graduating from Cartersville High School in Georgia, Brown attended Auburn University to play college football for the Auburn Tigers. He and Cadillac Williams shared carries at running back, while he had 1,008 yards and 13 touchdowns in 2002, 446 yards and five touchdowns in 2003, and 913 yards and eight touchdowns in 2004. Brown finished seventh in school history with 2,707 rushing yards and fifth with 28 rushing touchdowns. He twice earned second-team All-Southeastern Conference honors in 2002 and 2004.

Brown was selected second overall by the Miami Dolphins in the 2005 NFL draft. Brown started at running back for the Dolphins for the first four weeks of the season while Ricky Williams served a suspension, and shared carries with him when he returned in week five. Brown became the feature back in 2006 due to Williams's full year suspension. Brown sat out three games due to a broken hand suffered on Thanksgiving Day in a game against the Detroit Lions, returning in week 16. He played in the first seven games of the 2007 season before suffering a knee injury which knocked him out for the remainder of the season. Williams started over Brown in the first two games of the 2008 season, but shared carries with him after week two. Brown had 916 yards and ten touchdowns in 2008, which led to his first Pro Bowl selection following the season. He was placed on injured reserve for the second straight season after suffering a foot injury in week nine of the 2009 season. Brown rushed for 734 yards and five touchdowns in 2010, as he started in all 16 games. He played for the Philadelphia Eagles in 2011 following a six-year career with the Dolphins.

== Early life ==
Brown attended Cartersville High School in Georgia, where he was a three-year starter.

== College career ==
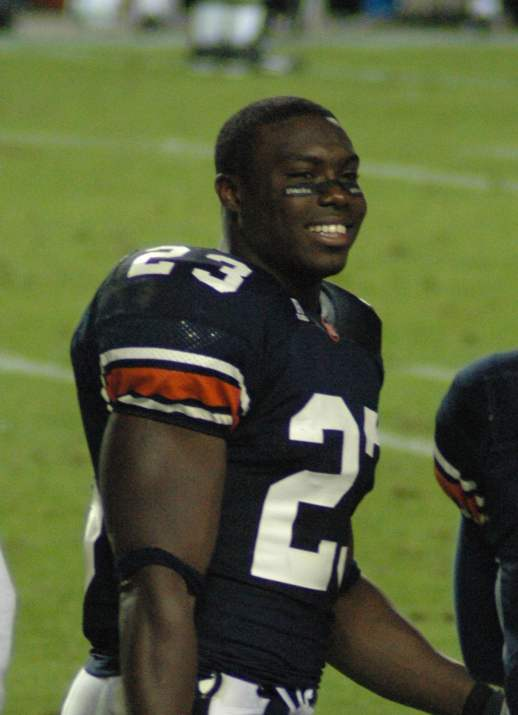
Brown on the sideline at the 2004 AU–UGA game.

Brown moved on to Auburn University, where he majored in communications and played for coach Tommy Tuberville's Auburn Tigers football team from 2000 to 2004. He teamed up with speed running back Carnell Williams to create a premier running threat of speed and power. He redshirted after playing in the first two games of the 2000 season as he only gained 10 yards on six carries. In 2001, he played in 10 games and ranked third on the team with 330 yards on 84 carries and two touchdowns while catching seven passes for 109 yards.

Brown enjoyed his best season in 2002 when he gained a career-high 1,008 yards on 175 carries (5.8 avg.) with 13 touchdowns while subbing for the injured Williams. He also had nine receptions for 166 yards (18.4 avg.) and a touchdown. However, in 2003, with Williams healthy and starting, Brown's statistics dropped as he carried the ball only 95 times for 446 yards (4.7 avg.), recorded five touchdowns, and had eight receptions for 80 yards.

In 2004, Brown shared duties with Williams and started seven games. Together with Jason Campbell, coach Tommy Tuberville called them the best backfield in the past 30 years as they led the team to a 13–0 record. He totaled 913 yards on 153 carries and scored eight times. He also displayed his receiving capabilities as he ranked second on the team with 34 catches for 313 yards and a touchdown.

Although he started only 21 of 47 games for Auburn he finished his career ranked seventh in school history with 2,707 yards rushing on 513 carries while ranking fifth with 28 rushing touchdowns. Brown also had 58 receptions for 668 yards and two touchdowns.

In 2020, Brown was inducted into the Alabama Sports Hall of Fame.

== Professional career ==
Pre-draft measurables
| Height | Weight | Arm length | Hand span | 40-yard dash | 10-yard split | 20-yard split | 20-yard shuttle | Three-cone drill | Vertical jump | Broad jump | Bench press |
|---|---|---|---|---|---|---|---|---|---|---|---|
| 6 ft 0 1/4 in (1.84 m) | 233 lb (106 kg) | 31 5/8 in (0.80 m) | 9 5/8 in (0.24 m) | 4.48 s | 1.56 s | 2.60 s | 4.08 s | 7.10 s | 34.0 in (0.86 m) | 9 ft 9 in (2.97 m) | 18 reps |
All values from NFL Combine

=== Miami Dolphins ===
Brown entered the 2005 NFL draft and was selected with the second overall pick of the first round by the Miami Dolphins. Fellow Auburn University halfback Carnell Williams was also in the draft and was selected with the fifth pick in the first round by the Tampa Bay Buccaneers. Brown held out of training camp due to a contract dispute and as a result was not successful running the ball in the first two weeks of the season as he rushed for only 93 yards on 34 carries (2.7 avg.) and 2 touchdowns. However, he got on track in Week 3 as he rushed for 132 yards on 23 carries (5.7 avg.) and his first career touchdown. He followed this up with a successful Week 4 performance rushing for 97 yards on 17 carries (5.7 avg.). But during Week 5, he had to again share rushing duties with another premier running back, this time Ricky Williams who was returning from a four-game suspension. Brown ended up having only about forty more rushes than Williams during the 2005 season, and was well on pace for a 1,000 yard campaign if it wasn't for them sharing the football. Brown ended up with 207 rushes for 907 yards (4.4 avg.) and 4 touchdowns while having 32 receptions for 232 yards and a touchdown.

With Ricky Williams suspended for the entire season, Brown entered 2006 as the feature back for the Miami Dolphins. The offensive line and offense in general struggled for the Dolphins, making it difficult for Brown to consistently produce at a high level. He had a breakout game on October 15 loss to the New York Jets, rushing for 127 yards and a touchdown on 22 carries. Three weeks later he rushed for a career-high 157 yards against a stingy Chicago Bears defense, helping the Dolphins to an upset victory of the previously undefeated Bears. On a Thanksgiving Day game against the Detroit Lions, Brown suffered a broken left hand from a hit by a defender's helmet. While he missed the next three contests, Brown returned for the final two games of the season and posted back-to-back 100-yard rushing performances against the Indianapolis Colts and New York Jets. In 13 games played, Brown finished with 1,008 rushing yards, 276 receiving yards, five touchdowns and a solid 4.2 average.

During the team's minicamp in May 2007, Brown revealed that he was eight pounds over his listed playing weight of 232, and would like to cut his body fat from 12 percent to 8 or 9 percent. During week 7, Ronnie Brown injured his knee making a tackle during an interception return and was lost for the season. At the time of his injury he was leading the league in yards from scrimmage and was on pace for over 2,200 total yards on the season.

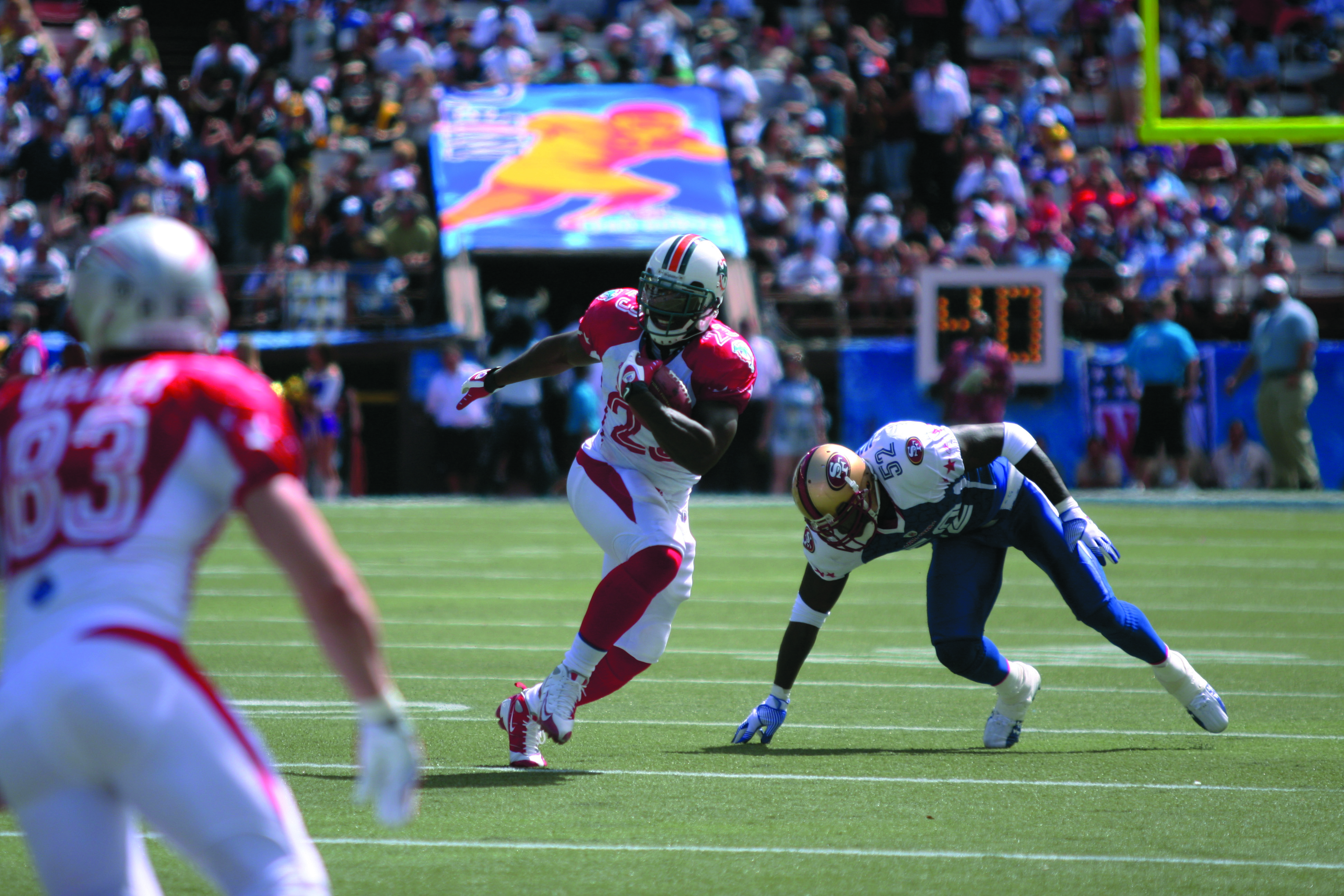
Brown maneuvers past 49ers linebacker Patrick Willis at the 2009 Pro Bowl.

Before the 2008 regular season started, Tony Sparano, announced Ricky Williams would be the starting running back. During the first two games Brown carried the ball 17 times for a total of 48 yards and one touchdown. Before the New England Patriots game Ronnie Brown was made the starting running back and has been featured in the Dolphins' popular Wildcat formation, college spread offense. Brown rushed for 117 yards, including four rushing scores, and also threw a touchdown pass. Although he split carries with teammate Ricky Williams, Brown still had a solid 2008 season rushing for 916 yards on 214 carries, an average of 4.3 ypc.

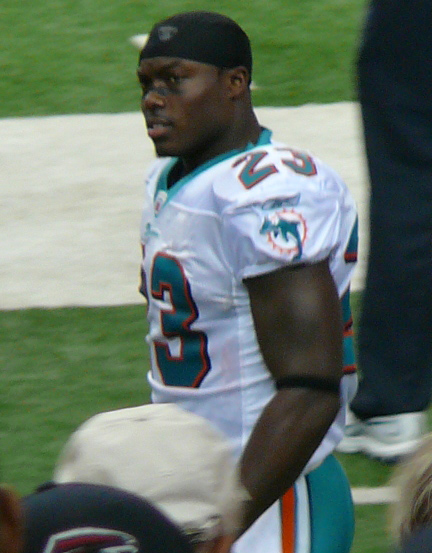
Brown with the Dolphins in 2009.

Brown was also selected to the 2009 Pro Bowl as a reserve running back.

For the 2009 NFL season, Brown played and started in nine of the sixteen games of the regular season. During these nine games Brown managed to carry the ball 148 times for a total of 648 yards averaging 4.4 yards per carry. Brown also managed to rush for eight touchdowns. Brown in addition to rushing the ball managed to complete 14 passes for a total of 98 yards. During the 11th week of the regular season; Brown suffered a right foot injury against Tampa Bay and was placed on injured reserve. Brown's injury caused him to miss the remainder of the season.

In 2010, Brown became a restricted free agent, but re-signed with the Dolphins.

On March 19, 2010, Brown was arrested for suspicion of driving under the influence of alcohol outside Atlanta.

=== Philadelphia Eagles ===
On August 2, 2011, Brown signed a one-year contract with the Philadelphia Eagles worth $1 million. It was reported that there were incentives in the contract that could take the value over $1 million.

The Eagles traded Brown to the Detroit Lions in exchange for running back Jerome Harrison and a seventh-round draft pick in 2013 on October 18, 2011, but the trade was voided the next day after Harrison failed his physical with the Eagles.

=== San Diego Chargers (first stint) ===
Brown signed a one-year contract with the San Diego Chargers on June 8, 2012. After an injury to starting running back Ryan Mathews in the preseason, Brown started the season opener against the Oakland Raiders on Monday Night Football. While he was ineffective on the ground, gaining just 5 yards on five carries, Brown became the third-down back for the Chargers. On January 5, 2014, Brown sealed a 27–10 win for the Chargers with a 58-yard touchdown run in the wild card playoff game against the Cincinnati Bengals.

=== Houston Texans ===
The Houston Texans signed Brown on August 11, 2014. He was released on October 1, 2014.

=== San Diego Chargers (second stint) ===
On October 7, 2014, Brown was signed by the Chargers, following a concussion suffered by Chargers' running back Donald Brown on October 5. The team had already lost running back Danny Woodhead for the season due to an ankle injury suffered on September 21, 2014, in a game against the Buffalo Bills. The team was also without running back Ryan Mathews who suffered an MCL sprain on September 21 in a game against the Seattle Seahawks and was expected to be out 4–5 weeks. Ronnie Brown played in seven games for the Chargers in the 2014 season. On December 20, 2014 (Week 16), in a game at San Francisco, he played an important role in a 38–35 overtime victory instrumental in keeping San Diego's playoff hopes alive. In overtime, Chargers quarterback Philip Rivers handed off the ball to Brown on six straight plays, as the team moved 22 yards to set up Nick Novak's game-winning field goal. The next week, in the regular-season finale, he didn't record a single carry, as the Chargers lost to the Kansas City Chiefs and didn't make the playoffs. At the end of the season, the San Diego Chargers organization didn't offer him a contract extension.

== Career statistics ==
=== NFL ===
| General | | | | Rushing | | | | | Receiving | | | | | | Fum |
| Season | Team | GP | GS | Att | Yards | Y/A | Y/G | TDs | Tgt | Rec | Yards | Y/R | Y/G | TDs | Fum |
|---|---|---|---|---|---|---|---|---|---|---|---|---|---|---|---|
| 2005 | MIA | 15 | 14 | 207 | 907 | 4.4 | 60.5 | 4 | 47 | 32 | 232 | 7.3 | 15.5 | 1 | 4 |
| 2006 | MIA | 13 | 12 | 241 | 1,008 | 4.2 | 77.5 | 5 | 38 | 33 | 276 | 8.4 | 21.2 | 0 | 4 |
| 2007 | MIA | 7 | 7 | 119 | 602 | 5.1 | 86.0 | 4 | 46 | 39 | 389 | 10.0 | 55.6 | 1 | 0 |
| 2008 | MIA | 16 | 13 | 214 | 916 | 4.3 | 57.3 | 10 | 43 | 33 | 254 | 7.7 | 15.9 | 0 | 1 |
| 2009 | MIA | 9 | 9 | 147 | 648 | 4.4 | 72.0 | 8 | 20 | 14 | 98 | 7.0 | 10.9 | 0 | 1 |
| 2010 | MIA | 16 | 16 | 200 | 734 | 3.7 | 45.9 | 5 | 43 | 33 | 242 | 7.3 | 15.1 | 0 | 3 |
| 2011 | PHI | 16 | 2 | 42 | 136 | 3.2 | 8.5 | 1 | 2 | 0 | 0 | — | 0.0 | 0 | 1 |
| 2012 | SD | 14 | 1 | 46 | 220 | 4.8 | 15.7 | 0 | 59 | 49 | 371 | 7.6 | 26.5 | 0 | 0 |
| 2013 | SD | 16 | 0 | 45 | 157 | 3.5 | 9.8 | 1 | 8 | 8 | 60 | 7.5 | 3.8 | 0 | 0 |
| 2014 | HOU | 3 | 0 | 6 | 4 | 0.7 | 1.3 | 0 | 1 | 1 | 5 | 5.0 | 1.7 | 0 | 0 |
| 2014 | SD | 7 | 0 | 14 | 59 | 4.2 | 8.4 | 0 | 7 | 4 | 39 | 9.8 | 5.6 | 0 | 0 |
| Career | | 132 | 74 | 1,281 | 5,391 | 4.2 | 40.8 | 38 | 314 | 246 | 1,966 | 8.0 | 14.9 | 2 | 14 |

=== College ===
| Season | Team | Games | Rushing | | | | Receiving | | | |
| Season | Team | GP | Att | Yds | Avg | TD | Rec | Yds | Avg | TD |
|---|---|---|---|---|---|---|---|---|---|---|
| 2000 | Auburn | 3 | 6 | 10 | 1.7 | 0 | 0 | 0 | 0 | 0 |
| 2001 | Auburn | 10 | 84 | 330 | 3.9 | 2 | 7 | 109 | 15.6 | 0 |
| 2002 | Auburn | 12 | 175 | 1,008 | 5.8 | 13 | 9 | 166 | 18.4 | 1 |
| 2003 | Auburn | 11 | 95 | 446 | 4.7 | 5 | 8 | 80 | 10.0 | 0 |
| 2004 | Auburn | 12 | 153 | 913 | 6.0 | 8 | 34 | 313 | 9.2 | 1 |
| Career | | 48 | 513 | 2,707 | 5.3 | 28 | 58 | 668 | 11.5 | 2 |
