= Terry Beasley =

American football player (1950–2024)

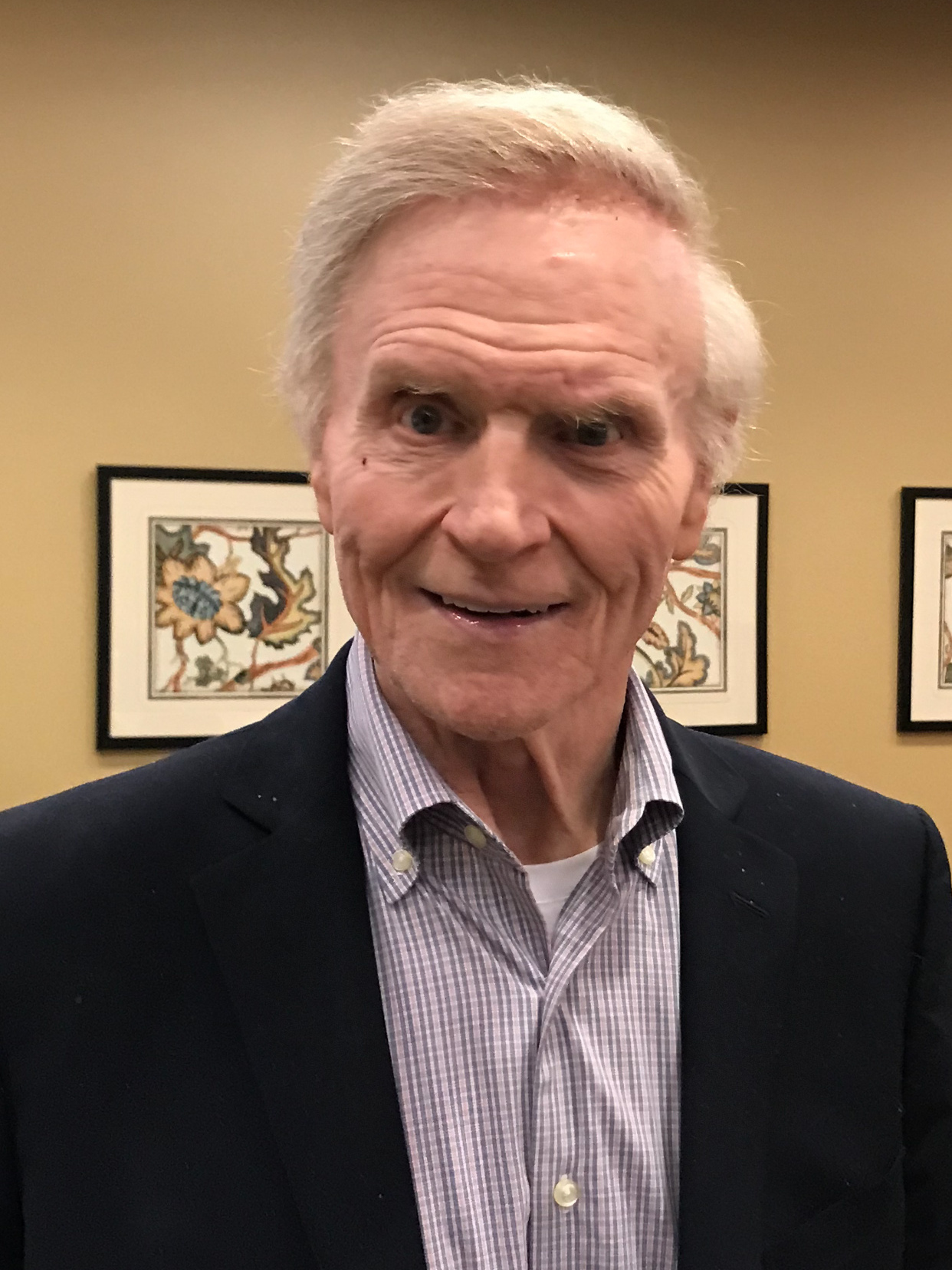
- Beasley in 2022

No. 83, 88
- Position: Wide receiver

Personal information
- Born: February 5, 1950; Montgomery, Alabama, U.S.
- Died: January 31, 2024 (aged 73); Moody, Alabama, U.S.
- Listed height: 5 ft 11 in (1.80 m)
- Listed weight: 186 lb (84 kg)

Career information
- High school: Robert E. Lee (Montgomery)
- College: Auburn (1969–1971)
- NFL draft: 1972: 1st round, 19th overall pick

Career history
- San Francisco 49ers (1972–1975)

Awards and highlights
- Unanimous All-American (1971); Second-team All-American (1970); 2× First-team All-SEC (1970, 1971); Second-team All-SEC (1969); Auburn Tigers No. 88 retired

Career NFL statistics
- Receptions: 38
- Receiving yards: 570
- Receiving touchdowns: 3
- Stats at Pro Football Reference
- College Football Hall of Fame

Terry Paul Beasley (February 5, 1950 – January 31, 2024) was an American professional football player who was a wide receiver for the San Francisco 49ers of the National Football League (NFL). He played college football for the Auburn Tigers, earning unanimous All-American honors in 1971. He was selected by the 49ers in the first round of the 1972 NFL draft with the 19th overall pick. He was inducted into the College Football Hall of Fame in 2002.

== Career ==
Beasley was born in Montgomery, Alabama, on February 5, 1950. After graduating from Robert E. Lee High School in Montgomery, he attended Auburn University, where he played college football for the Auburn Tigers as a wide receiver. He lettered from 1969 to 1971. In his college career, Beasley amassed 141 receptions, for program records of 2,507 yards and 29 touchdowns while playing with Heisman Trophy-winning quarterback Pat Sullivan. His 29 career receiving touchdowns were also an Southeastern Conference (SEC) record at the time. He was an All-American in 1970 and 1971. He led the SEC in receptions, receiving yards and scoring in 1970 with 52 receptions, 1,051 receiving yards and 72 points. In 1971, he was named the College Pass Receiver of the Year by the Touchdown Club of Columbus. Beasley is one of four Auburn players to have their number retired by the team, along with Sullivan, Bo Jackson and Cam Newton. He was elected into the College Football Hall of Fame in 2002.

The San Francisco 49ers selected Beasley in the first round of the 1972 NFL draft. He spent the duration of his short professional career there, for three seasons, before injuries forced his retirement following the 1975 season. In 29 career games, he had 38 receptions for 570 yards and three touchdowns. Beasley estimated that he suffered at least 52 concussions during his football career.

== Personal life ==
Beasley married Joanne Teel on April 5, 1970. They were married for 15 years and had four daughters. His second wife was Priscilla McClure. They had one son. He later married Marlene Brown. The two met in 1992, while Marlene was working as his psychiatric nurse who helped treat Beasley's injuries. They had no children together.

Beasley and his wife Marlene joined a class-action lawsuit against the NFL relating to head injuries suffered during the players' careers. He developed health problems from repeated concussions. Beasley stated as part of the lawsuit that he suffered from "memory loss, headaches, anxiety and sleeplessness" as a result of his football-related injuries. He spent most of May 2013 in the intensive care unit of Brookwood Medical Center in Birmingham, Alabama, due to problems with his health that his family believed were the result of his concussions. The lawsuit resulted in a settlement in December 2016.

Beasley died of a suspected suicide at his home in Moody, Alabama, on January 31, 2024, at the age of 73.

== Bibliography ==
- * God's Receiver: The Terry Beasley Story (1999) ISBN 978-0-9653313-2-6

== See also ==
- Concussions in American football
- List of NFL players with chronic traumatic encephalopathy
