= Kurt Crain =

American football player and coach (1964–2012)

Profile
- Position: Linebacker

Personal information
- Born: December 31, 1964; Birmingham, Alabama, U.S.
- Died: April 10, 2012 (aged 47); Mobile, Alabama, U.S.

Career information
- College: Memphis (1984–1985); Auburn (1986–1987)
- NFL draft: 1988: 6th round, 157th overall pick

Career history

Playing
- Houston Oilers (1988); Green Bay Packers (1989)*
- * Offseason or practice squad member only

Coaching
- Auburn (1990) Graduate assistant; Troy (1991) Linebackers coach; TCU (1992) Outside linebackers coach; Auburn (1993–1995) Defensive line coach; Auburn (1996) Linebackers coach; Team Alabama (2007) Defensive coordinator; South Alabama (2008–2009) Linebackers coach; South Alabama (2010–2011) Associate head coach & linebackers

Awards and highlights
- First-team All-American (1987); 2× First-team All-SEC (1986, 1987)

Kurt Bannon Crain (December 31, 1964 – April 10, 2012) was an American football player and coach. He played college football for the University of Memphis and Auburn University. He went on to play two seasons in the NFL – one for the Houston Oilers, the other for the Green Bay Packers. He was drafted by the Oilers in the sixth round of the 1988 NFL Draft. In 2008, he joined the coaching staff of the University of South Alabama.

Crain died of an apparent self-inflicted gunshot wound at his home in Spanish Fort, Alabama on April 10, 2012. He was 47.
