= Auburn Tigers football =

2026 Auburn Tigers football team
- First season: 1892; 134 years ago
- Athletic director: John Cohen
- General manager: Andrew Warsaw
- Head coach: Alex Golesh; 1st season, 6–4 (.600)
- Location: Auburn, Alabama
- Stadium: Jordan–Hare Stadium (capacity: 88,043)
- Field: Pat Dye Field
- NCAA division: Division I FBS
- Conference: SEC
- Colors: Burnt orange and navy blue
- All-time record: 825–490–47 (.623)
- Bowl record: 24–21–2 (.532)

National championships
- Claimed: 1910, 1913, 1914, 1957, 1958, 1983, 1993, 2004, 2010

National finalist
- BCS: 2010, 2013

Conference championships
- SIAA: 1900, 1904, 1908, 1910, 1913, 1914, 1919 SoCon: 1932 SEC: 1957, 1983, 1987, 1988, 1989, 2004, 2010, 2013

Division championships
- SEC West: 1993, 1997, 2000, 2001, 2002, 2004, 2005, 2010, 2013, 2017
- Heisman winners: Pat Sullivan – 1971; Bo Jackson – 1985; Cam Newton – 2010
- Consensus All-Americans: 31
- Rivalries: Alabama (rivalry); Georgia (rivalry); Florida (rivalry); LSU (rivalry); Tennessee (rivalry); Ole Miss (rivalry); Georgia Tech (rivalry); Clemson (rivalry); Tulane (rivalry)

Uniforms
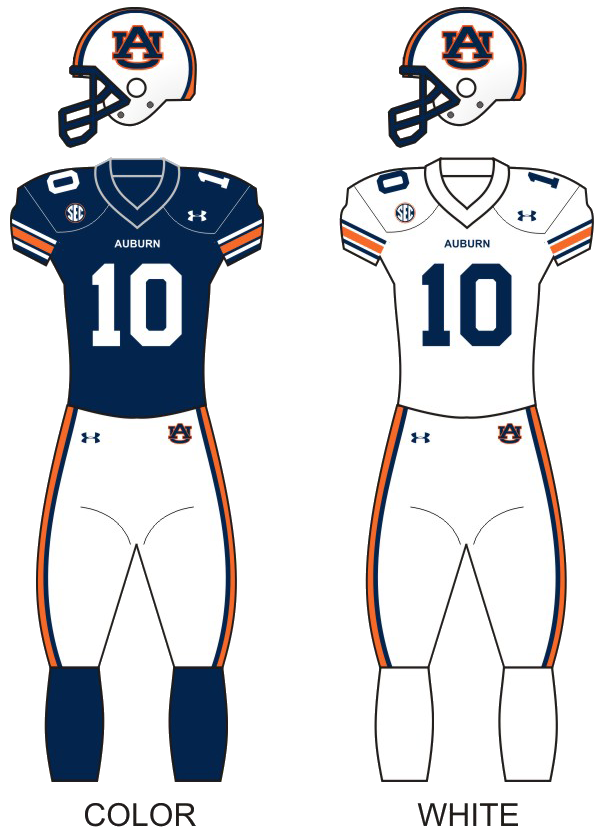
- Fight song: War Eagle
- Mascot: Aubie the Tiger
- Marching band: Auburn University Marching Band
- Outfitter: Nike, Inc.
- Website: auburntigers.com

The Auburn Tigers football program represents Auburn University in American college football. Auburn competes in the Football Bowl Subdivision (FBS) of the National Collegiate Athletic Association (NCAA) and the Southeastern Conference (SEC).

Auburn officially began competing in intercollegiate football in 1892. The Tigers joined the SEC in 1932 as one of the inaugural members of the conference. They began competing in the West Division when the conference divided in 1992, doing so until the SEC eliminated divisions in 2024. Auburn has achieved 12 undefeated seasons and won 16 conference championships, along with 10 divisional championships. The Tigers have made 44 post season bowl appearances, including 12 historically major bowl berths. With over 800 total wins, Auburn is the 13th winningest FBS program. The Tigers claim nine national championships; including two (1957, 2010) from the major wire-services: AP Poll and/or Coaches' Poll.

The Tigers have produced three Heisman Trophy winners: quarterback Pat Sullivan in 1971, running back Bo Jackson in 1985, and quarterback Cam Newton in 2010. Auburn has also produced 31 consensus All-American players. The College Football Hall of Fame has inducted a total of 12 individuals from Auburn, including eight student-athletes and four head coaches: John Heisman, Mike Donahue, Ralph Jordan, and Pat Dye. Jordan, who coached from 1951 to 1975, led Auburn to its first AP national championship and won a total of 176 games, the most by any Auburn coach.

Auburn's home stadium is Jordan–Hare Stadium, which opened in 1939 and becomes Alabama's fifth largest city on gamedays with a capacity of 88,043. Auburn's arch rival is in-state foe Alabama. The Tigers and Crimson Tide meet annually in the Iron Bowl, one of the biggest rivalries in all of sports.

== History ==
Auburn claims nine national championships: 1910, 1913, 1914, 1957, 1958, 1983, 1993, 2004 and 2010. Three Auburn players, Pat Sullivan in 1971, Bo Jackson in 1985, and Cam Newton in 2010 have won the Heisman Trophy. The Trophy's namesake, John Heisman, coached at Auburn from 1895 until 1899. Auburn is the only school that Heisman coached at (among others, Georgia Tech and Clemson) that has produced a Heisman Trophy winner. Auburn's Jordan–Hare Stadium has a capacity of 88,043 ranking as the tenth-largest on-campus stadium in the NCAA as of January 2011. Auburn played the first football game in the Deep South in 1892 against the University of Georgia at Piedmont Park in Atlanta, Georgia. The Tigers' first bowl appearance was in 1937 in the sixth Bacardi Bowl played in Havana, Cuba. AU Football has won 12 conference championships (8 SEC), has had seven perfect seasons, and during the division of the conference, six outright Western Division championships (1997, 2000, 2004, 2010, 2013, 2017) along with three additional co-championships. Auburn plays archrival Alabama each year in a game known as the Iron Bowl. In the overall series with Alabama, Auburn trails Alabama 42–35–1, despite holding an 18–14 advantage in games played since 1982. Of the 14 SEC member universities, Auburn currently ranks 5th in the number of SEC football championships.

Auburn completed the 2004 football season with an unblemished 13–0 record winning the SEC championship, their first conference title since 1989 and their first outright title since 1987. However, this achievement was somewhat overshadowed by the Tigers being left out of the BCS championship game in deference to two other undefeated, higher ranked teams, USC and Oklahoma. The 2004 team was led by quarterback Jason Campbell (Washington Commanders), running backs Carnell Williams (Tampa Bay Buccaneers) and Ronnie Brown (Miami Dolphins), and cornerback Carlos Rogers (Washington Commanders).

Auburn completed the 2010 football season with a perfect record of 13–0 winning the SEC championship when they defeated the University of South Carolina 56–17, which set an SEC Championship Game record for most points scored and largest margin of victory. The Tigers went on to defeat the Oregon Ducks 22–19 in their first appearance in the BCS National Championship Game on January 10, 2011, in Glendale, Arizona. The 2010 team was led by quarterback Cam Newton, who became the Heisman trophy winner of 2010 along with multiple other awards.

Auburn completed the 2013 regular season with an 11–1 record by knocking off then-#1 Alabama. Auburn went on to defeat #5 Missouri 59–42 in the 2013 SEC Championship Game to claim its eighth SEC championship. Auburn faced #1 Florida State in the 2014 BCS National Championship Game at the Rose Bowl, falling to the Seminoles in the final seconds, 31–34. The Tigers finished the season with a 12–2 record and ranked #2 in the final AP and Coaches polls.

=== Program success ===
In terms of winning percentage, Auburn ranks as the 22nd most successful team of all time through week 0 of the 2025 season with a 62.3% win rate.

The College Football Research Center lists Auburn as the 14th best college football program in history, with eight Auburn squads listed in Billingsley's Top 200 Teams of All Time (1869–2010). The Bleacher Report placed Auburn as the 18th best program of all time in their power rankings conducted after the 2010 season. In 2013, College Football Data Warehouse, a website dedicated to the historical data of college football, listed Auburn 13th all-time. After the 2008 season, ESPN ranked Auburn the 21st most prestigious program in history. Additional noteworthy outlets to rank Auburn in the top 25 all time were College Football News, who put the Tigers at 13th all time after the 2018 season, and the Associated Press, who ranked Auburn 15th all time after the 2017 season.

The Associated Press poll statistics show Auburn with the 11th best national record of being ranked in the final AP Poll and 14th overall (ranked 503 times out of 1,058 polls since the poll began in 1936), with an average ranking of 11.2. Since the Coaches Poll first released a final poll in 1950, Auburn has 26 seasons where the team finished ranked in the top 20 in both the AP and Coaches Polls.

Auburn has also had success against teams ranked number one in the nation. The Tigers have beaten seven teams ranked number one in either the AP, Coaches, Bowl Championship Series (BCS), or College Football Playoff (CFP) rankings. The BCS was created in 1998 to guarantee bowl game matchups between the top teams, including a national championship game between the two top-ranked teams. The BCS was discontinued in 2014 and replaced by the CFP, which organizes a four-team playoff and national championship game. The CFP was later altered to a 12-team, bracket-style format in 2024.

== Conference affiliations ==
Auburn has been a member of the Southeastern Conference since its founding in 1932.

Auburn has been both independent and affiliated with three conferences.

- Independent (1892–1894)
- Southern Intercollegiate Athletic Association (1895–1921)
- Southern Conference (1922–1932)
- Southeastern Conference (1932–present)

== Championships ==
=== National championships ===
The major wire-services, AP Poll and/or Coaches' Poll, have awarded Auburn with two national championships—1957 and 2010.

In 2025, Auburn claimed seven additional national titles, including selections made by several NCAA-designated major selectors for 1910, 1913, 1983 and 1993, as well for the undefeated seasons of 1914, 1958 and 2004.

Year	Coach	Selectors	Record	Final AP	Final Coaches
1957	Ralph Jordan	Associated Press, Billingsley, Football Research, Helms, National Championship Foundation, Poling, Sagarin, Sagarin (ELO-Chess), Williamson	10–0	No. 1	No. 2
2010	Gene Chizik	Anderson & Hester, AP, Bowl Championship Series, Berryman, Billingsley, College Football Researchers Association, Colley, Dunkel, Football Writers Association, FWAA-NFF Grantland Rice Super 16, Massey, National Football Foundation, Sagarin, USA Today, Wolfe	14–0	No. 1	No. 1

1910 season

1913 season

The 1913 team was coached by Mike Donahue and was undefeated at 8–0, outscoring opponents 224–13. Auburn, led by senior captain Kirk Newell, finished as SIAA champions for the first time in school history. Newell, also a member of the Upsilon chapter of Pi Kappa Alpha, went on to be a World War I hero and member of the Alabama Sports Hall of Fame. In 1999, the 1913 Tigers were selected by Richard Billingsley as national champion under his revised math system (in addition to his previous selection of the University of Chicago).

1957 season

The 1957 Auburn Tigers, led by coach Ralph "Shug" Jordan, finished with a perfect 10–0 record, marking the school's first ever SEC championship. Auburn was recognized as national champions by the AP Poll even though they were on probation and did not participate in a bowl game. This was the school's first recognized national championship. The 1957 title is shared with Ohio State, who was named the national champion by the Coaches' Poll. This was the first of only two times in the history of the AP championship that it was awarded to a team on probation not allowed to participate in a bowl game (it would occur again in 1974 with Oklahoma).

1983 season

The 1983 Auburn Tigers, led by head coach Pat Dye and running back Bo Jackson, finished 11–1 after playing the nation's toughest schedule. Their only loss came against No. 3 Texas, who defeated the Tigers, 20–7. Auburn went on to defeat No. 8 Michigan, 9–7, in the Sugar Bowl. Despite entering the bowl games ranked third in both major polls, and with both teams ranked higher losing their bowl games, the Tigers ended ranked third in the final AP poll. The New York Times ranked Auburn number one at the conclusion of the season, as did several other math system selectors. Later, the Billingsley Report math system retroactively listed Auburn at number one. The predominantly recognized national champions for 1983 are the Miami Hurricanes.

1993 season

Head coach Terry Bowden led the 1993 team to a perfect season in his first year on the Plains. The Tigers were the only undefeated team in major college football; however, they were banned from playing on television or post-season games due to NCAA violations. Rival Alabama was sent to the SEC Championship Game as the substitute representative of the Western Division. Auburn finished ranked fourth in the nation by the Associated Press. However, Auburn was on NCAA probation in 1993 and ineligible for post season play.

2010 season

The Tigers, led by head coach Gene Chizik and Gus Malzahn, completed a 12–0 regular season record and defeated South Carolina in the 2010 SEC Championship Game. On October 24, 2010, Auburn was ranked first in the BCS polls for the first time in school history. On January 10, 2011, Auburn defeated Oregon in the BCS National Championship Game in Glendale, Arizona, 22–19. It was the school's second claimed national title, but their first undisputed title. Their quarterback, Cam Newton, became the Tigers' third Heisman Trophy winner. He had a total of 2,854 yards passing and 30 passing touchdowns. He also rushed for 1,473 yards and 20 touchdowns. Auburn went on to have two first round picks in the 2011 NFL draft with Cam Newton going number one and Nick Fairley going 13th.

=== Conference championships ===
Auburn officially has won 16 total conference championships, including seven SIAA Championships, one Southern Conference Championship, and eight SEC Championships.

Year	Conference	Coach	Overall Record	Conference Record
1900†	SIAA	Walter H. Watkins	4-0	4-0
1904†	SIAA	Mike Donahue	5–0	4-0
1908†	SIAA	Mike Donahue	6-1	4-1
1910†	SIAA	Mike Donahue	6-1	6-0
1913	SIAA	Mike Donahue	9–0	8–0
1914†	SIAA	Mike Donahue	8–0–1	5–0–1
1919†	SIAA	Mike Donahue	8–1	5–1
1932†	SoCon	Chet A. Wynne	9–0–1	6–0–1
1957	SEC	Ralph Jordan	10–0	7–0
1983	SEC	Pat Dye	11–1	6–0
1987	SEC	Pat Dye	9–1–2	6–0–1
1988†	SEC	Pat Dye	10–2	6–1
1989†	SEC	Pat Dye	10–2	6–1
2004	SEC	Tommy Tuberville	13–0	8–0
2010	SEC	Gene Chizik	14–0	8–0
2013	SEC	Gus Malzahn	12–2	7–1

† Co-champions

=== Division championships ===
Since divisional play began in 1992, Auburn has won the SEC Western Division championship and gone on to the conference title game on six occasions and is 3–3 in the SEC Championship Game. The most recent appearance came in 2017 as Auburn completed the regular season 10–2, losing a rematch to Georgia in the 2017 SEC Championship Game. Auburn has also shared the division title but did not play in the championship game due to tiebreakers on three occasions. Auburn also finished the 1993 season in first place in the division but was not eligible for postseason play.

Year	Division	Coach	Overall Record	Conference Record	Opponent	SEC CG Result
1993†	SEC West	Terry Bowden	11-0	8-0	Ineligible for postseason	
1997†	SEC West	Terry Bowden	10–3	6–2	Tennessee	L 29–30
2000	SEC West	Tommy Tuberville	9–4	6–2	Florida	L 6–28
2001†	SEC West	Tommy Tuberville	7–5	5–3	LSU won divisional tiebreaker	
2002†	SEC West	Tommy Tuberville	9–4	5–3	Arkansas won divisional tiebreaker	
2004	SEC West	Tommy Tuberville	13–0	8–0	Tennessee	W 38–28
2005†	SEC West	Tommy Tuberville	9–3	7–1	LSU won divisional tiebreaker	
2010	SEC West	Gene Chizik	14–0	8–0	South Carolina	W 56–17
2013	SEC West	Gus Malzahn	12–2	7–1	Missouri	W 59–42
2017	SEC West	Gus Malzahn	10–4	7–1	Georgia	L 7–28

† Co-champions

== Head coaches ==
Auburn has had 30 head coaches, and four interim head coaches, since it began play during the 1892 season. On November 30 2025 Alex Golesh became the 33rd head coach of the Tigers. The team has played more than 1,200 games over 120 seasons. In that time, eight coaches have led the Tigers in postseason bowl games: Jack Meagher, Ralph Jordan, Pat Dye, Terry Bowden, Tommy Tuberville, Gene Chizik, Gus Malzahn, and Bryan Harsin. Billy Watkins, Mike Donahue, Chet A. Wynne, Jordan, Dye, Tuberville, Chizik, and Malzahn won a combined 12 conference championships. During their tenures, Jordan and Chizik each won national championships with the Tigers.

== Bowl games ==
Auburn has participated in 45 bowls in total, with the Tigers garnering a record of 24–19–2.

Season	Coach	Bowl	Opponent	Result	Attendance
1936	Jack Meagher	Bacardi Bowl	Villanova	T 7–7	12,000
1937	Jack Meagher	Orange Bowl	Michigan State	W 6–0	18,972
1953	Ralph Jordan	Gator Bowl	Texas Tech	L 13–35	28,641
1954	Ralph Jordan	Gator Bowl	No. 18 Baylor	W 33–13	28,426
1955	Ralph Jordan	Gator Bowl	Vanderbilt	L 13–25	32,174
1963	Ralph Jordan	Orange Bowl	No. 6 Nebraska	L 7–13	72,647
1965	Ralph Jordan	Liberty Bowl	Ole Miss	L 7–13	38,607
1968	Ralph Jordan	Sun Bowl	Arizona	W 34–10	32,307
1969	Ralph Jordan	Astro-Bluebonnet Bowl	No. 17 Houston	L 7–36	55,203
1970	Ralph Jordan	Gator Bowl	No. 10 Ole Miss	W 35–28	71,136
1971	Ralph Jordan	Sugar Bowl	No. 3 Oklahoma	L 22–40	80,096
1972	Ralph Jordan	Gator Bowl	No. 13 Colorado	W 24–3	71,114
1973	Ralph Jordan	Sun Bowl	Missouri	L 17–34	30,127
1974	Ralph Jordan	Gator Bowl	No. 11 Texas	W 27–3	63,811
1982	Pat Dye	Tangerine Bowl	Boston College	W 33–26	51,296
1983	Pat Dye	Sugar Bowl	No. 8 Michigan	W 9–7	77,893
1984	Pat Dye	Liberty Bowl	Arkansas	W 21–15	50,108
1985	Pat Dye	Cotton Bowl Classic	No. 11 Texas A&M	L 16–36	73,137
1986	Pat Dye	Florida Citrus Bowl	USC	W 16–7	51,113
1987	Pat Dye	Sugar Bowl	No. 4 Syracuse	T 16–16	75,495
1988	Pat Dye	Sugar Bowl	No. 4 Florida State	L 7–13	75,098
1989	Pat Dye	Hall of Fame Bowl	No. 21 Ohio State	W 31–14	52,535
1990	Pat Dye	Peach Bowl	Indiana	W 27–23	38,962
1995	Terry Bowden	Outback Bowl	No. 15 Penn State	L 14–43	65,313
1996	Terry Bowden	Independence Bowl	No. 24 Army	W 32–29	41,366
1997	Terry Bowden	Peach Bowl	Clemson	W 21–17	75,562
2000	Tommy Tuberville	Florida Citrus Bowl	No. 17 Michigan	L 28–31	66,928
2001	Tommy Tuberville	Peach Bowl	North Carolina	L 10–16	71,827
2002	Tommy Tuberville	Capital One Bowl	No. 10 Penn State	W 13–9	66,334
2003	Tommy Tuberville	Music City Bowl	Wisconsin	W 28–14	55,109
2004	Tommy Tuberville	Sugar Bowl	No. 9 Virginia Tech	W 16–13	77,349
2005	Tommy Tuberville	Capital One Bowl	No. 21 Wisconsin	L 10–24	57,221
2006	Tommy Tuberville	Cotton Bowl Classic	No. 22 Nebraska	W 17–14	66,777
2007	Tommy Tuberville	Chick-fil-A Bowl	No. 15 Clemson	W 23–20	74,413
2009	Gene Chizik	Outback Bowl	Northwestern	W 38–35	49,383
2010	Gene Chizik	BCS National Championship Game	No. 2 Oregon	W 22–19	78,603
2011	Gene Chizik	Chick-fil-A Bowl	Virginia	W 43–24	72,919
2013	Gus Malzahn	BCS National Championship Game	No. 1 Florida State	L 31–34	94,208
2014	Gus Malzahn	Outback Bowl	No. 17 Wisconsin	L 31–34	44,023
2015	Gus Malzahn	Birmingham Bowl	Memphis	W 31–10	59,430
2016	Gus Malzahn	Sugar Bowl	No. 7 Oklahoma	L 19–35	54,077
2017	Gus Malzahn	Peach Bowl	No. 12 UCF	L 27–34	72,360
2018	Gus Malzahn	Music City Bowl	Purdue	W 63–14	59,024
2019	Gus Malzahn	Outback Bowl	No. 18 Minnesota	L 24–31	45,652
2020	Kevin Steele	Citrus Bowl	No. 14 Northwestern	L 19–35	15,698
2021	Bryan Harsin	Birmingham Bowl	No. 20 Houston	L 13–17	47,100
2023	Hugh Freeze	Music City Bowl	Maryland	L 13–31	50,088

== Rivalries ==
Historically, Auburn has two main rivals, the cross-state Alabama Crimson Tide in the Iron Bowl, and the bordering Georgia Bulldogs in the Deep South's Oldest Rivalry.

=== Alabama ===
Alabama leads the series 52–37–1 through the 2025 season.

=== Clemson ===
Auburn leads 34–15–2 through the 2018 season.

=== Florida ===
Auburn leads 43–40–2 through the 2026 season.

=== Georgia ===
Georgia leads 66–57–8 through the 2026 season.

=== Georgia Tech ===
Auburn leads the series 47–41–4 through the 2017 season.

=== LSU ===
LSU leads 30–24–1 through the 2023 season.

=== Ole Miss ===
Auburn leads the series 35–12 through the 2023 season.

=== Tennessee ===
Auburn leads 29–23–3 through the 2020 season.

=== Tulane ===
Tulane leads the series 17–15–6 through the 2019 season.

== Traditions ==
=== Tiger Walk ===
Before each Auburn home football game, thousands of Auburn fans line Donahue Drive to cheer on the team as they walk from the Auburn Athletic Complex to Jordan–Hare Stadium. The tradition began in the 1950s when groups of kids would walk up the street to greet the team and get autographs. During the tenure of coach Doug Barfield, the coach urged fans to come out and support the team, and thousands did. Today the team walks down the hill and into the stadium surrounded by fans who pat them on the back and shake their hands as they walk. The largest Tiger Walk occurred on December 2, 1989, before the first ever home football game against rival Alabama—the Iron Bowl. On that day, an estimated 20,000 fans packed the one block section of road leading to the stadium. According to former athletic director David Housel, Tiger Walk has become "the most copied tradition in all of college football".

=== "War Eagle" ===
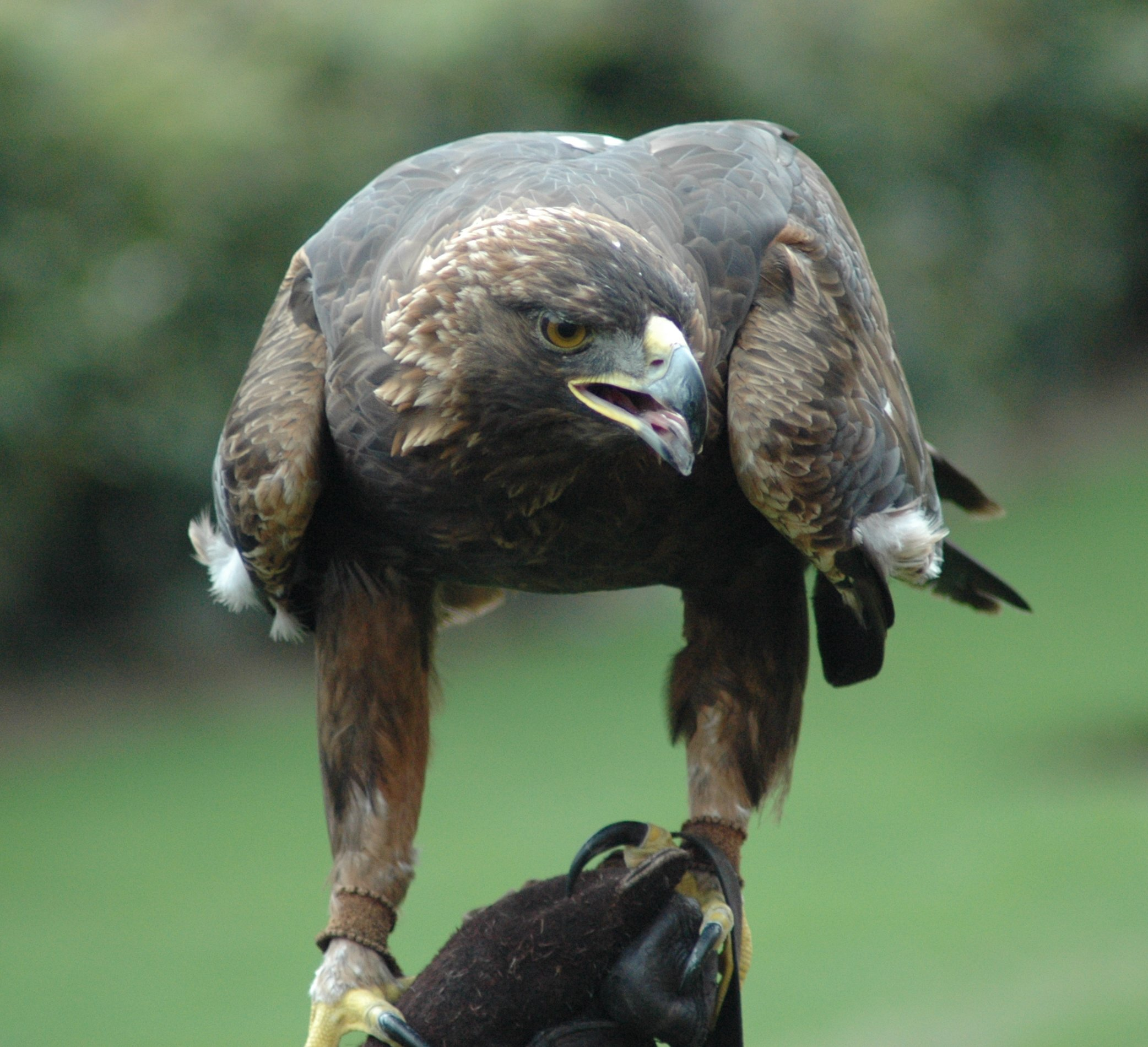
Nova, "War Eagle VII"

There are many stories surrounding the origins of Auburn's battle cry, "War Eagle". The most popular account involves the first Auburn football game in 1892 between Auburn and the University of Georgia. According to the story, in the stands that day was an old Civil War soldier with an eagle he had found injured on a battlefield and kept as a pet. The eagle broke free and began to soar over the field, and Auburn began to march toward the Georgia end-zone. The crowd began to chant, "War Eagle" as the eagle soared. After Auburn won the game, the eagle crashed to the field and died but, according to the legend, his spirit lives on every time an Auburn man or woman yells "War Eagle!" The battle cry of "War Eagle" also functions as a greeting for those associated with the university. For many years, a live golden eagle has embodied the spirit of this tradition. The eagle was once housed on campus in The A. Elwyn Hamer Jr. Aviary (which was the second largest single-bird enclosure in the country), but the aviary was taken down in 2003 and the eagle moved to a nearby raptor center. The eagle, War Eagle VI (nicknamed "Tiger"), was trained in 2000 to fly free around the stadium before every home game to the delight of fans. The present eagle, War Eagle VIII (nicknamed "Aurea"), continues the tradition. War Eagle VI is believed to be the inspiration behind the 2005–2006 Auburn Cheerleading squad's chant, "Tigers, Tigers, Gooooooo Tigers!"

=== Toomer's Corner ===
The intersection of Magnolia Avenue and College Street in Auburn, which marks the transition from downtown Auburn to the university campus, is known as Toomer's Corner. It is named after Toomer's Drugs, a small store on the corner that has been an Auburn landmark since 1896. Hanging over the corner were two massive old oak trees, planted in 1937, and whenever there was cause for celebration in the Auburn community, toilet paper could usually be found hanging from the trees. Also known as "rolling the corner", this tradition originated after Auburn upset No. 2 Alabama in the 1972 Iron Bowl, The famous 'Punt Bama Punt' Game. "We beat the 'number 2' out of Alabama." Until the mid-1990s, the tradition was relegated to only celebrating athletic wins.

The oak trees were cut down by the university in April 2013, as a result of their being poisoned by Harvey Updyke Jr., a fan of rival Alabama.

=== Wreck Tech Pajama Parade ===
The Wreck Tech Pajama Parade originated in 1896, when a group of mischievous Auburn students, determined to show up the more well-known engineers from Georgia Tech, snuck out of their dorms the night before the football game between Auburn and Tech and greased the railroad tracks. According to the story, the train carrying the Tech team slid through town and didn't stop until it was halfway to the neighboring town of Loachapoka, Alabama. The Tech team was forced to walk the five miles back to Auburn and, not surprisingly, were rather weary at the end of their journey. This likely contributed to their 45–0 loss. While the railroad long ago ceased to be the way teams traveled to Auburn and students never greased the tracks again, the tradition continues in the form of a parade through downtown Auburn. Students parade through the streets in their pajamas and organizations build floats.

== Award winners ==
A number of Auburn players and coaches have won national awards, including 66 players being named as college football All-Americans. The Tigers also have 11 coaches and players who have been inducted into the College Football Hall of Fame in Atlanta.

=== Statues ===
Auburn Tigers player statues
No.	Player	Pos.	Tenure
2	Cam Newton	QB	2010
7	Pat Sullivan	QB	1969–1971
34	Bo Jackson	RB	1982–1985
HC	John Heisman	HC	1895–1899

=== Retired numbers ===
The Tigers have retired four numbers to date, honoring the following players:

Auburn Tigers retired numbers
No.	Player	Pos.	Tenure	Ref.
2	Cam Newton	QB	2010	
7	Pat Sullivan	QB	1969–1971	
34	Bo Jackson	RB	1982–1985	
88	Terry Beasley	WR	1969–1971	

=== College Football Hall of Fame ===
Players Year Inducted	Coaches Year Inducted
1954 – Jimmy Hitchcock; 1956 – Walter Gilbert; 1991 – Pat Sullivan; 1994 – Tucker Frederickson; 1998 – Bo Jackson; 2002 – Terry Beasley; 2004 – Tracy Rocker; 2009 – Ed Dyas	1951 – "Iron Mike" Donahue; 1954 – John Heisman; 1982 – Ralph "Shug" Jordan; 2005 – Pat Dye

=== National awards ===
Players

Heisman Trophy Best player	Walter Camp Award Best player	Maxwell Award Best player	Davey O'Brien Award Best quarterback	Lott IMPACT Trophy Defensive IMPACT player
1971 – Pat Sullivan, QB; 1985 – Bo Jackson, RB; 2010 – Cam Newton, QB	1971 – Pat Sullivan, QB; 1985 – Bo Jackson, RB; 2010 – Cam Newton, QB	2010 – Cam Newton, QB	2010 – Cam Newton, QB	2019 – Derrick Brown, DT

Manning Award Best quarterback	Outland Trophy Best interior lineman	Lombardi Award Best lineman/linebacker	Jim Thorpe Award Best defensive back	Rimington Trophy Best center
2010 – Cam Newton, QB	1958 – Zeke Smith,G; 1988 – Tracy Rocker, DT	1988 – Tracy Rocker, DT; 2010 – Nick Fairley, DT	2004 – Carlos Rogers, CB	2014 – Reese Dismukes, C

Coaches

Paul "Bear" Bryant Award Coach of the Year	Eddie Robinson Award Coach of the Year	Sporting News Award Coach of the Year	Home Depot Award Coach of the Year	Bowden Award Coach of the Year	Broyles Award Best assistant coach
1993 – Terry Bowden; 2004 – Tommy Tuberville; 2010 – Gene Chizik; 2013 – Gus Malzahn	1993 – Terry Bowden; 2013 – Gus Malzahn	1993 – Terry Bowden; 2004 – Tommy Tuberville; 2013 – Gus Malzahn	2010 – Gene Chizik; 2013 – Gus Malzahn	2010 – Gene Chizik; 2013 – Gus Malzahn	2004 – Gene Chizik; 2010 – Gus Malzahn

=== 1st Team All-Americans ===
Name	Position	Years	Source
Jimmy Hitchcock	HB	1932†	WCFF, AP, NEA
Walter Gilbert	C	1937	AP
Monk Gafford	RB	1942	INS
Caleb "Tex" Warrington	C	1944	FWAA, WCFF, AP
Travis Tidwell	RB	1949	Williamson
Jim Pyburn	WR	1954	
Joe Childress	RB	1955	FWAA
Frank D'Agostino	T	1955	AFCA, AP
Fob James	RB	1955	INS
Jimmy Phillips	DE	1957‡	AFCA, FWAA, WCFF, AP, TSN, NEA, INS, UP, Time
Zeke Smith	OG	1958†, 1959	AFCA, FWAA, WCFF, AP, CP, TSN, NEA, Time
Jackie Burkett	C	1958	AFCA, Time
Ken Rice	OT	1959, 1960†	AFCA, FWAA, WCFF, AP, CP, TSN, NEA, UPI, Time
Ed Dyas	RB	1960	FWAA
Jimmy Sidle	RB	1963	FWAA, AP
Tucker Frederickson	RB	1964†	FWAA, WCFF, NEA, CP, FN, AP, Time
Jack Thornton	DT	1965	NEA
Bill Cody	LB	1965	
Freddie Hyatt	WR	1967	TFN
David Campbell	DT	1968	NEA
Buddy McClinton	DB	1969†	AFCA, FWAA, WCFF, CP, FN, UPI
Larry Willingham	DB	1970†	AFCA, FWAA, WCFF, AP, FN, TSN, PFW, CP, NEA, UPI, Time
Pat Sullivan	QB	1970, 1971‡	AFCA, FWAA, WCFF, AP, FN, TSN, UPI
Terry Beasley	WR	1970, 1971‡	AFCA, FWAA, WCFF, AP, FN, TSN, NEA, UPI, Time
Mike Fuller	S	1974	FN
Ken Bernich	LB	1974†	AFCA, WCFF, AP
Neil O'Donoghue	PK	1976	TSN
Keith Uecker	OG	1981	Mizlou
Bob Harris	SS	1982	
Donnie Humphrey	DT	1983	WTBS
Gregg Carr	LB	1984†	AFCA, WCFF, AP, UPI
Bo Jackson	RB	1983†, 1985‡	AFCA, FWAA, WCFF, AP, TSN, UPI
Lewis Colbert	P	1985	AFCA, TSN
Ben Tamburello	C	1986‡	AFCA, FWAA, WCFF
Brent Fullwood	RB	1986‡	AFCA, FWAA, WCFF, AP, SH, TFN, UPI
Aundray Bruce	LB	1987†	AFCA, WCFF, SH, TFN, UPI
Kurt Crain	LB	1987	AP
Stacy Searels	OT	1987	AP, TFN
Tracy Rocker	DT	1987†, 1988‡	AFCA, FWAA, WCFF, AP, TSN, UPI
Walter Reeves	TE	1988	TSN
Benji Roland	DT	1988	TSN
Ed King	OG	1989, 1990‡	AFCA, FWAA, WCFF, AP, SH, UPI, TFN
Craig Ogletree	LB	1989	TSN
David Rocker	DT	1990†	AFCA, WCFF, AP, UPI
Wayne Gandy	OT	1993†	AP, FWAA, SH, UPI
Terry Daniel	P	1993†	AFCA, FWAA, WCFF, AP, TSN, SH, TFN
Brian Robinson	SS	1994†	WCFF, AP, TFN
Frank Sanders	WR	1994	AP, FWAA, SH
Chris Shelling	SS	1994	FWAA, SH
Victor Riley	OT	1997	AFCA
Takeo Spikes	LB	1997	TSN
Damon Duval	PK	2001†	AFCA, WCFF, AP
Karlos Dansby	LB	2003	AFCA, ESPN
Marcus McNeill	OT	2004, 2005†	AP, CBS, FWAA, SI, Rivals, CFN, WCFF, TSN, ESPN
Carlos Rogers	CB	2004†	AP, FWAA, WCFF, SI, Rivals, CFN, ESPN, CBS
Junior Rosegreen	SS	2004	SI, CBS
Carnell Williams	RB	2004	AFCA
Ben Grubbs	OG	2006	Rivals, ESPN, PFW
Cam Newton	QB	2010†	AFCA, AP, Rivals, SI, WCFF, TSN, CBS
Lee Ziemba	OT	2010†	AFCA, FWAA, SI, WCFF
Nick Fairley	DT	2010†	AP, FWAA, Rivals, SI, WCFF, ESPN, CBS, TSN
Steven Clark	P	2011	AP, SI, Rivals, PFW
Tre Mason	RB	2013	TSN
Chris Davis	PR	2013	TSN, CBS
Reese Dismukes	C	2014†	WCFF, AP, AFCA, FWAA, CBS, ESPN, Scout
Carl Lawson	DE	2016	FWAA
Braden Smith	OG	2017	AP
Jeff Holland	LB	2017	SI
Daniel Carlson	PK	2017	WCFF
Carlton Davis	CB	2017	SI
Derrick Brown	DT	2019‡	AFCA, FWAA, WCFF, AP, TSN
Roger McCreary	CB	2021	ESPN, AP

† Consensus All-American
‡ Unanimous All-American

== Future opponents ==
=== Conference opponents ===
From 1992 to 2023, Auburn played in the West Division of the SEC and played each opponent in the division each year along with several teams from the East Division. The SEC expanded to 16 teams and eliminated divisions in 2024, causing a new scheduling format for the Tigers to play against the other members of the conference. Only the 2024 conference schedule was announced on June 14, 2023, while the conference still considers a new format for the future.

==== 2024 conference schedule ====
Opponent	Site	Result
at Alabama	Bryant–Denny Stadium; Tuscaloosa, AL (Iron Bowl)	
Arkansas	Jordan-Hare Stadium; Auburn, AL	
at Georgia	Sanford Stadium; Athens, GA (Deep South's Oldest Rivalry)	
at Kentucky	Kroger Field; Lexington, KY	
at Missouri	Faurot Field; Columbia, MO	
Oklahoma	Jordan–Hare Stadium; Auburn, AL	
Texas A&M	Jordan–Hare Stadium; Auburn, AL	
Vanderbilt	Jordan–Hare Stadium; Auburn, AL	

=== Non-conference opponents ===
Announced schedules as of July 30, 2026.

2026	2027	2028	2029	2030	2031	2032	2033	2034
vs Baylor (Mercedes-Benz Stadium, Atlanta)	Middle Tennessee	Georgia Southern	at Miami (FL)	Miami (FL)	Troy	North Alabama		Missouri State
Southern Miss	Austin Peay	Notre Dame	Jacksonville State					
Samford	at Notre Dame	North Alabama	West Georgia					
