= 2014 Auburn Tigers football team =

American college football season

2014 Auburn Tigers football

Outback Bowl, L 31–34 vs. Wisconsin
- Conference: Southeastern Conference
- Western Division

Ranking
- Coaches: No. 23
- AP: No. 22
- Record: 8–5 (4–4 SEC)
- Head coach: Gus Malzahn (2nd season)
- Offensive coordinator: Rhett Lashlee (2nd season)
- Co-offensive coordinator: Dameyune Craig (2nd season)
- Offensive scheme: Hurry-up no-huddle spread option
- Defensive coordinator: Ellis Johnson (2nd season); Charlie Harbison (interim; bowl game)
- Base defense: 4–2–5
- Captains: Reese Dismukes; Gabe Wright
- Home stadium: Jordan–Hare Stadium

2014 Southeastern Conference football standings
	Conf.			Overall
Team	W		L	W		L
Eastern Division
No. 14 Missouri x	7	–	1	11	–	3
No. 9 Georgia	6	–	2	10	–	3
Florida	4	–	4	7	–	5
Tennessee	3	–	5	7	–	6
South Carolina	3	–	5	7	–	6
Kentucky	2	–	6	5	–	7
Vanderbilt	0	–	8	3	–	9
Western Division
No. 4 Alabama x$^	7	–	1	12	–	2
No. 11 Mississippi State	6	–	2	10	–	3
No. 17 Ole Miss *	5	–	3	9	–	4
No. 22 Auburn	4	–	4	8	–	5
LSU *	4	–	4	8	–	5
Texas A&M	3	–	5	8	–	5
Arkansas	2	–	6	7	–	6
Championship: Alabama 42, Missouri 13
^ – College Football Playoff participant; $ – Conference champion; x – Division champion/co-champions; * LSU and Ole Miss vacated all wins (except for Ole Miss' win over Presbyterian) due to NCAA violations.; Rankings from AP Poll

The 2014 Auburn Tigers football team represented Auburn University in the 2014 NCAA Division I FBS football season. The team was coached by Gus Malzahn, who was in his second season as head coach at Auburn. The Tigers played their home games at Jordan–Hare Stadium in Auburn, Alabama and competed in the Western Division of the Southeastern Conference (SEC). They finished the season 8–5, 4–4 in SEC play to finish in a tie for fourth place in the Western Division. They were invited to the Outback Bowl where they lost to Wisconsin.

== Before the season ==
Shortly after the 2013 season, Heisman Trophy finalist junior running back Tre Mason—who broke Bo Jackson's school record for rushing yards in a single season—as well as redshirt sophomore left tackle Greg Robinson declared their intentions to forgo their remaining eligibility and enter the NFL draft.

=== Recruiting class ===
The Tigers notched their fifth consecutive recruiting class ranked within the top 10 nationally. Five signees enrolled prior to spring practice, while the rest enrolled in the summer.

College recruiting (2014)
Name	Hometown	School	Height	Weight	40^{‡}	Commit date
Kalvaraz Bessent; CB	St. Marys, Georgia	Camden County High School	6 ft 1 in (1.85 m)	188 lb (85 kg)	–	Dec 9, 2013
Kalvaraz Bessent; CB	Recruit ratings: Scout: Rivals: 247Sports: ESPN:					
Markell Boston; S	Sharpsburg, Georgia	East Coweta High School	6 ft 1 in (1.85 m)	200 lb (91 kg)	–	Oct 29, 2013
Markell Boston; S	Recruit ratings: Scout: Rivals: 247Sports: ESPN:					
Myron Burton; WR	Lawrenceville, Georgia	Peachtree Ridge High School	6 ft 1 in (1.85 m)	202 lb (92 kg)	–	Oct 12, 2013
Myron Burton; WR	Recruit ratings: Scout: Rivals: 247Sports: ESPN:					
Xavier Dampeer; C	Mendenhall, Mississippi	Copiah-Lincoln Community College	6 ft 3 in (1.91 m)	300 lb (140 kg)	–	Oct 6, 2013
Xavier Dampeer; C	Recruit ratings: Scout: Rivals: 247Sports: ESPN:					
DeShaun Davis; LB	Prichard, Alabama	Vigor High School	6 ft 0 in (1.83 m)	224 lb (102 kg)	–	Apr 17, 2013
DeShaun Davis; LB	Recruit ratings: Scout: Rivals: 247Sports: ESPN:					
Rashaad Kennion; DE	Jacksonville, Florida	First Coast High School	6 ft 6 in (1.98 m)	225 lb (102 kg)	–	Jul 17, 2013
Rashaad Kennion; DE	Recruit ratings: Scout: Rivals: 247Sports: ESPN:					
DaVonte Lambert; DE	Keysville, Georgia	Georgia Military College	6 ft 2 in (1.88 m)	275 lb (125 kg)	–	Dec 18, 2013
DaVonte Lambert; DE	Recruit ratings: Scout: Rivals: 247Sports: ESPN:					
Devaroe Lawrence; DT	Greenville, South Carolina	Georgia Military College	6 ft 3 in (1.91 m)	275 lb (125 kg)	–	Nov 23, 2013
Devaroe Lawrence; DT	Recruit ratings: Scout: Rivals: 247Sports: ESPN:					
Chris Laye; TE	Cumming, Georgia	Lambert High School	6 ft 6 in (1.98 m)	225 lb (102 kg)	–	Apr 17, 2013
Chris Laye; TE	Recruit ratings: Scout: Rivals: 247Sports: ESPN:					
Jakell Mitchell; TE	Opelika, Alabama	Opelika High School	6 ft 4 in (1.93 m)	210 lb (95 kg)	–	May 25, 2013
Jakell Mitchell; TE	Recruit ratings: Scout: Rivals: 247Sports: ESPN:					
Derrick Moncrief; S	Prattville, Alabama	Gulf Coast Community College	6 ft 3 in (1.91 m)	226 lb (103 kg)	–	May 10, 2013
Derrick Moncrief; S	Recruit ratings: Scout: Rivals: 247Sports: ESPN:					
Kamryn Pettway; RB	Prattville, Alabama	Prattville High School	6 ft 0 in (1.83 m)	230 lb (100 kg)	–	Mar 30, 2013
Kamryn Pettway; RB	Recruit ratings: Scout: Rivals: 247Sports: ESPN:					
Stephen Roberts; S	Opelika, Alabama	Opelika High School	6 ft 1 in (1.85 m)	179 lb (81 kg)	–	Nov 20, 2013
Stephen Roberts; S	Recruit ratings: Scout: Rivals: 247Sports: ESPN:					
Nicholas Ruffin; CB	Duluth, Georgia	St. Pius X Catholic High School	6 ft 0 in (1.83 m)	172 lb (78 kg)	–	May 25, 2013
Nicholas Ruffin; CB	Recruit ratings: Scout: Rivals: 247Sports: ESPN:					
Dontavius Russell; DT	Carrollton, Georgia	Carrollton High School	6 ft 3 in (1.91 m)	298 lb (135 kg)	–	Dec 12, 2013
Dontavius Russell; DT	Recruit ratings: Scout: Rivals: 247Sports: ESPN:					
Braden Smith; OL	Olathe, Kansas	Olathe South High School	6 ft 6 in (1.98 m)	275 lb (125 kg)	–	Feb 5, 2014
Braden Smith; OL	Recruit ratings: Scout: Rivals: 247Sports: ESPN:					
Racean Thomas; RB	Anniston, Alabama	Oxford High School	5 ft 11 in (1.80 m)	198 lb (90 kg)	–	Aug 2, 2013
Racean Thomas; RB	Recruit ratings: Scout: Rivals: 247Sports: ESPN:					
Justin Thornton; DE	Prichard, Alabama	Vigor High School	6 ft 6 in (1.98 m)	220 lb (100 kg)	–	May 12, 2013
Justin Thornton; DE	Recruit ratings: Scout: Rivals: 247Sports: ESPN:					
Stanton Truitt; WR	Monroe, Georgia	Monroe Area High School	5 ft 9 in (1.75 m)	177 lb (80 kg)	–	Dec 18, 2013
Stanton Truitt; WR	Recruit ratings: Scout: Rivals: 247Sports: ESPN:					
Joseph Turner; CB	Sacramento, California	College of San Mateo	6 ft 2 in (1.88 m)	190 lb (86 kg)	–	Feb 12, 2014
Joseph Turner; CB	Recruit ratings: Scout: Rivals: 247Sports: ESPN:					
Sean White; QB	Boca Raton, Florida	University School of Nova South	6 ft 2 in (1.88 m)	204 lb (93 kg)	–	Jul 17, 2013
Sean White; QB	Recruit ratings: Scout: Rivals: 247Sports: ESPN:					
Andrew Williams; DE	McDonough, Georgia	Eagle's Landing Christian Academy	6 ft 4 in (1.93 m)	245 lb (111 kg)	–	Feb 5, 2014
Andrew Williams; DE	Recruit ratings: Scout: Rivals: 247Sports: ESPN:					
D’haquille Williams; WR	Laplace, Louisiana	Gulf Coast Community College	6 ft 3 in (1.91 m)	200 lb (91 kg)	–	Jul 21, 2013
D’haquille Williams; WR	Recruit ratings: Scout: Rivals: 247Sports: ESPN:					
Tre Williams; LB	Mobile, Alabama	St. Paul's Episcopal School	6 ft 2 in (1.88 m)	220 lb (100 kg)	–	May 8, 2013
Tre Williams; LB	Recruit ratings: Scout: Rivals: 247Sports: ESPN:					
Overall recruit ranking: Scout: 8 Rivals: 9 247Sports: 6 ESPN: 8
Note: In many cases, Scout, Rivals, 247Sports, On3, and ESPN may conflict in their listings of height and weight.; In these cases, the average was taken. ESPN grades are on a 100-point scale.; Sources: "Auburn Signee List 2014". Rivals.; "Scout.com Football Recruiting: Aubun". Scout.; "2014 Player Signees – Auburn". ESPN.; "Scout.com Team Recruiting Rankings". Scout.; "2014 Team Ranking". Rivals.com.

=== Spring game ===
The Tigers spring game 'A-Day' was held on Saturday April 19. The Blue team defeated the White team 58-3 with quarterback Nick Marshall and linebacker Kenny Flowers earning offensive and defensive MVP honors respectively. 70,645 fans attended the game, the second most in school history after the previous year's A-Day, which had 83,401 in attendance.

Auburn A-Day Game

Quarter	1	2	3	4	Total
White	3	0	0	0	3
Blue	23	21	7	7	58

at Jordan–Hare Stadium • Auburn, Alabama

- Date: April 19, 2014
- Game time: 2:15 p.m. CDT
- Game weather: Temperature: 60 °F (16 °C) • Wind 14 mph (23 km/h) N • Weather: Cloudy
- Game attendance: 70,645
- Referee: Marc Curles
- TV announcers (ESPN): Joe Tessitore (play-by-play), Todd Blackledge (analyst), Tom Luginbill (sideline reporter)

== Fall practice and preseason ==
Auburn lost starting DE Carl Lawson and reserve defensive end Keymiya Harrell to ACL injuries as well as starting OG Alex Kozan to a back injury. DT Tyler Nero's career is likely over after he collapsed during spring practice. OL Shane Callahan transferred to the University of Colorado, while Auburn added two transfers in former Ole Miss starting OG Austin Golson and former Georgia starting SS Trey Matthews—both will have to sit out the 2014 season per NCAA transfer rules before regaining eligibility for the 2015 season.

Auburn had a league high 13 players make it on the all SEC list. The 1st team players included QB Nick Marshall, WR Sammie Coates, C Reese Dismukes, DT Gabe Wright. The 2nd team players included TE CJ Uzomah, OG Alex Kozan (out for season) and ST Robenson Therezie. 3rd team selections were RB Cory Grant, OG Chad Slade, DT Montravius Adams, DE Carl Lawson (out for season), LB Cassanova McKinzy and CB Jonathan Mincy.

- QB Nick Marshall is a finalist for the Maxwell (Best Player), Davey O'Brien (QB) and Walter Camp Award (QB)
- WR Sammie Coates is a finalist for the Maxwell(Best Player) and Blietnekoff Award (WR) and AFCA's Good Works Team (off field award)
- TE CJ Uzomah is a finalist for the Mackey Award (TE)
- C Reese Dismukes is a finalist for the Rimington Award (C) and Lombardi (top lineman or LB)
- LB Kris Frost is a finalist for Butkus Award (LB)
- ST Robenson Therezie is a finalist for the Bednarik Award (top defensive player)

Senior starting CB Jonathan Mincy was arrested for 2nd degree marijuana possession and senior starting QB Nick Marshall was cited for possession of a small amount of marijuana (under once ounce) during the off-season. It was both players' first drug-related offenses. Mincy is currently going through a pre-trial diversion after his arrest. Both players did not start for the first game against Arkansas (however they would both see the field later in the game) and served some other undisclosed punishment.

Senior starting ST Robenson Therezie faced an undisclosed eligibility issue during fall camp, however he would be cleared to play just prior to the season opener against Arkansas.

== Personnel ==
=== Roster and staff ===
2014 Auburn Tigers football team roster
Players
Coaches
Offense

Pos.	#	Name	Class
WR	1	D'haquille Williams	Jr
WR	3	Dominic Walker	Fr
WR	4	Quan Bray	Sr
WR	5	Ricardo Louis	Jr
QB	6	Jeremy Johnson	So
WR	8	Tony Stevens	So
RB	9	Roc Thomas	Fr
WR	10	Stanton Truitt (injured)	Fr
TE	11	Brandon Fulse	Sr
QB	12	Jonathan Wallace	Jr
QB	13	Sean White	Fr
QB	14	Nick Marshall	Sr
QB	16	Tucker Tuberville	So
QB	17	Ben Durand	Jr
WR	18	Sammie Coates	Jr
RB	20	Corey Grant	Sr
RB	25	Peyton Barber	Fr
RB	30	Damien Lewis	So
WR	31	Mark White	So
TE	31	Jakell Mitchell	Fr
TE	32	Wade Norberg	Jr
RB	36	Kamryn Pettway	Fr
TE	37	Hunter Wood	Fr
WR	39	B.J. Trimble	Jr
FB	40	Gage Batten (injured)	So
RB	41	Patrick Lymon (injured)	Sr
WR	42	Blake Chapman	Fr
TE	43	Spencer Smith	So
RB	44	Cameron Artis-Payne	Sr
RB	46	Lawyer Tillman	Jr
TE	47	Chris Laye	Fr
TE	48	Kyle Sitzler	Fr
FB	49	Patrick Young	Jr
C	50	Reese Dismukes	Sr
OT	51	Patrick Miller	Jr
C	52	Xavier Dampeer	Jr
G	53	Devonte Danzey	Jr
OT	56	Avery Young	So
G	62	Chad Slade	Sr
G	63	Alex Kozan (injured)	So
OL	66	Kevin Austin	Fr
G	70	Robert Leff	So
OT	71	Braden Smith	Fr
OT	72	Shon Coleman	So
OL	73	Austin Golson	So
OT	74	Will Adams	So
G	75	Deon Mix	Fr
G	76	Jordan Diamond (injured)	So
OL	79	Joshua Thompson	Fr
WR	80	Marcus Davis	So
TE	81	C. J. Uzomah	Sr
WR	82	Melvin Ray	Jr
TE	83	Michael Clifton	So
WR	84	Myron Burton	Fr
TE	85	Wirth Campbell	Jr
WR	87	Gray King	Fr
WR	89	Jaylon Denson	Jr

Defense

Pos.	#	Name	Class
DT	1	Montravius Adams	So
CB	3	Jonathan Jones	Jr
CB	6	Jonathan Mincy	Sr
LB	8	Cassanova McKinzy	Jr
S	9	Jermaine Whitehead	Sr
DE	10	LaDarius Owens	Sr
S	11	Markell Boston	Fr
DB	12	Mack VanGorder	Jr
S	14	Stephen Roberts	Fr
S	15	Josh Holsey	Jr
LB	16	JaViere Mitchell	So
LB	17	Kris Frost	Jr
ST	19	Nick Ruffin	Fr
ST	21	Mackenro Alexander	So
LB	22	Khari Harding	So
S	23	Jonathan Ford	So
S	24	Derrick Moncrief	Jr
CB	25	Trovon Reed	Sr
ST	26	Justin Garrett	Jr
ST	27	Robenson Therezie	Sr
CB	28	T.J. Davis	So
S	29	Brandon King	Sr
LB	30	Tre Williams	Fr
DB	32	Nosakhere Griggs	Jr
DB	33	Niko Anthony	Sr
LB	33	Kenny Flowers	Jr
CB	35	Joseph Turner	Jr
DB	36	Michael Sherwood	Fr
CB	37	Kamryn Melton	So
DB	38	Adam Dyas	Sr
S	39	Tray Matthews	So
LB	40	Daniel Pond	Jr
CB	41	Kalvaraz Bessent	Fr
DE	42	Gimel President	So
LB	43	Anthony Swain	Jr
DE	45	Keymiya Harrell (injured)	Jr
LB	47	Cameron Toney	Fr
DT	50	Ben Bradley	Sr
DT	54	Jeffery Whitaker (injured)	Sr
DE	55	Carl Lawson (injured)	So
LB	57	Grant Smith	Fr
LB	57	DeShaun Davis	Fr
LB	58	Josh Shockley	Fr
DE	59	Raashed Kennion	Fr
DL	60	Alec Brown	Fr
DL	67	Chase Robinson	So
DL	68	Kyle Bolstad	So
DE	79	Andrew Williams	Fr
DE	86	DaVonte Lambert (injured)	Jr
DT	90	Gabe Wright	Sr
DE	92	Justin Thornton	Fr
DE	93	JaBrian Niles	Jr
DT	94	Devaroe Lawrence	So
DT	95	Dontavius Russell	Fr
DL	96	Aaron Garrison	Fr
DE	97	Elijah Daniel	So
DT	98	Angelo Blackson	Sr
DL	99	Brian Walsh	Jr

Special teams

Pos.	#	Name	Class
P	27	Rice Logan	Fr
P	28	Jimmy Hutchinson	Fr
P	29	Tyler Stovall	Fr
K/P	38	Daniel Carlson	Fr
K	39	Alex Kviklys	Jr
DS	48	Forrest Hill	Sr
DS	58	Zach Wade	Fr
K	64	Duncan McKinney	Jr
DT	69	Ike Powell	So
P	84	Jack Bjork	Fr
P	85	Matthew Shiel	Fr
K/P	91	Jarrod Fuqua	Fr

Head coach

- Gus Malzahn – 2nd year

Coordinators/assistant coaches

- Rodney Garner (Associate head coach / Defensive Line) – 2nd year
- Rhett Lashlee (Offensive Coordinator / Quarterbacks) – 2nd year
- Dameyune Craig (Co-Offensive Coordinator / Wide Receivers) – 2nd year
- Ellis Johnson (Defensive Coordinator / Linebackers) – 2nd year
- Charlie Harbison (Co-Defensive Coordinator / Safeties) – 2nd year
- Scott Fountain (Special Teams / Tight Ends) – 2nd year
- Tim Horton (Running Backs) – 2nd year
- J.B. Grimes (Offensive Linemen) – 2nd year
- Melvin Smith (Cornerbacks) – 2nd year
- Bobby Bentley (Offensive Analyst) – 1st year
- Ryan Russell (Strength and Conditioning) – 2nd year
- Jonathan Brewer (Graduate Assistant) – 2nd year

Legend

- (C) Team captain
- (S) Suspended
- (I) Ineligible
- Injured
- Redshirt

Roster
Last update: August 26, 2014

=== Returning starters ===
==== Offense ====
Player	Class	Position
Chad Slade	Senior	Right Guard
Reese Dismukes	Senior	Center
Quan Bray	Senior	Wide receiver
C. J. Uzomah	Senior	Tight end
Nick Marshall	Senior	Quarterback
Sammie Coates	Junior	Wide receiver
Ricardo Louis	Junior	Wide receiver
Avery Young	Sophomore	Right Tackle
Alex Kozan	Sophomore	Left Guard

==== Defense ====
Player	Class	Position
Jonathan Mincy	Senior	Cornerback
LaDarius Owens	Senior	Defensive end
Jermaine Whitehead	Senior	Safety
Gabe Wright	Senior	Defensive tackle
Robenson Therezie	Senior	Star
Kris Frost	Junior	Linebacker
Cassanova McKinzy	Junior	Linebacker
Josh Holsey	Junior	Safety

=== Depth chart ===
As of November 4, 2014

Defense

FS
Joshua Holsey
Stephen Roberts
Jermaine Whitehead

WLB	MLB	SLB
Kris Frost OR Justin Garrett	Cassanova McKinzy	Robenson Therezie
Tre Williams	Anthony Swain	Nick Ruffin
JaViere Mitchell	Cameron Toney	⋅

SS
Johnathan "Rudy" Ford
Derrick Moncrief
⋅

CB
Jonathan Mincy
T.J. Davis
⋅

DE	DT	DT	DE
Gimel President	Ben Bradley	Montravius Adams	DaVonte Lambert
LaDarius Owens	Gabe Wright	Angelo Blackson	Elijah Daniel
⋅	Jeff Whitaker	⋅	⋅

CB
Jonathan Jones
Trovon Reed
⋅

Offense

WR
D'haquille "Duke" Williams
Melvin Ray
Jaylon Denson

WR
Ricardo Louis OR Quan Bray
Marcus Davis
⋅

LT	LG	C	RG	RT
Shon Coleman	Devonte Danzey	Reese Dismukes	Chad Slade	Avery Young
Braden Smith	Avery Young	Xavier Dampeer	Robert Leff	Patrick Miller
⋅	⋅	⋅	⋅	⋅

TE
C. J. Uzomah OR Brandon Fulse
⋅
⋅

WR
Sammie Coates
Tony Stevens
Dominic Walker

QB
Nick Marshall
Jeremy Johnson
Sean White OR Jonathan Wallace

RB
Cameron Artis-Payne OR Corey Grant
Racean "Roc" Thomas
Peyton Barber

Special teams
PK Daniel Carlson
PK Alex Kviklys
P Daniel Carlson
P Matthew Shiel
KR Corey Grant
PR Quan Bray
LS Forrest Hill
H Tyler Stovall

Injured/Suspended

- DE Carl Lawson (ACL: Season)
- OG Alex Kozan (Back: Season)
- OG Jordan Diamond (Shoulder: Season)
- WR Stanton Truitt (Shoulder: Season)
- DL Jared Kennett (Shoulder: Season)

== Schedule ==
Date	Time	Opponent	Rank	Site	TV	Result	Attendance
August 30	3:00 p.m.	Arkansas	No. 6	Jordan–Hare Stadium; Auburn, Alabama (SEC Nation)	SECN	W 45–21	87,451
September 6	6:00 p.m.	San Jose State*	No. 5	Jordan–Hare Stadium; Auburn, Alabama	ESPN2	W 59–13	87,451
September 18	6:30 p.m.	at No. 20 Kansas State*	No. 5	Bill Snyder Family Football Stadium; Manhattan, Kansas	ESPN	W 20–14	53,046
September 27	3:00 p.m.	Louisiana Tech*^{†}	No. 5	Jordan–Hare Stadium; Auburn, Alabama	SECN	W 45–17	87,451
October 4	6:00 p.m.	No. 15 LSU	No. 5	Jordan–Hare Stadium; Auburn, Alabama (Tiger Bowl)	ESPN	W 41–7	87,451
October 11	2:30 p.m.	at No. 3 Mississippi State	No. 2	Davis Wade Stadium; Starkville, Mississippi (College GameDay)	CBS	L 23–38	62,945
October 25	6:30 p.m.	South Carolina	No. 5	Jordan–Hare Stadium; Auburn, Alabama	SECN	W 42–35	87,451
November 1	6:00 p.m.	at No. 4 Ole Miss	No. 3	Vaught–Hemingway Stadium; Oxford, Mississippi (rivalry)	ESPN	W 35–31	62,090
November 8	2:30 p.m.	Texas A&M	No. 3	Jordan–Hare Stadium; Auburn, Alabama	CBS	L 38–41	87,451
November 15	6:15 p.m.	at No. 15 Georgia	No. 9	Sanford Stadium; Athens, Georgia (Deep South's Oldest Rivalry)	ESPN	L 7–34	92,746
November 22	6:00 p.m.	Samford*	No. 14	Jordan–Hare Stadium; Auburn, Alabama	ESPNU	W 31–7	87,451
November 29	6:45 p.m.	at No. 1 Alabama	No. 15	Bryant–Denny Stadium; Tuscaloosa, Alabama (Iron Bowl) (College GameDay)	ESPN	L 44–55	101,821
January 1, 2015	11:00 a.m.	vs. No. 18 Wisconsin*	No. 19	Raymond James Stadium; Tampa, Florida (Outback Bowl)	ESPN2	L 31–34 ^{OT}	44,023
*Non-conference game; ^{†}Homecoming; Rankings from AP Poll (and CFP Rankings, after October 28) - Released prior to game; All times are in Central time

Schedule source: "2014 Auburn Tigers Football Schedule". FBS Schedules.

== Game summaries ==
=== Arkansas ===
Arkansas Razorbacks at #6 Auburn Tigers – Game summary

Quarter	1	2	3	4	Total
Arkansas	7	14	0	0	21
#6 Auburn	14	7	14	10	45

at Jordan–Hare Stadium • Auburn, Alabama

- Date: August 30, 2014
- Game time: 3:01 p.m. CDT
- Game weather: Temperature: 86 °F (30 °C) • Wind 6 mph (9.7 km/h) SW • Weather: Cloudy
- Game attendance: 87,451
- Referee: Hubert Owens
- TV announcers (SEC Network): Brent Musburger (play-by-play), Jesse Palmer (analyst), Maria Taylor (sideline reporter)

Game information

First Quarter

- AUB – Melvin Ray 49 yd pass from Jeremy Johnson (Daniel Carlson kick), 9:37 (AUB 7-0)
- ARK – Hunter Henry 14 yd pass from Brandon Allen (John Henson kick), 6:44 (TIE 7-7)
- AUB – Cameron Artis-Payne 1 yd run (Daniel Carlson kick), 4:01 (AUB 14-7)

Second Quarter

- AUB – D'haquille Williams 18 yd pass from Jeremy Johnson (Daniel Carlson kick), 13:20 (AUB 21-7)
- ARK – AJ Derby 17 yd pass from Brandon Allen (John Henson kick), 11:06 (AUB 21-14)
- ARK – Jonathan Williams 6 yd run (John Henson kick), 4:28 (TIE 21-21)

Third Quarter

- AUB – Nick Marshall 19 yd run (Daniel Carlson kick), 10:42 (AUB 28-21)
- AUB – Jermaine Whitehead 33 yd interception return (Daniel Carlson kick), 2:39 (AUB 35-21)

Fourth Quarter

- AUB – Daniel Carlson 45 yd field goal, 9:55 (AUB 38-21)
- AUB – Corey Grant 3 yd run (Daniel Carlson kick), 3:15 (AUB 45-21)

Top Passers

- AUB – Jeremy Johnson 12-16, 243 yds, 2 TD
- ARK – Brandon Allen 18-31, 175 yds, 2 TD, 1 INT

Top Rushers

- AUB – Cameron Artis-Payne 26 carries, 177 yds, 1 TD
- ARK – Alex Collins 10 carries, 68 yds

Top Receiving

- AUB – D'haquille Williams 9 receptions, 154 yds, 1 TD
- ARK – Demetrius Wilson 4 receptions, 55 yds

Jeremy Johnson started in place of Nick Marshall, and played until halftime. The defense was steamrolled at the beginning of the game, allowing 21 points in the first half, and the offense in the first half scored 21 points. Nick Marshall, who was suspended for the entire first half for a drug related citation, led Auburn's offense to 24 second half points. Auburn's defense improved greatly in the second half allowing 0 points in that period, forcing several dropped passes to wide open receivers. Auburn won its season debut.

A nearby thunderstorm caused a delay of one hour and 28 minutes in the 4th quarter at 9 minutes, 55 seconds remaining. Auburn now leads the all-time series 13–10–1.

=== San Jose State ===
San Jose State Spartans at #5 Auburn Tigers – Game summary

Quarter	1	2	3	4	Total
San Jose State	7	3	3	0	13
#5 Auburn	14	24	7	14	59

at Jordan–Hare Stadium • Auburn, Alabama

- Date: September 6, 2014
- Game time: 6:06 p.m. CDT
- Game weather: Temperature: 83 °F (28 °C) • Wind NW 5 mph (8.0 km/h) • Weather: Partly cloudy
- Game attendance: 87,451
- Referee: Dan Romeo
- TV announcers (ESPN2): Dave Pasch (play-by-play), Brian Griese (analyst), Tom Luginbill (sideline reporter)

Game information

First Quarter

- AUB – Ricardo Louis 4 yd pass from Nick Marshall (Daniel Carlson kick), 8:15 (AUB 7-0)
- SJSU – Tyler Ervin 75 yd pass from Blake Jurich (Austin Lopez kick), 8:03 (TIE 7-7)
- AUB – Cameron Artis-Payne 2 yd run (Daniel Carlson kick), 5:31 (AUB 14-7)

Second Quarter

- AUB – Cameron Artis-Payne 5 yd run (Daniel Carlson kick), 12:04 (AUB 21-7)
- AUB – Quan Bray 55 yd punt return (Daniel Carlson kick), 10:02 (AUB 28-7)
- AUB – Cameron Artis-Payne 1 yd run (Daniel Carlson kick), 7:29 (AUB 35-7)
- SJSU – Austin Lopez 27 yd field goal, 2:38 (AUB 35-10)
- AUB – Daniel Carlson 27 yd field goal, 0:00 (AUB 38-10)

Third Quarter

- SJSU – Austin Lopez 24 yd field goal, 2:52 (AUB 38-13)
- AUB – Nick Marshall 27 yd run (Daniel Carlson kick), 1:18 (AUB 45-13)

Fourth Quarter

- AUB – Jeremy Johnson 1 yd run (Daniel Carlson kick), 11:56 (AUB 52-13)
- AUB – Roc Thomas 3 yd run (Daniel Carlson kick), 10:47 (AUB 59-13)

Top Passers

- SJSU – Blake Jurich 16-27, 218 yds, 1 TD, 2 INT
- AUB – Nick Marshall 10-19, 101 yds, 1 TD

Top Rushers

- AUB – Cameron Artis-Payne 16 carries, 112 yds, 3 TD
- SJSU – Limihai Hifo 15 carries, 36 yds

Top Receiving

- AUB – D'haquille Williams 4 receptions, 60 yds
- SJSU – Tyler Winston 5 receptions, 50 yds

The second game of the season was against the San Jose State Spartans. The Tigers and Spartans had previously never met on the gridiron before. The Tigers now lead the series 1–0–0.

Auburn struggled on defense early, giving up some big plays, most notably a 75-yard touchdown pass from Blake Jurich to Tyler Ervin. On Auburn's first possession Nick Marshall ran 39 yards but lost the ball in the end zone resulting in a touchback. Auburn only gave up one touchdown and two field goals against the Spartans. Quan Bray had Auburn's first punt return for a touchdown since Chris Davis against Tennessee in 2013. Jermaine Whitehead also became the first Auburn player to record interceptions in back-to-back games since 2007. Roc Thomas got his first carries as an Auburn Tiger late in the game, and his first carry was a touchdown. This was also Cameron Artis-Payne's first multi-touchdown game. Auburn is now 2-0 and 1-0 in SEC play. The 2004 undefeated team was honored during the pregame ceremony.

=== Kansas State ===
#5 Auburn Tigers at #20 Kansas State Wildcats – Game summary

Quarter	1	2	3	4	Total
#5 Auburn	3	7	0	10	20
#20 Kansas State	0	7	0	7	14

at Bill Snyder Family Stadium • Manhattan, Kansas

- Date: September 18, 2014
- Game time: 6:32 p.m. CDT
- Game weather: Temperature: 76 °F (24 °C) • Wind E 4 mph (6.4 km/h) • Weather: Light Haze
- Game attendance: 53,046
- Referee: Rick Loumiet
- TV announcers (ESPN): Dave Pasch (play-by-play), Jesse Palmer and David Pollack (analysts), Samantha Ponder (sideline reporter)

Game information

First Quarter

- AUB – Daniel Carlson 34 yd field goal, 11:14 (AUB 3-0)

Second Quarter

- KS – DeMarcus Robinson 3 yd run (Jack Cantele kick), 4:56 (KS 7-3)
- AUB – Ricardo Louis 40 yd pass from Nick Marshall (Daniel Carlson kick), 1:34 (AUB 10-7)

Fourth Quarter

- AUB – Duke Williams 9 yd pass from Nick Marshall (Daniel Carlson kick), 14:10 (AUB 17-7)
- AUB – Daniel Carlson 25 yd field goal, 6:28 (AUB 20-7)
- KS – Charles Jones 1 yd run (Matthew McCrane kick), 3:49 (AUB 20-14)

Top Passers

- KS – Jake Waters 24-40, 245 yds, 2 INT
- AUB – Nick Marshall 17-31, 231 yds, 2 TD, 1 INT

Top Rushers

- AUB – Cameron Artis-Payne 22 carries, 63 yds
- KS – DeMarcus Robinson 8 carries, 25 yds, 1 TD

Top Receiving

- KS – Curry Sexton 11 receptions, 121 yds
- AUB – Duke Williams 8 receptions, 100 yds

In a rare Thursday night game, Auburn traveled to Kansas State. Auburn struck first with a field goal after a fumble by Kansas State was recovered by Auburn. Kansas State scored a touchdown in the second quarter. Auburn, however, struck back with a touchdown pass from Nick Marshall to Ricardo Louis. Auburn then scored the next 10 points, all during the fourth quarter. Kansas State then scored a touchdown with less than 5 minutes to go. Then, Auburn's last drive ended up in a 3rd and 9, and Nick Marshall threw the ball to Duke Williams who made an impressive reception to seal the win for Auburn. After this game, the Tigers lead the all-time series 4-0-0.

=== Louisiana Tech ===
Louisiana Tech Bulldogs at #5 Auburn Tigers – Game summary

Quarter	1	2	3	4	Total
Louisiana Tech	0	3	7	7	17
#5 Auburn	7	17	0	21	45

at Jordan–Hare Stadium • Auburn, Alabama

- Date: September 27, 2014
- Game time: 3:01 p.m. CDT
- Game weather: Temperature: 76 °F (24 °C) • Wind 7 mph (11 km/h) E • Weather: Cloudy
- Game attendance: 87,451
- Referee: Penn Wagers
- TV announcers (SEC Network): Brent Musburger (play-by-play), Jesse Palmer (analyst), Maria Taylor (sideline reporter)

Game information

First Quarter

- AUB – Cameron Artis-Payne 5 yd run (Daniel Carlson kick), 8:28 (AUB 7-0)

Second Quarter

- AUB – Daniel Carlson 25 yd field goal, 11:49 (AUB 10-0)
- AUB – Duke Williams 18 yd pass from Nick Marshall (Daniel Carlson kick), 1:36 (AUB 17-0)
- AUB – Quan Bray 37 yd pass from Nick Marshall (Daniel Carlson kick), 0:34 (AUB 24-0)
- LT – Jonathan Barnes 25 yd field goal, 0:00 (AUB 24-3)

Third Quarter

- LT – Kenneth Dixon 1 yd run (Jonathan Barnes kick), 6:54 (AUB 24-10)

Fourth Quarter

- AUB – Quan Bray 44 yd pass from Nick Marshall (Daniel Carlson kick), 14:24 (AUB 31-10)
- AUB – Quan Bray 76 yd punt return (Daniel Carlson kick), 13:21 (AUB 38-10)
- LT – Kenneth Dixon 9 yd run (Jonathan Barnes kick), 10:27 (AUB 38-17)
- AUB – C. J. Uzomah 15 yd pass from Jeremy Johnson, 7:53 (AUB 45-17)

Top Passers

- LT – Cody Sokol 20-35, 216 yds, 1 INT
- AUB – Nick Marshall 10-17, 166 yds, 3 TD

Top Rushers

- AUB – Cameron Artis-Payne 22 carries, 116 yds, 1 TD
- LT – Jarred Craft 9 carries, 41 yds

Top Receiving

- LT – Trent Taylor 8 receptions, 80 yds
- AUB – Quan Bray 3 receptions, 91 yds, 2 TD

The fourth game of the season was against the Louisiana Tech Bulldogs. Auburn was up 24–0 late in the second quarter before Louisiana Tech scored a field goal to end the half. There was a time when it was somewhat close early in the third quarter as Auburn only led 24–10. Auburn's offense then started scoring more points, especially Quan Bray who had two touchdowns in the second half and three touchdowns overall including two touchdown receptions and one punt return for a touchdown. Auburn ended up with a great homecoming victory 45-17. Auburn now leads the all-time series 12-0-1.

=== LSU ===
#15 LSU Tigers at #5 Auburn Tigers – Game summary

Quarter	1	2	3	4	Total
#15 LSU	7	0	0	0	7
#5 Auburn	17	14	3	7	41

at Jordan–Hare Stadium • Auburn, Alabama

- Date: October 4, 2014
- Game time: 6:01 p.m. CDT
- Game weather: Temperature: 59 °F (15 °C) • Wind NW 9 mph (14 km/h) • Weather: Sunny
- Game attendance: 87,451
- Referee: Matt Moore
- TV announcers (ESPN): Brad Nessler (play-by-play), Todd Blackledge (analyst), Holly Rowe (sideline reporter)

Game information

First Quarter

- AUB – Daniel Carlson 46 yd field goal, 10:16 (AUB 3–0)
- AUB – Sammie Coates 56 yd pass from Nick Marshall (Daniel Carlson kick), 7:05 (AUB 10–0)
- AUB – Nick Marshall 7 yd run (Daniel Carlson kick), 3:38 (AUB 17–0)
- LSU – Kenny Hilliard 1 yd run (Colby Delahoussaye kick), 1:24 (AUB 17–7)

Second Quarter

- AUB – C. J. Uzomah 9 yd pass from Nick Marshall (Daniel Carlson kick), 14:27 (AUB 24–7)
- AUB – Nick Marshall 29 yd run (Daniel Carlson kick), 2:12 (AUB 31–7)

Third Quarter

- AUB – Daniel Carlson 42 yd field goal, 7:33 (AUB 34–7)

Fourth Quarter

- AUB – Corey Grant 12 yd run (Daniel Carlson kick), 8:44 (AUB 41–7)

Top Passers

- AUB – Nick Marshall 14-22, 207 yds, 2 TD
- LSU – Anthony Jennings 5-10, 84 yds

Top Rushers

- AUB – Cameron Artis-Payne 24 carries, 126 yds,
- LSU – Leonard Fournette 10 carries, 42 yds

Top Receiving

- AUB – Sammie Coates 4 receptions, 144 yds, 1 TD
- LSU – John Diarse 2 receptions, 40 yds

Auburn struck first with a 46-yard field goal by Daniel Carlson which was his longest so far this season. The offense then lit up scoring 17 points in the first quarter. The defense only allowed one LSU touchdown, taking advantage of Les Miles's decision to have true freshman QB Brandon Harris have his 1st career start on the road at night in JHS. In the second quarter, Auburn scored 14 more points and the defense held LSU scoreless in that period. At halftime, the score was Auburn 31, LSU 7. Daniel Carlson got a 42-yard field goal in the third quarter. LSU did not convert a single third down, they were 0–13. Auburn stopped LSU on fourth down three times. It was a big conference win for Auburn. The win improved Auburn's all-time record against LSU to 21–27–1.

=== Mississippi State ===
#2 Auburn Tigers at #3 Mississippi State Bulldogs – Game summary

Quarter	1	2	3	4	Total
#2 Auburn	0	13	7	3	23
#3 Mississippi State	21	7	0	10	38

at Davis Wade Stadium • Starkville, Mississippi

- Date: October 11, 2014
- Game time: 2:45 p.m. CDT
- Game weather: Temperature: 83 °F (28 °C) • Wind SW 5 mph (8.0 km/h) • Weather: Partly Cloudy
- Game attendance: 62,945
- Referee: Tom Ritter
- TV announcers (CBS): Verne Lundquist (play-by-play), Gary Danielson (analyst), Allie LaForce (sideline reporter)

Game information

First Quarter

- MSU – De'Runnya Wilson 34 yd pass from Dak Prescott (Evan Sobiesk kick), 12:41 (MSU 7-0)
- MSU – Josh Robinson 1 yd run (Evan Sobiesk kick), 11:30 (MSU 14-0)
- MSU – Dak Prescott 2 yd run (Evan Sobiesk kick), 6:09 (MSU 21-0)

Second Quarter

- AUB – Daniel Carlson 21 yd field goal, 14:57 (MSU 21-3)
- AUB – Daniel Carlson 22 yd field goal, 11:17 (MSU 21-6)
- AUB – D'haquille Williams 9 yd pass from Nick Marshall (Daniel Carlson kick), 5:26 (MSU 21-13)
- MSU – Dak Prescott 15 yd run (Evan Sobiesk kick), 3:58 (MSU 28-13)

Third Quarter

- AUB – D'haquille Williams 15 yd pass from Nick Marshall (Daniel Carlson kick), 6:09 (MSU 28-20)

Fourth Quarter

- MSU – Evan Sobiesk 21 yd field goal, 11:33 (MSU 31-20)
- MSU – Josh Robinson 1 yd run (Evan Sobiesk kick), 11:07 (MSU 38-20)
- AUB – Daniel Carlson 42 yd field goal, 7:43 (MSU 38-23)

Top Passers

- MSU – Dak Prescott 18-34, 246 yds, 1 TD, 2 INT
- AUB – Nick Marshall 17-35, 209 yds, 2 TD, 2 INT

Top Rushers

- MSU – Dak Prescott 21 carries, 121 yds, 2 TD
- AUB – Nick Marshall 17 carries, 100 yds

Top Receiving

- AUB – D'haquille Williams 6 receptions, 108 yds, 2 TD
- MSU – Malcolm Johnson 5 receptions, 60 yds

College GameDay was in town for a road test against the Mississippi State Bulldogs. In their weekly "Saturday Selections" segment, David Pollack, Desmond Howard, Lee Corso, and special guest picker Jonathan Papelbon all picked Mississippi State. Kirk Herbstreit picked Auburn and moderator Chris Fowler did not pick. Two turnovers on the first 2 offensive plays of the game for AU were costly for Auburn as Mississippi State scored 14 points off the turnovers. Mississippi State had four turnovers in the game which led to 13 points for Auburn. The game-changing play was when Ricardo Louis fumbled on a kickoff return leading to a Mississippi State touchdown. The Tigers now lead the all-time series 61–25–2.

=== South Carolina ===
South Carolina Gamecocks at #5 Auburn Tigers – Game summary

Quarter	1	2	3	4	Total
South Carolina	7	14	14	0	35
#5 Auburn	7	14	14	7	42

at Jordan–Hare Stadium • Auburn, Alabama

- Date: October 25, 2014
- Game time: 6:39 p.m. CDT
- Game weather: Temperature: 69 °F (21 °C) • Wind 4 mph (6.4 km/h) NW • Weather: Clear Skies
- Game attendance: 87,451
- Referee: Matt Loeffler
- TV announcers (SEC Network): Brent Musburger (play-by-play), Jesse Palmer (analyst), Maria Taylor (sideline reporter)

Game information

First Quarter

- SC – Shaq Roland 32 yd pass from Dylan Thompson (Elliott Fry kick), 12:34 (SC 7-0)
- AUB – Brandon Fulse 3 yd pass from Nick Marshall (Daniel Carlson kick), 1:33 (TIE 7-7)

Second Quarter

- SC – Pharoh Cooper 16 yd pass from Dylan Thompson (Elliott Fry kick), 12:14 (SC 14-7)
- AUB – Cameron Artis-Payne 2 yd run (Daniel Carlson kick), 8:19 (TIE 14-14)
- SC – Mike Davis 27 yd pass from Dylan Thompson (Elliott Fry kick), 5:05 (SC 21-14)
- AUB – Nick Marshall 37 yd run (Daniel Carlson kick), 2:35 (TIE 21-21)

Third Quarter

- AUB – Nick Marshall 4 yd run (Daniel Carlson kick), 9:30 (AUB 28-21)
- SC – Pharoh Cooper 51 yd pass from Dylan Thompson (Elliott Fry kick), 7:40 (TIE 28-28)
- AUB – Ricardo Louis 75 yd run (Daniel Carlson kick), 7:29 (AUB 35-28)
- SC – Nick Jones 10 yd pass from Dylan Thompson (Elliott Fry kick), 2:20 (TIE 35-35)

Fourth Quarter

- AUB – Nick Marshall 9 yd run (Daniel Carlson kick), 11:22 (AUB 42-35)

Top Passers

- SC – Dylan Thompson 29-50, 402 yds, 5 TD, 3 INT
- AUB – Nick Marshall 12-14, 139 yds, 1 TD

Top Rushers

- AUB – Cameron Artis-Payne 25 carries, 167 yds, 1 TD
- SC – Mike Davis 21 carries, 88 yds

Top Receiving

- SC – Pharoh Cooper 7 receptions, 127 yds, 2 TD
- AUB – Quan Bray 4 receptions, 29 yds

In a game that proved to be a harder challenge than many expected, South Carolina took Auburn down to the wire before the Tiger defense stepped up at the end. An offensive battle took place as neither defense could stop the opposing offense. Each team only punted once during the game and when South Carolina punted Quan Bray fumbled on the return and the ball was recovered by South Carolina. That was the Tigers' only turnover of the game. South Carolina turned the ball over three times (all interceptions) including one inside the twenty yard line, and two in the end zone, which included one on the hail mary attempt as time expired. Cassanova McKinzy had one interception and Jonathan Jones had two interceptions. The Tigers had won a shootout 42-35. An interesting note is that Steve Spurrier "went for it" on 4th down several times, converting all of them except 1. The win was the sixth win of the season for Auburn, which meant they were bowl eligible. With the victory, Auburn's all-time record against South Carolina moved to 10-1-1.

=== Ole Miss ===
#3 Auburn Tigers at #4 Ole Miss Rebels – Game summary

Quarter	1	2	3	4	Total
#4 Auburn	7	7	14	7	35
#7 Ole Miss	7	10	7	7	31

at Vaught–Hemingway Stadium • Oxford, Mississippi

- Date: November 1, 2014
- Game time: 6:05 p.m. CDT
- Game weather: Temperature: 50 °F (10 °C) • Wind NW 9 mph (14 km/h) • Weather: Clear
- Game attendance: 62,090
- Referee: Ken Williamson
- TV announcers (ESPN): Brad Nessler (play-by-play), Todd Blackledge (analyst), Holly Rowe (sideline reporter)

Game information

First Quarter

- AUB – Nick Marshall 2 yd run (Daniel Carlson kick), 12:04 (AUB 7-0)
- MISS – I'Tavius Mathers 4 yd run (Gary Wunderlich kick), 4:00 (TIE 7-7)

Second Quarter

- MISS – Laquon Treadwell 10 yd pass from Bo Wallace (Gary Wunderlich kick), 6:02 (MISS 14-7)
- AUB – Sammie Coates 57 yd pass from Nick Marshall (Daniel Carlson kick), 1:24 (TIE 14-14)
- MISS – Gary Wunderlich 47 yd field goal, 0:00 (MISS 17-14)

Third Quarter

- MISS – Evan Engram 50 yd pass from Bo Wallace (Gary Wunderlich kick), 10:36 (MISS 24-14)
- AUB – Nick Marshall 2 yd run (Daniel Carlson kick), 8:30 (MISS 24-21)
- AUB – Marcus Davis 17 yd pass from Nick Marshall (Daniel Carlson kick), 1:59 (AUB 28-24)

Fourth Quarter

- MISS – Bo Wallace 3 yd run (Gary Wunderlich kick), 14:26 (MISS 31-28)
- AUB – Cameron Artis-Payne 6 yd run (Daniel Carlson kick), 10:23 (AUB 35-31)

Top Passers

- MISS – Bo Wallace 28-40, 362 yds, 2 TD
- AUB – Nick Marshall 15-22, 254 yds, 2 TD, 1 INT

Top Rushers

- AUB – Cameron Artis-Payne 27 carries, 143 yds, 1 TD
- MISS – Bo Wallace 14 carries, 61 yds, 1 TD

Top Receiving

- MISS – Laquon Treadwell 10 receptions, 103 yds, 1 TD
- AUB – Sammie Coates 5 receptions, 122 yds, 1 TD

Auburn struck first after an incomplete pass (the official said Duke Williams bobbled it as he was going out of bounds) was reviewed and overturned. As a result of the review, the ball was placed at the 3-yard line. Nick Marshall then ran into the end zone for the touchdown. Ole Miss started with a punt on offense. Ole Miss struck next after a big run by Bo Wallace. Penalties cost Auburn greatly and they had a season high number of penalties. Nick Marshall also had a turnover in the red zone that also cost the Tigers greatly. Ole Miss was threatening to score with six and a half minutes to go, but Kris Frost knocked the ball out of Bo Wallace's hands resulting in a turnover for Auburn. Later, Auburn recovered a fumble in the end zone after it was ruled a touchdown, but review gave Auburn the ball. At the very end, Auburn came up with one last stop as time expired giving Auburn a 35-31 win. With the win, Auburn is now 29-10 all-time against Ole Miss.

=== Texas A&M ===
Texas A&M Aggies at #3 Auburn Tigers – Game summary

Quarter	1	2	3	4	Total
Texas A&M	14	21	3	3	41
#3 Auburn	14	3	7	14	38

at Jordan–Hare Stadium • Auburn, Alabama

- Date: November 8, 2014
- Game time: 2:38 p.m. CST
- Game weather: Temperature: 61 °F (16 °C) • Wind W 3 mph (4.8 km/h) • Weather: Partly cloudy
- Game attendance: 87,451
- Referee: Matt Moore
- TV announcers (CBS): Carter Blackburn (play-by-play), Aaron Taylor (analyst), Jamie Erdahl (sideline reporter)

Game information

First Quarter

- TAMU – Malcome Kennedy 60 yd pass from Kyle Allen (Josh Lambo kick), 13:32 (TAMU 7-0)
- TAMU – Josh Reynolds 36 yd pass from Kyle Allen (Josh Lambo kick), 12:53 (TAMU 14-0)
- AUB – Cameron Artis-Payne 2 yd run (Daniel Carlson kick), 7:16 (TAMU 14-7)
- AUB – Cameron Artis-Payne 34 yd run (Daniel Carlson kick), 2:32 (TIE 14-14)

Second Quarter

- TAMU – Ricky Seals-Jones 23 yd pass from Kyle Allen (Josh Lambo kick), 13:29 (TAMU 21-14)
- TAMU – Josh Reynolds 7 yd pass from Kyle Allen (Josh Lambo kick), 10:29 (TAMU 28-14)
- AUB – Daniel Carlson 30 yd field goal, 4:14 (TAMU 28-17)
- TAMU – Deshazor Everett 65 yd blocked FG return (Josh Lambo kick), 0:00 (TAMU 35-17)

Third Quarter

- AUB – Nick Marshall 1 yd run (Daniel Carlson kick), 4:41 (TAMU 35-24)
- TAMU – Josh Lambo 22 yd field goal, 0:47 (TAMU 38-24)

Fourth Quarter

- AUB – Quan Bray 31 yd pass from Nick Marshall (Daniel Carlson kick), 14:54 (TAMU 38-31)
- TAMU – Josh Lambo 27 yd field goal, 7:54 (TAMU 41-31)
- AUB – Nick Marshall 6 yd run (Daniel Carlson kick), 6:42 (TAMU 41-38)

Top Passers

- TAMU – Kyle Allen 19-29, 277 yds, 4 TD, 1 INT
- AUB – Nick Marshall 15-21, 219 yds, 1 TD

Top Rushers

- AUB – Cameron Artis-Payne 30 carries, 221 yds, 2 TD
- TAMU – Brandon Williams 12 carries, 68 yds

Top Receiving

- TAMU – Josh Reynolds 6 receptions, 88 yds, 2 TD
- AUB – Quan Bray 6 receptions, 65 yds, 1 TD

Auburn allowed a Texas A&M touchdown early putting the Tigers down 7-0. On the Tigers' first offensive possession, Cameron Artis-Payne fumbled the ball and it was recovered by Texas A&M leading to another Aggies score. Cameron Artis-Payne scored twice in the first quarter making the score 14-14 at the end of the first quarter. Auburn could only muster up a field goal in the second quarter while the defense allowed two A&M touchdowns. On the final play of the second quarter, a Daniel Carlson field goal attempt was blocked and returned for a touchdown making the halftime score Texas A&M 35, Auburn 17. Auburn started to come back in the third quarter, holding A&M to a field goal and scoring a touchdown. On the first play of the fourth quarter, Auburn scored again making the score 38-31 Texas A&M with plenty of time to play. Auburn allowed an A&M field goal, but scored quickly reducing the deficit to three points. With Auburn near the goal line and with less than two minutes remaining, Auburn's Nick Marshall fumbled the ball, and Texas A&M recovered. Auburn's defense then forced a three-and-out with only a little over a minute to play. A field goal would have tied it and a touchdown would have given the Tigers the lead, but a botched snap was recovered by Texas A&M. The Aggies then ran out the clock to upset Auburn 41-38. A&M now leads the series 4-1 all-time.

=== Georgia ===
#9 Auburn Tigers at #16 Georgia Bulldogs – Game summary

Quarter	1	2	3	4	Total
#9 Auburn	7	0	0	0	7
#16 Georgia	7	10	10	7	34

at Sanford Stadium • Athens, Georgia

- Date: November 15, 2014
- Game time: 6:21 p.m. CST
- Game weather: Temperature: 38 °F (3 °C) • Wind E 3 mph (4.8 km/h) • Weather: Clear, cold
- Game attendance: 92,746
- Referee: Matt Austin
- TV announcers (ESPN): Brad Nessler (play-by-play), Todd Blackledge (analyst), Holly Rowe (sideline reporter)

Game information

First Quarter

- AUB – Cameron Artis-Payne 26 yd run (Daniel Carlson kick), 10:52 (AUB 7-0)
- UGA – Malcolm Mitchell 7 yd pass from Hutson Mason (Marshall Morgan kick), 2:15 (TIE 7-7)

Second Quarter

- UGA – Nick Chubb 9 yd run (Marshall Morgan kick), 8:48 (UGA 14-7)
- UGA – Marshall Morgan 32 yd field goal, 0:29 (UGA 17-7)

Third Quarter

- UGA – Todd Gurley 3 yd run (Marshall Morgan kick), 7:28 (UGA 24-7)
- UGA – Marshall Morgan 28 yd field goal, 0:55 (UGA 27-7)

Fourth Quarter

- UGA – Nick Chubb 11 yd run (Marshall Morgan kick), 4:51 (UGA 34-7)

Top Passers

- UGA – Hutson Mason 10-19, 123 yds, 1 TD
- AUB – Nick Marshall 11-23, 112 yds, 1 INT

Top Rushers

- UGA – Nick Chubb 19 carries, 144 yds, 2 TD
- AUB – Cameron Artis-Payne 20 carries, 86 yds, 1 TD

Top Receiving

- AUB – C. J. Uzomah 3 receptions, 39 yds
- UGA – Michael Bennett 3 receptions, 29 yds

The Tigers struck first on the very first possession of the game, but were shut out for the rest of the game. Penalties, turnovers, man defense in the secondary, an all-in quarterback spy, and the inability to stop Georgia's offense contributed to a 34-7 loss. The series is now tied 55-55-8. This game marked the end of Todd Gurley's suspension.

=== Samford ===
Samford Bulldogs at #16 Auburn Tigers – Game summary

Quarter	1	2	3	4	Total
Samford	0	7	0	0	7
#16 Auburn	0	17	7	7	31

at Jordan–Hare Stadium • Auburn, Alabama

- Date: November 22, 2014
- Game time: 6:03 p.m. CST
- Game weather: Temperature: 57 °F (14 °C) • Wind E 9 mph (14 km/h) • Weather: Cloudy
- Game attendance: 87,451
- Referee: David Smith
- TV announcers (ESPNU): Clay Matvick (play-by-play), Anthony Becht (analyst)

Game information

Second Quarter

- SAM – Tony Philpot 7 yd pass from Michael Eubank (Warren Handrahan kick), 7:49 (SAM 7-0)
- AUB – Quan Bray 23 yd run (Daniel Carlson kick), 6:50 (TIE 7-7)
- AUB – Daniel Carlson 29 yd field goal, 2:24 (AUB 10-7)
- AUB – Cameron Artis-Payne 7 yd run (Daniel Carlson kick), 0:39 (AUB 17-7)

Third Quarter

- AUB – Corey Grant 13 yd pass from Nick Marshall (Daniel Carlson kick), 8:36 (AUB 24-7)

Fourth Quarter

- AUB – Roc Thomas 1 yd run (Daniel Carlson kick), 8:44 (AUB 31-7)

Top Passers

- AUB – Nick Marshall 11-18, 171 yds, 1 TD, 1 INT
- SAM – Michael Eubank 15-29, 125 yds, 1 TD, 2 INT

Top Rushers

- AUB – Cameron Artis-Payne 24 carries, 129 yds, 1 TD
- SAM – Denzel Williams 15 carries, 41 yds

Top Receiving

- SAM – Karel Hamilton 5 receptions, 67 yds
- AUB – Quan Bray 4 receptions, 56 yds

After a scoreless first quarter, Samford scored first in the second quarter. However, Auburn scored 31 unanswered en route to an easy 31-7 win on Senior Night. Samford coach Pat Sullivan played at Auburn, and was the Tigers' first Heisman Trophy winner. Auburn now leads the series 27-0-1. Auburn kept star receivers Duke Williams and Ricardo Louis out of the game so they could nurse injuries before the Iron Bowl rivalry game against Alabama.

=== Alabama ===
#15 Auburn Tigers at #2 Alabama Crimson Tide – Game summary

Quarter	1	2	3	4	Total
#15 Auburn	6	20	10	8	44
#1 Alabama	14	7	13	21	55

at Bryant–Denny Stadium • Tuscaloosa, Alabama

- Date: November 29, 2014
- Game time: 6:52 p.m. CST
- Game weather: Temperature: 60 °F (16 °C) • Wind S 12 mph (19 km/h) • Weather: Cloudy, Breezy
- Game attendance: 101,821
- Referee: Hubert Owens
- TV announcers (ESPN): Brent Musburger (play-by-play), Jesse Palmer (analyst), Maria Taylor (sideline reporter)

Game information

First Quarter

- ALA – T. J. Yeldon 8 yd run (Gunnar Raborn kick), 12:47 (ALA 7-0)
- AUB – Daniel Carlson 20 yd field goal, 8:08 (ALA 7-3)
- ALA – Amari Cooper 17 yd pass from Blake Sims (Gunnar Raborn kick), 6:17 (ALA 14-3)
- AUB – Daniel Carlson 24 yd field goal, 2:57 (ALA 14-6)

Second Quarter

- AUB – Daniel Carlson 24 yd field goal, 11:01 (ALA 14-9)
- AUB – Sammie Coates 34 yd pass from Nick Marshall (Daniel Carlson kick), 10:16 (AUB 16-14)
- ALA – T. J. Yeldon 1 yd run (Gunnar Raborn kick), 1:23 (ALA 21-16)
- AUB – Sammie Coates 68 yd pass from Nick Marshall (Daniel Carlson kick), 0:54 (AUB 23-21)
- AUB – Daniel Carlson 20 yd field goal, 0:00 (AUB 26-21)

Third Quarter

- AUB – Quan Bray 5 yd pass from Nick Marshall (Daniel Carlson kick), 11:02 (AUB 33-21)
- ALA – Amari Cooper 39 yd pass from Blake Sims, 8:01 (AUB 33-27)
- AUB – Daniel Carlson 33 yd field goal, 3:30 (AUB 36-27)
- ALA – Amari Cooper 75 yd pass from Blake Sims (Adam Griffith kick), 3:20 (AUB 36-34)

Fourth Quarter

- ALA – Blake Sims 11 yd run (DeAndrew White pass from Blake Sims), 14:33 (ALA 42-36)
- ALA – DeAndrew White 6 yd pass from Blake Sims, 8:05 (ALA 48-36)
- ALA – Derrick Henry 25 yd run (Adam Griffith kick), 3:46 (ALA 55-36)
- AUB – Corey Grant 5 yd run (Nick Marshall rush), 0:20 (ALA 55-44)

Top Passers

- AUB – Nick Marshall 27-43, 456 yds, 3 TD, 1 INT
- ALA – Blake Sims 20-27, 312 yds, 4 TD, 3 INT

Top Rushers

- ALA – T. J. Yeldon 19 carries, 127 yds, 2 TD
- AUB – Cameron Artis-Payne 25 carries, 77 yds

Top Receiving

- ALA – Amari Cooper 13 receptions, 224 yds, 3 TD
- AUB – D'haquille Williams 7 receptions, 121 yds

In the twelfth and final game of the regular season, Auburn traveled to Tuscaloosa to face their arch-rival Alabama. Alabama now leads the overall series 43–35–1. College GameDay was in Tuscaloosa for this game, making it the second time the traveling show was live from the location of an Auburn game this season (October 11 vs. Mississippi State). Every analyst picked Alabama to win. On the first play from scrimmage, Auburn turned the ball over on a failed lateral from Nick Marshall to Roc Thomas and Alabama scored on the drive after the fumble. Alabama scored again after Auburn got to the three yard line, but had to settle for a field goal. Auburn then scored ten unanswered points before the defense allowed a late Alabama drive for a touchdown on 4th and goal. Auburn then scored ten more unanswered points after the touchdown and after a Blake Sims interception. The halftime score was Auburn 26 and Alabama 20.

At the beginning of the fourth quarter, Alabama scored a touchdown and completed a two-point conversion to take the lead at 42-36. Auburn regained possession of the ball, but Nick Marshall was unable to make a 3rd-down conversion and the ball was punted back to Alabama. The Auburn defense was unable to prevent Alabama from rapidly progressing downfield and scoring with a touchdown pass to DeAndrew White. This made the score 48-36 Alabama. Saban opted to attempt another 2-point conversion to widen the gap, but this failed when Blake Sims was pushed out of bounds.

Upon repossession of the ball, Auburn successfully completed passes downfield but was unable to make a first down. Alabama regained the ball.

=== Wisconsin ===
2015 Outback Bowl
#19 Auburn Tigers vs #17 Wisconsin Badgers – Game summary

Quarter	1	2	3	4	OT	Total
#19 Auburn	7	7	3	14	0	31
#17 Wisconsin	7	0	14	10	3	34

at Raymond James Stadium • Tampa, Florida

- Date: January 1, 2015
- Game time: 11:00 a.m. CST
- Game weather: Temperature: • Wind: • Weather:
- Referee: Mike Defee
- TV announcers (ESPN2): Bob Wischusen (play-by-play), Matt Millen (analyst), Quint Kessenich (sideline reporter)

On December 7, it was announced that #19 Auburn and #18 Wisconsin would meet in the Outback Bowl. Auburn fired defensive coordinator Ellis Johnson prior to this game and it was announced that Charlie Harbison would be the interim defensive coordinator for this game. Wisconsin's coach Gary Andersen left for Oregon State so the Badgers' athletic director Barry Alvarez will coach the Badgers in this game. The all-time series is tied 1-1-1 and Wisconsin won the last meeting 28–14 in the 2006 Capital One Bowl. With the win, Wisconsin takes the series lead 2-1-1.

== Rankings ==
Ranking movements Legend: ██ Increase in ranking ██ Decrease in ranking ( ) = First-place votes
	Week																
Poll	Pre	1	2	3	4	5	6	7	8	9	10	11	12	13	14	15	Final
AP	6	5	5	5	5	5	2 (23)	6	5	4	3	9	16	15	20	19	22
Coaches	5	5	5	5	5	5	2 (16)	8	6	4	3	9	17	16	21	19	23
CFP	Not released									3	3	9	14	15	19	19	Not released

== 2015 NFL draft ==
Auburn had five players selected in the 2015 NFL draft.

Name	Position	Round	Pick	Team
Sammie Coates	WR	3	87	Pittsburgh Steelers
Angelo Blackson	DT	4	100	Tennessee Titans
Gabe Wright	DT	4	113	Detroit Lions
C. J. Uzomah	TE	5	157	Cincinnati Bengals
Cameron Artis-Payne	RB	5	174	Carolina Panthers

=== Undrafted free agents ===
Name	Position	Team
Reese Dismukes	C	Pittsburgh Steelers
Nick Marshall	CB/QB	Jacksonville Jaguars
Corey Grant	RB	Jacksonville Jaguars
Jermaine Whitehead	S	San Francisco 49ers
Chad Slade	OG	Houston Texans
Quan Bray	WR	Indianapolis Colts
Trovon Reed	CB	Seattle Seahawks
Patrick Miller	OT	San Francisco 49ers
Robensen Therezie	S	Atlanta Falcons
Johnathan Mincy	CB	Atlanta Falcons
Brandon Fulse	TE	Chicago Bears
Brandon King	LB/S	New England Patriots
