= Sen'Derrick Marks =

American football player (born 1987)

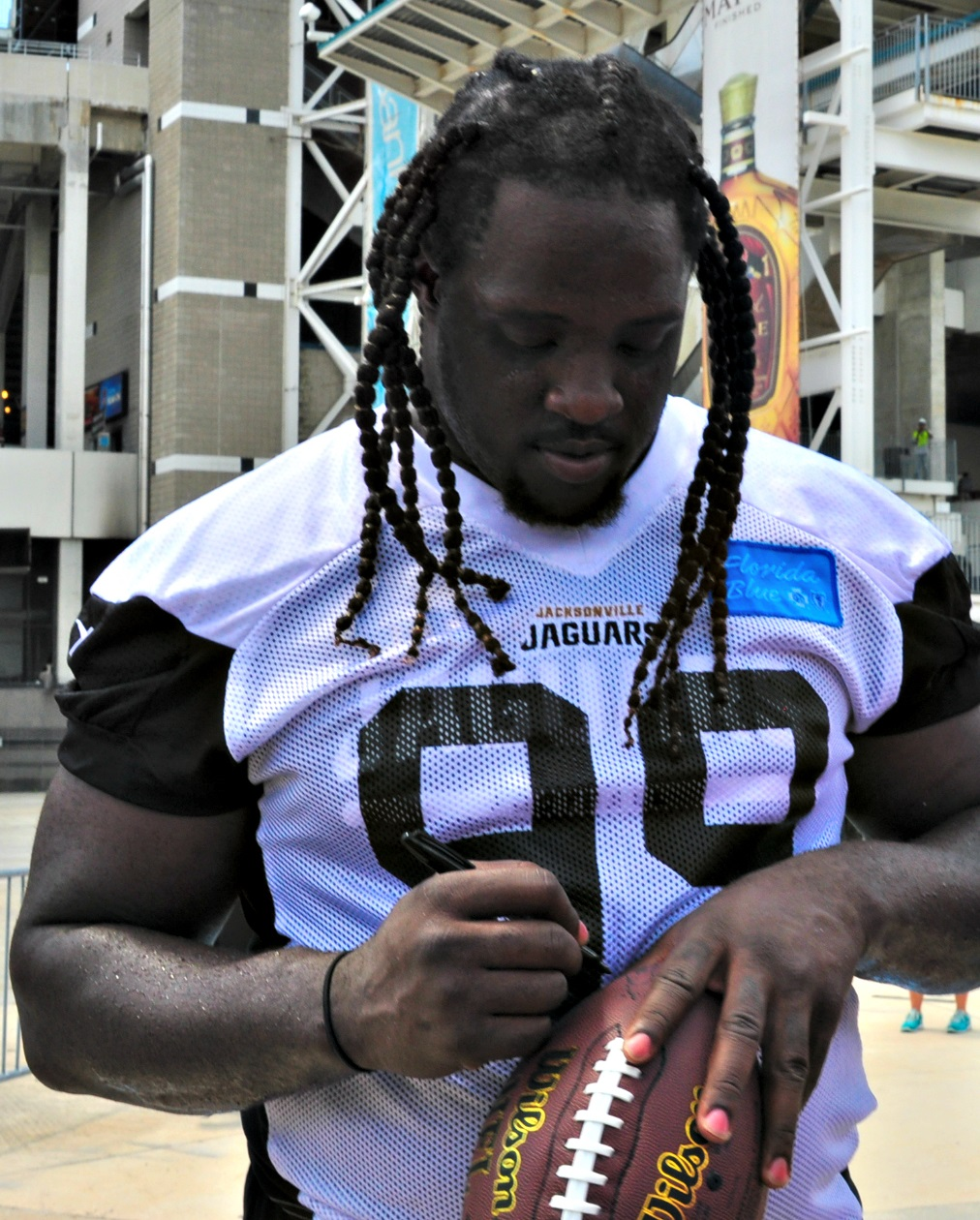
- Marks with the Jacksonville Jaguars in 2014

No. 94, 99
- Position: Defensive tackle

Personal information
- Born: February 23, 1987 (age 39); Mobile, Alabama, U.S.
- Listed height: 6 ft 1 in (1.85 m)
- Listed weight: 300 lb (136 kg)

Career information
- High school: Vigor (Prichard, Alabama)
- College: Auburn (2005–2008)
- NFL draft: 2009: 2nd round, 62nd overall pick

Career history
- Tennessee Titans (2009–2012); Jacksonville Jaguars (2013–2016); San Francisco 49ers (2017)*
- * Offseason or practice squad member only

Awards and highlights
- Second-team All-SEC (2008)

Career NFL statistics
- Total tackles: 205
- Sacks: 19
- Forced fumbles: 5
- Fumble recoveries: 5
- Interceptions: 1
- Stats at Pro Football Reference

Sen'Derrick Dewayne Marks (born February 23, 1987) is an American former professional football player who was a defensive tackle in the National Football League (NFL). He played college football for the Auburn Tigers, and was selected by the Tennessee Titans in the second round of the 2009 NFL draft. He also played for the Jacksonville Jaguars.

== Early life ==
Marks attended Vigor High School in Prichard, Alabama. He played high school football for the Wolves.

== College career ==
Marks played for Auburn under head coach Tommy Tuberville from 2005 to 2008.

On September 22, 2007, Marks recorded an interception against New Mexico State.

On December 30, 2008, Marks announced he would forgo his senior season at Auburn and enter the 2009 NFL draft.

Marks finished his collegiate career with 115 total tackles, 7.5 sacks, one interception, four passes defensed, and one forced fumble.

- Coaches Freshman All-SEC Team (2006)
- The Sporting News Freshman All-America Third Team (2006)
- Rivals.com First-Team Freshman All-American (2006)
- The Sporting News SEC All-Freshman Team (2006)
- Mark Dorminey Defensive MVP Award (2008)

== Professional career ==
=== Tennessee Titans ===
Marks was selected by the Tennessee Titans in the second round with the 62nd overall pick of the 2009 NFL draft. He made his NFL debut in Week 4 of the 2009 season against the Jacksonville Jaguars and recorded a solo tackle in the 37–17 loss. In the 2009 regular season finale against the Seattle Seahawks, Marks recorded his first career sack against Matt Hasselbeck.

In Week 3 of the 2010 season against the New York Giants, Marks recorded his first professional interception off of Eli Manning. He made his first start against the Philadelphia Eagles in Week 7.

For the first time in his professional career, Marks appeared in all 16 games and made nine starts in 2011.

Marks appeared in and started 14 games for the Titans in the 2012 season. He recorded 1.5 sacks, 41 total tackles, six quarterback hits, three passes defensed, and one forced fumble.

=== Jacksonville Jaguars ===
Marks was signed by the Jacksonville Jaguars on April 2, 2013. He had his productive season as a professional in his first season with Jaguars. He started all 16 games and recorded four sacks, 34 total tackles, six tackles-for-loss, ten quarterback hits, eight passes defensed, and two forced fumbles.

Marks continued his productive stint with the Jaguars in the 2014 season. He started all 16 games and recorded 8.5 sacks, 44 total tackles, 15 tackles-for-loss, 17 quarterback hits, and three passes defensed. Marks tore his ACL in the regular season finale against the Houston Texans. After the 2014 season, Marks was ranked 76th on the NFL Top 100 Players of 2015 by his fellow players.

Marks only played in four games in the 2015 season due to knee and triceps injuries. The triceps injury occurred in Week 10 against the Baltimore Ravens.

Marks returned from his injury and played in all 16 games in the 2016 season. He recorded 3.5 sacks, 22 total tackles, seven tackles-for-loss, nine quarterback hits, and one pass defensed.

On March 9, 2017, Marks was released by the Jaguars.

=== San Francisco 49ers ===
On August 23, 2017, Marks signed with the San Francisco 49ers. He was released by the 49ers on September 2.

== NFL career statistics ==
Legend
**Bold**	Career high

Year	Team	Games		Tackles					Interceptions					Fumbles			
Year	Team	GP	GS	Cmb	Solo	Ast	Sck	TFL	Int	Yds	TD	Lng	PD	FF	FR	Yds	TD
2009	TEN	9	0	12	7	5	1.0	1	0	0	0	0	1	0	0	0	0
2010	TEN	12	3	22	14	8	0.0	2	**1**	−6	0	−6	3	1	0	0	0
2011	TEN	**16**	9	24	15	9	0.5	2	0	0	0	0	1	1	0	0	0
2012	TEN	14	14	41	30	**11**	1.5	3	0	0	0	0	3	1	0	0	0
2013	JAX	**16**	**16**	34	28	6	4.0	6	0	0	0	0	**8**	**2**	**3**	**15**	0
2014	JAX	**16**	**16**	**44**	**34**	10	**8.5**	**15**	0	0	0	0	3	0	1	0	0
2015	JAX	4	2	6	4	2	0.0	2	0	0	0	0	3	0	0	0	0
2016	JAX	**16**	1	22	18	4	3.5	7	0	0	0	0	1	0	1	0	0
Career		103	61	205	150	55	19.0	38	1	-6	0	0	23	5	5	15	0
