= David Windham =

American football player (born 1961)

Dave Windham
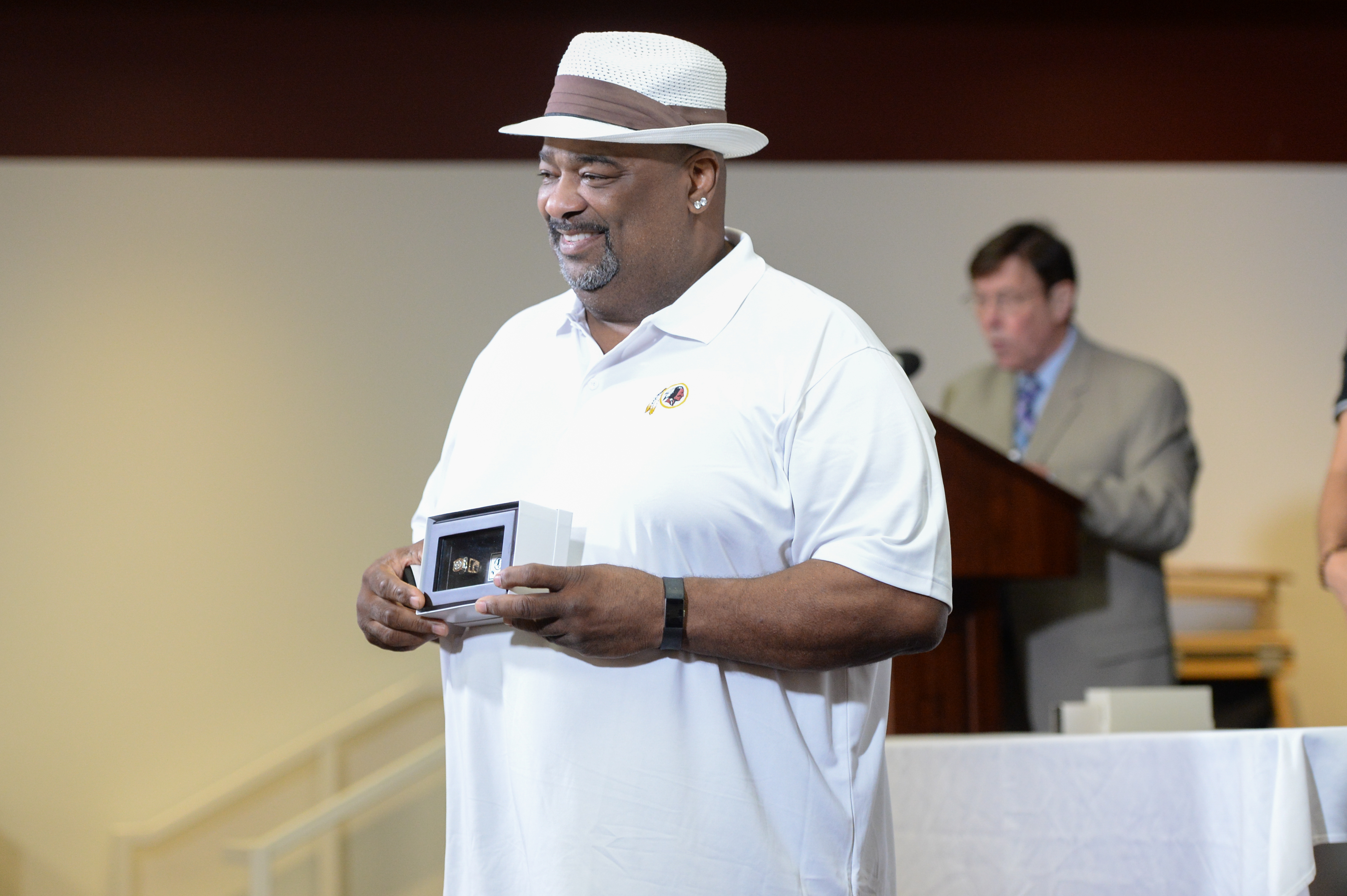
- Windham receiving his Super Bowl ring at a ceremony held in 2018

No. 58
- Position: Linebacker

Personal information
- Born: March 14, 1961 (age 65); Mobile, Alabama, U.S.
- Listed height: 6 ft 2 in (1.88 m)
- Listed weight: 240 lb (109 kg)

Career information
- High school: C.F. Vigor (Prichard, Alabama)
- College: Jackson State
- NFL draft: 1984: 9th round, 251st overall pick

Career history
- New England Patriots (1984)*; Washington Redskins (1987)
- * Offseason or practice squad member only

Career NFL statistics
- Games played: 3
- Stats at Pro Football Reference

David Rogers Windham (born March 14, 1961) is an American former professional football player who was a linebacker for the Washington Redskins of the National Football League (NFL) in 1987 NFL season. He played college football for the Jackson State Tigers and was selected in the ninth round of the 1984 NFL draft by the New England Patriots.

== Early life ==
Windham was born in Mobile, Alabama and attended C.F. Vigor High School in Prichard, Alabama. He then attended and played college football at Jackson State University.

== Professional career ==
Windham was selected in the ninth round of the 1984 NFL draft by the New England Patriots, but never played for the team. He was signed in 1987 by the Washington Redskins. The 1987 season began with a 24-day players' strike, reducing the 16-game season to 15. The games for weeks 4–6 were won with all replacement players, including Windham. The Redskins have the distinction of being the only team with no players crossing the picket line. Those three victories are often credited with getting the team into the playoffs and the basis for the 2000 film The Replacements.

In 2018, Windham was awarded a Super Bowl ring for playing for the Redskins in 1987, the year they won Super Bowl XXII.
