= Terrance Simmons =

American football player (born 1976)

No. 59
- Position: Defensive tackle

Personal information
- Born: May 3, 1976 (age 50); Moss Point, Mississippi, U.S.
- Listed height: 6 ft 8 in (2.03 m)
- Listed weight: 310 lb (141 kg)

Career information
- High school: Vigor (Prichard, Alabama)
- College: Alabama State
- NFL draft: 2001: undrafted

Career history
- Washington Redskins (2000)*; Frankfurt Galaxy (2001); Washington Redskins (2001); Frankfurt Galaxy (2002); Carolina Panthers (2002)
- * Offseason or practice squad member only

Career NFL statistics
- Games played: 2
- Stats at Pro Football Reference

Terrance Demon Simmons (born May 3, 1976) is an American former professional football player who was a defensive tackle in the National Football League (NFL). He played college football for the Alabama State Hornets. Simmons played two games in the NFL for the Carolina Panthers in 2002 and was previously signed with the Washington Redskins.
