= Quinterrius Eatmon =

American football player (born 1991)

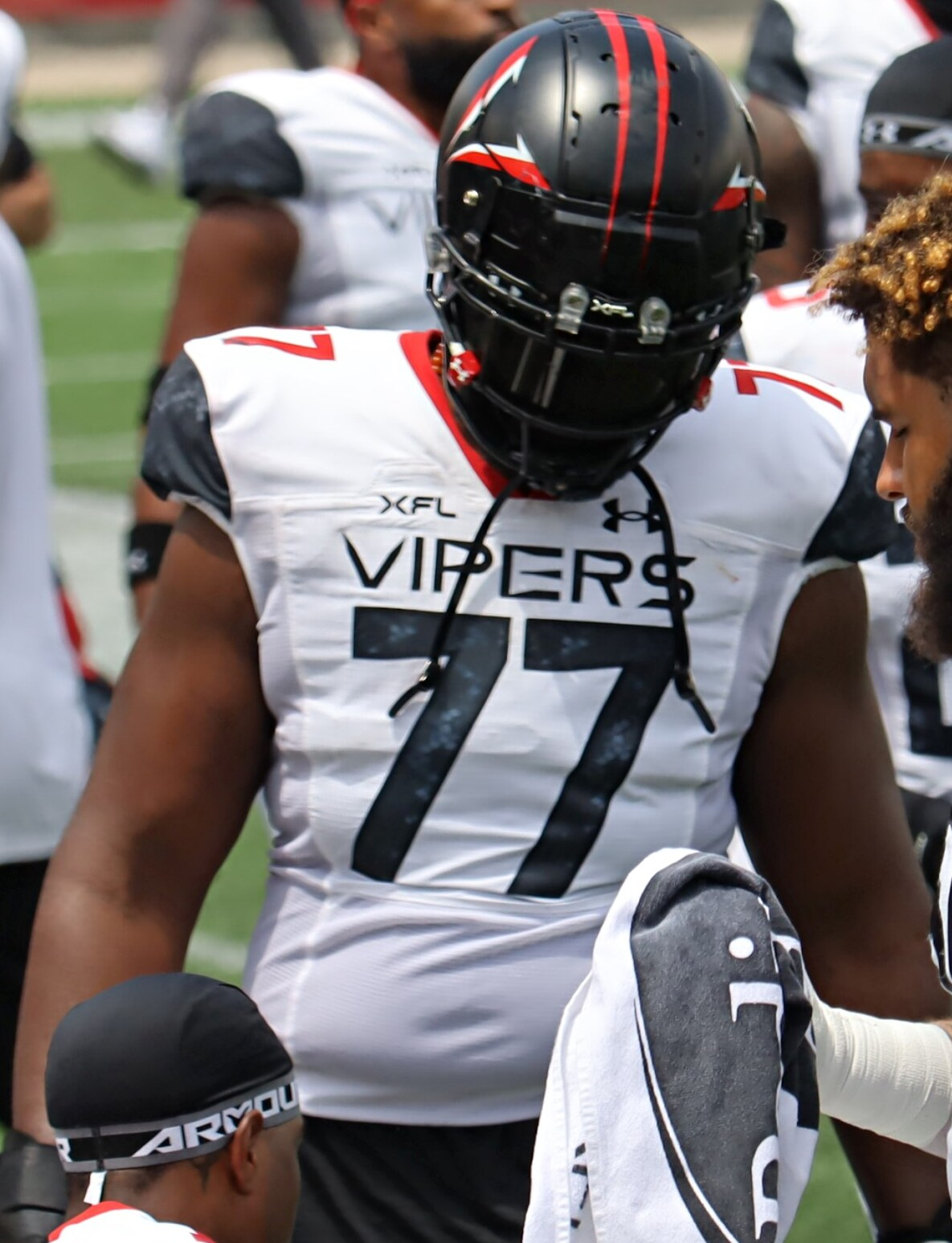
- Eatmon with the Vegas Vipers in 2023

No. 50, 70, 77
- Position: Offensive tackle

Personal information
- Born: December 4, 1991 (age 34)
- Listed height: 6 ft 6 in (1.98 m)
- Listed weight: 313 lb (142 kg)

Career information
- High school: Vigor (Prichard, Alabama)
- College: South Florida (2010–2014)

Career history
- 2015: Oakland Raiders*
- 2016: Saskatchewan Roughriders*
- 2016: Ottawa Redblacks*
- 2017: Montreal Alouettes*
- 2017: Hamilton Tiger-Cats
- 2018: Carolina Panthers*
- 2019: Orlando Apollos
- 2020: Seattle Dragons
- 2023: Vegas Vipers
- * Offseason or practice squad member only

Awards and highlights
- Grey Cup champion (2016); Second-team All-AAC (2014)
- Stats at CFL.ca

Quinterrius Eatmon (born December 4, 1991) is an American former professional football offensive tackle. He played college football at South Florida. He was a member of the Oakland Raiders and Carolina Panthers of the National Football League (NFL), the Saskatchewan Roughriders, Ottawa Redblacks, Montreal Alouettes, and Hamilton Tiger-Cats of the Canadian Football League (CFL), the Orlando Apollos of the Alliance of American Football (AAF), and the Seattle Dragons and Vegas Vipers of the XFL.

== Early life ==
Eatmon played high school football at Vigor High School in Prichard, Alabama. He underwent a heart procedure during his senior year of high school after missing two games due to heart problems. He was rated the No. 75 offensive tackle in the country by Rivals.com, the No. 79 offensive tackle by Scout.com, and the No. 39 overall prospect in Alabama by Rivals.com. Eatmon chose to attend the University of South Florida over offers from Mississippi State, Louisville and South Carolina.

== College career ==
Eatmon played college football for the South Florida Bulls from 2011 to 2014. He was redshirted in 2010. He started all 12 games in 2011, earning Yahoo! Sports Freshman All-American honors. Eatmon played in all 12 games, starting 11, in 2012. He appeared in 11 games, all starts, during the 2013 season before missing the final game due to injury. He started all 12 games in 2014 and was named second-team American Athletic Conference by Phil Steele. Eatmon graduated in December 2014 with an economics degree.

In 2014, he was a finalist for the Uplifting Athletes Rare Disease Champion Award. His daughter was born blind due to septo-optic dysplasia. Her eyesight later improved after surgery.

== Professional career ==
After going undrafted in the 2015 NFL draft, Eatmon signed with the Oakland Raiders on May 8, 2015. He was waived on August 27, 2015.

Eatmon was signed by the Saskatchewan Roughriders of the Canadian Football League (CFL) on January 25, 2016. He was released by the Roughriders on April 19, 2016.

He was signed to the practice roster of the Ottawa Redblacks of the CFL on October 5, 2016. On November 27, 2016, the Redblacks won the 104th Grey Cup against the Calgary Stampeders.

Eatmon signed with the CFL's Montreal Alouettes on May 24, 2017. He was released on June 17, 2017.

He was signed to the practice roster of the Hamilton Tiger-Cats of the CFL on July 13, 2017. He was promoted to the active roster on July 28 and dressed in two games, both starts, for the Tiger-Cats before being released on August 8, 2017.

He played in The Spring League in 2018.

Eatmon signed with the NFL's Carolina Panthers on May 14, 2018. He was waived by the Panthers on August 31, 2018.

Eatmon started all eight games for the Orlando Apollos of the Alliance of American Football (AAF) in 2019 before the AAF suspended operations.

He was selected by the Seattle Dragons in the offensive line phase of the 2020 XFL draft. He started all five games for the Dragons in 2020 before the rest of the season was cancelled due to the COVID-19 pandemic.

Eatmon was selected by the Vegas Vipers in the offensive line phase of the 2023 XFL draft. He played in nine games, starting seven, for the Vipers during the 2023 season.
