= Jalston Fowler =

American football player (born 1990)

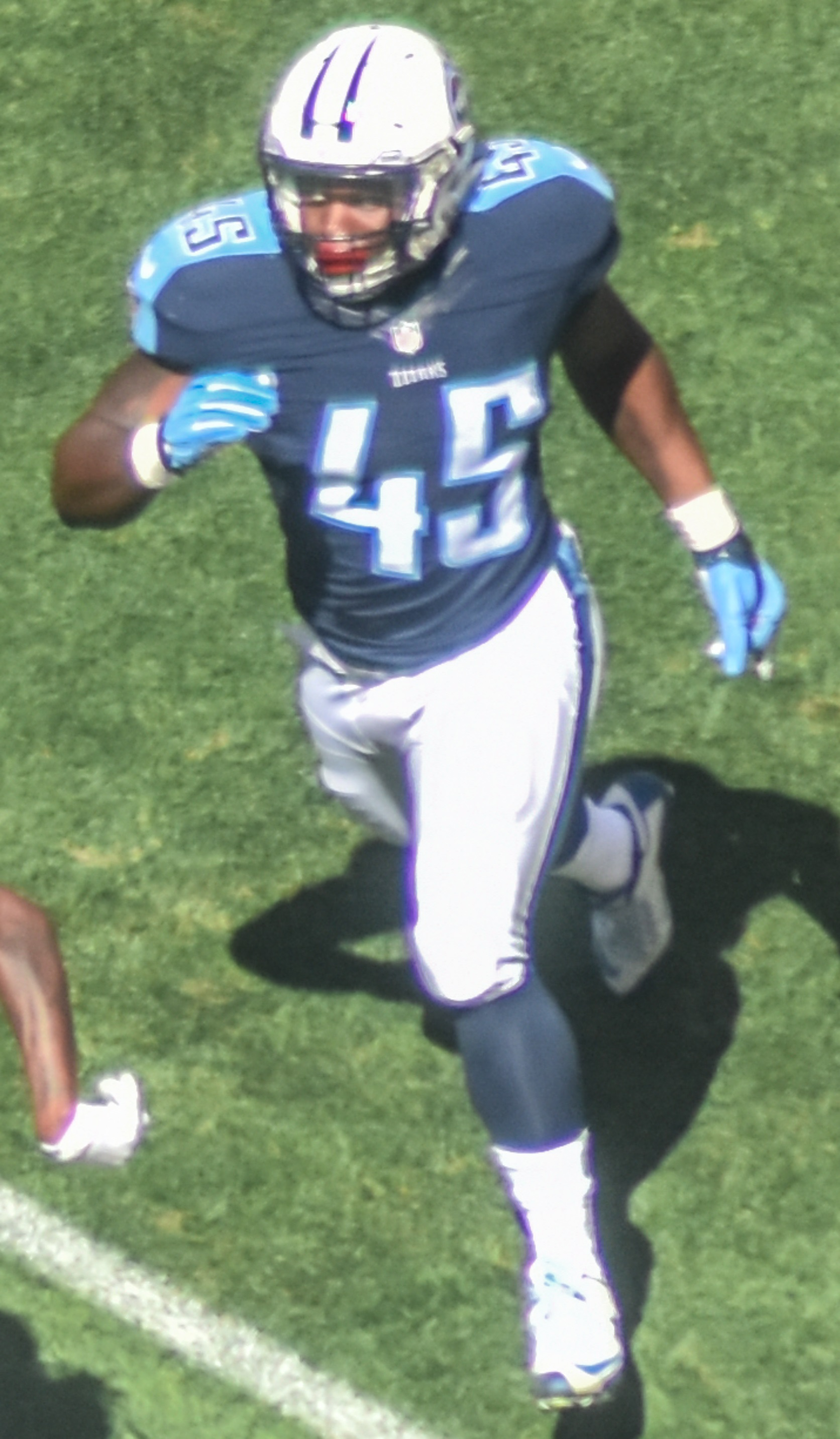
- Fowler with the Tennessee Titans in 2015

No. 45
- Position: Fullback

Personal information
- Born: July 26, 1990 (age 36); Mobile, Alabama, U.S.
- Listed height: 5 ft 11 in (1.80 m)
- Listed weight: 261 lb (118 kg)

Career information
- High school: Vigor (Prichard, Alabama)
- College: Alabama
- NFL draft: 2015: 4th round, 108th overall pick

Career history
- Tennessee Titans (2015–2017); Seattle Seahawks (2017–2018)*; Atlanta Falcons (2018)*; Tennessee Titans (2018)
- * Offseason or practice squad member only

Awards and highlights
- 2× BCS national champion (2011, 2012)

Career NFL statistics
- Rushing attempts: 10
- Rushing yards: 20
- Rushing touchdowns: 2
- Receptions: 6
- Receiving yards: 58
- Receiving touchdowns: 1
- Stats at Pro Football Reference

Jalston Demontrez Fowler Sr. (born July 26, 1990) is an American former professional football player who was a fullback in the National Football League (NFL). He played college football for the Alabama Crimson Tide, and was selected by the Tennessee Titans in the fourth round of the 2015 NFL draft. Fowler was also a member of the Seattle Seahawks and Atlanta Falcons.

== Early life ==
Fowler was a four-star running back out of Vigor High School in Prichard, Alabama. As a junior in 2008, he rushed for 1,182 yards and 25 touchdowns and also caught 27 passes for 391 yards and a score, leading his team to the 5A Alabama State Championship. For his efforts, Fowler was an Alabama Sports Writers Association Class 5A All-State selection. As a senior in 2009, he was named a Birmingham News Super Senior and was named All-American at running back by SuperPrep.

Fowler also participated in track & field at Vigor, posting personal-best times of 11.86 seconds in the 100-meter dash and 24.18 seconds in the 200-meter dash as a senior. He was also a starter on the basketball team.

Fowler was listed as the No. 2 fullback nationally by Scout.com. He was rated as the No. 9 player in the state of Alabama by SuperPrep. Fowler was No. 10 on The Mobile Press-Register's Elite 18 and No. 97 in the publication's Super Southeast 120. Tom Lemming ranked him as the No. 20 fullback in the nation. Fowler enrolled at the University of Alabama in January 2010 to get a head start in spring practice.

== Professional career ==
Pre-draft measurables
Height	Weight	Arm length	Hand span	40-yard dash	10-yard split	20-yard split	20-yard shuttle	Three-cone drill	Vertical jump	Broad jump	Bench press
5 ft 11 in (1.80 m)	254 lb (115 kg)	32 3/4 in (0.83 m)	10 1/2 in (0.27 m)	4.86 s	1.63 s	2.75 s	4.40 s	7.56 s	33.5 in (0.85 m)	9 ft 6 in (2.90 m)	23 reps
All values from NFL Combine, 40-yard dash from Pro Day

=== Tennessee Titans (first stint) ===
Fowler was selected by the Tennessee Titans in the fourth round (108th overall) of the 2015 NFL draft. On September 27, 2015, he recorded his first NFL professional touchdown on a one-yard rush in the fourth quarter of a narrow 35–33 loss to the Indianapolis Colts.

On September 17, 2017, Fowler recorded his second career touchdown, a three-yard rush in the fourth quarter, in a 37–16 road victory over the Jacksonville Jaguars. On December 9, Fowler was waived by the Titans.

=== Seattle Seahawks ===
On December 12, 2017, Fowler was signed to the practice squad of the Seattle Seahawks. He signed a reserve/future contract with the Seahawks on January 3, 2018. He was waived on August 12.

=== Atlanta Falcons ===
On August 20, 2018, Fowler signed with the Atlanta Falcons. He was waived on September 1.

=== Tennessee Titans (second stint) ===
On October 29, 2018, Fowler was re-signed by the Tennessee Titans. Instead of wearing his original jersey number of 45, he switched to number 40. Fowler was inactive for his first game back with the Titans in Week 9. Fowler was released on November 13 after being inactive for his first two games back.

== NFL career statistics ==
Year	Team	Games		Rushing					Receiving					Fumbles	
Year	Team	GP	GS	Att	Yds	Avg	Lng	TD	Rec	Yds	Avg	Lng	TD	Fum	Lost
2015	TEN	16	0	7	13	1.9	3	1	5	44	8.8	19	1	0	0
2016	TEN	16	7	1	3	3.0	3	0	1	14	14.0	14	0	0	0
2017	TEN	10	1	2	4	2.0	3T	1	0	0	0.0	0	0	0	0
Career		42	8	10	20	2.0	3T	2	6	58	9.7	19	1	0	0

== Personal life ==
Fowler has two sons, Jalston Jr. and Jayce. He and his wife, BreShawn, got married on February 17, 2019. Fowler graduated with a degree in human environmental science from Alabama in 2013 and received his master's degree in sports management from Alabama in 2015. Fowler's brother, Joe, was accidentally shot and killed at a friend's house in 2007.
