= Pat Howell (baseball) =

American baseball player (born 1968)

- Center fielder
- Born: August 31, 1968 (age 57); Mobile, Alabama
- Batted: Both Threw: Right

MLB debut
- July 10, 1992, for the New York Mets

Last MLB appearance
- October 4, 1992, for the New York Mets

MLB statistics
- Batting average: .187
- Home runs: 0
- Runs batted in: 1

CPBL statistics
- Batting average: .264
- Home runs: 0
- Runs batted in: 5
- Stats at Baseball Reference

Teams
- New York Mets (1992); Brother Elephants (1998)

Patrick O'Neal Howell (born August 31, 1968) is an American former professional baseball player. He played part of one season in Major League Baseball for the New York Mets in 1992, primarily as a center fielder. He also played one season in the Chinese Professional Baseball League in 1998. Howell's strength as an athlete was blazing speed. He stole a lot of bases in the minor leagues and exhibited brilliant defense as a centerfielder wherever he played, including in the major leagues as a member of the New York Mets. However, he was not a strong hitter.

== Early life ==
Howell was born in Mobile, Alabama and attended Vigor High School in Prichard, Alabama.

== Professional career ==
=== New York Mets ===
The Mets initially drafted Howell in the 9th round of the 1987 amateur draft. After playing with their minor league baseball system for five seasons, he made his major league debut in 1992. He got a hit in his first big league at bat against the Astros' Pete Harnisch. That season, he batted a .187 with no home runs and 1 run batted in in 79 at bats over 31 games.

=== Minor leagues and overseas ===
After the 1992 season, he was traded to the Minnesota Twins for Darren Reed. After playing one season in their farm system without returning to the majors, he became a free agent and re-signed with the Mets. After one season with the Mets, he left the affiliated minors, playing in the Mexican League from 1995 to 1997.

In 1998, Howell crossed the Pacific to play for the Brother Elephants in Taiwan, batting .264 in 24 games. He returned to the United States in 1999 with the Duluth–Superior Dukes in the Northern League. He played the next four seasons with the Nashua Pride of the Atlantic League before suffering a knee injury in July 2004. He tried to come back the following year but did not play professionally again.

As a minor leaguer, Howell batted .249 with 20 home runs and 290 runs batted in 1133 games.
