= Don Reese =

American football player (1951–2003)

No. 76, 60
- Position: Defensive end

Personal information
- Born: September 4, 1951; Mobile, Alabama, U.S.
- Died: September 18, 2003 (aged 52); Prichard, Alabama, U.S.
- Listed height: 6 ft 6 in (1.98 m)
- Listed weight: 254 lb (115 kg)

Career information
- High school: Vigor (Prichard, Alabama)
- College: Jackson State
- NFL draft: 1974: 1st round, 26th overall pick

Career history
- Miami Dolphins (1974–1976); New Orleans Saints (1978–1980); San Diego Chargers (1981); Birmingham Stallions (1985)

Career NFL statistics
- Games played: 88
- Games started: 37
- Fumble recoveries: 4
- Stats at Pro Football Reference

Donald Francis Reese (September 4, 1951 – September 18, 2003) was an American professional football player who was a defensive end in the National Football League (NFL) and United States Football League (USFL). He played professionally for the Miami Dolphins, the New Orleans Saints and the San Diego Chargers and the Birmingham Stallions of the USFL.

== Early life and education ==
Reese was born in Mobile, Alabama and graduated from Vigor High School in Prichard, Alabama. He played college football at Jackson State University.

== Career ==
Reese was a first-round selection (26th overall pick) of the 1974 NFL draft by the Miami Dolphins. He played for the Dolphins from 1974 to 1976, but missed the 1977 NFL season after being arrested on May 4, 1977, along with teammate Randy Crowder, on charges of selling one pound (0.45 kg) of cocaine to two undercover agents in Miami. After pleading no contest on August 10, Reese and Crowder were sentenced to one year incarceration at the Dade County Stockade, followed by four years probation, a remarkably light sentence given the charges.

After his release, Reese went on to play for the New Orleans Saints (1978–1980), and the San Diego Chargers (1981). In 1985 Reese played for the Birmingham Stallions in the United States Football League.

Reese was suspended for the final four games of the 1980 season by interim coach Dick Stanfel for instigating a fight during a practice with teammate Derland Moore. Stanfel was conducting his first practice session as Saints coach after taking over for Dick Nolan, who was fired after the Saints fell to 0-12 in a loss to the Los Angeles Rams on Monday Night Football. New Orleans finished 1-15, becoming the first NFL team to lose 15 games in a season.

In June 1982, Reese authored a lengthy article for Sports Illustrated in which he detailed his struggles with drugs. This was one of the first looks into the seedy world of money and drug use in the NFL. .

Reese was named the Jackson State All-Century Team and was inducted into the JSU Athletic Hall of Fame

== Death ==
On September 18, 2003, Reese died in Prichard, Alabama, at age 52 from liver cancer.
