= Jakell Mitchell =

American football player (1996–2014)

Profile
- Position: Tight end/Halfback

Personal information
- Born: January 1, 1996; Lee County, Alabama
- Died: December 14, 2014 (aged 18); Auburn, Alabama
- Listed height: 6 ft 4 in (1.93 m)
- Listed weight: 215 lb (98 kg)

Career information
- High school: Opelika (AL)
- College: Auburn University (2014)

Jakell Lenard Mitchell (January 1, 1996 – December 14, 2014) was an American college football player who was shot and killed during his freshman year at Auburn University. He was a heavily recruited three-sport athlete at Opelika High School in Opelika, Alabama.

== Parents ==
Jakell Mitchell was the son of Mario and Arlicia Mitchell. Like Jakell, Mario Mitchell played football at Opelika High School. By his senior season of 1991–92, Mario had become a top defensive line prospect. Following a recruiting visit by Larry Blakeney, head coach at Troy State University and former Auburn quarterback, Mario committed to Troy State and enrolled in the fall of 1992.

During his senior year, Mario led Troy State to its only undefeated regular season in school history, finishing 11–0. Weeks later during the ensuing Christmas break, just prior to his final semester of college, Mario and Arlicia gave birth to their third son Jamius on November 11, 2001, in Opelika. The Mitchell family settled in Opelika, where Mario owns several small businesses. Mario died on September 29, 2021, after years of depression following the death of his son.

== Early life ==
Like his father, Mitchell developed a tremendous aptitude for athletics. He grew up an Auburn fan, playing football in Opelika at the age of seven, joining his father's Little League baseball team as a youngster, and participating on the football, basketball and track and field squads at Opelika Middle School. "He always demanded that I be the hardest worker on the field and a leader for the other players" said Mitchell, thanking his father for his upbringing. He threw shot put, discus, and javelin in middle school, winning the East Alabama JV Championship in discus with a throw of 127’ 2". At some point in the 8th grade Mitchell decided he wanted to play collegiate football as a defensive end.

== High school ==
Mitchell entered Opelika High School as a freshman in the fall of 2010 where his brother, senior Jamario, was a basketball player. Ranked among the top players in Alabama, Jamario as a junior had led the team to its best season in school history with a record of 28–7, a No. 17 ranking, and a trip to the AHSAA Elite 8.

Mitchell played football under Brian Blackmon, head coach for one season prior to Mitchell's arrival. While serving as assistant coach for the team, Blackmon had received a master's degree from nearby Auburn University and had been named 2004 Alabama High School Assistant Coach of the Year by the Nike Coach of the Year Clinic. Blackmon attended Troy State from 1993 to 1996 at the same time as Mario Mitchell, but a back injury ended his football career and he never played on the same team as Mitchell. However, they were acquainted in high school as Blackmon's Robert E. Lee High School played Mitchell's Opelika High School.

During his junior season playing tight end and defensive end, Mitchell rushed for 392 yards and 17 touchdowns and had 403 receiving yards leading his school to its first AHSAA Class 6A state championship game. Coach Blackmon commented "Jakell’s a very good leader, a very driven young man. He does what he needs to do in the classroom, does what he needs to do in the weight room and on the practice field." Of Mitchell's father, Blackmon stated "He’s always been very involved in his son’s life and he’s kept him on the right path."

Following the football season, Mitchell led the basketball team to a No. 15 ranking in Class 6A, breaking the record set by his older brother's team as the highest ranked finish in school history. Mitchell was also a talented member of the track team as he had been in middle school. He had continued throwing javelin as a freshman and discus until his junior year, but he truly excelled at long jump. On April 26, 2013, the junior set his personal best on a leap of 21’ 9.5" at the AHSAA Class 6A Sectional meet at Smiths Station High School, enough to qualify him for the state championship.

Mitchell missed his senior season of high school sports with a knee injury. He graduated from Opelika High School on May 20, 2014, in a ceremony held on the school's football field in Bulldog Stadium. Mitchell aspired to become an FBI agent after graduating from college.

== Recruitment ==
As a junior, Mitchell was ranked one of the top ten tight ends in the country by PrepStar, the 17th best at his position by 247Sports. He received offers from the nation's top three Division I college football teams; No. 1 Florida State, No. 2 Auburn and No. 3 Michigan State. Mitchell also received offers from No. 7 Alabama, No. 14 LSU, No. 22 Wisconsin, No. 23 Duke and No. 24 Vanderbilt. He received additional offers from SEC schools Florida, Kentucky and Mississippi State as well as five other programs, North Carolina, Tulane, Rice, UCLA and his father's alma mater Troy.

On January 22, 2013, Auburn became the first college team to make Mitchell an offer. Eight days later, Auburn's cornerback coach Melvin Smith became the first to pay Mitchell an official visit. Mitchell, in turn, made his first unofficial visit to Auburn on February 3 and visited Florida two weeks later. That spring, Mitchell was invited among top high school prospects from the states of Alabama, Mississippi, Tennessee, Georgia and Florida to participate in the seventh Rivals Camp Series Presented by Under Armour held at Hoover High School outside of Birmingham. In an April 6, 2013, interview with rivals.com at the camp, Mitchell stated that he preferred playing for an SEC school and listed Auburn and Florida respectively as his top two choices, adding Florida State of the ACC as his third choice, promising to make a decision by the summer.

Mitchell was recruited by Auburn offensive coordinator Rhett Lashlee and tight ends coach Scott Fountain, considering Mitchell their top recruit for the H-back position. He formally announced his commitment to Auburn on May 25, 2013, the first attendee of Auburn's fifth annual Big Cat Weekend recruiting camp to commit and the eighth overall Auburn commitment for the class of 2014. Fountain commented, "He’s a fantastic athlete that is going to be able to do a lot for us." Auburn head coach Gus Malzahn said, "He’s a guy we identified when he was a junior. He can block, he can catch, he’s got a little bit of running back skills. We feel the sky is the limit for this guy."

Mitchell was one of three Opelika High School alumni on Auburn's roster that fall, the other two being running back Corey Grant who graduated while Mitchell was in middle school, and Mitchell's high school teammate Stephen Roberts who would serve as a backup safety.

After his recruitment and before his senior season of football began, on June 28, 2013, Mitchell tore his right ACL during a 7-on-7 football camp. He had surgery on July 9, 2013. Karlous Cox, a friend of Mitchell since first grade, played in Mitchell's place during Opelika's football season as the team finished with a 7–3 record and were eliminated in the first round of the playoffs 21–20 by McGill-Toolen Catholic.

Following his surgery, Mitchell made his first of five unofficial Auburn visits during their national championship runner-up season on August 31, 2013, as the Tigers defeated Washington State 31–24. The last of those five visits came on November 30, 2013, as Mitchell witnessed the Kick Six game between Auburn and Alabama. Mitchell signed an official letter of intent on February 5, 2014, and enrolled at Auburn on May 27.

During Auburn's preseason workouts that fall, Mitchell caught a 70-yard touchdown pass in the final scrimmage, the longest of the day. The decision was made to redshirt Mitchell while he gained weight and trained to fill the tight end role played by Auburn's All-SEC senior C. J. Uzomah. Mitchell selected Pre-Liberal Arts as his major.

== Death ==
In the early morning hours of Sunday, December 14, 2014, shortly after midnight, Mitchell was attending an off-campus party at the Tiger Lodge apartment complex at 202 West Longleaf Drive in Auburn, Alabama. The property featured two gates at the main entrance accessible by passcode but was not guarded. According to Mitchell's girlfriend Ayanna Hughuley, he became engaged in a verbal altercation with Tyrone Rowe in the parking lot, allegedly regarding Rowe liking an Instagram photo of Mitchell's girlfriend nearly a year earlier, when Rowe's cousin pulled a handgun and opened fire, striking Mitchell in the chest. She described Mitchell falling to the ground and struggling to get up to run away before falling again, the gunman firing several additional shots as Mitchell laid on the ground. Mitchell also had a gun, a 45-caliber Glock, which he used to return fire in self -defense based on later testimony.

Witnesses reported hearing six to eight gunshots, bullets striking at least three vehicles and the wall of an adjacent residence as up to 100 partygoers scattered. An officer with the Auburn Police Department patrolling West Longleaf Drive quickly arrived on scene. He discovered Mitchell with multiple gunshot wounds to the chest inside a vehicle departing the complex, presumably transporting him to the hospital, and was able to have Mitchell transferred to an ambulance shortly thereafter.

A 911 caller reported the shooting around 12:25 a.m. Mitchell was pronounced dead not long after arriving at East Alabama Medical Center in Opelika. His high school coach Brian Blackmon was notified by 2:30 a.m. that morning and visited Jakell's mother Arlicia.

At daybreak Mitchell's red Dodge Challenger, with vanity plate "Jakell", was towed from the scene. Before leaving for college, Mitchell's father had cautioned him to stay away from the negative influences of his hometown Opelika, but believed he would be safe inside the Auburn "bubble" within East University Drive that loops around the campus. From 2000 to 2012, Auburn had averaged a mere 2.2 homicides per year, so cases of murder were indeed a rarity.

The shooting was not the first involving the Auburn football team to occur at this location. The apartment complex was formerly known as University Heights, renamed the Tiger Lodge following a triple homicide on June 9, 2012, that took the lives of former Auburn players Ed Christian and Ladarious Phillips and injured active player Eric Mack. It was also not the first violent crime to occur in the area in recent days. An anonymous female reported that two days prior to Mitchell's death, two men broke into her apartment in an adjacent unit, holding a gun to her head and claiming exclusive rights to drug deals on that block.

== Suspect arrested ==
At 10:45 a.m., ten hours after the murder, Tyrone Rowe's cousin 22-year-old Markale Deandre Hart of Camp Hill, Alabama, was arrested 25 miles north of Auburn in Dadeville, Alabama, with Auburn detectives working in coordination with the Tallapoosa County Sheriff Department and Jackson's Gap Police. Hart, a father of two infants, was charged with murder and held in the Lee County Detention Center in Opelika on $150,000 bond, an amount was later increased to $500,000.

After the Hart family received death threats, they requested a reduction in bail so Hart could be moved to a jail in Tallapoosa County for safety reasons. He was transferred to Tallapoosa County Jail a few weeks later after his family posted a $500,000 property bond.

His criminal record dated back to the age of 18 when he faced felony first-degree burglary and theft charges in 2010. On December 15, 2011, Hart was found to be in possession of marijuana and drug paraphernalia and was again arrested, sentenced to two years of probation. In May 2012, Hart pleaded guilty to second-degree burglary as part of a plea deal and was ordered to serve six months of a six-year prison sentence with three years of probation which was active at the time of Jakell Mitchell's murder.

== Funeral and reaction ==
A public viewing was held on Friday, December 19, 2014, from 2:00 p.m. to 7:00 p.m. at Harris Funeral Home in Opelika. Mitchell's funeral was held the following day at noon at the Greater Peace Missionary Baptist Church in Opelika, just 1.2 miles from the football field where he played and graduated.

Mitchell was buried in Garden Hills Cemetery in Opelika. A number of Auburn freshman football players carried the casket including Markell Boston, Myron Burton, Deshaun Davis, Roc Thomas, Justin Thornton and Sean White while the entire Auburn team was in attendance.

Auburn coach Gus Malzahn commented "I’m devastated and saddened by the passing of Jakell Mitchell. My thoughts and prayers are with Jakell’s family and friends, who are suffering through this senseless tragedy." Opelika coach Brian Blackmon tweeted: "The sadness I feel right now is overwhelming. My hope is in Jesus. My prayers are that Mitchell family will find Peace in Him also." Even Auburn's bitter rival Alabama expressed condolences, coach Nick Saban stating "We feel horrible bad for Jakell Mitchell’s family. Fine young man that we recruited here." Former Alabama player C. J. Mosley, a Baltimore Raven at the time, voiced his sympathies over Twitter with the tweet "rip Jakell Mitchell and praying for the #AuburnFamily."

== Aftermath ==
Many Tiger Lodge tenants, some unaware of the 2012 shooting, were so infuriated by the violence they asked to have their leases terminated without penalty. Dozens voiced their distress on Facebook. A 90-minute meeting with residents and ownership the day after Mitchell's murder, which included parents of Tiger Lodge's student residents, was held in the property's clubhouse and became heated at times. Hart's gun was never found at the crime scene, while Mitchell's gun was found several feet away from his body.

Asset Campus Housing, owners of the property billing themselves as "the largest privately owned student housing companies (sic) in the nation," referred all media questions to the PR firm Threshold Agency. Spokesman Mark Evans commented "These kind of events happen sometimes and they would happen no matter where you are. We’re working with residents to take precautions to prevent these type of tragedies from occurring." Lee County District Attorney Robert Treese sought to have Tiger Lodge declared a public nuisance.

Mitchell's high school friend Adrianna Tapscott organized a candlelight vigil on Facebook to be held Monday, December 15, in front of the Lee County Courthouse, a gathering that grew into hundreds of mourners. On January 1, 2015, on what would have been Mitchell's 19th birthday, Auburn's football team played in the 2015 Outback Bowl and honored his memory by wearing No. 31 stickers on the right side of each helmet.

== Trial ==
In October 2015, Markale Hart was indicted for murder by a Lee County grand jury. He pleaded not guilty in November 2015. The trial was set to begin in late 2016, but had to be postponed after witness Tyrone Rowe was deployed to Kuwait with the Alabama National Guard.

The trial was rescheduled for June 12, 2017, and Hart was released on bail. On February 26, 2017, around 6:00 p.m., less than four months before the murder trial was scheduled to begin, Hart was arrested in Dadeville for DUI at twice the legal limit, possessing a 9 mm semi-automatic pistol, and receiving stolen property. When the postponed trial got underway in December 2017, the case against Hart was declared a mistrial after four days of deliberation as the jury was deadlocked.

On February 9, 2018, Hart pleaded guilty to manslaughter in the Mitchell case to avoid a retrial, a deal that dropped all 2017 charges and gave him credit for time served in the homicide case. Hart was released from jail and given three years probation.

== See also ==
- List of gridiron football players who died during their careers
