= Jacoby Glenn =

American football player (born 1993)

No. 39
- Position: Cornerback

Personal information
- Born: August 4, 1993 (age 33); Prichard, Alabama, U.S.
- Listed height: 6 ft 0 in (1.83 m)
- Listed weight: 180 lb (82 kg)

Career information
- High school: Vigor (Prichard)
- College: UCF
- NFL draft: 2015: undrafted

Career history
- Chicago Bears (2015–2016); Kansas City Chiefs (2017)

Awards and highlights
- AAC Fifth Anniversary Team (2018); AAC Co-Defensive Player of the Year (2014); Second-team All-American (2014); Freshman All-American (2013)

Career NFL statistics
- Total tackles: 26
- Fumble recoveries: 1
- Pass deflections: 6
- Interceptions: 1
- Stats at Pro Football Reference

Jacoby Glenn (born August 4, 1993) is an American former professional football player who was a cornerback in the National Football League (NFL). He played college football for the UCF Knights. He was signed by the Chicago Bears as an undrafted free agent in 2015.

== Early life ==
Glenn attended Vigor High School in Prichard, Alabama. He was rated by Rivals.com as a three-star recruit. He originally committed to the University of Kentucky to play college football but changed to the University of Central Florida (UCF).

== College career ==
After redshirting his freshman season in 2012, Glenn started 12 games as a redshirt freshman in 2013, missing one due to injury. He had 52 tackles, two interceptions, and two sacks. As a redshirt sophomore in 2014, Glenn started all 13 games, recording 48 tackles and seven interceptions. He was named the American Athletic Conference's co-Defensive Player of the Year and was also a second-team All-American.

Although he initially intended to stay for his junior season, Glenn entered the 2015 NFL draft.

== Professional career ==
=== Chicago Bears ===
After going undrafted in the 2015 NFL draft, Glenn signed with the Chicago Bears on May 3, 2015. After being waived on September 5, he was re-signed to their practice squad. On November 17, Glenn was elevated to the team's active roster.

On October 2, 2016, Glenn recorded his first interception of his career against Matthew Stafford and the Detroit Lions. On October 25, Glenn was released by the Bears and was re-signed to the practice squad the next day. He signed a reserve/future contract with the Bears on January 3, 2017. On May 1, Glenn was waived by the Bears.

=== Kansas City Chiefs ===
On August 5, 2017, Glenn signed with the Kansas City Chiefs. He was waived/injured on September 2, and placed on injured reserve. Glenn was released by the Chiefs on October 18.
