= Lil Greenwood =

Lil Greenwood (born Lillian Belle George, November 18, 1923 – July 19, 2011) was an American jazz and R&B singer and songwriter.

== Biography ==
Greenwood was born in Prichard, Alabama, where her father was a Baptist minister, and attended Alabama State College. In 1948, when her husband was in the military, she gave up her teaching career and moved to San Francisco. She sang at the Purple Onion club, and between 1950 and 1953 sang with Roy Milton and his Solid Senders. She also recorded under her own name for the Modern and Federal labels. Greenwood sang with Roy Milton at the 6th annual Cavalcade of Jazz held at Wrigley Field in Los Angeles on June 25, 1950, along with Lionel Hampton, Dinah Washington, Pee Wee Crayton, Big Jay McNeely and Tiny Davis and her Hell Divers.

In 1956, she was recruited by Duke Ellington to sing as a soloist with his orchestra, and recorded and toured extensively with Ellington over the next six years. After leaving Ellington, she recorded singles for a number of small record labels. In the 1970s, she guest starred in the television series Good Times and The Jeffersons. Greenwood recorded the CD “Back to My Roots” with David Amram in 2007.

She suffered a stroke in 2010, leaving her unable to perform, and died in her hometown of Prichard on July 19, 2011. She was buried in the Catholic Cemetery of Mobile, Alabama.
