= Willie Anderson (offensive tackle) =

American football player (born 1975)

No. 71, 79
- Position: Offensive tackle

Personal information
- Born: July 11, 1975 (age 51); Mobile, Alabama, U.S.
- Listed height: 6 ft 5 in (1.96 m)
- Listed weight: 340 lb (154 kg)

Career information
- High school: Vigor (Prichard, Alabama)
- College: Auburn (1993–1995)
- NFL draft: 1996: 1st round, 10th overall pick

Career history
- Cincinnati Bengals (1996–2007); Baltimore Ravens (2008)

Awards and highlights
- 3× First-team All-Pro (2004–2006); Second-team All-Pro (2003); 4× Pro Bowl (2003–2006); PFWA NFL All-Rookie Team (1996); Cincinnati Bengals Ring of Honor; Cincinnati Bengals 40th Anniversary Team; Cincinnati Bengals 50th Anniversary Team; Second-team All-American (1995); 2× First-team All-SEC (1994, 1995)

Career NFL statistics
- Games played: 195
- Games started: 184
- Fumble recoveries: 4
- Stats at Pro Football Reference

Willie Aaron Anderson (born July 11, 1975) is an American former professional football player who was an offensive tackle for the Cincinnati Bengals and Baltimore Ravens of the National Football League (NFL). He played college football for the Auburn Tigers and was selected by the Bengals 10th overall of the 1996 NFL draft. A four-time Pro Bowler and three-time first-team All-Pro selection, Anderson played his first 12 seasons with the Bengals.

The 11 quarterback pressures Anderson allowed in 2006 were the fourth-fewest pressures allowed by an offensive tackle in a season between 2006 and 2019. He was the first right tackle to be named a first-team All-Pro in three straight seasons since Dan Dierdorf, Ron Yary, and Rayfield Wright all did it in the 1970s, and the first right tackle to be named to the Pro Bowl in four straight seasons since Jackie Slater; no right tackle has accomplished those feats since Anderson.

In 2021, Willie Anderson was inducted into the Alabama Sports Hall of Fame.

That following year, he became a member of the Ring of Honor induction class of 2022 for the Bengals, joining Paul Brown, Anthony Muñoz, Ken Anderson, and Ken Riley.

Willie Anderson is the current host of the "Everything Big Willie Show" on YouTube where he tells his NFL Stories along with his guests. Recent guests include Eagles RT Lane Johnson, T.J. Houshmandzadeh, Corey Dillon, Andrew Whitworth, Amarius Mims, and many more.

He trains offensive linemen from high school to the NFL at the Willie Anderson Lineman Academy.

== College career ==
Anderson attended Auburn University, where he played for the Auburn Tigers football team from 1993 to 1995. He majored in marketing education.

Anderson started as a freshman at guard during the Tigers undefeated season in 1993. He switched to offensive tackle the next year.

He was honored as a 2nd-Team All-American after his Junior year at Auburn.

== Professional career ==
Pre-draft measurables
Height	Weight	Arm length	Hand span	40-yard dash	10-yard split	20-yard split	Vertical jump	Broad jump	Bench press
6 ft 5 in (1.96 m)	324 lb (147 kg)	35 1/8 in (0.89 m)	11 1/4 in (0.29 m)	5.28 s	1.88 s	3.09 s	23.0 in (0.58 m)	8 ft 1 in (2.46 m)	20 reps
All values from NFL Combine

=== Cincinnati Bengals ===
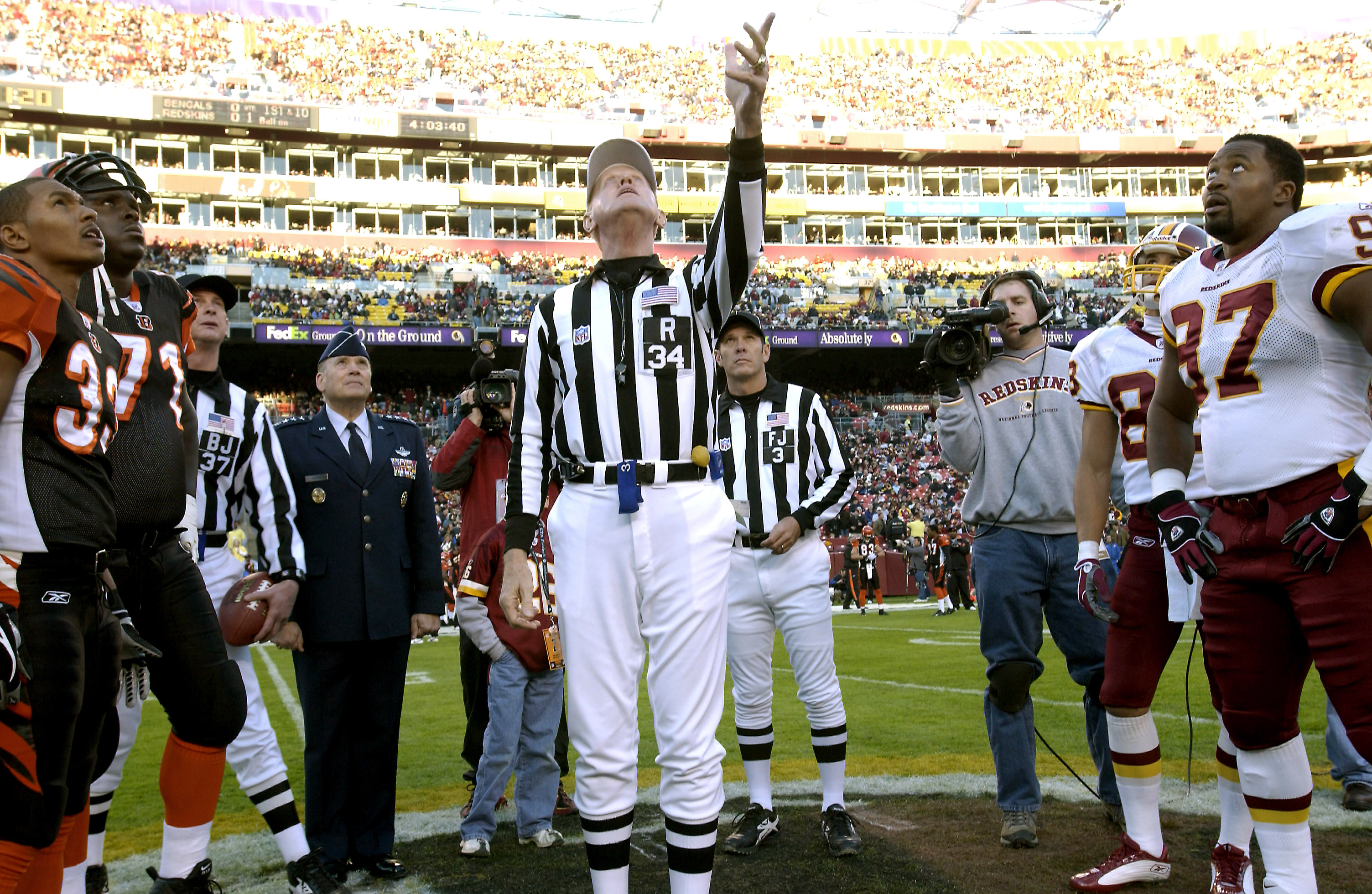
Anderson (second to left) observes a coin toss during a 2004 game against the Washington Redskins.

Anderson was selected by the Cincinnati Bengals in the first round (10th overall) of the 1996 NFL draft. He made Dr. Z's Sports Illustrated All-Pro team in 1999 and was a first alternate to the Pro Bowl in the 2001 and 2002 seasons. He was selected to represent the AFC in the 2003, 2004, 2005, and 2006 Pro Bowl.

Anderson was a road-grading run blocker, helping Corey Dillon break two NFL rushing records: Jim Brown’s rookie single-game rushing record and Walter Payton’s single-game rushing record of 275 yards. He also helped Rudi Johnson break the Bengals single-season rushing record that still stands today. He started 116 consecutive games in a row from 1999 to 2007.

In his rookie season, it was said that he was able to bench press 675 pounds. Anderson received a five-year, $30 million contract extension after the 1999 season, his fourth season. He also received a five-year, $32 million contract extension, with $20 million guaranteed, prior to the 2006 season, his eleventh season with the Bengals. Anderson was cut by the Bengals on August 30, 2008, after he refused to take a pay cut.

In 2017, Anderson was named by the Bengals as one of their top 50 players to celebrate their 50th season.

=== Baltimore Ravens ===
On September 4, 2008, Anderson signed a three-year, $11 million deal with the Baltimore Ravens. Anderson started 10 games for the Ravens, helping them reach the AFC Championship Game in coach John Harbaugh’s first season.

On May 13, 2009, the Ravens placed him on the reserved-retired list. The Ravens asked Anderson to reconsider his retirement, but he retired after the 2008 season.

=== Hall of Fame candidacy ===
In 2025, Anderson made it to the final seven in Hall of Fame voting. However, he was not ultimately elected.

== Personal life ==
Anderson's son, Jair Hawkins-Anderson, played college football for the Georgia Tech Yellow Jackets.
