= Deshaun Davis =

American gridiron football player (born 1995)

Jacksonville State Gamecocks
- Title: Linebackers coach

Personal information
- Born: December 31, 1995 (age 30); Prichard, Alabama, U.S.
- Listed height: 5 ft 11 in (1.80 m)
- Listed weight: 230 lb (104 kg)

Career information
- High school: Vigor (Prichard)
- College: Auburn (2014–2018)
- NFL draft: 2019: 6th round, 210th overall pick

Career history

Playing
- Cincinnati Bengals (2019)*; Jacksonville Jaguars (2019)*; Philadelphia Eagles (2019)*; Saskatchewan Roughriders (2020–2021)*
- * Offseason or practice squad member only

Coaching
- UCF (2022) Graduate assistant; North Alabama (2023–2024) Linebackers coach; Jacksonville State (2025–present) Linebackers coach

Awards and highlights
- First-team All-SEC (2018)
- Stats at Pro Football Reference
- Stats at CFL.ca

Deshaun Davis (born December 31, 1995) is an American football coach and former player. He is currently the linebackers coach at Jacksonville State University. Davis played college football at Auburn as an inside linebacker.

== Early life ==
Davis was all-state at Vigor High School his sophomore and junior seasons. A torn ACL ended Davis' senior year. He committed to Auburn on April 17, 2013, choosing the Tigers over Clemson, Florida State, LSU and Kentucky. In addition to football, Davis played basketball and baseball at Vigor.

== College career ==
At Auburn, Davis redshirted his true freshman year and did not make the starting lineup until his redshirt sophomore season. During his redshirt freshman season, then-defensive coordinator Will Muschamp told Davis to expect no playing time, leaving the player to consider a transfer. Davis started occasionally taking over playcalling duties from defensive coordinator Kevin Steele. During his senior season, Davis led the team in tackles and was named first-team all-Southeastern Conference. An ankle tweak against Mississippi State threatened to derail his season, but Davis did not miss any games as a result of that injury. After his senior season, Davis participated in the Senior Bowl.

== Professional career ==
Pre-draft measurables
Height	Weight	Arm length	Hand span	20-yard shuttle	Vertical jump	Broad jump	Bench press
5 ft 11 3/8 in (1.81 m)	234 lb (106 kg)	31 1/4 in (0.79 m)	10 in (0.25 m)	4.38 s	31.0 in (0.79 m)	9 ft 3 in (2.82 m)	25 reps
All values from NFL Combine

=== Cincinnati Bengals ===
Davis was selected by the Cincinnati Bengals in the sixth round (210th overall) of the 2019 NFL draft. After recording fifteen tackles in the preseason, he was waived during final roster cuts on August 31, 2019.

=== Jacksonville Jaguars ===
On September 2, 2019, Davis was signed to the practice squad of the Jacksonville Jaguars, but was released two days later.

=== Philadelphia Eagles ===
On December 18, 2019, Davis was signed to the Philadelphia Eagles' practice squad. He was released on January 1, 2020.

=== Saskatchewan Roughriders ===
Davis signed with the Saskatchewan Roughriders of the Canadian Football League on May 6, 2020. After the CFL canceled the 2020 season due to the COVID-19 pandemic, Davis chose to opt-out of his contract with the Roughriders on August 27, 2020. Davis was selected by the Conquerors of The Spring League during its player selection draft on October 12, 2020, and opted back in to his contract with the Roughriders on January 4, 2021.

== Coaching career ==
Davis started his coaching career as a graduate assistant at the University of Central Florida in 2022. On December 7, 2022, he was announced as the first member of Brent Dearmon's staff coaching linebackers at North Alabama.

== Personal life ==
Davis is a Christian.
