= Xavier Dampeer =

American football player (born 1994)

No. 52
- Positions: Guard; Center

Personal information
- Born: May 29, 1994 (age 32); Mendenhall, Mississippi, U.S.
- Listed height: 6 ft 3 in (1.91 m)
- Listed weight: 300 lb (136 kg)

Career information
- High school: Mendenhall
- College: Copiah–Lincoln CC (2012–2013); Auburn (2014–2016)
- NFL draft: 2017: undrafted

Career history
- Green Bay Blizzard (2018); Fan Controlled Football (2021); Pittsburgh Maulers (2022–2023)

Xavier Dampeer (born May 29, 1994) is an American former football guard and center who played college football for Auburn.

== Early life ==
Dampeer attended high school at Mendenhall High School. In addition to playing football, he competed also in shot put, where he placed sixth in the state championship, was a powerlifter, and played on the soccer team where he lettered. He was selected MACJC most valuable offensive lineman and selected for the MACJC all-star game.

== College ==
After high school, he went to junior college and played for Copiah–Lincoln Community College for two seasons. Coming out of JUCO, he was the first overall rated center in JUCO and had offers from Western Kentucky, UAB, Troy and Auburn. He committed to play for the Auburn Tigers.

In his first season, he played five games as a center. In 2015, he missed a large part of the season due to an injury sustained from getting hit by Duke Williams. He redshirted that season for medical reasons. In 2016, he became the starting center, playing four games before getting injured. He played two other games at the end of the season.

== Professional career ==
Dampeer went undrafted in the 2017 NFL draft. He played for the Green Bay Blizzard in the 2018 Indoor Football League season. Afterwards he also played in Your Call Football and The Spring League. In 2021, he signed with the Fan Controlled Football competition where he played in the 2021 season. In May 2022, he signed with the Pittsburgh Maulers of the United States Football League. He also played in the 2023 season for the Maulers. He re-signed for the 2024 season but the club was folded just a month later in December 2023 after the USFL and XFL merger.
