= Vigor High School =

C. F. Vigor High School

Location
- 913 North Wilson Avenue; Prichard, Alabama 36610; United States; 30°44′36.24″N 88°4′51″W

Information
- Type: Public high school
- Motto: The School That Spirit Built
- Established: 1944 (82 years ago)
- CEEB code: 012235
- Principal: Gerald Cunningham
- Teaching staff: 38.00 (on an FTE basis)
- Grades: 9–12
- Enrollment: 607 (2023–2024)
- Student to teacher ratio: 15.97
- Campus type: Urban
- Colors: Green and white
- Mascot: Wolves
- Yearbook: Vigorama
- Website: www.vigorhighschool.com

Vigor High School, located in Prichard, Alabama, is a public high school that educates grades 9-12. It is operated by the Mobile County Public School System.

It serves most of Prichard.

== Naming ==
The school is named after Charles Frederick Vigor (1874–1941), who was an Assistant Superintendent of Mobile County, Alabama Public Schools for more than 30 years, serving from 1910 to November 3, 1941, and was mainly in charge of rural schools in the system. He was a lifetime resident of Mobile, having graduated from Barton Academy, and was the first president of the Mobile Education Association.

== Dress code ==
The Mobile County Public School System requires all schools to have a school uniform policy. Shirts allowed include tennis shirts or oxford shirts in hunter green for freshman, sophomores, and juniors; and grey for seniors. Pants must be khaki, and the material must be cotton twill. Students are allowed to wear tennis shoes of any color. Open-toed shoes are not allowed.

== Notable alumni ==
- Willie Anderson – NFL offensive tackle, 4x Pro Bowl selection
- Robert Brazile – NFL linebacker, 7x Pro Bowl selection, member of the Pro Football Hall of Fame
- Paul Crane – former NFL center, Super Bowl III champion with the New York Jets
- Deshaun Davis – American football coach and former player
- Quinterrius Eatmon – professional football offensive tackle
- Jalston Fowler – former NFL fullback
- Jacoby Glenn – former NFL cornerback
- Pat Howell – former MLB center fielder
- Scott Hunter – NFL quarterback
- Ellis Lankster – former NFL cornerback
- Kevin Lee – former NFL wide receiver
- Sen'Derrick Marks – NFL defensive tackle
- Darius Philon – former NFL defensive tackle
- Donald Reese – former NFL defensive end
- Terrance Simmons – former NFL defensive tackle
- David Windham – former NFL linebacker, Super Bowl XXII champion with the Washington Redskins
- Rickey Young – former NFL running back, 1978 NFL receptions leader
