= Prichard, Alabama =

City in Alabama, United States

- City
- Flag Seal
- Nicknames: "The City of Champions", "The Crossroads of Mobile County"
- Location in Mobile County, Alabama
- Coordinates: 30°45′30″N 88°07′34″W
- Country: United States
- State: Alabama
- County: Mobile
- Incorporated: September 16, 1925
  - Mayor: (D)

Area
  - Total: 25.510 sq mi (66.071 km^{2})
  - Land: 25.306 sq mi (65.542 km^{2})
  - Water: 0.204 sq mi (0.528 km^{2})
- Elevation: 46 ft (14 m)

Population (2020)
  - Total: 19,322
  - Estimate (2023): 18,816
  - Density: 743.6/sq mi (287.11/km^{2})
- Time zone: UTC−6 (Central (CST))
  - Summer (DST): UTC−5 (CDT)
- ZIP Codes: 36610, 36613, 36617
- Area code: 251
- FIPS code: 01-62496
- GNIS feature ID: 2404573
- Sales tax: 10.0%
- Website: thecityofprichard.org

Prichard is a city in Mobile County, Alabama, United States. The population was 19,322 at the 2020 census, and was estimated to be 18,816 in 2023. Prichard borders the north side of Mobile, as well as the Mobile suburbs of Chickasaw, Saraland, and the unincorporated sections of Eight Mile.

== History ==
Prichard began as a settlement in the 1830s, bordering Telegraph Road, known now as U.S. Highway 43. It was named for Cleveland Mason Prichard (1840-1899), who purchased a tract of land (1879) on the east side of the Gulf, Mobile and Ohio [GM&O] Railroad track and developed it into a vegetable-shipping point for markets in the North and East. This business model was copied by entrepreneurs throughout Florida, Texas and other states.

Newspapers of the time referred to Cleveland Prichard as "The Vegetable King." Cleveland's brother, Hardy, worked with him in this enterprise. He also built the Prichard Horse Race Course, which flourished briefly as a winter training ground for thoroughbred race horses. He ran a livery stable in downtown Mobile, Alabama on the corner of Royal and State Streets.

Prichard remained largely unsettled until after the American Civil War. The Clotilda, an illegal slave ship, had arrived at Mobile Bay in July 1860 carrying 110 Africans purchased in Ouidah, Kingdom of Dahomey, on behalf of Mobile shipbuilders and merchants. It was towed into the delta north of the city, burned, and sunk to escape capture. The Africans were taken upriver by a steamboat and landed near Magazine Point. They were distributed among the investors in the voyage.

After the war, some 32 of the Africans returned there, developing Africatown as their own community. The Plateau/Magazine area was developed along Telegraph Road. Eventually, Plateau and Magazine had their territory split between Mobile and Prichard. The Africatown Historic District, considered part of Mobile, was added to the National Register of Historic Places in 2012.

=== 20th century ===
After 1900, Prichard began a slow, steady development. Major industries related to shipbuilding and paper mills began to develop along the waterfront, and some workers settled in Prichard.

Social tensions were high in the postwar period as veterans returned and struggled to get jobs. The summer of 1919 became known as Red Summer because of the numerous racial riots that took place in industrial cities across the country, including Chicago, Omaha, Baltimore, and Washington, DC. On June 6, 1919, James Lewis was lynched in Prichard.

Prichard was incorporated on September 16, 1925. During World War II, the defense industry and shipbuilding expanded in Mobile, and Prichard became a company town. Many Mobile shipbuilding companies built homes for their workers in Prichard. The 1940s and 1950s saw phenomenal growth in the Mobile area, which accompanied expansion of the defense and shipbuilding industries during and after World War II. During the 1950s and 1960s, Prichard annexed historic Whistler as well as parts of Eight Mile and Kushla.

Mobile, Prichard and Chickasaw all recorded their highest city-proper populations in 1960. In the postwar period, federally subsidized highway construction made commuting from suburbs easier and encouraged suburban housing development across the country, including in the Mobile metropolitan area. Like other cities, Prichard began to see its middle-class residents move out to newer housing, because they could afford to do so. In addition, following the Civil Rights Movement and passage of civil rights laws in the mid-1960s, the state's rigid system of Jim Crow and racial segregation was overturned. Blacks who had previously been restricted to the Bullshead/Neely/Trinity Gardens area of Prichard began moving into downtown, or East Prichard.

These two elements began to result in a population decline in the city. In 1960, Prichard recorded a population of 47,371. By 1970, the population had decreased to 41,000 and by 1990, to approximately 34,000. This was also a period of decline in shipbuilding and related industries and, with the loss of jobs, workers moved elsewhere.

In 1970, Vigor High School on Wilson Avenue, which had been Prichard's white high school during segregation, was 70% white. By 1980, it was 80% black. Although most of Prichard's remaining majority-white areas were in this district, many families had put their students into parochial or private schools. Before being moved to its current location on Lott Road in Eight Mile, Blount High School was originally located on Main Street in Prichard. Blount High School was a predominantly African American high school, established in August 1956.

In 1972, the majority-white city of Prichard elected its first black mayor, Algernon Johnson (A.J.) Cooper. He served two terms as Prichard's mayor. Later he was appointed to the administration of President Bill Clinton. In 1968, Cooper had founded the Black American Law Students Association at New York University, where he earned his law degree. While Mayor Cooper was popular with both blacks and whites, he had numerous confrontations with the Prichard City Council during his tenure.

In 1994, construction of Interstate 165 was completed, and it produced some economic benefits in East Prichard. The 1980s downtown office vacancy rate was near 80%. As of 2000, it was closer to 30%.

In the 1980s and 1990s, the closing of factories operated by Scott Paper Company and International Paper caused a major loss of jobs, greatly adding to the city's problems. It struggled with poverty, unemployment, and associated crime and drug use. The loss of the paper companies and associated jobs devastated the area and the city struggled to recover. In 1999, the city declared bankruptcy.

In 2004, the Prichard Housing Authority began demolition of the Bessemer Avenue Housing Project in Bullshead. In November 2004, Mobile County voters narrowly (500 votes out of 100,000 cast on the issue) defeated a local amendment which would have allowed Prichard to set up a special trade zone. The measure passed by a two-thirds vote in Prichard, and passed by smaller margins in the cities of Mobile and Chickasaw, but was defeated by the rest of Mobile County.

From 2010 to 2012, the city was home to the Restoration Youth Academy, a so-called Christian camp that imposed anti-gay conversion therapy. It closed in 2012 due to unpaid rent.

The enterprise reopened in Mobile, as the Saving Youth Foundation and Solid Rock Ministries, and operated until being shut down in 2015. It was closed by officials after investigations of abuse of youths and discovery of appallingly harsh conditions at the camp. The three pastors who ran the place were prosecuted for child abuse. They were convicted and sentenced in February 2017 to 20 years in prison. The case generated national media attention.

== Geography ==
Prichard is located in central Mobile County. It is bordered to the south by Mobile, to the east by Chickasaw, and to the north and northeast by Saraland. U.S. Route 45 (St. Stephens Road) runs through Prichard southwest of the city center; it leads southeast 4 miles (6 km) to downtown Mobile and northwest 27 miles (43 km) to Citronelle. Interstate 65 and its spur I-165 meet in Prichard. I-165 leads southeast to downtown Mobile, while I-65 leads south to Interstate 10 in southwest Mobile. To the northeast I-65 leads 164 miles (264 km) to Montgomery, the state capital.

According to the United States Census Bureau, the city of Prichard has a total area of 25.510 square miles (66.07 km^{2}), of which 25.306 square miles (65.54 km^{2}) are land and 0.204 square miles (0.53 km^{2}), or 0.80%, are water.

=== Neighborhoods ===
- Downtown
- East Prichard
- Whistler
- Eight Mile

== Demographics ==
Historical population
Census	Pop.	Note	%±
1930	4,580		—
1940	6,084		32.8%
1950	19,014		212.5%
1960	47,371		149.1%
1970	41,578		−12.2%
1980	39,541		−4.9%
1990	34,311		−13.2%
2000	28,633		−16.5%
2010	22,659		−20.9%
2020	19,322		−14.7%
2025 (est.)	18,825	▼	−2.6%
U.S. Decennial Census; 2020 Census

=== Racial and ethnic composition ===
Prichard, Alabama – racial and ethnic composition Note: the US Census treats Hispanic/Latino as an ethnic category. This table excludes Latinos from the racial categories and assigns them to a separate category. Hispanics/Latinos may be of any race.
Race / ethnicity (NH = non-Hispanic)	Pop. 2000	Pop. 2010	Pop. 2020	% 2000	% 2010	% 2020
White alone (NH)	4,038	2,803	2,266	14.10%	12.37%	11.72%
Black or African American alone (NH)	24,095	19,380	16,340	84.15%	85.53%	84.56%
Native American or Alaska Native alone (NH)	87	84	63	0.30%	0.37%	0.33%
Asian alone (NH)	33	16	35	0.12%	0.07%	0.18%
Native Hawaiian or Pacific Islander alone (NH)	2	0	3	0.01%	0.00%	0.02%
Other race alone (NH)	11	23	114	0.04%	0.10%	0.59%
Mixed race or Multiracial (NH)	205	183	501	0.72%	0.81%	2.59%
Hispanic or Latino (any race)	162	170	206	0.57%	0.75%	1.07%
Total	28,633	22,659	19,322	100.00%	100.00%	100.00%

=== 2020 census ===
In the 2020 census, there were 19,322 people, 7,458 households, and 4,779 families residing in the city. The population density was 763.5 inhabitants per square mile (294.8/km^{2}). There were 8,934 housing units at an average density of 353.0 per square mile (136.3/km^{2}).

The median age was 40.7 years. 24.0% of residents were under the age of 18 and 19.7% of residents were 65 years of age or older. For every 100 females there were 91.2 males, and for every 100 females age 18 and over there were 88.1 males age 18 and over.

89.4% of residents lived in urban areas, while 10.6% lived in rural areas.

Of the 7,458 households, 30.8% had children under the age of 18 living in them. Of all households, 23.4% were married-couple households, 22.2% were households with a male householder and no spouse or partner present, and 48.9% were households with a female householder and no spouse or partner present. About 31.9% of all households were made up of individuals and 14.8% had someone living alone who was 65 years of age or older.

Of the 8,934 housing units, 16.5% were vacant. The homeowner vacancy rate was 1.6% and the rental vacancy rate was 11.5%.

Racial composition in the 2020 census
Race	Number	Percent
White	2,266	11.7%
Black or African American	16,340	84.6%
American Indian and Alaska Native	63	0.3%
Asian	35	0.2%
Native Hawaiian and Other Pacific Islander	3	0.0%
Some other race	114	0.6%
Two or more races	501	2.6%
Hispanic or Latino (of any race)	206	1.1%

=== 2010 census ===
In the 2010 census, there were 22,659 people, 8,240 households, and 5,659 families residing in the city. The population density was 896.0 inhabitants per square mile (345.9/km^{2}). There were 9,891 housing units at an average density of 391.1 per square mile (151.0/km^{2}). The racial makeup of the city was 12.47% White, 85.80% African American, 0.38% Native American, 0.08% Asian, 0.004% Pacific Islander, 0.36% from some other races and 0.90% from two or more races. Hispanic or Latino people of any race were 0.75% of the population.

There were 8,240 households, out of which 35.9% had children under the age of 18 living with them, 32.8% were married couples living together, 33.8% had a female householder with no husband present, and 31.3% were non-families. 27.9% of all households were made up of individuals, and 4.2% had someone living alone who was 65 years of age or older. The average household size was 2.67 and the average family size was 3.27.

26.0% of the population were under the age of 18, 11.6% from 18 to 24, 21.6% from 25 to 44, 27.6% from 45 to 64, and 13.2% who were 65 years of age or older. The median age was 35.8 years. For every 100 females, there were 85.5 males. For every 100 females age 18 and over, there were 80.5 males.

The median income for a household in the city was $23,894, and the median income for a family was $29,100. Males had a median income of $29,664 versus $21,969 for females. The per capita income for the city was $13,137. About 28.7% of families and 33.7% of the population were below the poverty line, including 49.5% of those under age 18 and 22.6% of those age 65 or over.

=== American Community Survey ===
In the 2023 American Community Survey, there are 6,720 estimated households in Prichard with an average of 2.73 persons per household. The city has a median household income of $35,331. Approximately 32.1% of the city's population lives at or below the poverty line. Prichard has an estimated 46.0% employment rate, with 9.4% of the population holding a bachelor's degree or higher and 81.8% holding a high school diploma.

The top five reported ancestries, with people allowed to report up to two ancestries, thus the figures will generally add to more than 100%, were English (99.5%), Spanish (0.4%), Indo-European (0.0%), Asian and Pacific Islander (0.1%), and Other (0.0%).

== Government ==
The current mayor of Prichard is Carletta Davis. Davis was elected mayor in the 2025 municipal elections, defeating incumbent mayor Jimmie Gardner who was seeking a third term.

Davis is the first black female mayor of the city of Prichard.

The city has a five-member city council, which is composed of five districts of equal size. The city council is responsible for establishing the policies of the city of Prichard. The current council president is Earline Martin-Harris. The Prichard City Council meets every Thursday at 4:30 pm in the Council Chambers at Prichard City Hall.

=== City pensions controversy ===
In 2003, the city hired an actuary to analyze and summarize their employees’ pension plan. He warned the city that at the current rate of government spending the plan would run out of money by the summer of 2009. In September 2009, the city's pension fund ran out of money and stopped paying pensions. The city filed for bankruptcy again in October 2009.

In 2010, Councilwoman Earline Martin-Harris suggested dissolving the city and offered an alternative budget which would make all city employees part-time employees. In April 2011, pensioners had not received their pension checks nor had a budget been passed in eighteen months.

The dispute continued into 2013, as the city did not reach an agreement with soon-to-retire employees. In response to these developments, four of these employees requested that U.S. Bankruptcy Judge William Shulman dismiss the city's bankruptcy.

== Education ==
=== Primary and secondary schools ===
The Mobile County Public School System serves Prichard. Elementary schools in Prichard include Collins-Rhodes Elementary School, Grant Elementary School, Indian Springs Elementary School, Robbins Elementary School, and Whitley Elementary School.

Mobile County Training Middle School and Chastang Middle School serve sections of Prichard. Some area students attend North Mobile County Middle School.

Vigor High School is in Prichard. Blount High School is in an unincorporated area in Eight Mile, adjacent to Prichard, and serving a part of Prichard. Faulkner Vocational School, a magnet school, is in Prichard.

The current Collins Rhodes school opened in 2007, replacing Eight Mile Elementary School.

=== Colleges and universities ===
The University of Mobile, named for the county, not the city, is located in Prichard.

=== Public libraries ===
The city operates the Prichard Public Library and the Mitchell Public Library.

== Notable people ==
- Jimmie V. Adams, retired United States Air Force four-star general
- Willie Anderson, American professional football player Cincinnati Bengals
- Ethel Ayler, actress, The Cosby Show
- Robert Brazile, football Hall of Famer Houston Oilers
- Delores Brumfield, former member of the All-American Girls Professional Baseball League
- Derrick Burroughs, football player with the Buffalo Bills
- James "Thunderbird" Davis (1938 – 1992), Texas blues and electric blues guitarist and songwriter
- Jacoby Glenn, American football cornerback
- Lil Greenwood, jazz and R&B singer
- Jerry Lott, American rockabilly musician (1938-1983) born in Prichard
- Sherman Williams, football player with the Dallas Cowboys
- Kennedy Winston, professional basketball player
