= Herb Hand =

American football player and coach (born 1968)

Current position
- Title: Offensive line coach
- Team: Florida State
- Conference: ACC

Biographical details
- Born: January 5, 1968 (age 58); Westmoreland, New York

Playing career
- 1986–1989: Hamilton
- Position: Offensive lineman

Coaching career (HC unless noted)
- 1991–1993: West Virginia Wesleyan (GA)
- 1994–1996: Glenville State (DC)
- 1997–1998: Concord (DC/ST)
- 1999–2000: Clemson (GA)
- 2001–2006: West Virginia (TE/RC)
- 2007–2008: Tulsa (co-OC/OL)
- 2009: Tulsa (AHC/OC/OL)
- 2010–2012: Vanderbilt (OL)
- 2013: Vanderbilt (RGC/OL)
- 2014–2015: Penn State (RGC/OL)
- 2016–2017: Auburn (OL)
- 2018–2020: Texas (co-OC/OL)
- 2021–2024: UCF (OL)
- 2025–present: Florida State (OL)

Herb Hand (born January 5, 1968) is an American football coach who is currently the offensive line coach for the Florida State. Prior to that, he was the offensive line coach for UCF. Hand is a three-time finalist for Offensive Line Coach of the Year by Football Scoop (2008, 2016–17).

== Playing career ==
Hand was a three-year starter at Hamilton College, where he played offensive line. A team captain his senior season, Hand earned All-NESCAC honors in 1989. He graduated from Hamilton in 1990 with a degree in history.

== Coaching career ==
Hand began his coaching career at West Virginia Wesleyan College in 1991 as a defensive graduate assistant, spending three seasons in that role. He earned his MBA from West Virginia Wesleyan in 1993. Hand has also spent time as the defensive coordinator at Glenville State from 1994 to 1996 under Rich Rodriguez and at Concord College in Athens, West Virginia. While at Concord, he also served as the special teams coordinator. He joined the coaching staff at Clemson University in 1999 as an offensive graduate assistant, reuniting with Rodriguez who was Clemson's offensive coordinator and quarterbacks coach.

=== West Virginia ===
After Rodriguez was named the head coach at West Virginia, Hand joined his staff as tight ends coach and recruiting coordinator. Hand spent six years (2001–06) at West Virginia, serving as tight ends coach and recruiting coordinator. At West Virginia he helped them win three Big East Conference titles and go to five straight bowl games during the span, including a victory over SEC champion Georgia in the 2006 Sugar Bowl.

=== Tulsa ===
When Todd Graham accepted the head coaching position at the University of Tulsa in 2007, he hired Hand to be his co-offensive coordinator and offensive line coach, splitting coordinator duties with Gus Malzahn. After Malzahn left to be the offensive coordinator at Auburn in 2009, Hand was promoted to sole offensive coordinator, as well as assistant head coach.

=== Vanderbilt ===
Hand was named the offensive line coach at Vanderbilt University in 2010, joining Robbie Caldwell's staff. During his tenure at Vanderbilt, he coached players who earned 11 Southeastern Conference Offensive Lineman of the Week Awards. His units blocked for Zac Stacy who broke the Vanderbilt season and career (3,143 yards) rushing records at that time. After Caldwell resigned at the end of the 2010 season, Hand was retained by newly hired head coach James Franklin. Hand also added the title of run game coordinator to his duties at the beginning of the 2013 season.

=== Penn State ===
After Franklin accepted the head coaching job at Penn State University, Hand also joined his staff in the same position he held on Franklin's staff at Vanderbilt. He served as the offensive line coach and run game coordinator for two seasons. His unit blocked for Saquon Barkley in 2015, when he broke Penn State's freshman rushing record with 1,076 yards and was named the Big Ten Freshman of the Year.

=== Auburn ===
Hand was named the offensive line coach at Auburn, reuniting with Gus Malzahn, Hand's offensive line was named a semifinalists for the Joe Moore Award (nation's top offensive line) in 2016 and 2017. Under Hand, right guard Braden Smith earned first-team All-America honors from AP and also earned the SEC's Jacobs Blocking Trophy as the top blocker in the conference. In 2016, Kamryn Pettway led the SEC and ranked 11th in the nation in rushing yards per game, making him a Doak Walker Award semifinalist (top running back in college football). The line paved the way for running back Kerryon Johnson to earn 2017 SEC Offensive Player of the Year and All-American honors. In his two seasons at Auburn, they went back-to-back New Year's Six bowl games the Sugar Bowl and Peach Bowl.

=== Texas ===
Hand was named the co-offensive coordinator and offensive line coach at the University of Texas in 2018, joining Tom Herman's staff. Nine offensive linemen were named All-Big 12 during his three years at Texas under Hand. All five of the starting offensive linemen in 2018 were named to the All-Big 12 team, led by Calvin Anderson, Zach Shackelford, and Patrick Vahe. In 2020, Sam Cosmi was named an All-American and was later drafted 51st overall in 2021 NFL draft. He was not retained when Herman was fired and replaced by Steve Sarkisian at the end of the 2020 season.

=== UCF ===
Hand was hired to join the coaching staff at UCF, working again with coach Malzahn. He served as Offensive Line Coach in 2021. In April 2022, he was promoted to Co-Offensive Coordinator. Coach Hand was the only AAC line coach to have all five of his UCF starters earn some sort of postseason honors in both seasons recognized by Pro Football Focus in both 2021 and 2022. In 2022, UCF's o-line led the nation percentage of least blown block assignments on designed runs. UCF offensive tackle Tylan Grable was drafted in the 2024 NFL draft

== Personal life ==
A native of Westmoreland, New York, Hand and his wife Debbie have three children.

Hand suffered a subarachnoid hemorrhage in 2006 while recruiting in Orlando, Florida. Hand was able to avoid having surgery to repair the bleed, and was able to fly back to Morgantown a week later.

A self-proclaimed foodie, Hand appeared as a contestant on an episode of Chopped in 2014, making all the way into the entrée round before being eliminated. Hand has also stated on a Reddit AMA that he once cooked a meal for a recruit and was later able to get the recruit to commit.

Hand is a rapper, rapping at a Penn State Junior Elite football camp in 2014 to pump up the players, and rapping during a team meeting while at Texas in 2018.
