= Sean White (American football) =

American football player (born 1995)

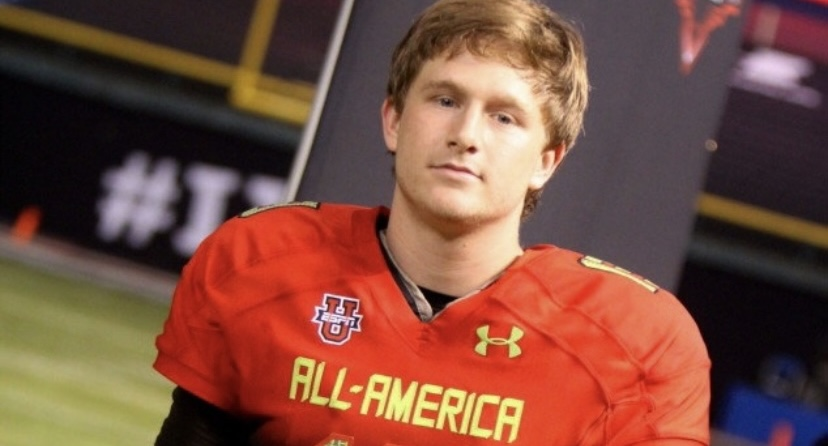

No. 13
- Position: Quarterback

Personal information
- Born: November 10, 1995 (age 30); Boca Raton, Florida, U.S.
- Listed height: 6 ft 1 in (1.85 m)
- Listed weight: 211 lb (96 kg)

Career information
- High school: Chaminade-Madonna (Hollywood, Florida); NSU University School (Fort Lauderdale, Florida)
- College: Auburn (2014−2017)
- Stats at ESPN

Sean Michael White (born November 10, 1995) is an American former college football player who was a quarterback for the Auburn Tigers. White ranks third in Auburn history for career passing efficiency and fourth in completion percentage.

== Early life ==
White attended high school at Chaminade-Madonna in Hollywood, Florida before transferring to University School for his senior year. He is one of Broward County’s all-time leading passers, throwing for over 8,400 yards and 117 TDs in his high school career. He was named 1st-Team All-Florida twice and 1st-Team All-Broward three times.

White won the Elite 11 Finals MVP award in 2013, competing against top high school quarterbacks such as Deshaun Watson, Will Grier, DeShone Kizer, and Kyle Allen. White also led The South Florida Express in 2013, a 7-on-7 team that has featured many of South Florida’s top prospects, including past quarterbacks Teddy Bridgewater and Geno Smith. After his senior season, White was named MVP of the 2014 Under Armour All-America Game completing 10/12 passes for 156 yards and a touchdown.

White was rated a 4-star recruit by Rivals.com and 247sports, noting strengths in intangibles, instincts, and arm talent, with weaknesses in physical size and speed. He committed to Auburn University to play college football.

== College career ==
White redshirted his first year at Auburn in 2014.

In 2015, White began the season as backup to Jeremy Johnson, but was named starter after three weeks. He made his first collegiate start against Mississippi State and Dak Prescott. White would start six games in 2015, becoming the first freshman in Auburn history to throw for 250+ yards in three consecutive games (Ole Miss, Kentucky, Arkansas), and the first Auburn QB to do so since Dameyune Craig in 1997. Injuries caused him to miss the final games of the regular season, including the Iron Bowl.

Before the 2016 season, White was publicly named the starter by Gus Malzahn after battling Johnson and JUCO transfer John Franklin III, but all three quarterbacks took meaningful snaps in the opener against Clemson. White would take control of the job a few weeks later in a home win over LSU.

After nine weeks, White held the highest passer rating in the SEC, helping lead Auburn to a six game winning streak and inside the Top 10. During the streak, White suffered a right shoulder injury in a 40–29 road win over Ole Miss, and was initially held out the following week against Vanderbilt. With Auburn trailing 13-10, White started the 2nd half and threw a go-ahead touchdown to Darius Slayton, leading Auburn to a 23–16 comeback win and temporarily keeping postseason chances alive. Playoff hopes were short-lived however, as the injuries to White, as well as starting tailback Kamryn Pettway, limited Auburn’s offense the next week and the Tigers lost to Georgia in Athens. After missing the Iron Bowl for the second straight year due to injury, White returned in the Sugar Bowl against Oklahoma, but was replaced in the 2nd quarter after breaking his arm. White finished 2016 with 1,679 passing yards, 11 total touchdowns, 3 interceptions, and led the SEC with a 63.9 completion percentage.

White missed spring practice in 2017 due to injury and lost the starting position to Baylor transfer Jarrett Stidham. On September 18, 2017, he was dismissed from the team following a public intoxication arrest, ending his career at Auburn.

=== Statistics ===
		Passing						Rushing			
Year	Team	Comp	Att	Yds	TD	INT	Rate	Att	Yds	Avg	TD
2014	Auburn	0	0	0	0	0	0	0	0	0	0
2015	Auburn	83	143	1,166	1	4	123.2	30	35	1.2	0
2016	Auburn	133	208	1,679	9	3	143.1	55	163	3.0	2
Career		216	351	2,845	10	7	135.0	85	198	2.3	2

== Controversy ==
White was arrested and charged with public intoxication shortly before 3 a.m. on Homecoming Night, September 17, 2017. Auburn head coach Gus Malzahn dismissed White from the team the next day, stating: "He has made poor decisions that are not in the best interest of our program, and more importantly, himself.”

In February 2018, a municipal court judge in the city of Auburn dismissed the public intoxication charge against White.

== Personal life ==
White’s younger brother, Drew, played linebacker at Notre Dame.
