= Baker Mayfield =

American football player (born 1995)

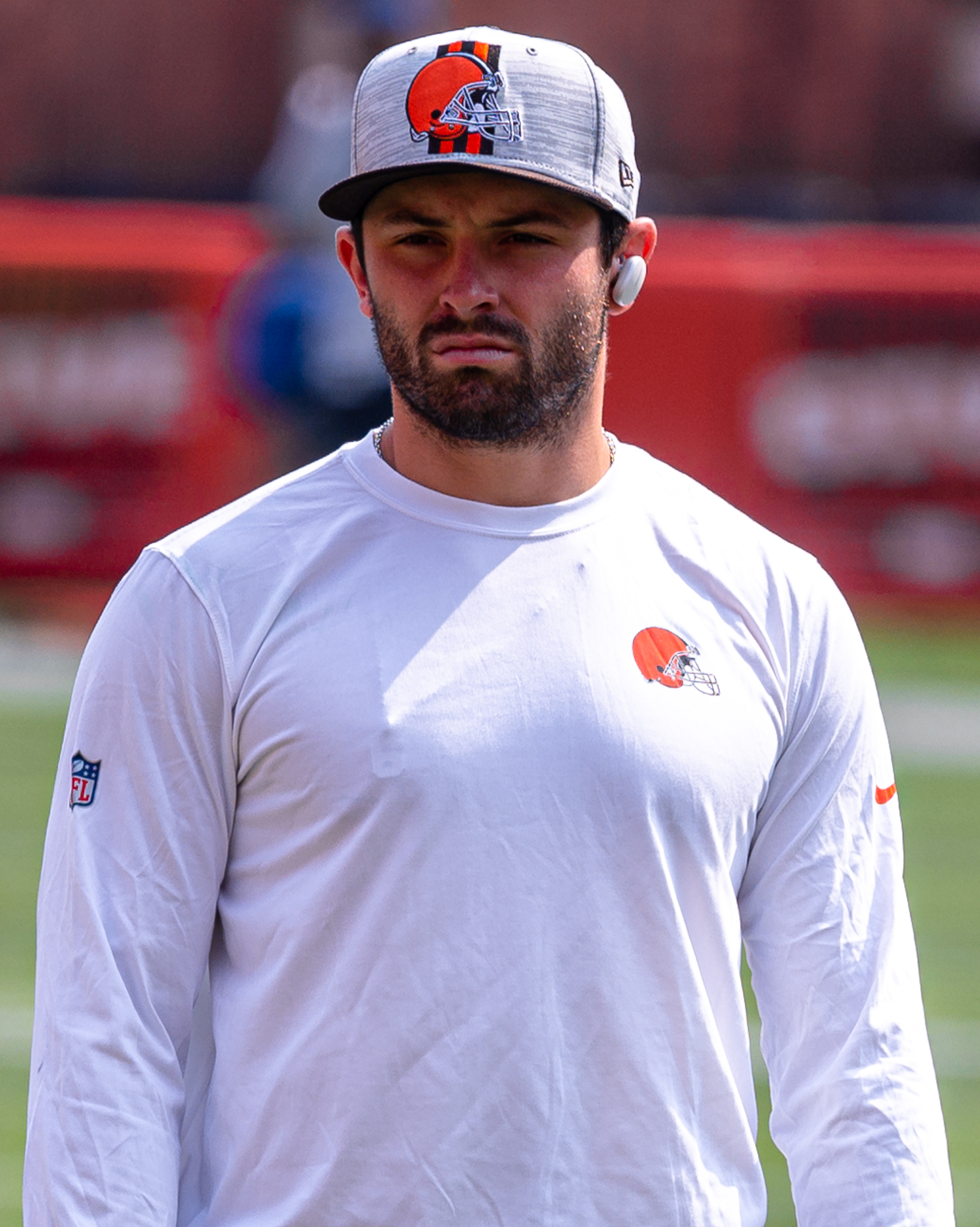
- Mayfield with the Cleveland Browns in 2021

No. 6 – Tampa Bay Buccaneers
- Position: Quarterback
- Roster status: Active

Personal information
- Born: April 14, 1995 (age 31); Austin, Texas, U.S.
- Listed height: 6 ft 1 in (1.85 m)
- Listed weight: 215 lb (98 kg)

Career information
- High school: Lake Travis (Austin)
- College: Texas Tech (2013); Oklahoma (2014–2017)
- NFL draft: 2018: 1st round, 1st overall pick

Career history
- Cleveland Browns (2018–2021); Carolina Panthers (2022); Los Angeles Rams (2022); Tampa Bay Buccaneers (2023–present)

Awards and highlights
- 2× Pro Bowl (2023, 2024); Heisman Trophy (2017); 2× First-team All-American (2015, 2017); 2× NCAA passer rating leader (2016, 2017); 2× NCAA completion percentage leader (2016, 2017); 2× Big 12 Offensive Player of the Year (2015, 2017); 3× First-team All-Big 12 (2015–2017); NFL record: Career playoff passer rating (minimum 150 attempts): 105.9

Career NFL statistics as of Week 9, 2026
- Passing attempts: 4,080
- Passing completions: 2,586
- Completion percentage: 63.4%
- TD–INT: 200–105
- Passing yards: 29,447
- Passer rating: 90.6
- Rushing yards: 1,663
- Rushing touchdowns: 12
- Stats at Pro Football Reference

Baker Reagan Mayfield (born April 14, 1995) is an American professional football quarterback for the Tampa Bay Buccaneers of the National Football League (NFL). He began his college football career with the Texas Tech Red Raiders before transferring to the Oklahoma Sooners. In 2017, he became the first Heisman Trophy winner since the introduction of athletic scholarships in the 1950s to have begun his college career as a walk-on. The Cleveland Browns selected him first overall in the 2018 NFL draft.

As a rookie, Mayfield threw 27 touchdown passes, setting an NFL rookie record that stood until Justin Herbert broke it in 2020. In his NFL debut, he led the Browns to a comeback victory that ended the franchise's 19-game winless streak. In 2020, he helped Cleveland make its first playoff appearance since 2002 and win its first playoff game since 1994. After Cleveland acquired Deshaun Watson, Mayfield was traded to the Carolina Panthers in 2022 and later played for the Los Angeles Rams.

Mayfield signed with Tampa Bay in 2023. In his first two seasons with the Buccaneers, he helped the team win consecutive NFC South titles and a playoff game, and he was selected to the Pro Bowl in both seasons. His career postseason passer rating of 105.9 is the highest in NFL history among quarterbacks with at least 150 attempts.

== Early life ==
Baker Reagan Mayfield was born on April 14, 1995, in Austin, Texas, to James and Gina Mayfield. He is the younger of their two sons. His mother chose the name Baker, and his father selected Reagan as his middle name in honor of President Ronald Reagan. During Mayfield's senior year in high school, his family sold its home and moved among rental properties after his father, a private equity consultant, encountered financial difficulties.

Mayfield grew up as a fan of the Oklahoma Sooners and attended the team's games with his family. His father played quarterback and punter for the University of Houston from 1967 to 1969 but did not letter.

Mayfield was the starting quarterback for the Lake Travis High School Cavaliers in Austin. He posted a 25–2 record over two seasons and led the team to the 2011 Class 4A state championship. He finished his high school career with 6,255 passing yards, 67 touchdowns, and eight interceptions. Mayfield received scholarship offers from Washington State, Rice, New Mexico, and Florida Atlantic, but chose to attend Texas Tech as a walk-on.

== College career ==
=== Texas Tech ===
==== 2013 season ====
With projected starter Michael Brewer sidelined by a back injury, Mayfield was named Texas Tech's starting quarterback shortly before the 2013 season opener against SMU. He became the first walk-on true freshman quarterback to start an FBS season opener.

Mayfield completed 43 of 60 passes for 413 yards and four touchdowns in Texas Tech's 41–23 victory over SMU. His 43 completions set a Texas Tech record for a quarterback in a career debut, and he was named Big 12 Conference Offensive Player of the Week.

A knee injury limited Mayfield during the season, and Davis Webb made four starts before Mayfield returned for the final two regular-season games. Mayfield finished the season with 2,315 passing yards on 218 completions in 340 attempts, with 12 touchdowns and nine interceptions.

In November, Mayfield was named one of 10 semifinalists for the Burlsworth Trophy. He was later named Big 12 Offensive Freshman of the Year. In December, Mayfield announced that he would transfer from Texas Tech.

=== Oklahoma ===
==== 2014 season ====
Mayfield enrolled at the University of Oklahoma in January 2014 and joined the Sooners as a walk-on. He arrived without having contacted the coaching staff and introduced himself to head coach Bob Stoops after enrolling. Mayfield sat out the season under NCAA transfer rules and worked with Oklahoma's scout team. His appeal for immediate eligibility was denied in September.

==== 2015 season ====
On August 24, 2015, Stoops named Mayfield the starting quarterback for the 2015 season after a competition with Trevor Knight and Cody Thomas. In his second start, he helped Oklahoma overcome a 17-point deficit to defeat Tennessee 31–24 in double overtime. The following week against Tulsa, Mayfield set an Oklahoma record with 572 yards of total offense. He passed for 487 yards and four touchdowns and rushed for 85 yards and two touchdowns in a 52–38 win.

Mayfield finished the season with 3,700 passing yards, 36 touchdowns, and seven interceptions. He was named the Big 12 Offensive Player of the Year and first-team All-Big 12, won the Burlsworth Trophy, and received first-team All-America recognition from Sporting News and the Walter Camp Football Foundation. He finished fourth in Heisman Trophy voting.

Oklahoma finished the regular season 11–1 and won the Big 12 championship after defeating Oklahoma State 58–23. The Sooners reached the College Football Playoff but lost 37–17 to Clemson in the Orange Bowl semifinal. Mayfield passed for 311 yards and one touchdown in the game.

==== 2016 season ====
In June 2016, the Big 12 amended its transfer rule to allow walk-ons who had not received a written scholarship offer from their former school to transfer within the conference without losing a season of eligibility. The change restored Mayfield's eligibility for the 2017 season.

On October 22, Mayfield completed 27 of 36 passes for 545 yards and a school-record seven touchdowns in a 66–59 win over Texas Tech. Oklahoma became the first team to finish 9–0 in Big 12 regular-season play and won its second consecutive conference championship.

Mayfield passed for 3,965 yards, 40 touchdowns, and eight interceptions. He led the FBS with a 70.9 completion percentage and set an FBS single-season record with a 196.4 passing efficiency rating. He finished third in Heisman Trophy voting and won the Burlsworth Trophy for the second consecutive year. In the 2017 Sugar Bowl, Mayfield completed 19 of 28 passes for 296 yards and two touchdowns as Oklahoma defeated Auburn 35–19. He received the Miller-Digby Award as the game's most outstanding player.

==== 2017 season ====
On September 9, Mayfield passed for 386 yards and three touchdowns as Oklahoma defeated No. 2 Ohio State 31–16 in Columbus. After the game, he attempted to plant an Oklahoma flag at midfield and apologized two days later. On November 4, he set Oklahoma records with 598 passing yards and 589 yards of total offense against Oklahoma State. He threw five touchdown passes and ran for another as the Sooners won 62–52.

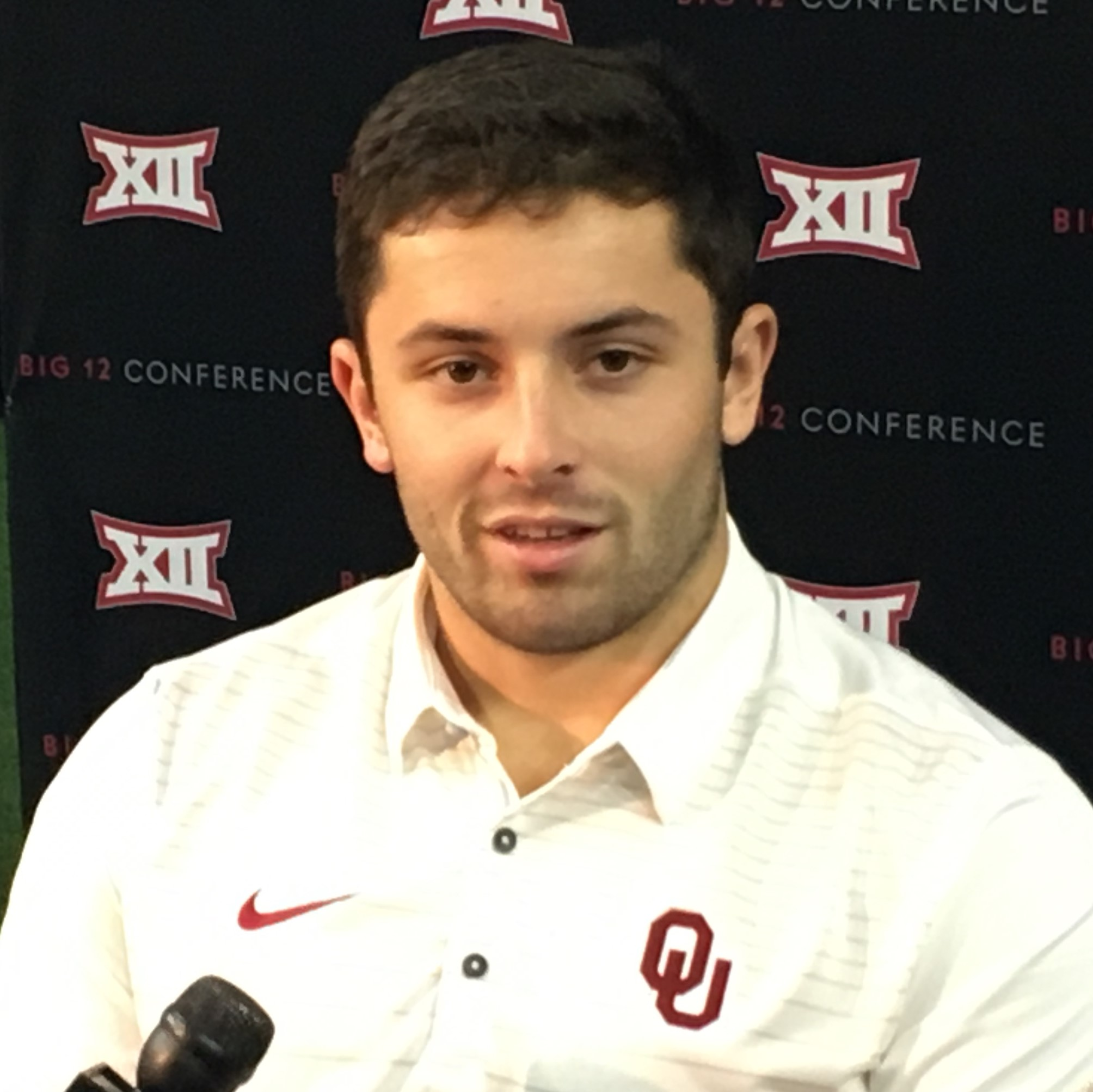
Mayfield at 2017 Big 12 Media Days

During a 41–3 win over Kansas on November 18, Mayfield made an obscene gesture and appeared to shout a profanity toward the Kansas sideline. He apologized after the game. Head coach Lincoln Riley responded by withholding Mayfield from the starting lineup and captaincy for the following game against West Virginia, although Mayfield was permitted to play.

On December 2, Mayfield threw four touchdown passes as Oklahoma defeated TCU 41–17 in the 2017 Big 12 Championship Game. He was named the game's most outstanding player, and the win secured Oklahoma a place in the College Football Playoff. One week later, Mayfield won the 2017 Heisman Trophy. He became the first Heisman winner to begin his college career as a walk-on since athletic scholarships were introduced in the 1950s. He was also named a unanimous first-team All-American and the Big 12 Offensive Player of the Year.

Oklahoma faced Georgia in the 2018 Rose Bowl, a College Football Playoff semifinal, and lost 54–48 in double overtime. Mayfield finished the season with 4,627 passing yards, 43 touchdowns, and six interceptions. He led the FBS with a 70.5 completion percentage and broke his own FBS single-season record with a 198.9 passing efficiency rating.

=== Baker Mayfield rule ===
Texas Tech did not grant Mayfield a full release for an intraconference transfer. Under the rules then in effect, he was required to sit out the 2014 season and lost a season of Big 12 eligibility. Mayfield argued that the eligibility penalty should not apply because he had been a walk-on and had never received a scholarship from Texas Tech. In January 2014, a five-member panel of Texas Tech's athletics council unanimously denied his appeal to retain the season of eligibility.

Texas Tech later permitted Oklahoma to place Mayfield on scholarship but did not waive the transfer restriction that prevented him from playing during the 2014 season. Mayfield also sought a waiver from the NCAA for immediate eligibility, arguing that his former walk-on status distinguished him from scholarship transfers. The NCAA denied that appeal in September 2014.

On June 1, 2016, the Big 12 faculty athletics representatives voted 5–5 on a proposal that would have allowed walk-ons to transfer within the conference without losing a season of eligibility. Because the proposal did not receive a majority, it initially failed. The representatives reconsidered the issue the following day and approved an amended proposal by a 7–3 vote. The amendment applied to walk-ons who had not received a written scholarship offer from their former school.

Because Mayfield had not received a written scholarship offer from Texas Tech, the change restored his eligibility to play for Oklahoma in 2017. The amendment became commonly known as the "Baker Mayfield rule". Texas Tech voted in favor of the amended proposal.

== Professional career ==
Pre-draft measurables
Height	Weight	Arm length	Hand span	Wingspan	40-yard dash	10-yard split	20-yard split	20-yard shuttle	Three-cone drill	Vertical jump	Broad jump	Wonderlic
6 ft 0 5/8 in (1.84 m)	215 lb (98 kg)	30 1/4 in (0.77 m)	9 1/4 in (0.23 m)	6 ft 1 3/8 in (1.86 m)	4.84 s	1.62 s	2.84 s	4.28 s	7.00 s	29 in (0.74 m)	9 ft 3 in (2.82 m)	25
All values from NFL Scouting Combine

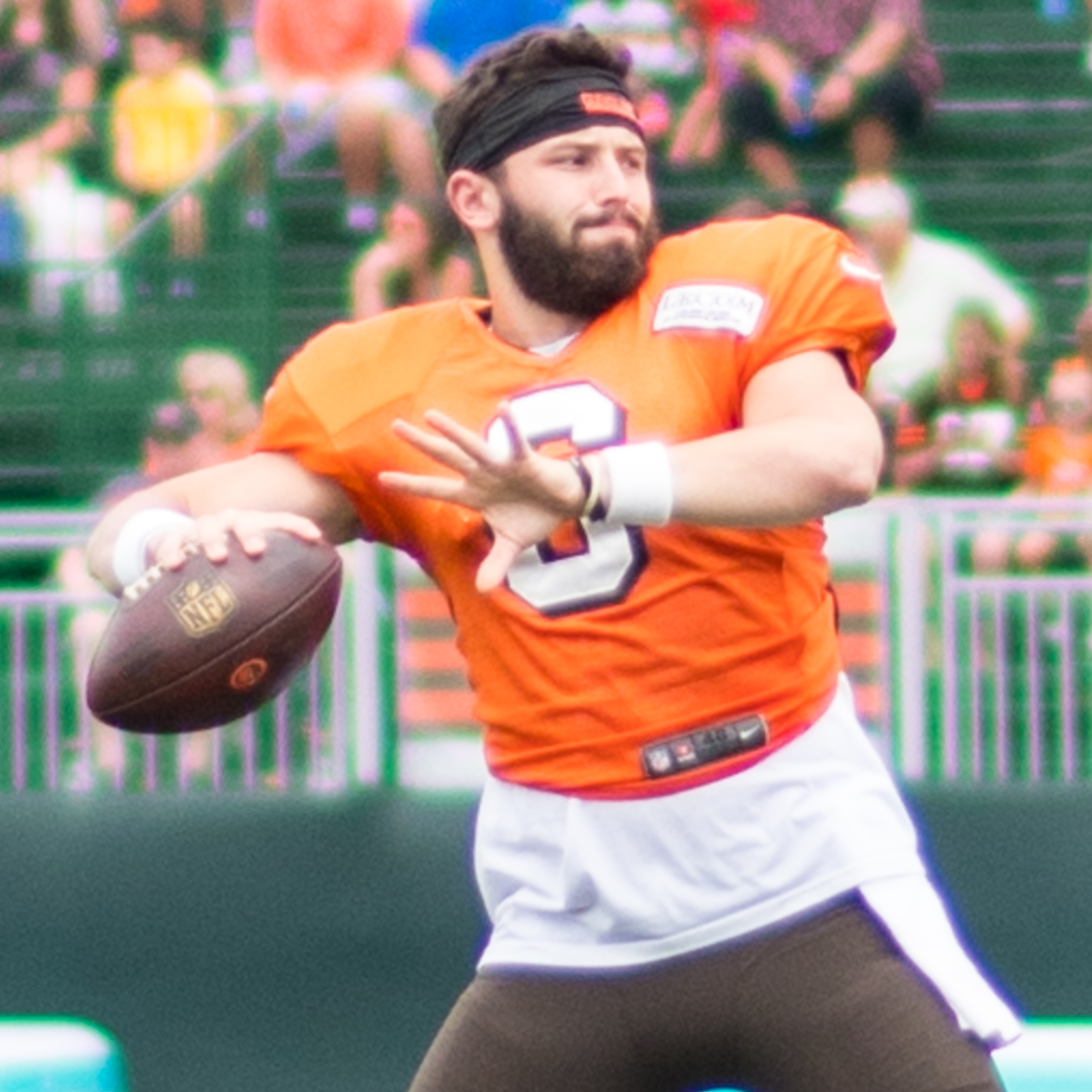
Mayfield in 2018 training camp

=== Cleveland Browns ===
==== 2018 season ====
The Cleveland Browns selected Mayfield with the first overall pick in the 2018 NFL draft. Mayfield signed a four-year rookie contract with the Browns on July 24, 2018, with the deal worth $32.68 million in guaranteed salary.

Mayfield played in his first NFL game in Week 3 against the New York Jets, replacing an injured Tyrod Taylor with the Browns down 14–0. Mayfield went 17 of 23, passing for 201 yards as the Browns came back and prevailed 21–17, ending their winless streak at 19 games. Mayfield became the first player since Fran Tarkenton in 1961 to come off the bench in his debut, throw for more than 200 yards, and lead his team to its first win of the season.

Mayfield started for the first time in the Browns' next game, making him the 30th starting quarterback for the Browns since their return to the NFL in 1999, in a 45–42 overtime loss to the Oakland Raiders. In Week 5, Mayfield threw for 342 passing yards and one touchdown as he earned his first victory as a Browns starter, in a 12–9 overtime win over the Baltimore Ravens. In Week 10, Mayfield led the Browns to a 28–16 victory over the Atlanta Falcons. throwing for 216 yards, three touchdowns, and a passer rating of 151.2, with no turnovers. The following week, Mayfield led the Browns to their first away win since 2015, against the Cincinnati Bengals. He completed 19 of 26 passes for 258 yards and four touchdowns. In Week 12, in a 29–13 loss to the Houston Texans, Mayfield passed for 397 yards, one touchdown, and three interceptions. Mayfield bounced back in the following game, a 26–20 victory over the Carolina Panthers, going 18 of 22 for 238 passing yards and one touchdown.

In Week 16, Mayfield completed 27 of 37 passes for 284 yards and three touchdowns with no interceptions in a 26–18 win over the Cincinnati Bengals, earning him American Football Conference (AFC) Offensive Player of the Week. He also won the Pepsi NFL Rookie of the Week fan vote for the sixth time. On December 29, Mayfield was fined $10,026 for unsportsmanlike conduct during the game. As reported by The Plain Dealer, Mayfield "pretended to expose his private parts" to Browns offensive coordinator Freddie Kitchens after throwing a touchdown to tight end Darren Fells. Kitchens later defended the gesture as an inside joke between the two. Mayfield's agent Tom Mills said they would appeal the fine. On December 30, in the regular-season finale against the Ravens' league-best defense and fellow rookie quarterback Lamar Jackson, Mayfield threw for 376 yards and three touchdowns, but his three costly interceptions — one of which came at the hands of linebacker C. J. Mosley with 1:02 left in the fourth quarter while attempting to drive the team into range of a game-winning field goal attempt — ultimately contributed to a 26–24 loss.

Nonetheless, Mayfield helped lead the Browns to finish the season at 7–8–1, their best record since 2007. He finished with 3,725 passing yards, and surpassed Peyton Manning and Russell Wilson for most touchdowns thrown in a rookie season with 27.

While Mayfield was considered by many to be the favorite for Offensive Rookie of the Year for 2018, the award was won by Giants running back Saquon Barkley. However, the Pro Football Writers of America named him the NFL Rookie of the Year. On the annual Top 100 Players list for 2019, Mayfield's peers named him the 50th best player in the league, one spot behind teammate Myles Garrett. He was named 2018 PFWA All-Rookie, the second Cleveland quarterback to receive this honor since Tim Couch in 1999.

==== 2019 season ====
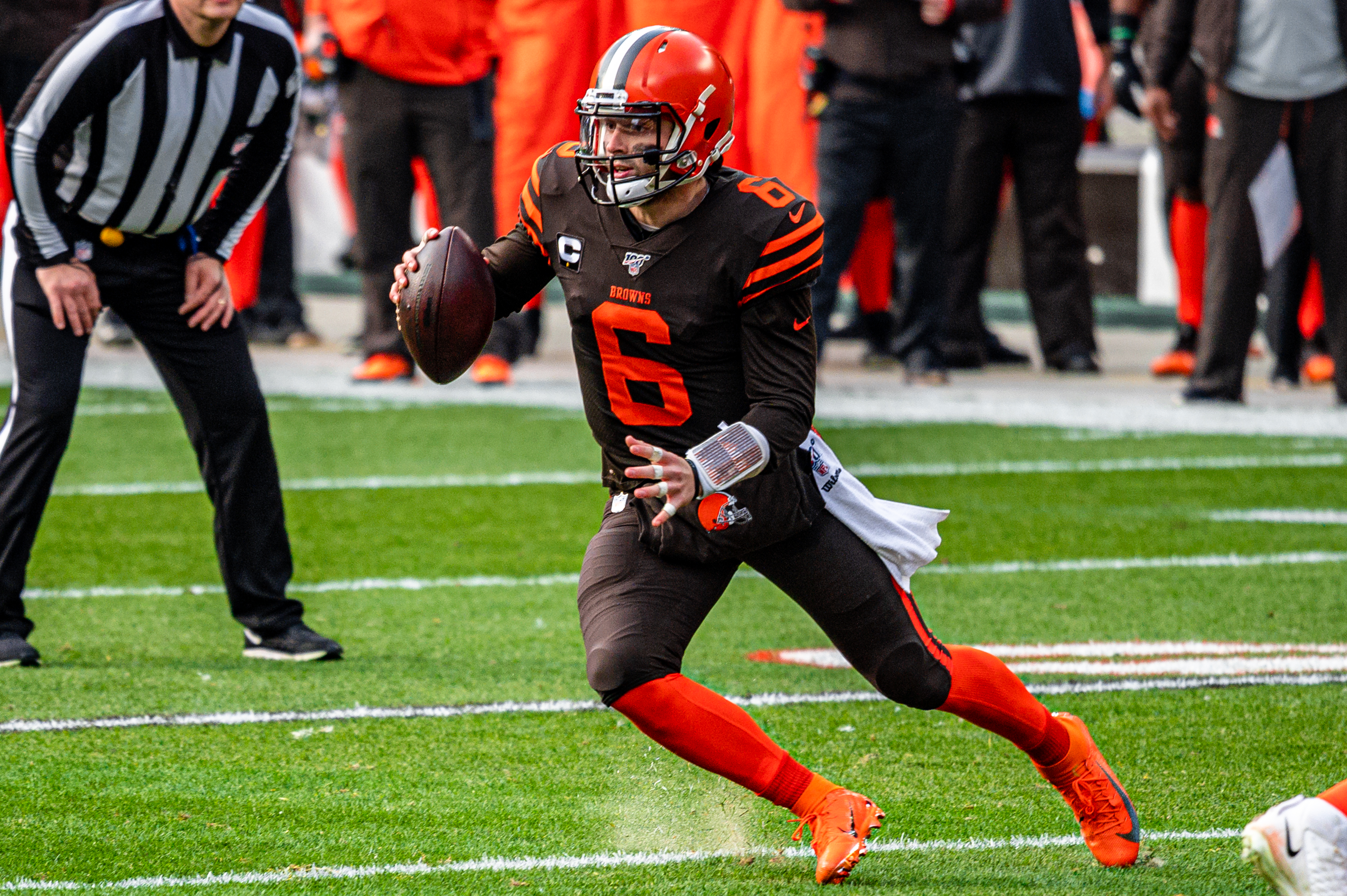
Mayfield against the Cincinnati Bengals in 2019

In Week 1 against the Tennessee Titans, Mayfield threw for 285 yards and a touchdown. However, he also threw three fourth-quarter interceptions, one of which was returned by Malcolm Butler for a touchdown. The Browns lost 43–13. After the blowout loss, Mayfield said, "I just think everybody just needs to be more disciplined. I think everybody knows what the problem is. We'll see if it's just bad technique or just see what it is. Dumb penalties hurting ourself and then penalties on my part. Just dumb stuff." In Week 2 against the Jets, Mayfield finished with 325 passing yards, including a quick-attack pass to Beckham that went 89 yards for a touchdown, as the Browns won 23–3. In Week 4 against the Ravens, Mayfield threw for 342 yards, one touchdown, and one interception in the 40–25 win. Against the San Francisco 49ers, Mayfield struggled against a stout 49ers defense, completing just 8-of-22 passes for 100 yards with two interceptions as the Browns were routed 31–3.

Mayfield threw two touchdown passes in a game for the first time that year in a Week 10 victory against the Buffalo Bills, completing 26 of 38 passes for 238 yards with two TDs, including the game-winner to Rashard Higgins, as the Browns snapped a four-game losing streak with a 19–16 win. Four days later, against the Pittsburgh Steelers and former Big 12 Conference rival Mason Rudolph, Mayfield recorded his first career win against Pittsburgh, accounting for three total touchdowns (2 passing, 1 rushing), as Cleveland won 21–7. In Week 12 against the Miami Dolphins, Mayfield threw for 327 yards, three touchdowns, and one interception in the 41–24 victory. In Week 17 against the Bengals, Mayfield became the first Cleveland Browns QB to start all 16 games in a season since Tim Couch in 2001. In the game, Mayfield threw for 279 yards, three touchdowns, and three interceptions as the Browns lost 33–23. Mayfield finished the 2019 season with 3,827 passing yards, 22 touchdowns, and 21 interceptions as the Browns finished with a 6–10 record.

==== 2020 season ====
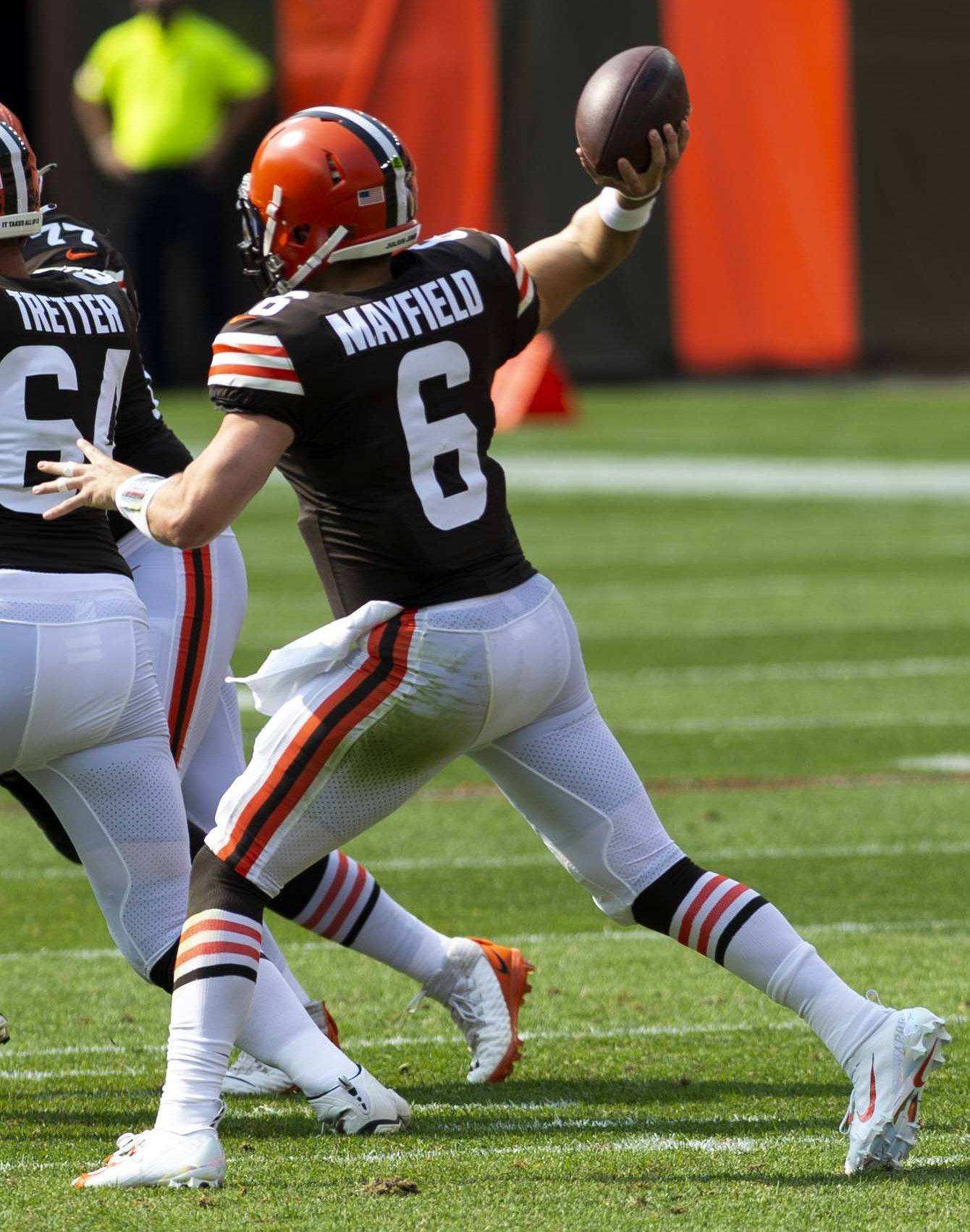
Mayfield in 2020

In Week 1 against the Ravens, Mayfield threw for 189 passing yards, a touchdown and an interception in a 38–6 loss. He bounced back in Week Two, against the Bengals, finishing with 218 passing yards, two touchdowns and an interception in the Browns' 35–30 win. In Week 6 against the Steelers, Mayfield completed 10 of 18 passes for 119 yards, with one touchdown, two interceptions and took four sacks during the 38–7 loss. Mayfield was replaced by Case Keenum in the third quarter due to aggravation of a minor rib injury he suffered in the previous week's game. In Week 7, against the Cincinnati Bengals, Mayfield struggled early, as the only one of his first five pass attempts which was caught was an interception, but later completed 22 of 23 passes for 297 yards and a career-high five touchdowns – the last one to Donovan Peoples-Jones with 11 seconds remaining in the fourth quarter – leading the Browns to a stunning 37–34 comeback victory. Mayfield was named AFC Offensive Player of the Week for his performance in Week 7.

Mayfield was placed on the reserve/COVID-19 list on November 8 after being in close contact with a person who tested positive for the virus, and was activated three days later. In Week 13 against the Titans, Mayfield completed 25 of 33 passes for 334 yards. His four touchdown passes all came in the first half, as the Browns defeated the Titans by a score of 41–35. Mayfield's four first-half TDs tied Otto Graham for a franchise record. Mayfield came close to throwing six first-half TDs, as Peoples-Jones dropped a would-be touchdown, leading to a field goal, and running back Nick Chubb wrapped up the scoring with a one-yard run near the end of the first half after Mayfield completed a 17-yard pass play to Rashard Higgins, setting up Chubb for the score. The Browns scored on all six of their first half possessions. The victory gave the Browns a 9–3 record, clinching the Browns' first winning season since 2007. Mayfield was named the FedEx Air player of the week for Week 13. In Week 14 against the Ravens, Mayfield threw for 343 yards, 2 touchdowns, and 1 interception as well as rushing for 23 yards and a touchdown during the 47–42 loss. In Week 16 against the Jets, Mayfield lost a fumble on fourth down with 1:25 remaining in the game while attempting a quarterback sneak during the 23–16 loss. In Week 17, Mayfield and the Browns defeated the Pittsburgh Steelers 24–22 and earned their first playoff berth since 2002, at which time Mayfield was seven years old. The Browns finished the 2020 regular season 11–5.

In the Wild Card Round against the Pittsburgh Steelers, Mayfield went 21 of 34 for 263 yards and 3 touchdowns during the 48–37 win, leading the Browns to their first playoff victory since the 1994 season, the year before Mayfield was born. It was also the Browns' first playoff road victory in 51 years, way back in 1969. In the Divisional Round of the playoffs against the Kansas City Chiefs, Mayfield threw for 204 yards, 1 touchdown, and 1 interception during the 22–17 loss.

Overall, Mayfield finished the 2020 season with 4,030 passing yards, 30 touchdowns, and nine interceptions through 18 total games. He was ranked 71st by his fellow players on the NFL Top 100 Players of 2021.

==== 2021 season ====
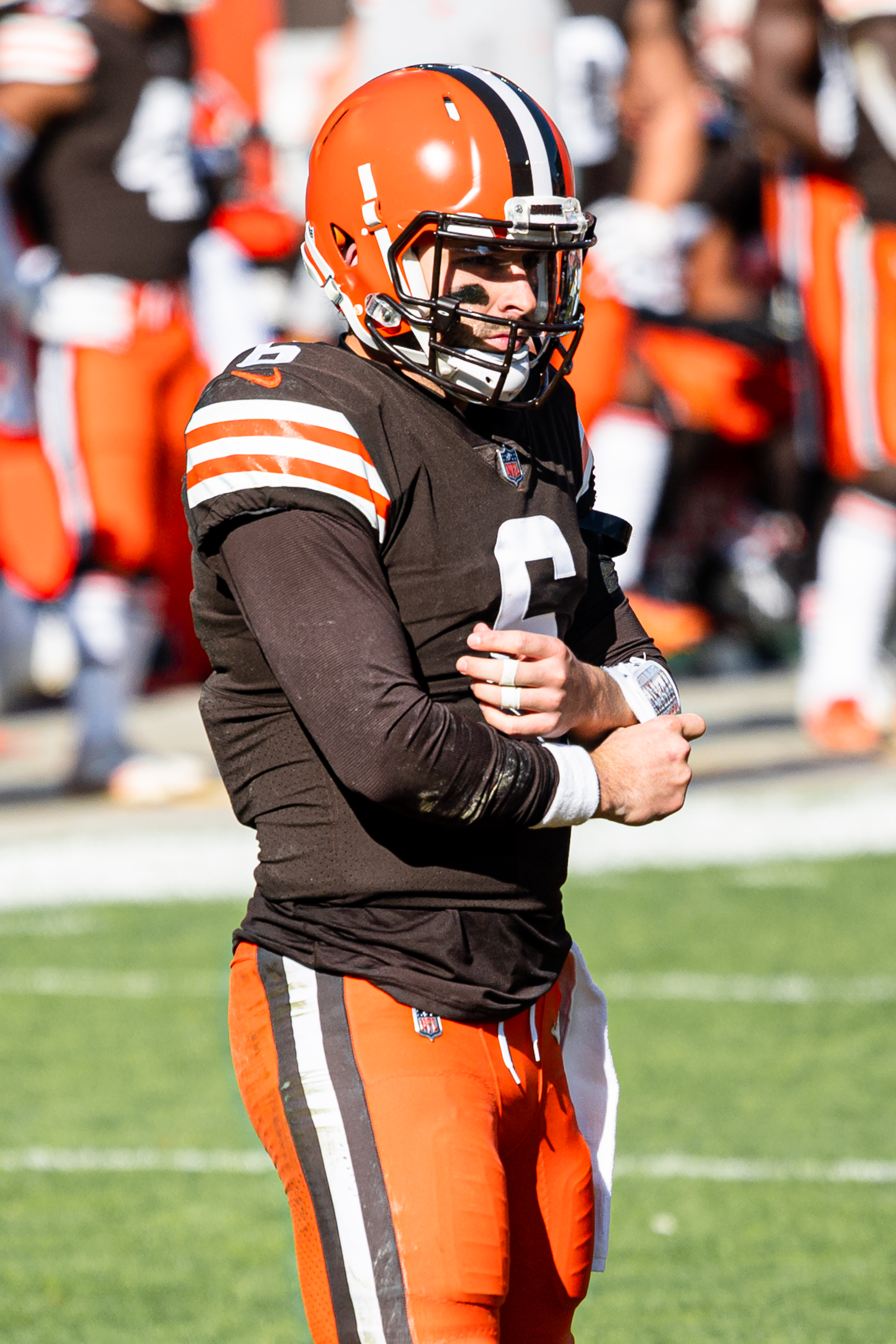
Mayfield with the Browns in 2021

The Browns exercised Mayfield's fifth-year contract option for the 2022 season on April 23, 2021, worth $18.9 million guaranteed. On October 7, 2021, it was revealed that Mayfield was playing with a partially torn labrum which he suffered during the Browns' Week 2 victory over the Texans. Mayfield continued to play with the injury until reaggravating it in Week 6 against the Arizona Cardinals. Due to the injury, Mayfield was ruled out for the Browns' Week 7 game against the Denver Broncos, missing his first game since taking over as the Browns' starter in 2018. On November 14, 2021, Mayfield suffered a right knee contusion during their crushing Week 10 loss to the New England Patriots. While the injury was not severe, coach Kevin Stefanski decided not to put him in for the rest of the game due to Mayfield absorbing hits and the game being out of reach. After the Browns were eliminated from the postseason following a Week 17 loss to the Steelers, the Browns announced Mayfield would undergo surgery on the torn labrum, ending Mayfield's season. He was placed on injured reserve on January 5, 2022. Mayfield threw for 3,010 yards, 17 touchdowns, and 13 interceptions in 14 games played.

In the 2022 offseason, after the Browns traded for quarterback Deshaun Watson and signed him to a contract extension, Mayfield requested that the team trade him.

=== Carolina Panthers ===
On July 6, 2022, Mayfield was traded to the Panthers for a 2024 conditional fifth-round draft pick. The fifth-round pick would become a fourth-round pick if Mayfield played in 70% of the Panthers' offensive snaps, but it did not happen.

Mayfield competed against Sam Darnold for the starting position with the team. On August 22, 2022, Mayfield was named the Week 1 starter for the Panthers for their game against the Browns. Against the Browns, Mayfield threw for 235 yards, a touchdown, and an interception in the 26–24 loss despite a late rally. Mayfield suffered a high-ankle sprain in the Panthers' Week 5 loss to the 49ers, which made him miss the next week against the Los Angeles Rams. Mayfield returned and backed up P. J. Walker starting in Week 8. In the Week 9 game against the Bengals, the Panthers were trailing 35–0 at halftime behind a disastrous start by Walker; Interim Head Coach Steve Wilks inserted Mayfield for the second half, in which he threw for 155 yards and two touchdowns in the 42–21 loss. Wilks announced that he would return to Walker as his starting quarterback for Week 10.

With a 1–5 record, Mayfield later requested his release from the Panthers, which was granted on December 5, 2022.

=== Los Angeles Rams ===
On December 6, 2022, Mayfield was claimed off waivers by the Rams after starting quarterback Matthew Stafford sustained a spinal cord injury on December 2. The Rams inherited the remaining $1.35 million on his contract. With only two days for Mayfield to learn the playbook after he was claimed, the Rams started John Wolford at quarterback for their game against the Las Vegas Raiders. Rams' head coach Sean McVay benched Wolford after the first offensive series, though, and inserted Mayfield. The Rams were trailing 16–3 in the fourth quarter, seemingly headed for their seventh consecutive loss, when Mayfield led them on a comeback. With 1:45 remaining in the game, still down by 6 points, and with no timeouts left to use, the Rams' offense took the field at their own two-yard line. Mayfield then led the Rams to a game-winning 98-yard drive, which became the longest touchdown drive of his career. Mayfield completed 22 of 35 passes for 230 yards without an interception in the game and was named the National Football Conference Offensive Player of the Week.

In a Week 15 Monday Night Football matchup against the Green Bay Packers, Mayfield threw his 100th career passing touchdown. In a Week 16 matchup against the Broncos, Mayfield led the Rams to a dominant 51–14 win while completing 24 of 28 pass attempts for 230 yards and throwing for two touchdowns.

Mayfield would later credit his five-game stint with the Rams for rejuvenating his career following the disappointment of his time with Carolina. “It brought the fun back. When I’m having fun, talking trash, and enjoying it, like that’s when I’m my best. Yeah, I needed that,” Mayfield said.

=== Tampa Bay Buccaneers ===
==== 2023 season ====
On March 15, 2023, the Tampa Bay Buccaneers signed Mayfield to a one-year, $4 million contract that includes a signing bonus of $2.87 million. Mayfield was brought in to compete against Kyle Trask and John Wolford to determine who would be the successor at starting quarterback to Tom Brady after he retired after the 2022 NFL season.

In Week 1 against the Minnesota Vikings, Mayfield went 3 for 11 to start the game, but soon thereafter threw a touchdown to end the first half. After that, Mayfield went 18/23 for 110 yards and a touchdown for the rest of the game, including a crucial scramble for a first down to secure a 20–17 victory. In Week 2 against the Chicago Bears, Mayfield went 26 for 34 for 317 yards and one touchdown in a 27–17 win. His 76% completion percentage for this game narrowly marked the best completion rate of his career at that point, in any of 33 games with 33+ pass attempts. Before that, his 75.8% completion rate on December 6, 2020, in a win against the Titans while on the Browns, had been his highest completion rate. This was also the first time in his career that Mayfield had started 2–0. In Week 3 against the Philadelphia Eagles, Mayfield went 15/25 for 146 yards, with one touchdown and one interception, his first turnover of the season. He had one rush for 2 yards and fumbled once, which was recovered by Tampa Bay. Mayfield was also sacked twice.

In Week 15 against the Packers, Mayfield posted a perfect passer rating, completing 22 of 28 passes for 381 yards and four touchdowns in a 34–20 win. He was the first opposing quarterback to ever have a perfect passer rating at Lambeau Field. He was named the National Football Conference (NFC) Offensive Player of the Week for this performance. In Week 18 against the Panthers, Mayfield led the Buccaneers to a 9–0 victory, clinching the Buccaneers' third straight NFC South title. Mayfield concluded the season with 28 touchdown passes, 4,044 passing yards and a 64.3% completion rate, all career highs. He earned his first Pro Bowl nomination.

In the Wild Card Round game against the Eagles, Mayfield completed 22 of 36 passes, for 337 yards, with three touchdowns and no interceptions. He led the Buccaneers to a 32–9 win over the defending NFC champions. In the Divisional round against the Detroit Lions, Mayfield completed 26 of 41 passes for 349 yards, three touchdowns and two interceptions. The second interception proved costly as it allowed the Lions to run out the clock as the Buccaneers lost, 31–23.

==== 2024 season ====
On March 10, 2024, Mayfield signed a three-year contract extension with the Buccaneers, worth up to $100 million, with $50 million guaranteed. In Week 1, Mayfield went 24-of-30 for 289 yards and four touchdowns in a 37–20 win over the Commanders. In a rematch of last season's Divisional round playoff game, Mayfield completed 12 passes for 185 yards and ran for a go-ahead touchdown as the Buccaneers beat the Lions 20–16. After a poor performance against the Denver Broncos, Mayfield rebounded the following week against the Eagles, throwing for 347 yards and accounting for three touchdowns as Tampa improved to 3–1. In Week 5 against the Falcons, Mayfield threw three touchdown passes in the first half, but a lack of efficiency on offense in the second half cost the Buccaneers as they lost in overtime. In Week 6, Mayfield threw for 325 yards, four touchdown passes, and overcame three interceptions in the second quarter to win 51–27 against the Saints, leading the offense to a franchise record 594 yards.

In a 41–31 loss to the Baltimore Ravens in Week 7, Mayfield threw for 370 yards and three touchdowns, but he threw a pair of costly interceptions in the first half and lost receivers Mike Evans and Chris Godwin, the latter of whom ruled out for the season. Without his top receivers, Mayfield still completed a career-high 37 passes the following week against the Falcons. He finished with over 300 yards and three touchdowns for the third straight game but threw two interceptions inside the Falcons' 10-yard line as the Buccaneers lost 31–26. Mayfield cut down on his interception miscues and led last-minute game-tying drives against the Chiefs and 49ers, but the Buccaneers lost both games, dropping to 4–6 heading to their bye week. With the return of Mike Evans following the bye, Mayfield had an efficient game against the Giants, completing 24 of 30 passes for 294 yards, no interceptions, and a rushing touchdown as the Bucs won 30–7, snapping their four-game skid. Against the Panthers in Week 13, Mayfield rallied from an Achilles injury and a poor first half to lead Tampa to a game-winning field goal drive in overtime.

Mayfield's play continued to improve with three touchdowns in a win over the Las Vegas Raiders, followed by a near-flawless performance against the league's top-ranked Los Angeles Chargers defense, completing 22-of-27 passes for 288 yards and four touchdowns in a 40–17 victory. In Week 17, Mayfield was 27-for-32 for 359 yards and a career-high five touchdown passes in a 48–14 win over the Panthers, earning NFC Offensive Player of the Week. Needing a win against the Saints to clinch the NFC South, Mayfield led three touchdown drives in the second half and rallied his team from a double-digit deficit to secure their fourth straight division title. Mayfield finished the season completing 71.4% of his passes for 4,500 yards and 41 passing touchdowns, becoming the fourth player in NFL history to have at least 4,000 passing yards, 40 passing touchdowns, and at least a 70% completion percentage in a single season. He also tied with Kirk Cousins for the most interceptions with 16 and fumbles with 13, both of which led the NFL.

Mayfield helped lead the Buccaneers to a playoff berth. In the NFC Wild Card Round, Mayfield led two touchdown drives and two drives that ended in a field goal. In that game, Mayfield threw for 185 yards completing 83.3% of his passes. The Buccaneers' season ended in the Wild Card Round with a 23–20 loss to the Washington Commanders. He was ranked 50th by his fellow players on the NFL Top 100 Players of 2025.

==== 2025 season ====
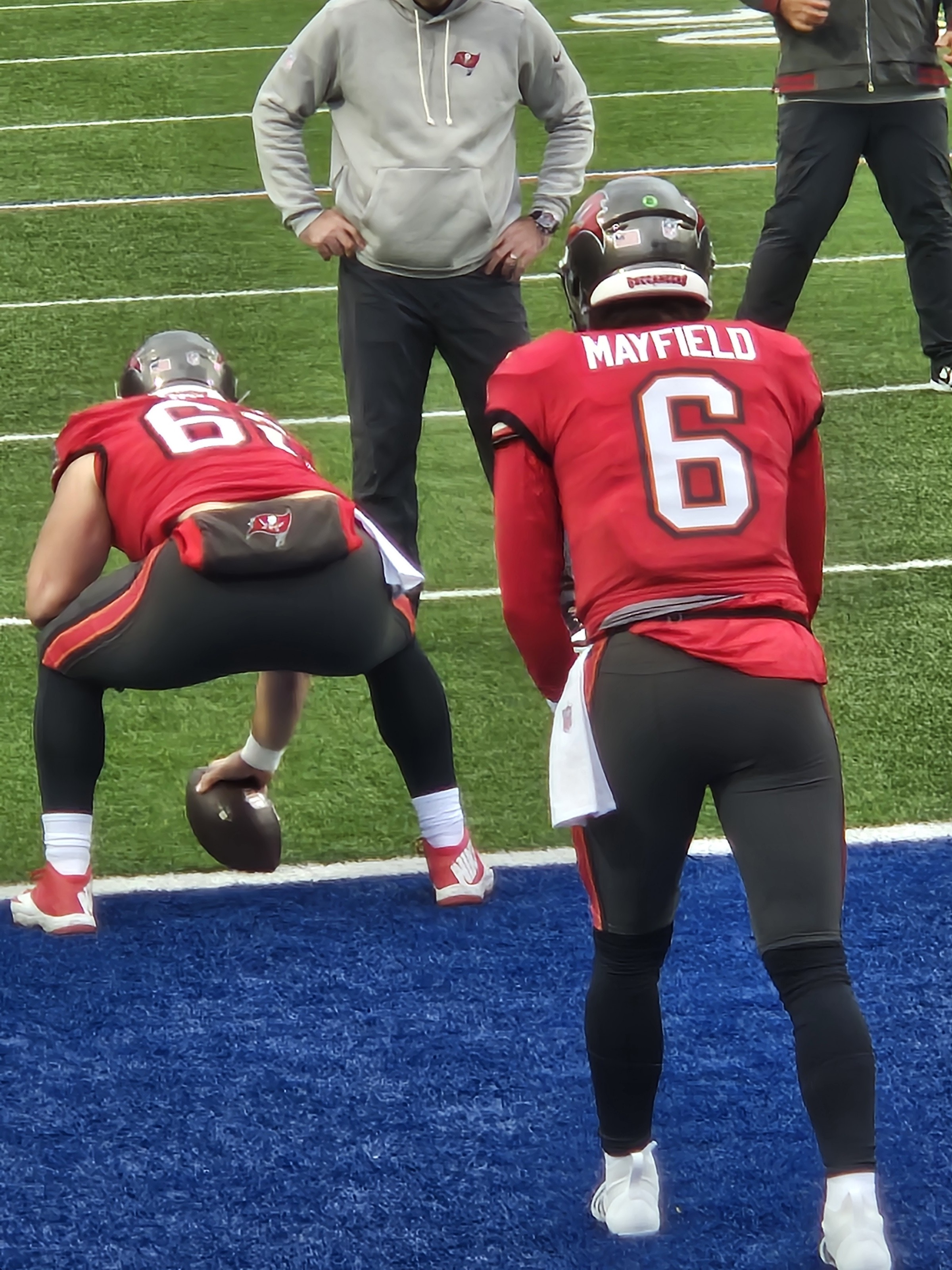
Mayfield and center Graham Barton warming up before a game against the Buffalo Bills in 2025

Mayfield led the Buccaneers to a 5–1 start despite losing Evans and Godwin to injuries again, throwing for 12 touchdowns to just 1 interception during that span and sparking discussion about his candidacy for the NFL MVP Award. The Buccaneers then proceeded to lose four of the next five games, namely to the Detroit Lions, New England Patriots, Buffalo Bills, and Los Angeles Rams, with Mayfield suffering an injury to his non-throwing shoulder in the loss to the Rams. He finished the 2025 season with 3,693 yards, 26 touchdowns, and 11 interceptions to go with a rushing touchdown.

==== 2026 season ====
On September 8, 2026, the Buccaneers and Mayfield agreed to a three-year, $165 million contract extension.

On September 13, 2026, Mayfield had three fumbles, and lost all of them in a 33–27 loss to the Cincinnati Bengals. Two weeks later on September 27, Mayfield dislocated his thumb on his throwing hand late in the fourth quarter of a 23–16 loss to the Minnesota Vikings. An MRI examination the following day confirmed that there was no fracture or tendon tear in the joint, and Buccaneers head coach Todd Bowles said that Mayfield would not need surgery or to be placed on injured reserve.

During Week 8, the Buccaneers shut out the Atlanta Falcons and won 16–0, where Mayfield completed no passes out of three attempts, aside from the Buccaneers combining for 324 rushing yards. It was the first time since 1974 a team won where its quarterback completed none of its passes.

== Career statistics ==
Legend
	NFL record
	Led the league
**Bold**	Career high

=== NFL ===
==== Regular season ====
Year	Team	Games			Passing									Rushing					Sacks		Fumbles	
Year	Team	GP	GS	Record	Cmp	Att	Pct	Yds	Y/A	Lng	TD	Int	Rtg	Att	Yds	Avg	Lng	TD	Sck	SckY	Fum	Lost
2018	CLE	14	13	6–7	310	486	63.8	3,725	7.7	71	27	14	93.7	39	131	3.4	**35**	0	25	173	7	3
2019	CLE	16	16	6–10	317	534	59.4	3,827	7.2	**89**	22	**21**	78.8	28	141	5.0	18	**3**	40	**285**	6	2
2020	CLE	16	16	**11–5**	305	486	62.8	3,563	7.3	75	26	8	95.9	54	165	3.1	28	1	26	162	8	**4**
2021	CLE	14	14	6–8	253	418	60.5	3,010	7.2	71	17	13	83.1	37	134	3.6	14	1	**43**	269	6	3
2022	CAR	7	6	1–5	119	206	57.8	1,313	6.4	75	6	6	74.4	16	52	3.3	17	1	19	126	6	1
2022	LAR	5	4	1–3	82	129	63.6	850	6.6	39	4	2	86.4	15	37	2.5	11	0	17	91	3	1
2023	TB	17	17	9–8	364	566	64.3	4,044	7.1	75	28	10	94.6	**62**	163	2.6	31	1	40	232	8	3
2024	TB	17	17	10–7	**407**	**570**	**71.4**	**4,500**	**7.9**	57	**41**	16	**106.8**	60	378	6.3	28	**3**	40	248	**13** (Note: Tied with Kirk Cousins.)	2
2025	TB	17	17	8–9	343	543	63.2	3,693	6.8	77	26	11	90.6	55	**382**	**6.9**	33	1	36	234	11 (Note: Tied with Sam Darnold and Cam Ward.)	3
2026	TB	6	6	2–4	86	142	60.6	922	6.5	58	3	4	74.9	17	80	4.7	14	1	18	79	6	3
Career		129	126	60–66	2,586	4,080	63.4	29,447	7.2	89	200	105	90.6	383	1,663	4.3	35	12	304	1,899	74	25

==== Postseason ====
Year	Team	Games			Passing									Rushing					Sacks		Fumbles	
Year	Team	GP	GS	Record	Cmp	Att	Pct	Yds	Avg	Lng	TD	Int	Rtg	Att	Yds	Avg	Lng	TD	Sck	SckY	Fum	Lost
2020	CLE	2	2	**1–1**	44	71	62.0	467	6.6	40	4	1	94.0	**8**	14	1.8	6	0	1	8	0	0
2023	TB	2	2	**1–1**	**48**	**77**	62.3	**686**	8.9	**56**	**6**	**2**	106.3	4	**31**	**7.8**	14	0	**8**	**60**	0	0
2024	TB	1	1	0–1	15	18	**83.3**	185	**10.3**	26	2	0	**146.5**	7	23	3.3	**18**	0	1	2	**1**	**1**
Career		5	5	2–3	107	166	64.5	1,338	8.1	56	12	3	105.9	19	68	3.6	18	0	10	70	1	1

=== College ===
Legend
Heisman Trophy
Led the NCAA

Season	Team	Games			Passing								Rushing			
Season	Team	GP	GS	Record	Comp	Att	Pct	Yards	Avg	TD	Int	Rate	Att	Yards	Avg	TD
2013	Texas Tech	8	7	5–2	218	340	64.1	2,315	6.8	12	**9**	127.7	88	190	2.2	3
2014	Oklahoma	Ineligible to play														
2015	Oklahoma	13	13	**11–2**	269	395	68.1	3,700	9.4	36	7	173.3	**141**	**405**	2.9	**7**
2016	Oklahoma	13	13	**11–2**	254	358	**70.9**	3,965	11.1	40	8	196.4	78	177	2.3	6
2017	Oklahoma	14	13	**11–2**	**285**	**404**	70.5	**4,627**	**11.5**	**43**	6	**198.9**	97	311	**3.2**	5
Career		48	46	38–8	1,026	1,497	68.5	14,607	9.8	131	30	175.4	404	1,083	2.7	21

== Career highlights ==
=== Awards and honors ===
NFL

- 2× Pro Bowl (2023, 2024)
- Pro Bowl Offensive MVP (2023)
- Highest playoff passer rating (minimum 150 attempts): 105.9
- 7× Pepsi NFL Rookie of the Week (2018 Weeks 3, 7, 9, 12, 14, 16, 17)
- 2× AFC Offensive Player of the Week: Week 16 (2018), Week 7 (2020)
- 2× NFC Offensive Player of the Week: Week 14 (2022), Week 15 (2023)
- PFT Rookie of the Year (2018)
- PFWA Rookie of the Year (2018)
- PFF Offensive Rookie of the Year (2018)
- PFWA All-Rookie Team (2018)
- 4× NFL Top 100 — 50th (2019), 71st (2021), 50th (2025), 77th (2026)

NCAA

- Heisman Trophy (2017)
- 2× Heisman Trophy Finalist (2016, 2017)
- Maxwell Award (2017)
- Walter Camp Award (2017)
- Davey O'Brien Award (2017)
- Associated Press Player of the Year (2017)
- 2× Sporting News Player of the Year (2015, 2017)
- 2× Burlsworth Trophy (2015, 2016)
- 2× First-team All-American (2015, 2017)
- 2× NCAA passer rating leader (2016, 2017)
- 2× NCAA completion percentage leader (2016, 2017)
- 2× Big 12 Offensive Player of the Year (2015, 2017)
- Big 12 Offensive Freshman of the Year (2013)
- 3× First-team All-Big 12 (2015–2017)
- First former walk-on to win Heisman Trophy

=== Cleveland Browns franchise records ===
- Most consecutive games with at least two passing touchdowns – 5
- Most passing yards per game in a season – 266.1
- Highest QBR for a rookie – 55.7
- Highest passer rating by a rookie – 93.7
- Highest completion percentage by a rookie – 63.8%
- Highest net yards per pass attempt by a rookie – 6.95
- Highest adjusted net yards per pass attempt by a rookie – 6.77
- Lowest percentage of sacks per pass attempt by a rookie – 4.9
- Most pass completions by a rookie – 310
- Most passing yards by a rookie – 3,725
- Most passing yards per game by a rookie – 266.1
- Most 4th quarter comebacks by a rookie – 3
- Most game-winning drives by a rookie – 4
- Most passing yards in a game by a rookie – 397
- Most touchdown passes in a game by a rookie – 4
- Most touchdown passes by a rookie – 27
- Most pass completions in a game by a rookie – 29 (Done twice, tied with Tim Couch)

== Personal life ==
On February 25, 2017, Mayfield was arrested in Washington County, Arkansas on charges of public intoxication, disorderly conduct, and fleeing and resisting arrest. At 2:29 a.m. that Saturday, a police officer was flagged down on an assault and battery report. The person who flagged the officer was yelling at Mayfield. The preliminary police report described Mayfield as unable to walk straight, having slurred speech and food covering the front of his shirt. When he was asked to stay so the police could get a statement, Mayfield began shouting obscenities and "causing a scene". Mayfield was booked at 8:21 a.m. local time on the misdemeanor charges. He had a court date on April 7 for the public intoxication charge, and pleaded not guilty to all charges. On June 15, 2017, the University of Oklahoma ordered Mayfield to perform 35 hours of community service along with completing an alcohol education program.

In July 2019, Mayfield married Emily Wilkinson. In December 2023, the pair announced they were expecting their first child, a girl, who was born in April 2024. In April 2026, their second child, a boy, was born.

During his tenure with the Browns, Mayfield starred in a continuing series of ads for Progressive Insurance. The ads showed him living "at home" in FirstEnergy Stadium with his wife and performing household chores like mowing the lawn and holding a yard sale.

In 2026, Mayfield and his family appeared in the Netflix documentary series Quarterback.

Mayfield is an investor in USL Championship soccer club OKC Energy.
