= 2016 Auburn Tigers football team =

American college football season

2016 Auburn Tigers football

Sugar Bowl, L 19–35 vs. Oklahoma
- Conference: Southeastern Conference
- Western Division

Ranking
- Coaches: No. 22
- AP: No. 24
- Record: 8–5 (5–3 SEC)
- Head coach: Gus Malzahn (4th season)
- Offensive coordinator: Rhett Lashlee (4th season)
- Co-offensive coordinator: Kodi Burns (1st season)
- Offensive scheme: Multiple, hurry-up
- Defensive coordinator: Kevin Steele (1st season)
- Base defense: 4–3
- Home stadium: Jordan–Hare Stadium

2016 Southeastern Conference football standings
	Conf.			Overall
Team	W		L	W		L
Eastern Division
No. 14 Florida x	6	–	2	9	–	4
No. 22 Tennessee	4	–	4	9	–	4
Georgia	4	–	4	8	–	5
Kentucky	4	–	4	7	–	6
South Carolina	3	–	5	6	–	7
Vanderbilt	3	–	5	6	–	7
Missouri*	2	–	6	4	–	8
Western Division
No. 2 Alabama x$^	8	–	0	14	–	1
No. 24 Auburn	5	–	3	8	–	5
No. 13 LSU	5	–	3	8	–	4
Texas A&M	4	–	4	8	–	5
Arkansas	3	–	5	7	–	6
Mississippi State	3	–	5	6	–	7
Ole Miss*	2	–	6	5	–	7
Championship: Alabama 54, Florida 16
^ – College Football Playoff participant; $ – Conference champion; x – Division champion/co-champions; * Ole Miss and Missouri vacated all wins due to NCAA violations.; Rankings from AP Poll

The 2016 Auburn Tigers football team represented Auburn University in the 2016 NCAA Division I FBS football season. The Tigers played their home games at Jordan–Hare Stadium in Auburn, Alabama and competed in the Western Division of the Southeastern Conference (SEC). They were led by fourth-year head coach Gus Malzahn. They finished the season 8–5, 5–3 in SEC play to finish in a tie for second place in the Western Division. They were invited to the Sugar Bowl where they lost to Oklahoma.

== Before the season ==
Following the 2015 season, defensive coordinator Will Muschamp left the program to become the head coach at South Carolina, joining him were Travaris Robinson, Lance Thompson, JB Grimes moved on as well to join Cincinnati's coaching staff.

Kevin Steele was hired to be Auburn's new defensive coordinator, and assistants Wesley McGriff, Travis Williams, and Herb Hand were added to the staff.

The offseason saw numerous transfers including: RB Roc Thomas, TE Chris Laye, OL Jordan Diamond, OL Will Adams, DE Gimel President, LB Javiere Mitchell and S Tim Irvin.

Following the season OL Avery Young and OL Shon Coleman chose to forgo their remaining eligibility by entering the 2016 NFL Draft.

Auburn picked up transfers in Baylor RB Kameron Martin, Illinois LB TJ Neal and Miami, OH CB Marshall Taylor.

Texas RT Darius James and Ohio St CB Jamel Dean now available after sitting out 2015. On August third 2016 Senior running back Jovon Robinson was dismissed from the team.

=== Returning starters ===
- QB – Sean White – Redshirt Sophomore
- H Back – Kamryn Pettway- Redshirt Sophomore
- H Back- Chandler Cox- Sophomore
- WR – Marcus Davis- Senior
- LT – Austin Golson- Redshirt Junior (played center in 2015)
- LG – Alex Kozan- Redshirt Senior
- RG – Braden Smith- Junior
- Buck – Carl Lawson- Redshirt Junior
- NT – Montravius Adams- Senior
- DT – Dontavius Russell- Redshirt Sophomore
- NB – Rudy Ford- Senior
- DB – Joshua Holsey- Redshirt Senior
- CB – Carlton Davis- Sophomore
- FS – Stephen Roberts- Junior
- SS – Tray Matthews- Redshirt Junior
- PK – Daniel Carlson- Redshirt Sophomore
- P – Kevin Phillips- Redshirt Junior

=== Depth chart ===
- Quarterback
  - 13 Sean White – RSO 6' 204
  - 5 John Franklin III – RJR 6'1 176
  - 6 Jeremy Johnson – SR 6'5 234
  - 16 Devin Adams – RJR 6'4 248 (walk on)
  - 15 Tyler Queen – RFR 6'4 241 (injured)
  - 1 Woody Barrett – FR 6'2 238 (likely redshirt)
- Running back
  - 21 Kerryon Johnson -SO 6'1 211
  - 36 Kamryn Pettway – RSO 6'2 242
  - 9 Kamryn Martin – FR 6' 177
  - 32 Malik Miller – FR 5'11 229 (injured)
- H-Back/Tight end
  - 27 Chandler Cox – SO 6'1 236
  - 85 Jalen Harris – RFR 6'5 258
- X Receiver
  - 80 Marcus Davis – SR 5'10 181
  - 3 Nate Craig Myers – FR 6'2 209
  - 4 Jason Smith – RJR 6'1 188
- Y Receiver
  - 83 Ryan Davis – SO 5'9 172
  - 33 Will Hastings – SO 5'9 179 (kicker/walk on)
  - 19 Marquis McClain -FR 6'3 219
- Z Receiver
  - 10 Stanton Truitt – RSO 5'10 188
  - 12 Eli Stove – FR 6' 177
- F Receiver
  - 8 Tony Stevens- SR 6'4 212
  - 82 Darius Slayton – RFR 6'2 202
  - 11 Kyle Davis -FR 6'2 213
- Left Tackle
  - 62 Darius James – RJR 6'5 320
  - 75 Deon Mix – RJR 6'4 312
  - 58 Bailey Sharpe – RFR 6'5 293
- Left Guard
  - 63 Alex Kozan – RJR 6'4 310
  - 67 Marquel Harrell – RFR 6'3 318
  - ?? Brodariuss Hamm – FR 6'5 325 (likely redshirt)
- Center
  - 73 Austin Golson – RJR 6'5 314
  - 52 Xavier Dampeer – SR 6'2 310
  - 64 Kaleb Kim – RFR 6'4 290
- Right Guard
  - 71 Braden Smith – JR 6'6 310
  - 57 Mike Horton – RFR 6'3 325
  - 66 Tyler Carr – RFR 6'6 316
- Right Tackle
  - 70 Robert Leff – RSR 6'6 300
  - 98 Prince Tega Wanogho – RFR 6'8 292
- Buck
  - 55 Carl Lawson – RJR 6'2 258
  - 4 Jeff Holland – SO 6'4 250
  - ? Nick Coe – FR 6'6 270 (likely redshirt)
- Defensive tackle
  - 95 Dontavius Russell – RSO 6'4 309
  - 90 Maurice Swain – RSR 6'3 316
  - 79 Andrew Williams – RSO 6'4 297
  - 99 Tyler Carter – RFR 6'3 288 (walk on)
  - ?? Tashawn Manning −6'5 270 (likely redshirt)
- Nose tackle
  - 1 Montravius Adams – SR 6'4 315
  - 94 Devaroe Lawrence – RSR 6'4 308
  - 5 Derrick Brown – FR 6'5 335
  - 93 Antwaun Jackson – FR 6'2 303
  - 62 Jauntavius Johnson – RFR 6'2 318 (injured)
- Defensive end
  - 3 Marlon Davidson – FR 6'3 273
  - 9 Byron Cowart – SO 6'3 277
  - 10 Paul James III – RJR 6'4 271
- Will Linebacker
  - 41 Montavius Atkinson – RFR 6'2 211
  - 17 TJ Neal – SR 6'2 238
  - 10 Paul James III – (injured)
- Mike Linebacker
  - 57 Deshaun Davis – RSO 5'11 238
  - 30 Tre' Williams – JR 6'2 236
  - 42 Tre Threat – FR 6'2 242
- Sam Linebacker
  - 49 Darrell Williams – SO 6'2 231
  - 46 Richard McBryde – RFR 6'2 226
  - 47 Cameron Toney – RJR 6'2 234
- Nickel
  - 23 Rudy Ford – SR 6'1 203
  - 15 Joshua Holsey – RSR 5'11 197
  - 41 Montravius Atkinson
- Boundary Corner
  - 6 Carlton Davis – SO 6'1196
  - 24 John Broussard – FR 5'9 172
  - 20 Jeremiah Dinson – SO 5'10 180
  - 18 Jayvaughn Myers – FR 6'1 176 (will redshirt)
- Free safety
  - 14 Stephen Roberts – JR 6'0 183
  - 23 Rudy Ford
  - ?? Daniel Thomas – FR 6'1 193
  - ?? Marlon Character – FR 6'0 185 (will redshirt)
- Strong safety
  - 28 Tray Matthews – RJR 6'2 207
  - 11 Markell Boston – RSO 6' 200
  - 13 TJ Davis – RSR 6'1 197
  - 48 Stephen Davis Jr. – FR 6'4 215 (injured)
- Field Corner
  - 12 Jamel Dean – RFR 6'3 210 (injured)
  - 31 Javaris Davis – RFR 5'10 182
  - 15 Josh Holsey – RSR
  - 22 Marshall Taylor – SR 6'3 191 (injured)
- Place kicker
  - 37 Daniel Carlson – RSO
  - 39 Ian Shannon – RFR
- Punter
  - 91 Kevin Phillips – RSR
  - 39 Ian Shannon
- Holder
  - 29 Tyler Stovall – JR
  - 5 John Franklin III
- Long snapper
  - Ike Powell
  - Zack Wade
  - Clarke Smith (walk on)
- Punt returner
  - 80 Marcus Davis
  - 83 Ryan Davis
- Kick returner
  - 23 Rudy Ford
  - 21 Kerryon Johnson
  - 9 Kamryn Martin
  - 10 Stanton Truitt

=== Spring game ===
The annual 'A-Day' was held on April 9. 45,723 fans came to see the Tigers perform, making this the lowest attendance for 'A-Day' in the Gus Malzahn era. The Blue team defeated the White team by the score of 19–10.

Auburn A-Day Game

Quarter	1	2	3	4	Total
White	0	10	0	0	10
Blue	3	9	7	0	19

at Jordan–Hare Stadium • Auburn, Alabama

- Date: April 9, 2016
- Game time: 3:00 p.m.
- Game weather: Temperature: 68 °F (20 °C) • Wind 6 mph (9.7 km/h) N • Weather: Sunny
- Game attendance: 45,723
- TV announcers (SEC Network): Dave Neal (play-by-play), Matt Stinchcomb (analyst), Maria Taylor (sideline reporter)

== Schedule ==
Auburn announced its 2016 football schedule on October 29, 2015, consisting of 8 home and 4 away games in the regular season. The Tigers hosted SEC foes Arkansas, LSU, Texas A&M, and Vanderbilt, and traveled to Alabama, Georgia, Mississippi State, and Ole Miss.

The Tigers hosted all four of their non–conference games: Alabama A&M from the Southwestern Athletic Conference, Arkansas State and Louisiana–Monroe from the Sun Belt Conference, and national title runner-up Clemson from the Atlantic Coast Conference. The 2016 season was the first season the Tigers played eight home games since 2013, when Auburn went 12–2 and appeared in the 2014 BCS National Championship Game.

Date	Time	Opponent	Rank	Site	TV	Result	Attendance
September 3	8:00 p.m.	No. 2 Clemson*		Jordan–Hare Stadium; Auburn, Alabama (rivalry)	ESPN	L 13–19	87,451
September 10	6:30 p.m.	Arkansas State*		Jordan–Hare Stadium; Auburn, Alabama	SECN	W 51–14	86,825
September 17	6:00 p.m.	No. 17 Texas A&M		Jordan–Hare Stadium; Auburn, Alabama	ESPN	L 16–29	87,175
September 24	5:00 p.m.	No. 18 LSU		Jordan–Hare Stadium; Auburn, Alabama (Tiger Bowl / SEC Nation)	ESPN	W 18–13	87,451
October 1	2:30 p.m.	Louisiana–Monroe*^{†}		Jordan–Hare Stadium; Auburn, Alabama	SECN	W 58–7	84,243
October 8	11:00 a.m.	at Mississippi State		Davis Wade Stadium; Starkville, Mississippi	ESPN	W 38–14	60,102
October 22	5:00 p.m.	No. 17 Arkansas	No. 21	Jordan–Hare Stadium; Auburn, Alabama	ESPN	W 56–3	87,451
October 29	6:15 p.m.	at Ole Miss	No. 15	Vaught–Hemingway Stadium; Oxford, Mississippi (rivalry)	SECN	W 40–29	65,927
November 5	11:00 a.m.	Vanderbilt	No. 9	Jordan–Hare Stadium; Auburn, Alabama	ESPN	W 23–16	87,451
November 12	2:30 p.m.	at Georgia	No. 9	Sanford Stadium; Athens, Georgia (Deep South's Oldest Rivalry)	CBS	L 7–13	92,746
November 19	6:30 p.m.	Alabama A&M*	No. 15	Jordan–Hare Stadium; Auburn, Alabama	SECN	W 55–0	87,451
November 26	2:30 p.m.	at No. 1 Alabama	No. 13	Bryant–Denny Stadium; Tuscaloosa, Alabama (Iron Bowl / SEC Nation)	CBS	L 12–30	101,821
January 2	7:30 p.m.	vs. No. 7 Oklahoma*	No. 14	Mercedes-Benz Superdome; New Orleans (Sugar Bowl)	ESPN	L 19–35	54,077
*Non-conference game; ^{†}Homecoming; Rankings from AP Poll and CFP Rankings after November 1 released prior to game; All times are in Central time

Schedule source:

== Game summaries ==
=== Clemson ===
#2 Clemson Tigers at Auburn Tigers − Game summary

Quarter	1	2	3	4	Total
#2 Clemson	0	10	3	6	19
Auburn	0	3	0	10	13

at Jordan–Hare Stadium • Auburn, Alabama

- Date: September 3, 2016
- Game time: 8:11 p.m.
- Game weather: Temperature: 79 °F (26 °C) • Wind E 5 mph (8.0 km/h) • Weather: Clear Skies
- Game attendance: 87,451
- Referee: Jeff Heaser
- TV announcers (ESPN): Brent Musburger (play-by-play), Jesse Palmer (analyst), Kaylee Hartung (sideline reporter)

Game information

Second Quarter

- AUB – Daniel Carlson 53 yd field goal, 12:58 (AUB 3–0)
- CLEM – Wayne Gallman 1 yd run (Greg Huegel kick), 7:34 (CLEM 7–3)
- CLEM – Greg Huegel 30 yd field goal, 0:07 (CLEM 10–3)

Third Quarter

- CLEM – Greg Huegel 40 yd field goal, 10:36 (CLEM 13–3)

Fourth Quarter

- AUB – Daniel Carlson 32 yd field goal, 13:46 (CLEM 13–6)
- CLEM – Hunter Renfrow 16 yd pass from Deshaun Watson (Greg Huegel PAT failed), 9:59 (CLEM 19–6)
- AUB – Kerryon Johnson 9 yd run (Daniel Carlson kick), 3:22 (CLEM 19–13)

Top Passers

- CLEM – Deshaun Watson 19–34, 248 yds, 1 TD, 1 INT
- AUB – Sean White 10–21, 140 yds, 1 INT

Top Rushers

- CLEM – Wayne Gallman 30 carries, 123 yds, 1 TD
- AUB – Kerryon Johnson 23 carries, 94 yds, 1 TD

Top Receiving

- CLEM – Mike Williams 9 receptions, 174 yds
- AUB – Marcus Davis 5 receptions, 56 yds

The Tigers opened the season with a home contest against the 2015 national runner-up Clemson. This is considered a rivalry game for both schools. Clemson came into the game ranked number 2 in the country while Auburn was unranked. Auburn took an early lead on a long field goal by Daniel Carlson. Clemson, however, responded with a drive of its own, which resulted in a touchdown on 4th down and goal from the 1-yard line. Clemson would lead 10–3 going into halftime and add another field goal in the 3rd quarter to make the score 13–3 going into the 4th quarter. Auburn cut the lead on another field goal by Daniel Carlson, but once again Clemson responded with another touchdown. Auburn would score a touchdown with just over 3 minutes to play in the ballgame. Auburn would then stop Clemson on the ensuing possession, but 2 hail mary attempts by Auburn were broken up in the end zone in the last 10 seconds of the ballgame and Clemson held on for the 19–13 victory. Auburn would fall to 0–1, making this the first opening game loss for Auburn with Gus Malzahn as coach.

=== Arkansas State ===
Arkansas State Red Wolves at Auburn Tigers − Game summary

Quarter	1	2	3	4	Total
Arkansas State	7	0	7	0	14
Auburn	14	24	10	3	51

at Jordan–Hare Stadium • Auburn, Alabama

- Date: September 10, 2016
- Game time: 6:39 p.m.
- Game weather: Temperature: 89 °F (32 °C) • Wind SW 6 mph (9.7 km/h) • Weather: Sunny
- Game attendance: 86,825
- Referee: Matt Loeffler
- TV announcers (SEC Network): Brent Musburger (play-by-play), Jesse Palmer (analyst), Jeannine Edwards (sideline reporter)

Game information

First Quarter

- AUB – Kerryon Johnson 47 yd run (Daniel Carlson kick), 6:58 (AUB 7–0)
- ASU – Chad Voytik 1 yd run (J.D. Houston kick), 4:27 (TIE 7–7)
- AUB – Kerryon Johnson 1 yd run (Daniel Carlson kick), 2:38 (AUB 14–7)

Second Quarter

- AUB – Tony Stevens 24 yd pass from Sean White (Daniel Carlson kick), 14:10 (AUB 21–7)
- AUB – Daniel Carlson 20 yd run (Daniel Carlson kick), 7:59 (AUB 28–7)
- AUB – Will Hastings 29 yd pass from Sean White (Daniel Carlson kick), 1:49 (AUB 35–7)
- AUB – Daniel Carlson 18 yd field goal, 0:00 (AUB 38–7)

Third Quarter

- AUB – Daniel Carlson 37 yd field goal, 11:26 (AUB 41–7)
- ASU – Chad Voytik 5 yd run (J.D. Houston kick), 5:05 (AUB 41–14)
- AUB – Tony Stevens 8 yd pass from Sean White (Daniel Carlson kick), 0:25 (AUB 48–14)

Fourth Quarter

- AUB – Daniel Carlson 42 yd field goal, 7:12 (AUB 51–14)

Top Passers

- ASU − Chad Voytik 15–21, 215 yds
- AUB − Sean White 17–23, 244 yds, 3 TD

Top Rushers

- ASU − Warren Wand 16 carries, 37 yds
- AUB − Kamryn Pettway 15 carries, 152 yds

Top Receiving

- ASU − Chris Booker 6 receptions, 92 yds
- AUB − Tony Stevens 4 receptions, 75 yds, 2 TD

The second game of the season was also the second non-conference opponent for the Tigers. They played Arkansas State out of the Sun Belt Conference. Auburn scored first but Arkansas State quickly answered with a long pass play that set up a touchdown to tie the game at 7. Auburn scored next and never looked back scoring 31 unanswered points. At halftime, the Tigers lead 38–7. The final score was 51–14. Sean White had 3 touchdowns, and the game was Auburn's best offensive performance, according to many writers, since the 2014 season. Overall, this was a very impressive victory for Auburn, and for Gus Malzahn, who used to coach at Arkansas State in 2012. Auburn also remains unbeaten against the Sun Belt Conference after this win.

=== Texas A&M ===
#17 Texas A&M Aggies at Auburn Tigers − Game summary

Quarter	1	2	3	4	Total
#17 Texas A&M	3	13	3	10	29
Auburn	7	3	0	6	16

at Jordan–Hare Stadium • Auburn, Alabama

- Date: September 17, 2016
- Game time: 6:11 p.m.
- Game weather: Temperature: 81 °F (27 °C) • Wind SW 2 mph (3.2 km/h) • Weather: Cloudy
- Game attendance: 87,175
- Referee: Matt Austin
- TV announcers (ESPN): Dave Flemming (play-by-play), Brian Griese (analyst), Todd McShay (sideline reporter)

Game information

First Quarter

- AUB – Kamryn Pettway 1 yd run (Daniel Carlson kick), 7:11 (AUB 7–0)
- TA&M – Daniel LaCamera 46 yd field goal, 1:42 (AUB 7–3)

Second Quarter

- TA&M – Josh Reynolds 5 yd pass from Trevor Knight (Daniel LaCamera kick), 12:07 (TAMU 10–7)
- TA&M – Daniel LaCamera 35 yd field goal, 5:38 (TAMU 13–7)
- TA&M – Daniel LaCamera 31 yd field goal, 1:52 (TAMU 16–7)
- AUB – Daniel Carlson 37 yd field goal, 0:00 (TAMU 16–10)

Third Quarter

- TA&M – Daniel LaCamera 25 yd field goal, 1:03 (TAMU 19–10)

Fourth Quarter

- TA&M – Daniel LaCamera 26 yd field goal, 10:13 (TAMU 22–10)
- TA&M – Trayveon Williams 89 yd run (Daniel LaCamera kick), 6:52 (TAMU 29–10)
- AUB – Kerryon Johnson 2 yd run (John Franklin pass failed), 2:59 (TAMU 29–16)

Top Passers

- TA&M − Trevor Knight 20–40, 247 yds, 1 TD
- AUB − Sean White 18–27, 126 yds

Top Rushers

- TA&M − Trayveon Williams 8 carries, 127 yds, 1 TD
- AUB − Kamryn Pettway 20 carries, 123 yds, 1 TD

Top Receiving

- TA&M − Josh Reynolds 7 receptions 98 yds
- AUB − Tony Stevens 8 receptions, 86 yds

The third game of the season is the first conference game for Auburn. SEC Western Division opponent Texas A&M comes to Auburn to play that game. Auburn beat the 25th ranked A&M last year 26–10. Auburn has yet to beat the Aggies at Auburn. Auburn has been out scored 104 to 59 at home by A&M.

=== LSU ===
#18 LSU Tigers at Auburn Tigers − Game summary

Quarter	1	2	3	4	Total
#18 LSU	7	0	6	0	13
Auburn	3	6	3	6	18

at Jordan–Hare Stadium • Auburn, Alabama

- Date: September 24, 2016
- Game time: 5:01 p.m.
- Game weather: Temperature: 91 °F (33 °C) • Wind NE 8 mph (13 km/h) • Weather: Partly Cloudy
- Game attendance: 87,451
- Referee: Hubert Owens
- TV announcers (ESPN): Mark Jones (play-by-play), Rod Gilmore (analyst), Quint Kessenich (sideline reporter)

Game information

First Quarter

- AUB – Daniel Carlson 51 yd field goal, 6:32 (AUB 3–0)
- LSU – Josh Reynolds 3 yd pass from Danny Etling (C. Delahoussaye kick), 2:47 (LSU 7–3)

Second Quarter

- AUB – Daniel Carlson 29 yd field goal, 12:19 (LSU 7–6)
- AUB – Daniel Carlson 29 yd field goal, 5:14 (AUB 9–7)

Third Quarter

- AUB – Daniel Carlson 31 yd field goal, 9:43 (AUB 12–7)
- LSU – C. Delahoussaye 29 yd field goal, 5:36 (AUB 12–10)
- LSU – C. Delahoussaye 25 yd field goal, 2:32 (LSU 13–12)

Fourth Quarter

- AUB – Daniel Carlson 37 yd field goal, 12:36 (AUB 15–13)
- AUB – Daniel Carlson 29 yd field goal, 2:56 (AUB 18–13)

Top Passers

- LSU − Danny Etling 15–27, 118 yds, 1 TD
- AUB − Sean White 19–26, 234 yds

Top Rushers

- LSU − Leonard Fournette 16 carries, 101 yds
- AUB − Kerryon Johnson 22 carries, 93 yds

Top Receiving

- LSU − Travin Dural 4 receptions 47 yds
- AUB − Ryan Davis 5 receptions, 31 yds

The fourth game of the season was a rivalry game against the LSU Tigers.

The game would end with a controversial win. After an illegal shift was called against LSU with one second to go, LSU would go on to score what was initially called a touchdown as time expired before being reviewed and determined that time expired prior to the snap, negating the touchdown and giving Auburn the 18–13 win.

This was Auburn's first SEC victory without scoring a touchdown since 2008, when they won 3–2 against Mississippi State. Daniel Carlson was 6–6 on field goals in the game, including a 51-yard field goal. Auburn held LSU star running back Leonard Fournette to less than half the yards they allowed him in 2015. It was Auburn's first home conference win since October 25, 2014 against South Carolina.

=== Louisiana–Monroe ===
Louisiana–Monroe Warhawks at Auburn Tigers − Game summary

Quarter	1	2	3	4	Total
Louisiana–Monroe	0	7	0	0	7
Auburn	14	14	28	2	58

at Jordan–Hare Stadium • Auburn, Alabama

- Date: October 1, 2016
- Game time: 2:31 p.m.
- Game weather: Temperature: 80 °F (27 °C) • Wind WSW 5 mph (8.0 km/h) • Weather: Sunny
- Game attendance: 84,243
- Referee: David Smith
- TV announcers (SEC Network Alternate): Taylor Zarzour (play-by-play), Jordan Rodgers (analyst), Lauren Sisler (sideline reporter)

Game information

First Quarter

- AUB – Sean White 3 yd run (Daniel Carlson kick), 8:42 (AUB 7–0)
- AUB – Kyle Davis 48 yd pass from Sean White (Daniel Carlson kick), 2:31 (AUB 14–0)

Second Quarter

- AUB – Kerryon Johnson 1 yd run (Daniel Carlson kick), 12:12 (AUB 21–0)
- AUB – Kerryon Johnson 2 yd run (Daniel Carlson kick), 4:05 (AUB 28–0)
- ULM – Marcus Green 2 yd pass from Garrett Smith (Craig Ford kick), 0:00 (AUB 28–7)

Third Quarter

- AUB – Tony Stevens 48 yd pass from Sean White (Daniel Carlson kick), 12:28 (AUB 35–7)
- AUB – Malik Miller 4 yd run (Daniel Carlson kick), 7:30 (AUB 42–7)
- AUB – John Franklin 80 yd run (Daniel Carlson kick), 5:09 (AUB 49–7)
- AUB – Nate Craig-Myers 39 yd pass from John Franklin (Daniel Carlson kick), 1:08 (AUB 56–7)

Fourth Quarter

- AUB – Gary Walker safety, 0:31 (AUB 58–7)

Top Passers

- ULM − Garrett Smith 19–33, 139 yds, 1 TD, 1 INT
- AUB − Sean White 14–17, 239 yds, 2 TD

Top Rushers

- ULM − Ben Luckett 11 carries, 31 yds
- AUB − Kerryon Johnson 24 carries, 146 yds, 2 TD

Top Receiving

- ULM − Marcus Green 7 receptions, 40 yds, 1 TD
- AUB − Ryan Davis 5 receptions, 56 yds

The fifth game of the season was the annual homecoming game. The Louisiana–Monroe Warhawks came to Auburn for their tenth game ever against the Tigers. The last time the Warhawks and the Tigers clashed, the result was a 31–28 Auburn victory in overtime back in the 2012 season. However, this one went very differently. Auburn dominated from the start. The Tigers had their highest point total since 59 versus San Jose State in 2014. The defense also allowed the fewest points since 3 against Western Carolina in 2013. Auburn improved to 3–2 to go over .500 for the first time in the season.

=== Mississippi State ===
Auburn Tigers at Mississippi State Bulldogs − Game summary

Quarter	1	2	3	4	Total
Auburn	14	21	0	3	38
Mississippi State	0	0	7	7	14

at Davis Wade Stadium • Starkville, Mississippi

- Date: October 8, 2016
- Game time: 11:02 a.m.
- Game weather: Temperature: 81 °F (27 °C) • Wind N 10 mph (16 km/h) • Weather: Sunny
- Game attendance: 60,102
- Referee: Brad Rogers
- TV announcers (ESPN): Tom Hart (play-by-play), Andre Ware (analyst), Cole Cubelic (sideline reporter)

Game information

First Quarter

- AUB – Ryan Davis 3 yd pass from Sean White (Daniel Carlson kick), 9:28 (AUB 7–0)
- AUB – Kamryn Pettway 1 yd run (Daniel Carlson kick), 3:44 (AUB 14–0)

Second Quarter

- AUB – Kamryn Pettway 3 yd run (Daniel Carlson kick), 12:15 (AUB 21–0)
- AUB – Kamryn Pettway 2 yd run (Daniel Carlson kick), 1:54 (AUB 28–0)
- AUB – Montravius Adams 13 yd fumble recovery (Daniel Carlson kick), 1:45 (AUB 35–0)

Third Quarter

- MSU – Keith Mixon 37 yd pass from Nick Fitzgerald (Westin Graves kick), 5:48 (AUB 35–7)

Fourth Quarter

- MSU – Fred Ross 8 yd pass from Nick Fitzgerald (Westin Graves kick), 10:14 (AUB 35–14)
- AUB – Daniel Carlson 25 yd field goal, 1:39 (AUB 38–14)

Top Passers

- AUB − Sean White 14–18, 204 yds, 1 TD, 1 INT
- MSU − Nick Fitzgerald 17–34, 181 yds, 2 TD, 1 INT

Top Rushers

- AUB − Kamryn Pettway 39 carries, 169 yds, 3 TD
- MSU − Nick Fitzgerald 17 carries, 61 yds

Top Receiving

- AUB − Tony Stevens 3 receptions, 64 yds
- MSU − Fred Ross 4 receptions, 29 yds, 1 TD

The sixth game of the season was the first road game for the Tigers. They played at Mississippi State where they had not won since 2010. However, Auburn easily won the game. After an early interception put the Bulldogs in good field position, the Tigers defense responded, holding Mississippi State to a field goal attempt that was no good. Auburn seized the momentum after that. Starting running back Kerryon Johnson got hurt early in the game, but Kamryn Pettway took over the game with a 169-yard performance including 3 touchdowns. Also, the Auburn defense scored a touchdown when Carl Lawson forced a fumble which was picked up by Montravius Adams and returned 13 yards for a touchdown. Auburn led 35–0 at halftime. The Tigers slowed down in the second half, only attempting one pass on offense. The final score was 38–14. It broke a two-game losing streak to the Bulldogs and improved Auburn's record to 4–2 and 2–1 in the SEC. The win also propelled Auburn into the AP Poll the next week, as the Tigers were ranked #23.

=== Arkansas ===
#17 Arkansas Razorbacks at #21 Auburn Tigers − Game summary

Quarter	1	2	3	4	Total
#17 Arkansas	0	3	0	0	3
#21 Auburn	21	7	14	14	56

at Jordan–Hare Stadium • Auburn, Alabama

- Date: October 22, 2016
- Game time: 5:01 p.m.
- Game weather: Temperature: 67 °F (19 °C) • Wind NW 10 mph (16 km/h) • Weather: Sunny
- Game attendance: 87,451
- Referee: Ken Williamson
- TV announcers (ESPN): Joe Tessitore (play-by-play), Todd Blackledge (analyst), Holly Rowe (sideline reporter)

Game information

First Quarter

- AUB – Eli Stove 78 yd run (Daniel Carlson kick), 11:00 (AUB 7–0)
- AUB – Kamryn Pettway 9 yd run (Daniel Carlson kick), 3:00 (AUB 14–0)
- AUB – Stanton Truitt 20 yd run (Daniel Carlson kick), 0:57 (AUB 21–0)

Second Quarter

- AUB – Stanton Truitt 45 yd pass from Sean White (Daniel Carlson kick), 1:28 (AUB 28–0)
- ARK – Adam McFain 54 yd field goal, 0:00 (AUB 28–3)

Third Quarter

- AUB – Sean White 1 yd run, 6:06 (AUB 35–3)
- AUB – Kamryn Pettway 23 yd run (Daniel Carlson kick), 0:42 (AUB 42–3)

Fourth Quarter

- AUB – Stanton Truitt 32 yd run (Daniel Carlson kick), 12:25 (AUB 49–3)
- AUB – Kam Martin 51 yd run (Daniel Carlson kick), 4:27 (AUB 56–3)

Top Passers

- ARK − Austin Allen 17–30, 187 yds, 1 INT
- AUB − Sean White 6–11, 77 yds, 1 TD

Top Rushers

- ARK − Rawleigh Williams 13 carries, 22 yds
- AUB − Kamryn Pettway 27 carries, 192 yds, 2 TD

Top Receiving

- ARK − Keon Hatcher 7 receptions, 87 yds
- AUB − Ryan Davis 3 receptions, 15 yds

After their only bye week of the season, Auburn played Arkansas in the seventh game of the year. In the 2015 season, the Tigers lost a heartbreaker in Fayetteville, falling 54–46 in four overtimes. The Tigers avenged that loss in a very big way, dominating the Razorbacks from the start. The Tigers had over 500 yards of rushing, the Razorbacks only had 25. It was Auburn's biggest margin of victory over an SEC opponent since 1970. The Tigers also built their lead in the overall series, now leading it 14–11–1.

=== Ole Miss ===
#15 Auburn Tigers at Ole Miss Rebels − Game summary

Quarter	1	2	3	4	Total
#15 Auburn	10	10	7	13	40
Ole Miss	13	9	7	0	29

at Vaught–Hemingway Stadium • Oxford, Mississippi

- Date: October 29, 2016
- Game time: 6:25 p.m.
- Game weather: Temperature: 74 °F (23 °C) • Wind: Calm • Weather: Clear
- Game attendance: 65,927
- Referee: John McDaid
- TV announcers (SEC Network): Brent Musburger (play-by-play), Jesse Palmer (analyst), Kaylee Hartung (sideline reporter)

Game information

First Quarter

- MISS – Evan Engram 15 yd pass from Chad Kelly (Gary Wunderlich kick blocked), 11:12 (MISS 6–0)
- AUB − Kamryn Pettway 41 yd run (Daniel Carlson kick), 7:27 (AUB 7–6)
- MISS − DeMarkus Lodge 26 yd pass from Chad Kelly (Gary Wunderlich kick), 5:36 (MISS 13–7)
- AUB − Daniel Carlson 45 yd field goal, 1:50 (MISS 13–10)

Second Quarter

- MISS − Gary Wunderlich 20 yd field goal, 14:14 (MISS 16–10)
- AUB – Kerryon Johnson 1 yd run (Daniel Carlson kick), 12:33 (AUB 17–16)
- MISS – Gary Wunderlich 49 yd field goal, 7:10 (MISS 19–17)
- AUB – Daniel Carlson 32 yd field goal, 2:50 (AUB 20–19)
- MISS – Gary Wunderlich 26 yd field goal, 0:05 (MISS 22–20)

Third Quarter

- AUB – Jalen Harris 15 yd pass from Sean White (Daniel Carlson kick), 3:11 (AUB 27–22)
- MISS – Damore'ea Stringfellow 10 yd pass from Chad Kelly (Gary Wunderlich kick), 1:30 (MISS 29–27)

Fourth Quarter

- AUB – Daniel Carlson 30 yd field goal, 12:25 (AUB 30–29)
- AUB – Daniel Carlson 47 yd field goal, 8:13 (AUB 33–29)
- AUB – Kerryon Johnson 3 yd run (Daniel Carlson kick), 5:58 (AUB 40–29)

Top Passers

- AUB − Sean White 15–22, 247 yds, 1 TD
- MISS − Chad Kelly 36–59, 465 yds, 3 TD, 1 INT

Top Rushers

- AUB − Kamryn Pettway 30 carries, 236 yds, 1 TD
- MISS − Chad Kelly 11 carries, 40 yds

Top Receiving

- AUB − Eli Stove 5 receptions, 37 yds
- MISS − Evan Engram 9 receptions, 95 yds, 1 TD

The eighth game of the season was a trip to Oxford, Mississippi to face Ole Miss. In an offensive shootout, Ole Miss quarterback Chad Kelly set the Ole Miss school record for most passing attempt and most passing yards in a single game. However, Auburn had just as much success rushing as Ole Miss had passing. Kamryn Pettway had a career-high 236 yards. The key play came late in the game with Auburn leading 33–29 and Ole Miss driving down the field for the go-ahead touchdown. Ole Miss tight end Evan Engram dropped a pass which would have likely resulted in a touchdown. On the next play, Auburn defender Josh Holsey intercepted quarterback Chad Kelly's pass and returned it the Ole Miss 30 yard line. That set up a Kerryon Johnson touchdown that made it a two possession game, ultimately sealing the win for Auburn. Auburn became bowl eligible with their 6th win of the year. Auburn now leads the overall series 30–11–0.

=== Vanderbilt ===
Vanderbilt Commodores at #11 Auburn Tigers − Game summary

Quarter	1	2	3	4	Total
Vanderbilt	3	10	0	3	16
#11 Auburn	7	3	10	3	23

at Jordan–Hare Stadium • Auburn, Alabama

- Date: November 5, 2016
- Game time: 11:01 a.m.
- Game attendance: 87,451
- Referee: James Carter
- TV announcers (ESPN): Mike Patrick (play-by-play), Ed Cunningham (analyst), Jerry Punch (sideline reporter)

Game information

First Quarter
Second Quarter
Third Quarter
Fourth Quarter

Top Passers

- VAN −
- AUB −

Top Rushers

- VAN −
- AUB −

Top Receiving

- VAN −
- AUB −

The ninth game of the season is against SEC Eastern Division opponent Vanderbilt. The last game, which was in the 2012 season, was a 17–13 Vanderbilt victory. Vanderbilt leads the all-time series 21–20–1.

=== Georgia ===
#8 Auburn Tigers at Georgia Bulldogs − Game summary

Quarter	1	2	3	4	Total
#8 Auburn	7	0	0	0	7
Georgia	0	0	7	6	13

at Sanford Stadium • Athens, Georgia

- Date: November 12, 2016
- Game time: 2:30 p.m.
- Referee: Ken Williamson
- TV announcers (CBS): Verne Lundquist (play-by-play), Gary Danielson (analyst), Allie LaForce (sideline reporter)

Game information

First Quarter
Second Quarter
Third Quarter
Fourth Quarter

Top Passers

- AUB −
- UGA −

Top Rushers

- AUB −
- UGA −

Top Receiving

- AUB −
- UGA −

The tenth game of the year is the annual Deep South's Oldest Rivalry game against Georgia. In the last meeting, Georgia won by the score of 20–13 in the 2015 season. Georgia has a slim lead in the series, which has been played since 1892, 56–55–8.

=== Alabama A&M ===
Alabama A&M Bulldogs at #15 Auburn Tigers − Game summary

Quarter	1	2	3	4	Total
Alabama A&M	0	0	0	0	0
#15 Auburn	14	10	24	7	55

at Jordan–Hare Stadium • Auburn, Alabama

- Date: November 19, 2016
- Game time: 6:30 p.m.
- Referee: David Smith
- TV announcers (SEC Network Alternate): Taylor Zarzour (play-by-play), Clint Stoerner (analyst), Lauren Sisler (sideline reporter)

Game information

First Quarter
Second Quarter
Third Quarter
Fourth Quarter

Top Passers

- AA&M −
- AUB −

Top Rushers

- AA&M −
- AUB −

Top Receiving

- AA&M −
- AUB −

The eleventh game will be the final home game for Auburn making it Senior Night. Alabama A&M and Auburn have only played once before with the Tigers winning that game 51–7 in the 2012 season. That win gave the Tigers the overall series lead of 1–0–0.

=== Alabama ===
#13 Auburn Tigers at #1 Alabama Crimson Tide − Game summary

Quarter	1	2	3	4	Total
#13 Auburn	3	6	3	0	12
#1 Alabama	10	3	14	3	30

at Bryant–Denny Stadium • Tuscaloosa, Alabama

- Date: November 26, 2016
- Game time: 2:30 p.m.
- Referee: John McDaid
- TV announcers (CBS): Verne Lundquist (play-by-play), Gary Danielson (analyst), Allie LaForce (sideline reporter)

Game information

First Quarter
Second Quarter
Third Quarter
Fourth Quarter

Top Passers

- AUB −
- ALA −

Top Rushers

- AUB −
- ALA −

Top Receiving

- AUB −
- ALA −

The final game of the regular season is the annual Iron Bowl clash with Alabama. In the last meeting, which was in the 2015 season, Alabama won 29–13 on their way to a national championship. Alabama leads the all-time series 44–35–1. Auburn has not beat Alabama in Tuscaloosa since 2010.

=== Oklahoma ===
2017 Sugar Bowl
#17 Auburn Tigers vs. #7 Oklahoma Sooners – Game summary

Quarter	1	2	3	4	Total
#17 Auburn	7	6	0	6	19
#7 Oklahoma	0	14	14	7	35

at Mercedes-Benz Superdome • New Orleans

- Date: January 2, 2017
- Game time: 7:30 p.m.
- Game weather: Indoors
- Referee: John O'Neill
- TV announcers (ESPN): Brent Musburger (play-by-play), Jesse Palmer (analyst), Kaylee Hartung (sideline reporter)

Game information

First Quarter
Second Quarter
Third Quarter
Fourth Quarter

Top Passers

- AUB –
- OKLA –

Top Rushers

- AUB –
- OKLA –

Top Receiving

- AUB –
- OKLA –

The Tigers were selected for the Sugar Bowl to play Oklahoma. The Sugar Bowl usually takes the highest-ranked SEC team, but because the SEC champion, Alabama, was in the playoff, the Sugar Bowl chose Auburn. It will be the first time Auburn and Oklahoma have played since the 1972 Sugar Bowl, for the 1971 season. The Sooners won that game 40–22 and thus have a 1–0–0 series lead.

== Rankings ==
Ranking movements Legend: ██ Increase in ranking ██ Decrease in ranking — = Not ranked RV = Received votes
	Week															
Poll	Pre	1	2	3	4	5	6	7	8	9	10	11	12	13	14	Final
AP	RV	RV	RV	—	RV	RV	23	21	15	11	8	18	16	18	17	24
Coaches	RV	RV	RV	RV	RV	RV	RV	24	17	12	8	16	15	19	17	22
CFP	Not released									9	9	15	13	14	14	Not released
