= Kerryon Johnson =

American football player (born 1997)

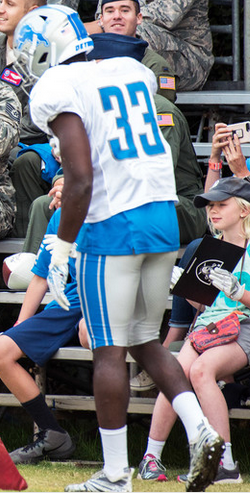
- Johnson with the Detroit Lions in 2018

East Tennessee State Buccaneers
- Title: Running backs coach

Personal information
- Born: June 30, 1997 (age 29); Huntsville, Alabama, U.S.
- Listed height: 5 ft 11 in (1.80 m)
- Listed weight: 211 lb (96 kg)

Career information
- High school: Madison Academy (Madison, Alabama)
- College: Auburn (2015–2017)
- NFL draft: 2018: 2nd round, 43rd overall pick

Career history

Playing
- Detroit Lions (2018–2020); Philadelphia Eagles (2021)*; San Francisco 49ers (2021); Philadelphia Eagles (2021)*
- * Offseason or practice squad member only

Coaching
- North Alabama (2023) Director of player development; North Alabama (2024) Running backs coach; East Tennessee State (2025–present) Running backs coach

Awards and highlights
- SEC Offensive Player of the Year (2017); First-team All-SEC (2017)

Career NFL statistics
- Rushing yards: 1,225
- Rushing average: 4.3
- Rushing touchdowns: 8
- Receptions: 61
- Receiving yards: 527
- Receiving touchdowns: 3
- Stats at Pro Football Reference

Kerryon Johnson (born June 30, 1997) is an American football coach and former running back, who is the running backs coach at East Tennessee State University. He played college football for the Auburn Tigers and was selected by the Detroit Lions in the second round of the 2018 NFL draft.

== Early life ==
Johnson attended Madison Academy in Madison, Alabama. While there, he played on the Mustangs high school football team. As a senior, he rushed 1,659 yards with 25 touchdowns. He earned 2015 Alabama Mr. Football. He committed to Auburn University to play college football. Johnson had offers from Auburn, Alabama, Clemson, Florida State, LSU, North Carolina, Ole Miss, Mississippi State, South Carolina, and USC. He ultimately chose to attend Auburn.

== College career ==
As a freshman at Auburn in 2015, Johnson was a backup to future NFL starter Peyton Barber and Jovon Robinson, and never reached 10 rushes or 40 rushing yards in a game, though he was used occasionally as a kick returner and reached 161 all-purpose yards against Kentucky. On the year, he rushed 208 yards on 52 carries with three touchdowns. As a sophomore in 2016, he began the season starting six games, before becoming the backup to Kamryn Pettway, recording 895 rushing yards on 182 carries and 11 touchdowns. He had six touchdowns and 512 rushing yards through his first five games, averaged eight carries for 33 yards and one touchdown through the next three as a backup, returned to form with games of 99 and 108 yards and a touchdown each in relief, before ending the season with a 39-yard game against #1 Alabama in the Iron Bowl, and a 33-yard game in the Sugar Bowl loss to Oklahoma, though he did throw for a touchdown in the contest.

As a junior in 2017, Johnson became the Tigers' dominant rusher, with almost three times as many carries as any other player on the team. He rushed for over 100 yards in ten of the team's twelve regular season contests, including 204 yards and three touchdowns against Ole Miss, 233 yards-from-scrimmage and a touchdown in a win over #1 Georgia, and 104 yards with both a rushing and a passing touchdown in a signature victory over #1 Alabama in the regular season finale. However, the #2 Tigers lost 28–7 the Southeastern Conference (SEC) Championship in a rematch with Georgia, where Johnson was limited to 44 yards. In the subsequent Peach Bowl, Johnson had 71 rushing yards and a touchdown in the loss to #10 Central Florida. On the season, he recorded 1,391 yards (sixth best season in school history) on 285 carries for 18 rushing touchdowns (third) and 20 total touchdowns, leading the SEC in all four categories. At the conclusion of the season, Johnson was named the SEC offensive player of the year. He ended his career at Auburn with 2,494 career rushing yards (11th in school history), 32 rushing touchdowns (tied for fourth). On January 2, 2018, Johnson announced that he would forgo his senior year and enter the 2018 NFL draft.

== Professional career ==
Pre-draft measurables
Height	Weight	Arm length	Hand span	40-yard dash	10-yard split	20-yard split	20-yard shuttle	Three-cone drill	Vertical jump	Broad jump	Bench press
5 ft 11 1/2 in (1.82 m)	213 lb (97 kg)	32 1/2 in (0.83 m)	9 3/4 in (0.25 m)	4.52 s	1.63 s	2.66 s	4.29 s	7.07 s	40 in (1.02 m)	10 ft 6 in (3.20 m)	11 reps
All values from NFL Combine

=== Detroit Lions ===
Johnson was selected by the Detroit Lions in the second round (43rd overall) of the 2018 NFL draft. He was the sixth running back to be selected that year. He made his NFL debut in the season opener against the New York Jets on Monday Night Football. In the 48–17 loss, he had five carries for 17 yards and three receptions for 20 yards. In a 26–10 Sunday Night Football victory over the New England Patriots in Week 3, Johnson rushed for 101 yards, becoming the first Lions' player since Reggie Bush in 2013 to rush for more than 100 yards. The performance won him the starting role over LeGarrette Blount, which he used to score his first NFL touchdown the following week against the Dallas Cowboys though he was limited to just nine carries. He added 70 yards against the Green Bay Packers before the Week 6 bye. In Week 7 against the Miami Dolphins, Johnson rushed for 158 yards on 19 carries with an additional 21 yards on two catches in a 32–21 victory. Nearly half of his rushing yards came on a 71-yard carry early in the game. He was second-youngest Lions' player to reach 150 yards rushing by just three days to Barry Sanders, and the first Lions' player of any age since Jahvid Best in 2011. He expanded his role in the passing game with career bests of six receptions for 69 yards in Week 8, and after just 43 yards-from-scrimmage in Week 9, notched both a rushing and his first career receiving touchdown in Week 10 loss to the Chicago Bears. In the Week 11 win over the Carolina Panthers, Johnson had 87 yards and a rushing touchdown before spraining his left knee in the third quarter and missed the next four games. He was placed on injured reserve on December 19, 2018.

In Week 2 of the 2019 season against the Los Angeles Chargers, Johnson rushed 12 times for 41 yards and caught two passes for 47 yards and a touchdown as the Lions won 13–10. In Week 4 against the Kansas City Chiefs, Johnson rushed 26 times for 125 yards and caught two passes for 32 yards in the 34–30 loss. He was placed on injured reserve on October 22, 2019, after undergoing knee surgery. He was designated for return from injured reserve on December 4, 2019, and began practicing with the team again. He was activated on December 21, 2019, prior to Week 16. Overall, in the 2019 season, Johnson finished with 403 rushing yards and three rushing touchdowns to go along with 10 receptions for 127 receiving yards and one receiving touchdown.

On May 6, 2021, Johnson was waived by the Lions.

=== Philadelphia Eagles (first stint) ===
On May 7, 2021, Johnson was claimed off waivers by the Philadelphia Eagles. On August 17, 2021, he was waived by the Eagles with an injury designation and placed on injured reserve. He was released on August 26.

=== San Francisco 49ers ===
On September 14, 2021, Johnson was signed to the practice squad of the San Francisco 49ers. He was released on October 5.

=== Philadelphia Eagles (second stint) ===
Following Miles Sanders suffering a broken bone in his hand and Jordan Howard suffering a stinger, Johnson was signed to the Eagles practice squad on December 28. He was released on January 10, 2022.

== Career statistics ==
=== NFL ===
Year	Team	Games		Rushing					Receiving					Fumbles	
Year	Team	GP	GS	Att	Yds	Avg	Lng	TD	Rec	Yds	Avg	Lng	TD	Fum	Lost
2018	DET	10	7	118	641	5.4	71	3	32	213	6.7	24	1	1	1
2019	DET	8	8	113	403	3.6	20	3	10	127	12.7	36	1	1	1
2020	DET	16	2	52	181	3.5	14	2	19	187	9.8	20	1	1	1
2021	SF	1	0	0	0	0	0	0	0	0	0	0	0	0	0
Total		35	17	283	1,225	4.3	71	8	61	527	8.6	36	3	3	3

=== College ===
Season	Team	GP	Rushing				Receiving			
Season	Team	GP	Att	Yds	Avg	TD	Rec	Yds	Avg	TD
2015	Auburn	12	52	208	4.0	3	14	159	11.4	0
2016	Auburn	12	182	895	4.9	11	17	125	7.4	0
2017	Auburn	12	285	1,391	4.9	18	24	194	8.1	2
Career		36	519	2,494	4.8	32	55	478	8.7	2

== Coaching career ==
In June 2023, he was announced as the Director of Player Development at North Alabama. In 2024, he was made the team's running backs coach.

On April 17, 2025, East Tennessee State head coach Will Healy announced he had hired Johnson to coach running backs for the Buccaneers.

== Personal life ==
Johnson and former MTV's The Real World: San Diego (2011 season) and The Challenge cast member Ashley Kelsey welcomed their first daughter, Snoh Marie Johnson, on June 8, 2021.
