= John Franklin III =

American football player (born 1994)

Profile
- Position: Wide receiver

Personal information
- Born: September 21, 1994 (age 32); Fort Lauderdale, Florida, U.S.
- Listed height: 6 ft 1 in (1.85 m)
- Listed weight: 186 lb (84 kg)

Career information
- High school: South Plantation (Plantation, Florida)
- College: Florida State (2013–2014); East Mississippi CC (2015); Auburn (2016); Florida Atlantic (2017)
- NFL draft: 2018: undrafted

Career history
- Chicago Bears (2018–2019)*; Tampa Bay Buccaneers (2019–2020); Tampa Bay Bandits (2022); Memphis Showboats (2023); Edmonton Elks (2024)
- * Offseason or practice squad member only

Awards and highlights
- Super Bowl champion (LV); BCS national champion (2013)

Career NFL statistics
- Rushing yards: 11
- Rushing average: 11
- Stats at Pro Football Reference

John Franklin III (born September 21, 1994) is an American professional football wide receiver. He played college football for the Florida State Seminoles, Auburn Tigers and Florida Atlantic Owls. He also played junior college football for the East Mississippi Lions, where he was featured prominently in the first season of Last Chance U. He was signed by the Chicago Bears as an undrafted free agent in 2018.

== College career ==
Before college, Franklin attended South Plantation High School in Fort Lauderdale, Florida. Franklin redshirted the 2013 season while playing for the Florida State Seminoles. The Seminoles won the 2014 BCS National Championship Game against the Auburn Tigers. Franklin saw limited action in 2014. He was a member of the ACC champion 4×100 relay team at Florida State.

=== East Mississippi Community College ===
After the 2014 season, Franklin transferred to East Mississippi Community College. With the Lions, Franklin served mostly as a backup quarterback to Wyatt Roberts, as they won the MACJC North title. He only started on one occasion, against the Copiah–Lincoln Wolves, but ended up being pulled in favor of Roberts. On October 22, 2015, Franklin scored five rushing touchdowns and one passing touchdown against the Mississippi Delta Trojans, before the game was called off after a brawl broke out between both sides. The 2015 football season was documented in the Netflix series Last Chance U in 2016. On the year, Franklin made 64-of-110 receptions (58.2%) while throwing for 733 yards along with a 7–2 touchdown to interception ratio. He also added 451 yards on the ground on only 43 attempts, giving him an average of 10.5 yards per carry on his way to 9 rushing touchdowns.

=== Auburn ===
Franklin enrolled at Auburn University for his junior year, where he appeared in 12 games, while making one start with the Tigers. In his 12 games, he went 14-of-26 receptions (53.8%) while throwing for 204 yards along with one touchdown. On the ground, he added 430 yards on only 46 carries giving him an average of 9.3 yards per carry, also adding two touchdowns. He grew increasingly unhappy with his role on the team and on March 8, 2017, ESPN reported he was moving to wide receiver for the 2017 season.

=== Florida Atlantic ===
On August 15, 2017, he transferred to Florida Atlantic University to play for the Owls under head coach Lane Kiffin, as a graduate transfer. He had 16 rushes for 229 yards with an average of 14.3 yards per carry while rushing for two touchdowns. He also caught seven balls for 95 yards and one touchdown while averaging 13.6 yards a catch. He also went 1-of-2 (50%) for 49 yards.

At FAU's Pro Day in March 2018, Franklin was timed as running a 4.40 second 40-yard dash.

=== College statistics ===
Season	Team	Games			Passing								Rushing				Receiving			
Season	Team	GP	GS	Record (Note: Accounts for only GS as a QB)	Cmp	Att	Pct	Yds	Y/A	TD	Int	Rtg	Att	Yds	Avg	TD	Rec	Yds	Avg	TD
2013	Florida State	0	0	—	Redshirt															
2014	Florida State	2	0	—	Did not record any statistics															
2015	East Mississippi CC	9	1	0–1	64	110	58.2	733	6.7	7	2	131.5	43	451	10.5	9	—	—	—	—
2016	Auburn	13	1	1–0	14	26	53.8	204	7.8	1	0	132.4	46	430	9.3	2	1	-3	-3.0	0
2017	Florida Atlantic	13	2	—	1	2	50.0	49	24.5	0	0	255.8	16	229	14.3	2	7	95	13.6	1
FBS Career		28	4	1–0	15	28	53.6	254	9.0	1	0	141.3	62	659	10.6	4	8	92	11.5	1
NJCAA Career		9	1	0–1	64	110	58.2	733	6.7	7	2	131.5	43	451	10.5	9	0	0	0.0	0

== Professional career ==
Pre-draft measurables
Height	Weight	Arm length	Hand span	Wingspan	40-yard dash	10-yard split	20-yard split	20-yard shuttle	Three-cone drill	Vertical jump	Broad jump
6 ft 0 1/2 in (1.84 m)	184 lb (83 kg)	31 1/2 in (0.80 m)	8 1/2 in (0.22 m)	6 ft 3 in (1.91 m)	4.44 s	1.59 s	2.59 s	4.58 s	7.38 s	32.0 in (0.81 m)	10 ft 8 in (3.25 m)
All values from Pro Day

=== Chicago Bears ===
After going undrafted in the 2018 NFL draft, Franklin attended the Chicago Bears' rookie mini camp on a tryout basis as a defensive back. On May 14, 2018, Franklin was signed by the Bears as an undrafted free agent. On September 1, he was waived by the Bears. He was re-signed to the practice squad on September 27, but was released later that day. On November 24, Franklin returned to Chicago's practice squad. On January 8, 2019, he signed a reserve/future contract with the Bears, and was waived during final roster cuts on August 31.

In October 2019, Franklin was selected by the Dallas Renegades in the 2020 XFL draft, but did not sign with the league.

=== Tampa Bay Buccaneers ===
On November 13, 2019, Franklin was signed to the Tampa Bay Buccaneers' practice squad. He was promoted to the active roster on December 24, where he was listed as a wide receiver.

Franklin was placed on injured reserve on August 23, 2020, after suffering a leg injury during training camp. On February 7, 2021, he won a Super Bowl with the Buccaneers, even though he did not play a single snap for the entire season. He was waived on August 17.

On December 2, while still a free agent, he was suspended for three games by the NFL for "misrepresenting [his] COVID-19 vaccination status".

=== Tampa Bay Bandits ===
Franklin was selected by the Tampa Bay Bandits in the 17th round of the 2022 USFL draft. He was transferred to the team's practice squad on April 16, 2022, and back to the active roster two days later.

=== Memphis Showboats ===
Franklin and all other Tampa Bay Bandits players were all transferred to the Memphis Showboats after it was announced that the Bandits were taking a hiatus and that the Showboats were joining the league. He was placed on the team's injured reserve list on April 27, 2023. He was not part of the roster after the 2024 UFL dispersal draft on January 15, 2024.

=== Edmonton Elks ===
On February 21, 2024, Franklin signed with the Edmonton Elks of the Canadian Football League (CFL). Coincidentally, Franklin became teammates with quarterback Malik Henry, who appeared in the third and fourth seasons of Last Chance U. He was released on June 3.

== Personal life ==
Franklin is married to his wife Frankie Taylor, with whom he has a son.
