= 2017 Sugar Bowl =

2017 Allstate Sugar Bowl
- CFP New Year’s Six; 83rd Sugar Bowl
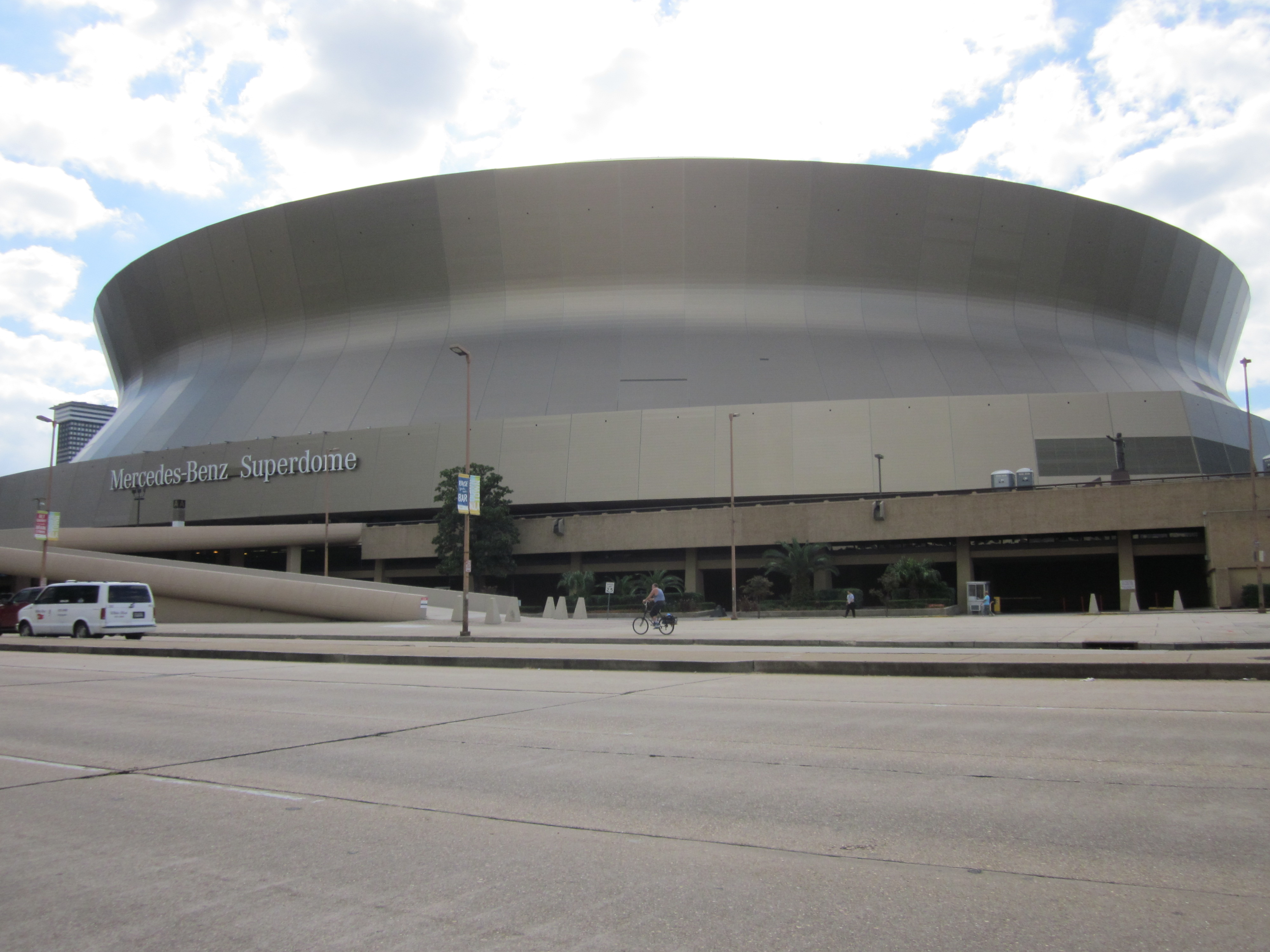
- The Mercedes-Benz Superdome in New Orleans, Louisiana, hosted the Sugar Bowl.
Auburn Tigers	Oklahoma Sooners
(8–4)	(10–2)
SEC	Big 12
19	35
Head coach: Gus Malzahn	Head coach: Bob Stoops
AP / Coaches / CFP; 17 / 17 / 14	AP / Coaches / CFP; 7 / 7 / 7
	1	2	3	4	Total
Auburn	7	6	0	6	19
Oklahoma	0	14	14	7	35
- Date: January 2, 2017
- Season: 2016
- Stadium: Mercedes-Benz Superdome
- Location: New Orleans, Louisiana
- MVP: Baker Mayfield (QB, Oklahoma)
- Favorite: Oklahoma by 3
- National anthem: Cast members of The Lion King
- Referee: John O'Neill (Big Ten)
- Attendance: 54,077

United States TV coverage
- Network: ESPN
- Announcers: Brent Musburger, Jesse Palmer and Kaylee Hartung (ESPN)
- Nielsen ratings: 5.6 (9.5 million viewers)

The 2017 Sugar Bowl is a bowl game that was played on January 2, 2017 at the Mercedes-Benz Superdome in New Orleans, Louisiana. This 83rd Sugar Bowl was played between a team from the Big 12 Conference and the Southeastern Conference. It is one of the 2016–17 bowl games that concluded the 2016 FBS football season. Sponsored by the Allstate insurance company, the game is officially known as the Allstate Sugar Bowl. The game was notable as Oklahoma's last under longtime head coach Bob Stoops prior to his retirement.

== Teams ==
The two teams were selected by the College Football Playoff committee on December 4, 2016. The highest-ranked team from the SEC and the Big 12 were to be selected. However, the highest-ranked team from the SEC, Alabama, was selected in the semifinals of the playoff, so the second highest ranked SEC team went in their place. Auburn was the second highest ranked team at 14th in the playoff rankings, so they were selected for the Sugar Bowl. Oklahoma was the Big 12 champion and the conference's highest ranked at 7th, therefore sending the Sooners to the Sugar Bowl.

This was the second meeting between the two schools; the previous meeting was the 1972 Sugar Bowl, which saw the Sooners defeat the Tigers by a score of 40–22.

=== Auburn ===
After a disappointing 2015 season, Auburn coach Gus Malzahn was considered to be at risk of losing his job if a similar season followed. The season started out poorly for the Tigers, as they started 1–2, with both losses coming to nationally-ranked teams. However, in week 4, the Tigers played rival LSU. LSU was #18 heading into the game, but it was Auburn that won 18–13. That started a six-game win streak that put the Tigers into the national Top 10. Towards the end of the season, injuries began to plague the Tigers, and they lost 2 of their final 3 games. However, losses by Tennessee and Florida sent the Tigers to the Sugar Bowl.

=== Oklahoma ===
Oklahoma made the playoff in the 2015 season, and many experts expected them to compete for another playoff berth. However, much like Auburn, the Sooners started 1–2, with both losses coming against nationally-ranked opponents. That start ended any hope of going back to the playoff. In the annual rivalry game against Texas, the Sooners won a close and hard-fought victory over the Longhorns, which started a turnaround and a nine-game win streak for the Sooners. Included in that win streak was a win against Oklahoma State which gave the Sooners the Big 12 championship and the Sugar Bowl berth.

== Game summary ==
2017 Sugar Bowl

Quarter	1	2	3	4	Total
No. 14 Auburn	7	6	0	6	19
No. 7 Oklahoma	0	14	14	7	35

at Mercedes-Benz Superdome • New Orleans, Louisiana

- Date: January 2, 2017
- Game time: 8:30 p.m. EST (7:30 p.m. CST)
- Game weather: n/a (game played indoors)
- Game attendance: 54,077
- Referee: John O'Neill (Big Ten)
- TV announcers (ESPN): Brent Musburger (play-by-play), Jesse Palmer (color) and Kaylee Hartung (sideline)
- ESPN game summary

Game information

First quarter
Second quarter
Third quarter
Fourth quarter

=== Statistics ===
Statistics	AUB	OKLA
First downs	30	36
Plays–yards	73–339	71–524
Rushes–yards	185	228
Passing yards	154	296
Passing: comp–att–int	13–27–1	19–28–0
Time of possession	26:42	33:18

Team	Category	Player	Statistics
AUB	Passing	Jeremy Johnson	5/9, 93 yards, 1 INT
AUB	Rushing	Kamryn Pettway	24 car, 101 yds
AUB	Receiving	Darius Slayton	1 rec, 56 yds
OKLA	Passing	Baker Mayfield	19/28, 296 yards, 2 TD
OKLA	Rushing	Joe Mixon	19 car, 91 yds, 2 TD
OKLA	Receiving	Joe Mixon	5 rec, 89 yds
