= Braden Smith (American football) =

American football player (born 1996)

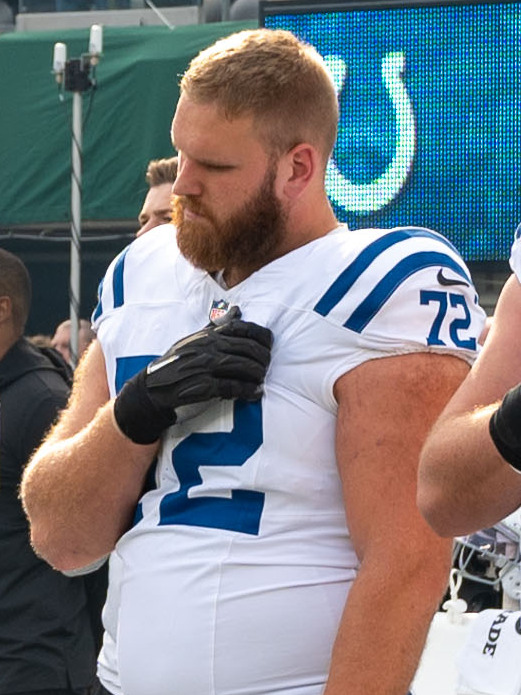
- Smith with the Indianapolis Colts in 2024

No. 71 – Houston Texans
- Position: Offensive tackle
- Roster status: Active

Personal information
- Born: March 25, 1996 (age 30); Olathe, Kansas, U.S.
- Listed height: 6 ft 6 in (1.98 m)
- Listed weight: 312 lb (142 kg)

Career information
- High school: Olathe South
- College: Auburn (2014–2017)
- NFL draft: 2018: 2nd round, 37th overall pick

Career history
- Indianapolis Colts (2018–2025); Houston Texans (2026–present)

Awards and highlights
- PFWA All-Rookie Team (2018); First-team All-American (2017); Jacobs Blocking Trophy (2017); 2× First-team All-SEC (2016, 2017); Second-team All-SEC (2015)

Career NFL statistics as of 2025
- Games played: 107
- Games started: 105
- Stats at Pro Football Reference

Braden Smith (born March 25, 1996) is an American professional football offensive tackle for the Houston Texans of the National Football League (NFL). He played college football for the Auburn Tigers.

== Early life ==
A native of Olathe, Kansas, Smith attended Olathe South High School, where he was a two-way lineman on the football varsity. Smith was credited with 82 pancake blocks on offense, 59 tackles on defense in his senior season.

Regarded as a four-star recruit by ESPN, Smith was ranked as the No. 9 offensive guard prospect in the class of 2014. He had offers from Alabama, Texas A&M, Georgia and Notre Dame, and decided to commit to Auburn University on May 27, 2014.

== College career ==
Smith played as a freshman, appearing in 12 games. In his sophomore season at Auburn, he played right guard and was named Second-team All-Southeastern Conference (SEC). Smith received All-America honors in both 2016 and 2017 as well as received the Jacobs Blocking Trophy for the best blocker in the SEC in 2017. He finished his collegiate career with 41 starts in four seasons.

== Professional career ==
Pre-draft measurables
| Height | Weight | Arm length | Hand span | Wingspan | 40-yard dash | 10-yard split | 20-yard split | 20-yard shuttle | Three-cone drill | Vertical jump | Broad jump | Bench press |
|---|---|---|---|---|---|---|---|---|---|---|---|---|
| 6 ft 6 1/4 in (1.99 m) | 315 lb (143 kg) | 32 1/4 in (0.82 m) | 9 3/8 in (0.24 m) | 6 ft 6 1/8 in (1.98 m) | 5.22 s | 1.80 s | 3.01 s | 4.77 s | 7.81 s | 33.5 in (0.85 m) | 9 ft 5 in (2.87 m) | 35 reps |
All values from NFL Combine/Pro Day

=== Indianapolis Colts ===
Smith was selected by the Indianapolis Colts in the second round, 37th overall, of the 2018 NFL draft. He was named the starting right tackle in Week 5, and started the final 12 games, as well as both games in the playoffs. He was named to the PFWA All-Rookie Team.

Smith was placed on the reserve/COVID-19 list by the team on December 25, 2020, and activated on December 30.

On July 28, 2021, Smith signed a four-year, $72.4 million contract extension with the Colts.

Smith started all 13 appearances for Indianapolis during the 2025 season. On December 13, 2025, Smith was placed on injured reserve due to a concussion and neck injury suffered in Week 14 against the Jacksonville Jaguars.

=== Houston Texans ===
On March 10, 2026, Smith signed with the division rival Houston Texans on a two-year, $25 million contract. He was placed on injured reserve on September 1, after suffering a torn plantar fascia in his foot. He was activated on October 14.

== Personal life ==
In 2024, Smith was diagnosed with a type of obsessive–compulsive disorder (OCD) called religious scrupulosity. The disorder caused him to miss playing in the final five games of the 2024 NFL season and nearly drove him to retirement. He traveled to Mexico to be treated with ibogaine and 5-MeO-DMT, as the use of these psychedelic substances is banned in the United States, before returning home and beginning therapy. He reported improvement in his condition after the treatment.

Smith is Christian. He is married; he and his wife have a son.
