= Kamryn Pettway =

American football player (born 1996)

Profile
- Position: Running back

Personal information
- Born: December 20, 1996 (age 29); Montgomery, Alabama, U.S.
- Listed height: 6 ft 0 in (1.83 m)
- Listed weight: 233 lb (106 kg)

Career information
- High school: Prattville (AL)
- College: Auburn
- NFL draft: 2018: undrafted

Career history
- Minnesota Vikings (2018)*; Columbus Lions (2019); Rarámuris de Ciudad Juárez (2021–2022); Columbus Lions (2023)
- * Offseason or practice squad member only

Awards and highlights
- First-team All-SEC (2016)

Kamryn Pettway (born December 20, 1996) is an American football running back. He played college football at Auburn.

== Early life ==
Pettway attended Prattville High School in Prattville, Alabama. As a senior, he rushed 1,402 yards with 17 touchdowns. He committed to Auburn University to play college football.

== College career ==
After redshirting his first year at Auburn in 2014, Pettway played in 12 games as a fullback in 2015. As a redshirt sophomore in 2016, he played in 10 games and was Auburn's leading rusher with 1,224 yards on 209 carries with seven touchdowns. He was named first-team All-SEC. After his team's loss in the 2018 Peach Bowl, Pettway announced that he would forgo his final year of eligibility and enter the 2018 NFL draft.

== Professional career ==
Pettway signed with the Minnesota Vikings as an undrafted free agent on April 30, 2018. He was waived on May 7, 2018.

In November 2020, he signed with the Rarámuris de Ciudad Juárez of the Fútbol Americano de México ahead of the 2021 season.
