= 2015 Auburn Tigers football team =

American college football season

2015 Auburn Tigers football

Birmingham Bowl champion

Birmingham Bowl, W 31–10 vs. Memphis
- Conference: Southeastern Conference
- Western Division
- Record: 7–6 (2–6 SEC)
- Head coach: Gus Malzahn (3rd season)
- Offensive coordinator: Rhett Lashlee (3rd season)
- Co-offensive coordinator: Dameyune Craig (3rd season)
- Offensive scheme: Hurry-up no-huddle, multiple
- Defensive coordinator: Will Muschamp (1st straight; 3rd overall season)
- Base defense: 4–3
- Home stadium: Jordan–Hare Stadium

2015 Southeastern Conference football standings
	Conf.			Overall
Team	W		L	W		L
Eastern Division
No. 25 Florida x	7	–	1	10	–	4
No. 22 Tennessee	5	–	3	9	–	4
Georgia	5	–	3	10	–	3
Vanderbilt	2	–	6	4	–	8
Kentucky	2	–	6	5	–	7
Missouri*	1	–	7	5	–	7
South Carolina	1	–	7	3	–	9
Western Division
No. 1 Alabama x$#^	7	–	1	14	–	1
No. 10 Ole Miss	6	–	2	10	–	3
Arkansas	5	–	3	8	–	5
No. 16 LSU *	5	–	3	9	–	3
Texas A&M	4	–	4	8	–	5
Mississippi State	4	–	4	9	–	4
Auburn	2	–	6	7	–	6
Championship: Alabama 29, Florida 15
# – College Football Playoff champion; ^ – College Football Playoff participant; $ – Conference champion; x – Division champion/co-champions; * LSU and Missouri vacated all wins due to NCAA violations.; Rankings from AP Poll

The 2015 Auburn Tigers football team represented Auburn University in the 2015 NCAA Division I FBS football season. The Tigers played their home games at Jordan–Hare Stadium in Auburn, Alabama and competed in the Western Division of the Southeastern Conference (SEC). They were led by third-year head coach Gus Malzahn. They finished the season 7–6, 2–6 in SEC play to finish in last place in the Western Division. They were invited to the Birmingham Bowl where they defeated Memphis.

== Before the season ==
=== Departures ===
The Tigers lost 18 seniors to graduation as well as two juniors who chose to forgo their senior season in pursuit of an earlier NFL career. The Tigers lost 12 more players from the 2014 team due to various reasons.

Name	Position	Year	Reason
Chad Slade	OG	rSR	Graduation/NFL (Houston Texans—FA)
Jeff Whitaker	DT	rSR	Graduation
LaDarius Owens	DE	rSR	Graduation
Jonathon Mincy	CB	rSR	Graduation/NFL (Atlanta Falcons—FA)
Trovon Reed	CB	rSR	Graduation/NFL (Seattle Seahawks—FA)
Corey Grant	RB	rSR	Graduation/NFL (Jacksonville Jaguars—FA)
Nick Marshall	QB	SR	Graduation/NFL (Jacksonville Jaguars—FA)
Cameron Artis-Payne	RB	SR	Graduation/NFL (Carolina Panthers—5th Round)
Quan Bray	WR	SR	Graduation/NFL (Indianapolis Colts—FA)
C. J. Uzomah	TE	SR	Graduation/NFL (Cincinnati Bengals—5th Round)
Brandon Fulse	TE	SR	Graduation/NFL (Chicago Bears—FA)
Reese Dismukes	C	SR	Graduation/NFL (Pittsburgh Steelers—FA)
Gabe Wright	DT	SR	Graduation/NFL (Detroit Lions—4th Round)
Angelo Blackson	DT	SR	Graduation/NFL (Tennessee Titans—4th Round)
Ben Bradley	DT	SR	Graduation
Jermaine Whitehead	S	SR	Graduation/NFL (San Francisco 49ers—FA)
Robensen Therezie	S	SR	Graduation/NFL (Atlanta Falcons—FA)
Brandon King	S	SR	Graduation/NFL (New England Patriots—FA)
Jaylon Denson	WR	rJR	Graduation (injury forced him to end career)
Anthony Swain	LB	rJR	Chose to graduate and transfer
Sammie Coates	WR	rJR	NFL (Pittsburgh Steelers—3rd Round)
Patrick Miller	OT	JR	NFL (San Francisco 49ers—FA)
Derrick Moncrief	LB/S	JR	Transferred
Joe Turner	CB	JR	Transferred
Elijah Daniel	DE	SO	Dismissed
Khari Harding	LB	SO	Transferred
Mackenro Alexander	S	SO	Transferred
Kamryn Melton	CB	rFR	Transferred
Dominick Walker	WR	rFR	Transferred
Jimmy Hutchinson	P	rFR	Chose to end football career
Jakell Mitchell	TE	FR	Murdered on December 14, 2014
Kalvaraz Bessent	CB	FR	Transferred

=== Returning starters ===
Returning players that started all or a significant number of games in the 2014 season.

==== Offense ====
Player	Class	Position
D'haquille "Duke" Williams	SR	WR
Ricardo Louis	SR	WR
Melvin Ray	SR	WR
Avery Young	rJR	OT
Shon Coleman	rJR	OT
Alex Kozan †	rJR	OG

==== Defense ====
Player	Class	Position
Kris Frost	rSR	LB
Cassanova McKinzy	SR	LB
Jonathan Jones	SR	CB
Joshua Holsey	SR	S
Rudy Ford	JR	S
Carl Lawson †	rSO	DE

==== Special teams ====
Player	Class	Position
Daniel Carlson	rSO	K

† Indicates player was a starter in 2013 but missed all of 2014 due to injury.

=== Recruiting class ===
The Tigers would go on to land another top 10 recruiting class in 2015 (#3 by Scout, #7 by Rivals, #7 by ESPN, and #9 by 247). The signing class was highlighted by Byron Cowart (DE)--widely considered the #1 recruit in the nation in the 2015 recruiting cycle. All of the players would qualify academically and enroll over the summer.

The Tigers would also add three transfer players: graduate student Blake Countess (CB) from Michigan who is able to play immediately, as well as Darius James (OL) from Texas and Jamel Dean (CB) from Ohio State, both of whom must sit out one year to satisfy the NCAA's transfer rule.

College recruiting (2015)
Name	Hometown	School	Height	Weight	Commit date
Montavious Atkinson; S	Fairburn, Georgia	Langston Hughes High School	6 ft 1 in (1.85 m)	183 lb (83 kg)	Mar 17, 2014
Montavious Atkinson; S	Recruit ratings: Scout: Rivals: 247Sports: ESPN:				
Tyler Carr; OG	Southside, Alabama	Southside High School	6 ft 5 in (1.96 m)	313 lb (142 kg)	Jun 24, 2014
Tyler Carr; OG	Recruit ratings: Scout: Rivals: 247Sports: ESPN:				
Jordan Colbert; S	Griffin, Georgia	Griffin High School	6 ft 1 in (1.85 m)	226 lb (103 kg)	Apr 26, 2014
Jordan Colbert; S	Recruit ratings: Scout: Rivals: 247Sports: ESPN:				
Byron Cowart; DE	Seffner, Florida	Armwood High School	6 ft 3 in (1.91 m)	277 lb (126 kg)	Feb 4, 2015
Byron Cowart; DE	Recruit ratings: Scout: Rivals: 247Sports: ESPN:				
Chandler Cox; FB	Apopka, Florida	Apopka High School	6 ft 1 in (1.85 m)	232 lb (105 kg)	May 31, 2014
Chandler Cox; FB	Recruit ratings: Scout: Rivals: 247Sports: ESPN:				
Carlton Davis; CB	Miami, Florida	Miami Norland High School	6 ft 1 in (1.85 m)	190 lb (86 kg)	Feb 4, 2015
Carlton Davis; CB	Recruit ratings: Scout: Rivals: 247Sports: ESPN:				
Javarius Davis; CB	Jacksonville, Florida	Edward H. White High School	5 ft 10 in (1.78 m)	180 lb (82 kg)	Feb 4, 2015
Javarius Davis; CB	Recruit ratings: Scout: Rivals: 247Sports: ESPN:				
Ryan Davis; WR	St. Petersburg, Florida	Lakewood High School	5 ft 9 in (1.75 m)	164 lb (74 kg)	Feb 4, 2015
Ryan Davis; WR	Recruit ratings: Scout: Rivals: 247Sports: ESPN:				
Jerimiah Dinson; CB	Hialeah, Florida	American High School	5 ft 11 in (1.80 m)	172 lb (78 kg)	Jan 26, 2015
Jerimiah Dinson; CB	Recruit ratings: Scout: Rivals: 247Sports: ESPN:				
Marquel Harrell; OG	Fairburn, Georgia	Creekside High School	6 ft 3 in (1.91 m)	325 lb (147 kg)	Apr 21, 2014
Marquel Harrell; OG	Recruit ratings: Scout: Rivals: 247Sports: ESPN:				
Jalen Harris; TE	Montgomery, Alabama	Saint James School	6 ft 4 in (1.93 m)	250 lb (110 kg)	Jun 24, 2014
Jalen Harris; TE	Recruit ratings: Scout: Rivals: 247Sports: ESPN:				
Jeff Holland; LB	Jacksonville, Florida	Trinity Christian Academy	6 ft 2 in (1.88 m)	240 lb (110 kg)	Feb 4, 2015
Jeff Holland; LB	Recruit ratings: Scout: Rivals: 247Sports: ESPN:				
Michael Horton; OG	Atlanta, Georgia	Lakeside	6 ft 4 in (1.93 m)	312 lb (142 kg)	Feb 4, 2015
Michael Horton; OG	Recruit ratings: Scout: Rivals: 247Sports: ESPN:				
Tim Irvin; S	Miami, Florida	Westminster Christian School	5 ft 9 in (1.75 m)	194 lb (88 kg)	Jan 18, 2015
Tim Irvin; S	Recruit ratings: Scout: Rivals: 247Sports: ESPN:				
Jauntavius Johnson; DT	Lincoln, Alabama	Lincoln High School	6 ft 2 in (1.88 m)	322 lb (146 kg)	Aug 6, 2014
Jauntavius Johnson; DT	Recruit ratings: Scout: Rivals: 247Sports: ESPN:				
Kerryon Johnson; RB	Madison, Alabama	Madison Academy	6 ft 0 in (1.83 m)	195 lb (88 kg)	Apr 15, 2014
Kerryon Johnson; RB	Recruit ratings: Scout: Rivals: 247Sports: ESPN:				
Kaleb King; OG	Buford, Georgia	Mill Creek High School	6 ft 4 in (1.93 m)	284 lb (129 kg)	Apr 4, 2014
Kaleb King; OG	Recruit ratings: Scout: Rivals: 247Sports: ESPN:				
Richard McBryde; LB	Troy, Alabama	Charles Henderson High School	6 ft 1 in (1.85 m)	227 lb (103 kg)	Jul 26, 2014
Richard McBryde; LB	Recruit ratings: Scout: Rivals: 247Sports: ESPN:				
Tyler Queen; QB	Kennesaw, Georgia	North Cobb High School	6 ft 1 in (1.85 m)	241 lb (109 kg)	Jul 10, 2013
Tyler Queen; QB	Recruit ratings: Scout: Rivals: 247Sports: ESPN:				
Jovon Robinson; RB	Memphis, Tennessee	Georgia Military College	6 ft 0 in (1.83 m)	230 lb (100 kg)	May 15, 2014
Jovon Robinson; RB	Recruit ratings: Scout: Rivals: 247Sports: ESPN:				
Ian Shannon; P	Marietta, Georgia	Marietta High School	6 ft 3 in (1.91 m)	209 lb (95 kg)	Sep 3, 2014
Ian Shannon; P	Recruit ratings: Scout: Rivals: 247Sports: ESPN:				
Bailey Sharp; OT	Marietta, Georgia	Sprayberry High School	6 ft 5 in (1.96 m)	293 lb (133 kg)	Apr 19, 2014
Bailey Sharp; OT	Recruit ratings: Scout: Rivals: 247Sports: ESPN:				
Darius Slayton; WR	Norcross, Georgia	Greater Atlanta Christian School	6 ft 2 in (1.88 m)	182 lb (83 kg)	Feb 3, 2015
Darius Slayton; WR	Recruit ratings: Scout: Rivals: 247Sports: ESPN:				
Jason Smith; WR	Mobile, Alabama	Gulf Coast Community College	6 ft 1 in (1.85 m)	185 lb (84 kg)	Feb 4, 2014
Jason Smith; WR	Recruit ratings: Scout: Rivals: 247Sports: ESPN:				
Maurice Swain; DT	LaGrange, Georgia	Gulf Coast Community College	6 ft 5 in (1.96 m)	295 lb (134 kg)	Dec 17, 2014
Maurice Swain; DT	Recruit ratings: Scout: Rivals: 247Sports: ESPN:				
Prince Tega Wanogho; DE	Elmore, Alabama	Edgewood Academy	6 ft 8 in (2.03 m)	250 lb (110 kg)	Feb 3, 2015
Prince Tega Wanogho; DE	Recruit ratings: Scout: Rivals: 247Sports: ESPN:				
Darrell Williams; LB	Hoover, Alabama	Hoover High School	6 ft 2 in (1.88 m)	234 lb (106 kg)	May 7, 2014
Darrell Williams; LB	Recruit ratings: Scout: Rivals: 247Sports: ESPN:				
Overall recruit ranking: Scout: 3 Rivals: 7 247Sports: 9 ESPN: 7
Note: In many cases, Scout, Rivals, 247Sports, On3, and ESPN may conflict in their listings of height and weight.; In these cases, the average was taken. ESPN grades are on a 100-point scale.; Sources: "Auburn Signee List 2015". Rivals.; "Scout.com Football Recruiting: Aubun". Scout.; "2015 Player Signees – Auburn". ESPN.; "Scout.com Team Recruiting Rankings". Scout.; "2015 Team Ranking". Rivals.com.

=== Spring game ===
The Tigers spring game 'A-Day' was held on Saturday April 18. Team Auburn defeated team Tigers 24–14 with wide receiver Myron Burton and safety Tray Matthews earning offensive and defensive MVP honors respectively. 62,143 fans attended the game making it the highest attended spring game of the year in which the fans had to pay to attend ($5), and the 4th most attended Auburn spring game after 2013, 2014, and 2010.

Auburn A-Day Game

Quarter	1	2	3	4	Total
Tigers	0	7	0	7	14
Auburn	10	14	0	0	24

at Jordan–Hare Stadium • Auburn, Alabama

- Date: April 18, 2015
- Game time: 1:00 p.m. CDT
- Game weather: Temperature: 70 °F (21 °C) • Wind 3 mph (4.8 km/h) S • Weather: Cloudy
- Game attendance: 62,143
- TV announcers (SEC Network+): Dave Baker (play-by-play), Andre Ware (analyst), Maria Taylor (sideline reporter)

== Personnel ==
=== Roster and staff ===
2015 Auburn Tigers football team roster
Players
Coaches
Offense

Pos.	#	Name	Class
WR	1	D'haquille Williams	Sr
WR	4	Jason Smith	So
WR	5	Ricardo Louis	Sr
QB	6	Jeremy Johnson	Jr
WR	8	Tony Stevens	Jr
RB	9	Roc Thomas	So
WR	10	Stanton Truitt	Fr
WR	12	Jonathan Wallace	Sr
QB	13	Sean White	Fr
QB	15	Tyler Queen	Fr
QB	16	Tucker Tuberville	Jr
RB	21	Kerryon Johnson	Fr
RB	25	Peyton Barber	Fr
FB	27	Chandler Cox	Fr
RB	29	Jovon Robinson	Jr
RB	30	Damien Lewis	So
FB	36	Kamryn Pettway	Fr
WR	37	Logan Rice	Fr
RB	38	Tyler LaFlamme	Fr
FB	39	Robert Muschamp	Fr
RB	40	Tracy Kendall	So
TE	41	Greg Hall	Jr
FB	42	Keenan Sweeney	Fr
TE	43	Spencer Smith	So
TE	46	Chris Laye	Fr
RB	48	Lawyer Tillman	Sr
FB	49	Patrick Young	Jr
C	52	Xavier Dampeer	Sr
G	53	Devonte Danzey	Sr
OT	54	Kaleb King	Fr
OT	56	Avery Young	Jr
OL	61	Ryan Meneely	Fr
G	63	Alex Kozan	So
G	64	Mike Horton	Fr
OL	65	Tucker Brown	Fr
G	66	Bailey Sharp	Fr
G	67	Tyler Carr	Fr
OL	68	Mathew Taylor	Fr
G	70	Robert Leff	Jr
OT	71	Braden Smith	So
OT	72	Shon Coleman	Jr
C	73	Austin Golson	So
OT	74	Will Adams	Jr
G	75	Deon Mix	So
G	76	Jordan Diamond	Jr
G	77	Marquel Harrell	Fr
OL	78	Blake Snow	Fr
WR	80	Marcus Davis	Jr
WR	81	Darius Slayton	Fr
WR	82	Melvin Ray	Sr
WR	83	Ryan Davis	Fr
WR	84	Myron Burton	Fr
TE	85	Jalen Harris	Fr
WR	86	Jimmie Stoudemire	Fr
WR	87	Gray King	So
TE/HB	89	Emory Carney	Fr

Defense

Pos.	#	Name	Class
DT	1	Montravius Adams	Jr
CB	3	Jonathan Jones	Sr
LB	4	Jeff Holland	Fr
DE	6	DaVonte Lambert	Sr
LB	8	Cassanova McKinzy	Sr
DE	9	Byron Cowart	Fr
S	11	Markell Boston	Fr
CB	13	T.J. Davis (injured)	Jr
CB	14	Stephen Roberts	So
S	15	Joshua Holsey	Sr
LB	16	JaViere Mitchell	So
LB	17	Kris Frost	Sr
CB	18	Carlton Davis	Fr
S	19	Nick Ruffin	So
CB	20	Jeremiah Dinson	So
S	22	Tim Irvin	Fr
S	23	Jonathan Ford	Jr
CB	24	Blake Countess	Sr
LB	26	Justin Garrett	Sr
S	28	Tray Matthews	So
LB	30	Tre Williams	So
CB	31	Javaris Davis	Fr
DL	32	Alec Brown	Fr
LB	33	Kenny Flowers	Jr
DB	36	Michael Sherwood	So
DB	38	Austin Dupper	Jr
LB	40	Daniel Pond	Jr
S	41	Jordan Colbert	Fr
DE	42	Gimel President	Jr
DB	44	Raymond Lester	Fr
DE	45	Keymiya Harrell	Jr
DB	46	Ben Hood	Fr
LB	47	Cameron Toney	So
S	48	Montavious Atkinson	Fr
LB	49	Darrell Williams	Fr
LB	51	Richard McBryde	Fr
DE	55	Carl Lawson	So
LB	57	Deshaun Davis	Fr
LB	58	Josh Shockley	Fr
DE	59	Raashed Kennion	So
DT	62	Jauntavius Johnson	Fr
DE	79	Andrew Williams	Fr
DT	90	Maurice Swain	Jr
DE	92	Justin Thornton	Fr
DT	94	Devaroe Lawrence	Jr
DT	95	Dontavius Russell	Fr
DL	96	Aaron Garrison	So
DL	97	Gary Walker	Fr
DL	98	Tyler Carter	Fr
DE	98	Prince Tega Wanogho	Fr

Special teams

Pos.	#	Name	Class
P	29	Tyler Stovall	So
K	31	Duncan McKinnley	Jr
K	33	Will Hastings	Fr
K	38	Daniel Carlson	So
K/P	39	Thomas Tyner	Jr
LS	43	Jonathan Parslow	Fr
K/P	43	Ian Shannon	Fr
LS	58	Zach Wade	Fr
P	64	Jack Bjork	So
LS	69	Ike Powell	So
P	91	Kevin Phillips	Jr

Head coach

- Gus Malzahn – 3rd year

Coordinators/assistant coaches

- Will Muschamp (Defensive Coordinator / Safeties) – 1st year
- Rhett Lashlee (Offensive Coordinator / Quarterbacks) – 3rd year
- Rodney Garner (Associate head coach / Defensive Line) – 3rd year
- Dameyune Craig (Co-Offensive Coordinator / Wide Receivers) – 3rd year
- Travaris Robinson (Cornerbacks) – 1st year
- Scott Fountain (Special Teams / Tight Ends) – 3rd year
- Lance Thompson (Linebackers) – 1st year
- Tim Horton (Running Backs) – 3rd year
- J.B. Grimes (Offensive Linemen) – 3rd year
- Bobby Bentley (Senior Offensive Analyst) – 2nd year
- Ryan Russell (Strength and Conditioning) – 3rd year
- Jonathan Brewer (Graduate Assistant) – 3rd year

Legend

- (C) Team captain
- (S) Suspended
- (I) Ineligible
- Injured
- Redshirt

Roster
Last update: August 4, 2015

=== Depth chart ===
Official Depth Chart as of 9/1/2015

Defense

FS
(23) Rudy Ford
(22) Tim Irvin

WILL	MIKE	SAM
(17) Kris Frost OR (30) Tre Williams	(8) Cassanova McKinzy OR (30) Tre Williams	(26) Justin Garrett
⋅	⋅	(16) JaViere Mitchell

SS
(28) Tray Matthews
(19) Nick Ruffin

CB
(3) Jonathan Jones
(15) Joshua Holsey OR
(18) Carlton Davis

DE	DT	DT	DE
(6) DaVonte Lambert	(1) Montravius Adams	(95) Dontavius Russell	(55) Carl Lawson
(9) Byron Cowart	(90) Maurice Swain	(94) Devaroe Lawrence	(59) Raashed Kennion

CB
(24) Blake Countess
(20) Jeremiah Dinson

Offense

WR
(8) Tony Stevens
⋅

WR
(82) Melvin Ray OR
(80) Marcus Davis
(4) Jason Smith OR
(83) Ryan Davis

LT	LG	C	RG	RT
(72) Shon Coleman	(63) Alex Kozan OR (53) Devonte Danzey	(73) Austin Golson	(71) Braden Smith	(56) Avery Young
(70) Robert Leff	⋅	(52) Xavier Dampeer	(74) Will Adams	(64) Mike Horton

TE
(85) Jalen Harris
(46) Chris Laye

WR
(5) Ricardo Louis
(10) Stanton Truitt

QB
(13) Sean White
(6) Jeremy Johnson

Key reserves
HB
(36) Kamryn Pettway OR
(27) Chandler Cox
NICKEL
(22) Tim Irvin
(24) Blake Countess OR
(15) Joshua Holsey OR
(20) Jeremiah Dinson
Injured
(13) T.J. Davis (CB)

RB
(9) Roc Thomas
(25) Peyton Barber OR
(29) Jovon Robinson

Special teams
PK (38) Daniel Carlson
PK (43) Ian Shannon
P (91) Kevin Philips
P (43) Ian Shannon
KR (23) Johnathan Ford OR
(5) Ricardo Louis
(24) Blake Countess OR
(9) Roc Thomas
PR (80) Marcus Davis OR
(4) Jason Smith
LS (69) Ike Powell
H (29) Tyler Stovall

== Schedule ==
Auburn announced their 2015 football schedule on October 14, 2014. The 2015 schedule consist of 7 home games and 4 away games in the regular season. One game is at a neutral site in Atlanta, Georgia against the Louisville Cardinals in the Chick-fil-A Kickoff Game on September 5. The Tigers will host SEC foes Alabama, Georgia, Mississippi State, and Ole Miss, and will travel to Arkansas, Kentucky, LSU, and Texas A&M, also the Tigers made it to the Birmingham Bowl which is played at Legion Field.

Date	Time	Opponent	Rank	Site	TV	Result	Attendance
September 5	2:30 p.m.	vs. Louisville*	No. 6	Georgia Dome; Atlanta, GA (Chick-fil-A Kickoff Game)	CBS	W 31–24	73,927
September 12	11:00 a.m.	No. 5 (FCS) Jacksonville State*	No. 6	Jordan–Hare Stadium; Auburn, AL	SECN	W 27–20 ^{OT}	87,451
September 19	2:30 p.m.	at No. 13 LSU	No. 18	Tiger Stadium; Baton Rouge, LA (Tiger Bowl, SEC Nation)	CBS	L 21–45	102,321
September 26	6:30 p.m.	Mississippi State		Jordan–Hare Stadium; Auburn, AL	ESPN	L 9–17	87,451
October 3	3:00 p.m.	San Jose State*^{†}		Jordan–Hare Stadium; Auburn, AL	SECN	W 35–21	87,451
October 15	6:00 p.m.	at Kentucky		Commonwealth Stadium; Lexington, KY	ESPN	W 30–27	63,407
October 24	11:00 a.m.	at Arkansas		Donald W. Reynolds Razorback Stadium; Fayetteville, AR	SECN	L 46–54 ^{4OT}	72,008
October 31	12:00 p.m.	No. 19 Ole Miss		Jordan–Hare Stadium; Auburn, AL (rivalry)	ESPN	L 19–27	87,451
November 7	6:30 p.m.	at No. 19 Texas A&M		Kyle Field; College Station, TX	SECN	W 26–10	104,625
November 14	11:00 a.m.	Georgia		Jordan–Hare Stadium; Auburn, AL (Deep South's Oldest Rivalry)	CBS	L 13–20	87,451
November 21	3:00 p.m.	Idaho*		Jordan–Hare Stadium; Auburn, AL	SECN	W 56–34	87,451
November 28	2:30 p.m.	No. 2 Alabama		Jordan–Hare Stadium; Auburn, AL (Iron Bowl, SEC Nation)	CBS	L 13–29	87,451
December 30	11:00 a.m.	vs. Memphis*		Legion Field; Birmingham, AL (Birmingham Bowl)	ESPN	W 31–10	59,430
*Non-conference game; ^{†}Homecoming; Rankings from AP Poll released prior to the game; All times are in Central time

== Game summaries ==
=== Louisville ===
2015 Chick-fil-A Kickoff Game
Louisville Cardinals vs #6 Auburn Tigers – Game summary

Quarter	1	2	3	4	Total
Louisville	0	0	10	14	24
#6 Auburn	7	10	7	7	31

at Georgia Dome • Atlanta, Georgia

- Date: September 5, 2015
- Game time: 2:40 p.m.
- Game weather: Indoors
- Game attendance: 73,927
- Referee: John O'Neill
- TV announcers (CBS): Verne Lundquist (play-by-play), Gary Danielson (analyst), Allie LaForce (sideline reporter)

Game information

First Quarter

- AUB – Jeremy Johnson 1 yd run (Daniel Carlson kick), 12:49 (AUB 7–0)

Second Quarter

- AUB – Justin Garrett 82 yd fumble return (Daniel Carlson kick), 6:54 (AUB 14–0)
- AUB – Daniel Carlson 56 yd field goal, 0:34 (AUB 17–0)

Third Quarter

- AUB – Ricardo Louis 33 yd pass from Jeremy Johnson (Daniel Carlson kick), 11:21 (AUB 24–0)
- LOU – John Wallace 43 yd field goal, 7:07 (AUB 24–3)
- LOU – Lamar Jackson 10 yd run (John Wallace kick), 1:51 (AUB 24–10)

Fourth Quarter

- AUB – Ricardo Louis 8 yd run (Daniel Carlson kick), 10:04 (AUB 31–10)
- LOU – Brandon Radcliff 2 yd run (John Wallace kick), 6:21 (AUB 31–17)
- LOU – Brandon Radcliff 2 yd run (John Wallace kick), 2:59 (AUB 31–24)

Top Passers

- LOU − Lamar Jackson 9–20, 100 yds, 1 INT
- AUB − Jeremy Johnson 11–21, 137 yds, 1 TD, 3 INT

Top Rushers

- LOU − Lamar Jackson 16 carries, 106 yds, 1 TD
- AUB − Peyton Barber 24 carries, 115 yds

Top Receiving

- LOU − James Quick 4 receptions, 28 yds
- AUB − Ricardo Louis 3 receptions, 54 yds, 1 TD

It was announced on August 29, 2013, that Auburn and Louisville would meet in the Chick-fil-A Kickoff Game in 2015. In the game, Auburn started with an interception and scored in the first 2 minutes. Auburn jumped out to a 24–0 lead, but Louisville, led by Lamar Jackson came back. After an timeout for Louisville with around a minute to go, Auburn was able to run out the clock and win 31–24.

=== Jacksonville State ===
Jacksonville State Gamecocks at #6 Auburn Tigers – Game summary

Quarter	1	2	3	4	OT	Total
Jacksonville State	0	10	0	10	0	20
#6 Auburn	3	3	7	7	7	27

at Jordan–Hare Stadium • Auburn, Alabama

- Date: September 12, 2015
- Game time: 11:01 a.m.
- Game weather: Temperature: 70 °F (21 °C) • Wind N 5 mph (8.0 km/h) • Weather: Cloudy
- Game attendance: 87,451
- Referee: Brad Rogers
- TV announcers (SEC Network): Dave Neal (play-by-play), Matt Stinchcomb (analyst), Dawn Davenport (sideline reporter)

Game information

First Quarter

- AUB – Daniel Carlson 27 yd field goal, 3:06 (AUB 3–0)

Second Quarter

- JSU – Connor Rouleau 32 yd field goal, 13:29 (TIE 3–3)
- AUB – Daniel Carlson 49 yd field goal, 9:55 (AUB 6–3)
- JSU – Josh Barge 11 yd pass from Eli Jenkins (Connor Rouleau kick), 5:31 (JSU 10–6)

Third Quarter

- AUB – Roc Thomas 51 yd pass from Jeremy Johnson (Daniel Carlson kick), 8:35 (AUB 13–10)

Fourth Quarter

- JSU – Connor Rouleau 26 yd field goal, 10:43 (TIE 13–13)
- JSU – Troymaine Pope 5 yd run (Connor Rouleau kick), 5:38 (JSU 20–13)
- AUB – Melvin Ray 10 yd pass from Jeremy Johnson (Daniel Carlson kick), 0:39 (TIE 20–20)

Overtime

- AUB – Peyton Barber 4 yd run (Daniel Carlson kick), 0:00 (AUB 27–20)

Top Passers

- JSU − Eli Jenkins 26–43, 277 yds, 1 TD, 1 INT
- AUB − Jeremy Johnson 21–32, 236 yds, 2 TD, 2 INT

Top Rushers

- JSU − Troymaine Pope 21 carries, 89 yds, 1 TD
- AUB − Peyton Barber 23 carries, 128 yds, 1 TD

Top Receiving

- JSU − Josh Barge 14 receptions, 132 yds, 1 TD
- AUB − Ricardo Louis 10 receptions, 76 yds

In their home opener, Auburn played Jacksonville State. This was the debut of Auburn's new jumbotron which is the biggest in college football. In a game that many expected to be a blowout, Jacksonville State hung with Auburn and led at halftime. With 39 seconds left in the ballgame and Jacksonville State leading 20–13, Melvin Ray caught a touchdown from Jeremy Johnson. Jacksonville State got the ball back and took a knee, sending the game to overtime. In overtime, Peyton Barber scored from four yards out putting Auburn ahead 27–20. Jacksonville State got the ball and got it to the 5 yard line. On 3rd Down and Goal, Cassanova McKinzy sacked Eli Jenkins setting up 4th Down and Goal. Jenkins threw a pass to the end zone which was caught out of bounds, so it was incomplete and Auburn had escaped with a 27–20 win in overtime.

=== LSU ===
#18 Auburn Tigers at #13 LSU Tigers – Game summary

Quarter	1	2	3	4	Total
#18 Auburn	0	0	14	7	21
#13 LSU	14	10	14	7	45

at Tiger Stadium • Baton Rouge, Louisiana

- Date: September 19, 2015
- Game time: 2:39 p.m.
- Game weather: Temperature: 91 °F (33 °C) • Wind 8 mph (13 km/h) NW • Weather: Partly Cloudy
- Game attendance: 102,321
- Referee: Matt Loeffler
- TV announcers (CBS): Verne Lundquist (play-by-play), Gary Danielson (analyst), Allie LaForce (sideline reporter)

Game information

First Quarter

- LSU – Bradon Harris 2 yd run (Trent Domingue kick), 13:19 (LSU 7–0)
- LSU – Colin Jeter 1 yd pass from Brandon Harris (Trent Domingue kick), 1:39 (LSU 14–0)

Second Quarter

- LSU – Trent Domingue 32 yd field goal, 6:54 (LSU 17–0)
- LSU – Leonard Fournette 40 yd run (Trent Domingue kick), 2:10 (LSU 24–0)

Third Quarter

- AUB – Jeremy Johnson 65 yd run (Daniel Carlson), 13:19 (LSU 24–7)
- LSU – Leonard Fournette 29 yd run (Trent Domingue kick), 10:56 (LSU 31–7)
- LSU – Leonard Fournette 1 yd run (Trent Domingue kick), 4:54 (LSU 38–7)
- AUB – Melvin Ray 9 yd pass from Jeremy Johnson (Daniel Carlson kick), 1:03 (LSU 38–14)

Fourth Quarter

- LSU – Brandon Harris 1 yd run (Trent Domingue kick), 11:23 (LSU 45–14)
- AUB – D'haquille Williams 10 yd pass from Jeremy Johnson (Daniel Carlson kick), 5:47 (LSU 45–21)

Top Passers

- AUB − Jeremy Johnson 11–19, 100 yds, 2 TD, 1 INT
- LSU − Brandon Harris 12–17, 74 yds, 1 TD

Top Rushers

- AUB − Jeremy Johnson 12 carries, 41 yds, 1 TD
- LSU − Leonard Fournette 19 carries, 228 yds, 3 TD

Top Receiving

- AUB − Kerryon Johnson 3 receptions, 17 yds
- LSU − Travin Dural 4 receptions, 27 yds

In the third game of the season, Auburn traveled to what is widely considered to be the toughest place to play in college football. They took on the LSU Tigers in the 50th meeting in the Tiger Bowl rivalry game. Leonard Fournette had a career game and LSU jumped out to a 24–0 lead en route to a 45–21 victory. Auburn's record fell to 2–1.

=== Mississippi State ===
Mississippi State Bulldogs at Auburn Tigers – Game summary

Quarter	1	2	3	4	Total
Mississippi State	7	7	3	0	17
Auburn	0	0	6	3	9

at Jordan–Hare Stadium • Auburn, Alabama

- Date: September 26, 2015
- Game time: 6:36 p.m.
- Game weather: Temperature: • Wind: • Weather:
- Game attendance: 87,451
- Referee: John McDaid
- TV announcers (ESPN2): Mark Jones (play-by-play), Rod Gilmore (analyst), Quint Kessenich (sideline reporter)

Game information

First Quarter

- MSU – Gabe Myles 32 yd pass from Dak Prescott (Westin Graves kick), 5:18 (MSU 7–0)

Second Quarter

- MSU – De'Runnya Wilson 17 yd pass from Dak Prescott (Westin Graves kick), 8:02 (MSU 14–0)

Third Quarter

- AUB – Daniel Carlson 30 yd field goal, 9:41 (MSU 14–3)
- AUB – Daniel Carlson 25 yd field goal, 3:06 (MSU 14–6)
- MSU – Westin Graves 44 yd field goal, 1:11 (MSU 17–6)

Fourth Quarter

- AUB – Daniel Carlson 51 yd field goal, 1:07 (MSU 17–9)

Top Passers

- MSU − Dak Prescott 29–41, 270 yds, 2 TD
- AUB − Sean White 20–28, 188 yds, 1 INT

Top Rushers

- MSU − Brandon Holloway 5 carries, 42 yds
- AUB − Peyton Barber 27 carries, 137 yds

Top Receiving

- MSU − Fred Ross 7 receptions, 66 yds
- AUB − D'haquille Williams 4 receptions, 49 yds

In the fourth game of the season, Auburn took on the Mississippi State Bulldogs. It was Sean White's first start as quarterback for Auburn. The offense and defense both looked improved from the last two weeks, but Auburn had to settle for field goals rather than touchdowns in the red zone. Miscues such as an interception, and a high snap, both in the red zone hurt Auburn's chances in the ballgame, and Mississippi State won 17–9. It was the first time in the Gus Malzahn era at Auburn (including his time as offensive coordinator from 2009 to 2011) that Auburn had failed to score a touchdown.

=== San Jose State ===
San Jose State Spartans at Auburn Tigers – Game summary

Quarter	1	2	3	4	Total
San Jose State	7	0	7	7	21
Auburn	14	7	7	7	35

at Jordan–Hare Stadium • Auburn, Alabama

- Date: October 3, 2015
- Game time: 3:01 p.m.
- Game weather: Temperature: 63 °F (17 °C) • Wind 10 mph (16 km/h) • Weather: Cloudy
- Game attendance: 87,451
- Referee: Marvel July
- TV announcers (SEC Network): Dave Neal (play-by-play), Matt Stinchcomb (analyst), Kayce Smith (sideline reporter)

Game information

First Quarter

- AUB – Peyton Barber 2 yd run (Daniel Carlson kick), 9:54 (AUB 7–0)
- SJSU – Tyler Winston 18 yd pass from Joe Gray (Bryce Crawford kick), 4:55 (TIE 7–7)
- AUB – Peyton Barber 2 yd run (Daniel Carlson kick), 2:32 (AUB 14–7)

Second Quarter

- AUB – Peyton Barber 5 yd run (Daniel Carlson kick), 0:38 (AUB 21–7)

Third Quarter

- SJSU – Joe Gray 1 yd run (Bryce Crawford kick), 8:01 (AUB 21–14)
- AUB – Peyton Barber 1 yd run (Daniel Carlson kick), 4:37 (AUB 28–14)

Fourth Quarter

- SJSU – Tyler Ervin 2 yd run (Bryce Crawford kick), 5:38 (AUB 28–21)
- AUB – Peyton Barber 36 yd run (Daniel Carlson kick), 4:43 (AUB 35–21)

Top Passers

- SJSU − Joe Gray 21–33, 224 yds, 1 TD, 2 INT
- AUB − Sean White 6–10, 108 yds

Top Rushers

- SJSU − Tyler Ervin 27 carries, 160 yds, 1 TD
- AUB − Peyton Barber 28 carries, 147 yds, 5 TD

Top Receiving

- SJSU − Billy Freeman 6 receptions, 59 yds
- AUB − Ricardo Louis 3 receptions, 47 yds

=== Kentucky ===
Auburn Tigers at Kentucky Wildcats – Game summary

Quarter	1	2	3	4	Total
Auburn	14	9	0	7	30
Kentucky	7	3	10	7	27

at Commonwealth Stadium • Lexington, Kentucky

- Date: October 15, 2015
- Game time: 6:01 p.m.
- Game weather: Temperature: 66 °F (19 °C) • Wind SSW 7 mph (11 km/h) • Weather: Sunny, Chilling
- Game attendance: 63,407
- Referee: Hubert Owens
- TV announcers (ESPN): Dave Flemming (play-by-play), Mack Brown (analyst), Allison Williams (sideline reporter)

Game information

First Quarter

- AUB – Peyton Barber 1 yd run (Daniel Carlson kick), 11:07 (AUB 7–0)
- UK – Boom Williams 1 yd run (Austin MacGinnis kick), 8:46 (TIE 7–7)
- AUB – Kerryon Johnson 6 yd run (Daniel Carlson kick), 6:10 (AUB 14–7)

Second Quarter

- AUB – Daniel Carlson 34 yd field goal, 8:59 (AUB 17–7)
- UK – Austin MacGinnis 28 yd field goal, 4:55 (AUB 17–10)
- AUB – Daniel Carlson 29 yd field goal, 1:43 (AUB 20–10)
- AUB – Daniel Carlson 52 yd field goal, 0:00 (AUB 23–10)

Third Quarter

- UK – Boom Williams 6 yd run (Austin MacGinnis kick), 11:49 (AUB 23–17)
- UK – Austin MacGinnis 32 yd field goal, 1:03 (AUB 23–20)

Fourth Quarter

- AUB – Peyton Barber 3 yd run (Daniel Carlson kick), 7:56 (AUB 30–20)
- UK – Mikel Horton 1 yd run (Austin MacGinnis kick), 4:06 (AUB 30–27)

Top Passers

- AUB − Sean White 17–27, 255 yds
- UK − Patrick Towles 27–44, 359 yds, 1 INT

Top Rushers

- AUB − Peyton Barber 26 carries, 92 yds, 2 TD
- UK − Boom Williams 16 carries, 113 yds, 2 TD

Top Receiving

- AUB − Ricardo Louis 7 receptions, 154 yds
- UK − Garrett Johnson 9 receptions, 160 yds

After their only bye week, Auburn went to Lexington, Kentucky to face the Kentucky Wildcats on a Thursday night. It was a great game for both teams. Kentucky had dropped passes and threw an interception in the end zone which cost the Wildcats. On the final, possible game-winning, drive for Kentucky, Auburn stopped them on 4th and 3 with almost 30 seconds left to win.

=== Arkansas ===
Auburn Tigers at Arkansas Razorbacks – Game summary

Quarter	1	2	3	4	OT	2OT	3OT	4OT	Total
Auburn	0	7	7	10	7	7	8	0	46
Arkansas	7	7	7	3	7	7	8	8	54

at Donald W. Reynolds Razorback Stadium • Fayetteville, Arkansas

- Date: October 24, 2015
- Game time: 11:01 a.m.
- Game weather: Temperature: 58 °F (14 °C) • Wind NNW 8 mph (13 km/h) • Weather: Mostly Cloudy
- Game attendance: 72,008
- Referee: Matt Austin
- TV announcers (SEC Network): Tom Hart (play-by-play), Andre Ware (analyst), Kevin Weidl (sideline reporter)

Game information

First Quarter

- ARK – Dominique Reed 11 yd run (Cole Hedlund kick), 11:33 (ARK 7–0)

Second Quarter

- ARK – Jeremy Sprinkle 23 yd pass from Brandon Allen (Cole Hedlund kick), 14:22 (ARK 14–0)
- AUB – Peyton Barber 1 yd run (Daniel Carlson kick), 0:30 (ARK 14–7)

Third Quarter

- AUB – Jason Smith 9 yd run (Daniel Carlson kick), 9:09 (TIE 14–14)
- ARK – Alex Collins 7 yd run (Cole Hedlund kick), 2:14 (ARK 21–14)

Fourth Quarter

- AUB – Jeremy Johnson 1 yd run (Daniel Carlson kick), 6:54 (TIE 21–21)
- ARK – Cole Hedlund 25 yd field goal, 1:07 (ARK 24–21)
- AUB – Daniel Carlson 41 yd field goal, 0:04 (TIE 24–24)

Overtime

- AUB – Peyton Barber 2 yd run (Daniel Carlson kick), 0:00 (AUB 31–24)
- ARK – Drew Morgan 6 yd pass from Brandon Allen (Cole Hedlund kick), 0:00 (TIE 31–31)

2nd Overtime

- ARK – Kody Walker 3 yd run (Cole Hedlund kick), 0:00 (ARK 38–31)
- AUB – Peyton Barber 2 yd run (Daniel Carlson kick), 0:00 (TIE 38–38)

3rd Overtime

- AUB – Peyton Barber 1 yd run (Melvin Ray pass from Sean White for 2 pt conversion), 0:00 (AUB 46–38)
- ARK – Kody Walker 4 yd run (Jeremy Sprinkle pass from Brandon Allen for 2 pt conversion), 0:00 (TIE 46–46)

4th Overtime

- ARK – Drew Morgan 25 yd pass from Brandon Allen (Kody Walker pass from Brandon Allen for 2 pt conversion), 0:00 (ARK 54–46)

Top Passers

- AUB − Sean White 19–32, 254 yds
- ARK − Brandon Allen 19–31, 233 yds, 3 TD, 1 INT

Top Rushers

- AUB − Peyton Barber 37 carries, 120 yds, 4 TD
- ARK − Alex Collins 25 carries, 105 yds, 1 TD

Top Receiving

- AUB − Ricardo Louis 6 receptions, 79 yds
- ARK − Drew Morgan 6 receptions, 56 yds, 2 TD

The seventh game of the season was against the Arkansas Razorbacks, where dropped passes hurt Auburn as the Tigers fell in 4 overtimes. Now the Tigers lead the all-time series 13–11–1.

=== Ole Miss ===
#19 Ole Miss Rebels at Auburn Tigers – Game summary

Quarter	1	2	3	4	Total
#19 Ole Miss	3	7	10	7	27
Auburn	3	7	3	6	19

at Jordan–Hare Stadium • Auburn, Alabama

- Date: October 31, 2015
- Game time: 11:01 a.m.
- Game weather: Temperature: 65 °F (18 °C) • Wind SE 6 mph (9.7 km/h) • Weather: Cloudy
- Game attendance: 87,451
- Referee: Matt Loeffler
- TV announcers (ESPN): Dave Pasch (play-by-play), Brian Griese (analyst), Tom Luginbill (sideline reporter)

Game information

First Quarter

- MISS – Gary Wunderlich 27 yd field goal, 8:30 (MISS 3–0)
- AUB – Daniel Carlson 52 yd field goal, 3:52 (TIE 3–3)

Second Quarter

- AUB – Ricardo Louis 47 yd pass from Sean White (Daniel Carlson kick), 14:11 (AUB 10–3)
- MISS – Akeem Judd 25 yd run (Gary Wunderlich kick), 3:59 (TIE 10–10)

Third Quarter

- MISS – Gary Wunderlich 37 yd field goal, 12:20 (MISS 13–10)
- AUB – Daniel Carlson 23 yd field goal, 3:46 (TIE 13–13)
- MISS – Derrick Jones 45 yd pass from Chad Kelly (Gary Wunderlich kick), 1:54 (MISS 20–13)

Fourth Quarter

- AUB – Daniel Carlson 33 yd field goal, 14:34 (MISS 20–16)
- AUB – Daniel Carlson 27 yd field goal, 12:00 (MISS 20–19)
- MISS – Laquon Treadwell 21 yd pass from Chad Kelly (Gary Wunderlich kick), 10:13 (MISS 27–19)

Top Passers

- MISS − Chad Kelly 33–51, 381 yds, 2 TD, 2 INT
- AUB − Sean White 12–28, 258 yds, 1 TD, 1 INT

Top Rushers

- MISS − Jaylen Walton 20 carries, 78 yds
- AUB − Jovon Robinson 18 carries, 91 yds

Top Receiving

- MISS − Domore'ea Stringfellow 8 receptions, 71 yds
- AUB − Ricardo Louis 4 receptions, 137 yds, 1 TD

The eighth game of the season was against Ole Miss. Auburn struggled in the red zone and had to settle for field goals rather than touchdowns. Many people thought bad coaching and play calls contributed to the 27–19 loss. The Tigers now lead the series 29–11–0.

=== Texas A&M ===
Auburn Tigers at #25 Texas A&M Aggies – Game summary

Quarter	1	2	3	4	Total
Auburn	7	7	6	6	26
#25 Texas A&M	3	0	7	0	10

at Kyle Field • College Station, Texas

- Date: November 7, 2015
- Game time: 6:39 p.m.
- Game weather: Temperature: 63 °F (17 °C) • Wind: NNE 15 mph (24 km/h) • Weather: Rainy
- Game attendance: 104,625
- Referee: Ken Williamson
- TV announcers (SEC Network): Brent Musburger (play-by-play), Jesse Palmer (analyst), Maria Taylor (sideline reporter)

Game information

First Quarter

- TA&M – Taylor Bertolet 50 yd field goal, 11:25 (TA&M 3–0)
- AUB – Marcus Davis 9 yd pass from Jeremy Johnson (Daniel Carlson kick), 6:42 (AUB 7–3)

Second Quarter

- AUB – Jovon Robinson 1 yd run (Daniel Carlson kick), 13:40 (AUB 14–3)

Third Quarter

- AUB – Daniel Carlson 35 yd field goal, 12:29 (AUB 17–3)
- AUB – Daniel Carlson 30 yd field goal, 7:56 (AUB 20–3)
- TA&M- Speedy Noil 2 yd pass from Jake Hubenak (Taylor Bertolet kick), 2:23 (AUB 20–10)

Fourth Quarter

- AUB – Daniel Carlson 21 yd field goal, 13:39 (AUB 23–10)
- AUB – Daniel Carlson 31 yd field goal, 6:33 (AUB 26–10)

Top Passers

- AUB − Jeremy Johnson 13–17, 132 yds, 1 TD
- TA&M − Kyler Murray 13–23, 105 yds, 3 INT

Top Rushers

- AUB − Jovon Robinson 27 carries, 159 yds, 1 TD
- TA&M − Tra Carson 21 carries, 109 yds

Top Receiving

- AUB − Marcus Davis 4 receptions, 10 yds, 1 TD
- TA&M − Christian Kirk 7 receptions, 44 yds

The ninth contest of the season was a trip to Texas to face Texas A&M. Auburn had their best game of the season, according to head coach Gus Malzahn. The defense was especially great, forcing 3 turnovers, all interceptions, 2 of which were inside Auburn's 5 yard line. The win meant Auburn was 1 win away from bowl eligibility. Jeremy Johnson started in place of an injured Sean White, making his first start since the LSU game on September 19. The Aggies now lead the series 4–2–0.

=== Georgia ===
Georgia Bulldogs at Auburn Tigers – Game summary

Quarter	1	2	3	4	Total
Georgia	0	3	7	10	20
Auburn	7	3	0	3	13

at Jordan–Hare Stadium • Auburn, Alabama

- Date: November 14, 2015
- Game time: 11:08 a.m.
- Game weather: Temperature: 60 °F (16 °C) • Wind NE 8 mph (13 km/h) • Weather: Sunny
- Game attendance: 87,451
- Referee: John McDaid
- TV announcers (CBS): Carter Blackburn (play-by-play), Aaron Taylor (analyst), Jenny Dell (sideline reporter)

Game information

First Quarter

- AUB – Kerryon Johnson 7 yd run (Daniel Carlson kick), 10:24 (AUB 7–0)

Second Quarter

- UGA – Marshall Morgan 40 yd field goal, 4:00 (AUB 7–3)
- AUB – Daniel Carlson 42 yd field goal, 0:34 (AUB 10–3)

Third Quarter

- UGA – Isaiah McKenzie 4 yd run (Marshall Morgan kick), 1:20 (TIE 10–10)

Fourth Quarter

- UGA – Isaiah McKenzie 53 yd punt return (Marshall Morgan kick), 9:28 (UGA 17–10)
- UGA – Marshall Morgan 38 yd field goal, 6:49 (UGA 20–10)
- AUB – Daniel Carlson 38 yd field goal, 1:14 (UGA 20–13)

Top Passers

- UGA − Greyson Lambert 12–17, 97 yds
- AUB − Jeremy Johnson 14–22, 61 yds, 1 INT

Top Rushers

- UGA − Sony Michel 26 carries, 77 yds
- AUB − Jovon Robinson 12 carries, 93 yds

Top Receiving

- UGA − Jeb Blazevich 3 receptions, 19 yds
- AUB − Marcus Davis 8 receptions, 31 yds

In the tenth game of the season, Auburn face off against rival Georgia. Auburn's passing game was not good in this ballgame. The Tigers blew a 10–3 halftime lead, and lost 20–13. A late Ricardo Louis fumble at the UGA 1 cost the Tigers greatly. The overall series record is 55–56–8.

=== Idaho ===
Idaho Vandals at Auburn Tigers – Game summary

Quarter	1	2	3	4	Total
Idaho	7	10	3	14	34
Auburn	14	21	14	7	56

at Jordan–Hare Stadium • Auburn, Alabama

- Date: November 21, 2015
- Game time: 3:01 p.m.
- Game weather: Temperature: 64 °F (18 °C) • Wind: Calm • Weather: Partly cloudy
- Game attendance: 87,451
- Referee: James Carter
- TV announcers (SEC Network Alternate): Mike Couzens (play-by-play), Cole Cubelic (analyst), Kevin Weidl (sideline reporter)

Game information

First Quarter
Second Quarter
Third Quarter
Fourth Quarter

Top Passers

- IDA −
- AUB −

Top Rushers

- IDA −
- AUB −

Top Receiving

- IDA −
- AUB −

The eleventh game of the season was against the Idaho Vandals. Behind Jeremy Johnson's 4 touchdowns, the offense put a season high 56 points on the scoreboard as they cruised to a 56–34 win. The win gave the Tigers their sixth win of the season, giving them bowl eligibility.

=== Alabama ===
#2 Alabama Crimson Tide at Auburn Tigers – Game summary

Quarter	1	2	3	4	Total
#2 Alabama	3	9	7	10	29
Auburn	6	0	7	0	13

at Jordan–Hare Stadium • Auburn, Alabama

- Date: November 28, 2015
- Game time: 2:40 p.m.
- Game weather: Temperature: 73° • Wind SE 5 mph (8.0 km/h) • Weather: Sunny
- Game attendance: 87,451
- Referee: Tom Ritter
- TV announcers (CBS): Verne Lundquist (play-by-play), Gary Danielson (analyst), Allie LaForce (sideline reporter)

Game information

First Quarter
Second Quarter
Third Quarter
Fourth Quarter

Top Passers

- ALA −
- AUB −

Top Rushers

- ALA −
- AUB −

Top Receiving

- ALA −
- AUB −

In the twelfth and final game of the regular season, Auburn will take on arch-rival Alabama. Their last meeting ended in a 55–44 loss for the Tigers in the 2014 season. Alabama leads the all-time series 43–35–1.

=== Memphis ===
2015 Birmingham Bowl
Auburn Tigers vs. Memphis Tigers (Birmingham Bowl) – Game summary

Quarter	1	2	3	4	Total
Auburn	10	0	7	14	31
Memphis	0	10	0	0	10

at Legion Field • Birmingham, Alabama

- Date: December 30, 2015
- Game time: 11:03 a.m.
- Game weather: Temperature: 56 • Wind NNW 2 mph (3.2 km/h) • Weather: Cloudy/Rain
- Game attendance: 59,430
- Referee: Jeff Heaser
- TV announcers (ESPN): Beth Mowins (play-by-play), Anthony Becht (analyst), Paul Carcaterra (sideline reporter)
- Recap

Game information

First Quarter
Second Quarter
Third Quarter
Fourth Quarter

Top Passers

- AUB –
- MEM –

Top Rushers

- AUB –
- MEM –

Top Receiving

- AUB –
- MEM –

== Rankings ==
Ranking movements Legend: ██ Increase in ranking ██ Decrease in ranking — = Not ranked RV = Received votes
	Week															
Poll	Pre	1	2	3	4	5	6	7	8	9	10	11	12	13	14	Final
AP	6	6	18	RV	—	—	—	—	—	—	—	—	—	—	—	—
Coaches	7	7	15	25	RV	—	—	—	—	—	—	—	—	—	—	—
CFP	Not released									—	—	—	—	—	—	Not released
