= List of 2016 NFL draft early entrants =

This list consists of college football players who forfeited remaining collegiate eligibility and were declared by the National Football League (NFL) as eligible to be selected in the 2016 NFL draft. This includes juniors and redshirt sophomores who completed high school at least three years prior to the draft. A player that meets these requirements can renounce his remaining NCAA eligibility and enter the draft. Players had until January 18, 2016, to declare their intention to forgo their remaining collegiate eligibility.

== Complete list of players ==
The following players were granted special eligibility to enter the 2016 draft:

Name	Position	School	Year	Team and Jersey Number	Pick
Bralon Addison	WR	Oregon	Junior (redshirt)	Denver Broncos (#2)	Undrafted
Roberto Aguayo	K	Florida State	Junior (redshirt)	Tampa Bay Buccaneers (#19)	59
Dominique Alexander	LB	Oklahoma	Junior	Cleveland Browns (#54)	Undrafted
Mackensie Alexander	CB	Clemson	Sophomore (redshirt)	Minnesota Vikings (#20)	54
Eli Apple	CB	Ohio State	Sophomore (redshirt)	New York Giants (#28)	10
Demarcus Ayers	WR	Houston	Junior	Pittsburgh Steelers (#82)	229
Peyton Barber	RB	Auburn	Sophomore (redshirt)	Tampa Bay Buccaneers (#43)	Undrafted
Vonn Bell	S	Ohio State	Junior	New Orleans Saints (#48)	61
Caleb Benenoch	OT	UCLA	Junior	Tampa Bay Buccaneers (#77)	148
Andrew Billings	DT	Baylor	Junior	Cincinnati Bengals (#75)	122
Dariusz Bladek	OG	Bethune-Cookman	Junior (redshirt)		Undrafted
Travis Blanks	LB	Clemson	Junior (redshirt)		Undrafted
Joey Bosa	DE	Ohio State	Junior	San Diego Chargers (#99)	3
Tyler Boyd	WR	Pittsburgh	Junior	Cincinnati Bengals (#82)	55
Daniel Braverman	WR	Western Michigan	Junior (redshirt)	Chicago Bears (#83)	230
Zac Brooks	RB	Clemson	Junior (redshirt)	Seattle Seahawks (#30)	247
Beniquez Brown	LB	Mississippi State	Junior (redshirt)	Green Bay Packers (#43)	Undrafted
Artie Burns	CB	Miami (FL)	Junior	Pittsburgh Steelers (#25)	25
Kenny Clark	DT	UCLA	Junior	Green Bay Packers (#97)	27
Corey Coleman	WR	Baylor	Junior (redshirt)	Cleveland Browns (#19)	15
Shon Coleman	OT	Auburn	Junior (redshirt)	Cleveland Browns (#72)	76
Trenton Coles	DB	Duquesne	Junior (redshirt)		Undrafted
Alex Collins	RB	Arkansas	Junior	Seattle Seahawks (#36)	171
Maliek Collins	DT	Nebraska	Junior	Dallas Cowboys (#96)	67
Jack Conklin	OT	Michigan State	Junior (redshirt)	Tennessee Titans (#78)	8
Pharoh Cooper	WR	South Carolina	Junior	Los Angeles Rams (#10)	117
Kamalei Correa	DE	Boise State	Junior	Baltimore Ravens (#51)	42
Su'a Cravens	LB	USC	Junior	Washington Redskins (#36)	53
Elijah Daniel	DT	Murray State	Junior		Undrafted
Terrell Davis	RB	British Columbia	Junior (redshirt)	Hamilton Tiger-Cats (#40)	CFL: R3, P21
Kevin Dodd	DE	Clemson	Junior (redshirt)	Tennessee Titans (#93)	33
Thomas Duarte	WR	UCLA	Junior	Miami Dolphins (#83)	231
Ezekiel Elliott	RB	Ohio State	Junior	Dallas Cowboys (#21)	4
Eric Enderson	P	Delaware	Junior (redshirt)		Undrafted
Leonard Floyd	LB	Georgia	Junior	Chicago Bears (#94)	9
Kendall Fuller	CB	Virginia Tech	Junior	Washington Redskins (#38)	84
Will Fuller	WR	Notre Dame	Junior	Houston Texans (#15)	21
Jared Goff	QB	California	Junior	Los Angeles Rams (#16)	1
T. J. Green	S	Clemson	Junior	Indianapolis Colts (#32)	57
David Grinnage	TE	NC State	Junior (redshirt)	Free Agent	Undrafted
Glenn Gronkowski	FB	Kansas State	Junior (redshirt)	Buffalo Bills (#48)	Undrafted
Christian Hackenberg	QB	Penn State	Junior	New York Jets (#5)	51
Vernon Hargreaves III	CB	Florida	Junior	Tampa Bay Buccaneers (#28)	10
Jerald Hawkins	OT	LSU	Junior (redshirt)	Pittsburgh Steelers (#65)	123
Ellis Henderson	WR	Montana	Junior (redshirt)		Undrafted
Derrick Henry	RB	Alabama	Junior	Tennessee Titans (#2)	45
Hunter Henry	TE	Arkansas	Junior	San Diego Chargers (#86)	35
Willie Henry	DT	Michigan	Junior (redshirt)	Baltimore Ravens (#69)	132
Rashard Higgins	WR	Colorado State	Junior	Cleveland Browns (#81)	172
Austin Hooper	TE	Stanford	Sophomore (redshirt)	Atlanta Falcons (#81)	81
Jordan Howard	RB	Indiana	Junior	Chicago Bears (#24)	150
Xavien Howard	CB	Baylor	Junior (redshirt)	Miami Dolphins (#25)	38
Germain Ifedi	OT	Texas A&M	Junior (redshirt)	Seattle Seahawks (#76)	31
Myles Jack	LB	UCLA	Junior	Jacksonville Jaguars (#44)	36
Quinton Jefferson	DT	Maryland	Junior (redshirt)	Seattle Seahawks (#99)	147
Austin Johnson	DT	Penn State	Junior (redshirt)	Tennessee Titans (#94)	43
Cardale Jones	QB	Ohio State	Junior (redshirt)	Buffalo Bills (#7)	139
Cayleb Jones	WR	Arizona	Junior (redshirt)		
Chris Jones	DT	Mississippi State	Junior		
Jayron Kearse	S	Clemson	Junior	Minnesota Vikings (#27)	244
Denver Kirkland	OG	Arkansas	Junior		
Darius Latham	DT	Indiana	Junior		
Kenny Lawler	WR	California	Junior (redshirt)		
Shaq Lawson	DE	Clemson	Junior		
Darron Lee	LB	Ohio State	Sophomore (redshirt)	New York Jets (#50)	20
Roger Lewis	WR	Bowling Green	Sophomore (redshirt)		
Steve Longa	LB	Rutgers	Junior (redshirt)		
Paxton Lynch	QB	Memphis	Junior (redshirt)	Denver Broncos (#12)	26
Jalin Marshall	WR	Ohio State	Sophomore (redshirt)	New York Jets (#89)	Undrafted
Alex McCalister	DE	Florida	Junior		
Brett McMakin	LB	Northern Iowa	Junior (redshirt)		
Keanu Neal	S	Florida	Junior		
Yannick Ngakoue	DE	Maryland	Junior		
Robert Nkemdiche	DT	Ole Miss	Junior	Arizona Cardinals (#90)	29
Marquez North	WR	Tennessee	Junior		
Emmanuel Ogbah	DE	Oklahoma State	Junior (redshirt)		
Paul Perkins	RB	UCLA	Junior (redshirt)		
Tyvis Powell	S	Ohio State	Junior (redshirt)		
C. J. Prosise	RB	Notre Dame	Junior (redshirt)		
Jalen Ramsey (Note: "FSU's Jalen Ramsey to enter 2016 NFL draft". WTSP. January 6, 2016.)	DB	Florida State	Junior	Jacksonville Jaguars (#20)	5
Alex Redmond	OG	UCLA	Junior		
Hassan Ridgeway	DT	Texas	Junior		
A'Shawn Robinson	DT	Alabama	Junior		
Demarcus Robinson	WR	Florida	Junior		
Rashard Robinson	CB	LSU	Junior		
Aldrick Rosas	K	Southern Oregon	Junior		
KeiVarae Russell	CB	Notre Dame	Junior (redshirt)		
Zack Sanchez	CB	Oklahoma	Junior (redshirt)	Carolina Panthers (#31)	141
Isaac Seumalo	OG	Oregon State	Junior (redshirt)		
Wendell Smallwood	RB	West Virginia	Junior	Philadelphia Eagles (#28)	153
Jaylon Smith	LB	Notre Dame	Junior	Dallas Cowboys (#54)	34
Tyrell Smith	OT	Massachusetts	Junior (redshirt)		
Noah Spence	DE	Eastern Kentucky	Junior (redshirt)	Tampa Bay Buccaneers (#57)	39
Ronnie Stanley	OT	Notre Dame	Junior (redshirt)		
Kelvin Taylor	RB	Florida	Junior		
Michael Thomas	WR	Ohio State	Junior (redshirt)	New Orleans Saints (#13)	47
Ron Thompson	DE	Syracuse	Junior		
Corey Tindal	DB	Marshall	Junior (redshirt)		
Laquon Treadwell	WR	Ole Miss	Junior	Minnesota Vikings (#11)	23
Laremy Tunsil	OT	Ole Miss	Junior	Miami Dolphins (#67)	13
Vincent Valentine	DT	Nebraska	Junior (redshirt)		
Quinn van Gylswyk	K	British Columbia	Junior		
Nick Vigil	LB	Utah State	Junior (redshirt)		
Cleveland Wallace III	CB	San Jose State	Junior (redshirt)		
Dwayne Washington	RB	Washington	Junior (redshirt)		
Stephen Weatherly	LB	Vanderbilt	Junior (redshirt)		
De'Runnya Wilson	WR	Mississippi State	Junior		
Daryl Worley	CB	West Virginia	Junior		
Scooby Wright III	LB	Arizona	Junior		
Avery Young	OT	Auburn	Junior (redshirt)		
