= 2015 Birmingham Bowl =

2015 Birmingham Bowl can refer to:

- 2015 Birmingham Bowl (January), played as part of the 2014–15 college football bowl season between the East Carolina Pirates and the Florida Gators
- 2015 Birmingham Bowl (December), played as part of the 2015–16 college football bowl season between the Auburn Tigers and the Memphis Tigers
