= Shon Coleman =

American football player (born 1991)

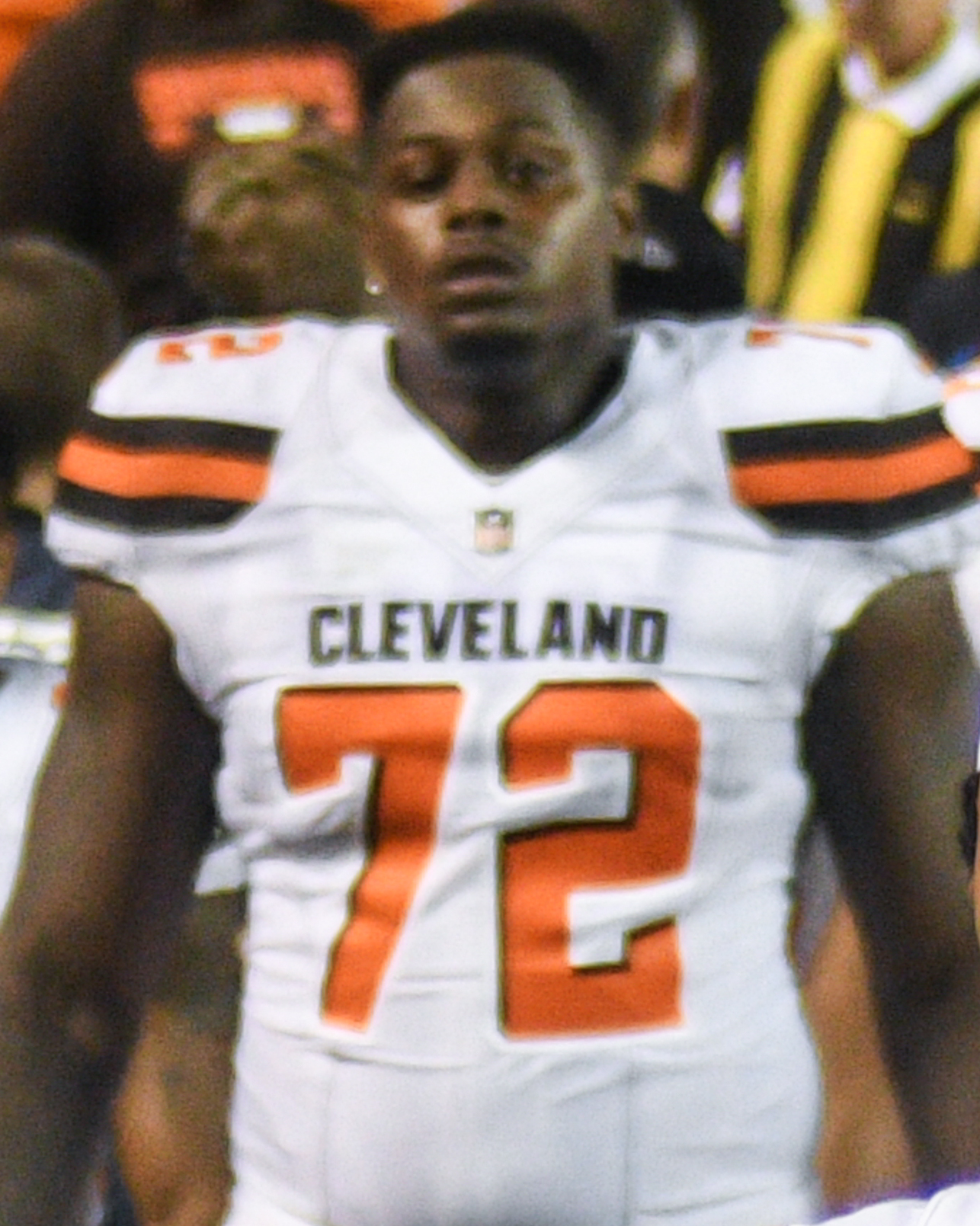
- Coleman with the Cleveland Browns in 2017

No. 72
- Position: Offensive tackle

Personal information
- Born: November 25, 1991 (age 34); Memphis, Tennessee, U.S.
- Listed height: 6 ft 5 in (1.96 m)
- Listed weight: 310 lb (141 kg)

Career information
- High school: Olive Branch (Olive Branch, Mississippi)
- College: Auburn (2011-2015)
- NFL draft: 2016: 3rd round, 76th overall pick

Career history
- Cleveland Browns (2016–2017); San Francisco 49ers (2018–2020); Indianapolis Colts (2021–2022)*; Chicago Bears (2022)*
- * Offseason or practice squad member only

Awards and highlights
- Second-team All-SEC (2015)

Career NFL statistics
- Games played: 23
- Games started: 16
- Stats at Pro Football Reference

Shon Coleman (born November 25, 1991) is an American former professional football player who was an offensive tackle in the National Football League (NFL). He played college football for the Auburn Tigers.

== Early life ==
Born in Memphis, Tennessee to Travis Tunstall and De Keishia Coleman-Tunstall, Coleman attended Olive Branch High School in Olive Branch, Mississippi. He was the top rated player in the state of Mississippi and the 3rd ranked offensive lineman in the country according to Rivals.com in his senior year. He also played in both the US Army All-American Game and the Mississippi-Alabama All-Star Game. Coleman had 30+ scholarship offers with notable schools being mainly from the Southeastern Conferencealong with USC, Oklahoma State, Miami, etc. Coleman took official visits to Miami, Alabama, Ole Miss, Auburn, and Arkansas. Coleman verbally committed to Auburn University in early 2009 to play college football. Coleman signed his national letter of intent to play at Auburn in February 2010. A few weeks after signing with Auburn, Coleman was diagnosed with leukemia. Coleman beat leukemia, and during the 2014 NFL draft, he announced the 13th pick of the draft which turned out to be multiple time first team All-Pro and NFL Defensive Player of the Year recipient, Aaron Donald.

== College career ==
Coleman did not play his first two years at Auburn (2011, 2012) as he was undergoing treatment for the leukemia. After beating leukemia, he earned his first playing time in 2013 as the backup left tackle to Greg Robinson. In the season of 2013, Coleman helped lead Auburn to an Southeastern Conference (SEC) Championship win and a spot in the 2014 BCS National Championship versus Florida State. In his sophomore year in 2014, Coleman became a starter for the first time. He performed at a high level his junior year, receiving 2nd Team ALL-SEC and rising up NFL draft boards. During his junior year, he became 2nd Team All-SEC, and was a top offensive lineman prospect for the draft. After his junior year in 2015, he entered the 2016 NFL draft.

At the conclusion of the 2015 football season, Coleman received his Master's Degree in Adult Education from Auburn.

== Professional career ==
=== Pre-draft ===
Pre-draft measurables
Height	Weight	Arm length	Hand span	Bench press
6 ft 5 1/2 in (1.97 m)	307 lb (139 kg)	35 1/8 in (0.89 m)	10 5/8 in (0.27 m)	22 reps
All values from NFL Combine

Entering the 2016 NFL draft, some analysts had Coleman projected to be selected in the second round and some mock drafts by NFL analysts had him going in the late first or early second round. He was rated the eighth best offensive lineman by NFLDraftScout.com and was invited to participate at the NFL Scouting Combine. Since he was still recovering from a knee injury he suffered in 2015, he was unable to run positional drills. The only physical workout he performed was the bench press, where he was able to do 22 reps. On March 7, 2016, he attended Auburn's Pro Day along with 13 other prospects, including teammates Jonathan Jones, Ricardo Louis, Peyton Barber, Duke Williams, and Blake Countess. Representatives and scouts from all 32 NFL teams - except the Arizona Cardinals - showed up, including Bill Belichick and Doug Whaley. His positive attributes were his upper body strength, long arms, above average playing strength, versatility playing both tackle positions, strong hands, and run blocking abilities. The only concerns among scouts and teams were his past medical issues, his age as a 25-year old rookie, a wide base effecting balance, blocking technique, and inconsistent footwork.

=== Cleveland Browns ===
The Cleveland Browns selected Coleman in third round (76th overall) in the 2016 NFL draft. On June 6, he signed a four-year contract worth about $3.13 million, which included a signing bonus worth about $788,000. He missed spring training camp due to ongoing rehabilitation with his knee, joining practice only on July 30. Coleman began the regular season as the backup right tackle to Austin Pasztor.

In 2017, Coleman earned the starting right tackle job, starting all 16 games.

=== San Francisco 49ers ===
Coleman was traded to the San Francisco 49ers on August 31, 2018 in exchange for a seventh-round pick in the 2019 NFL draft.

In the first preseason game of 2019, Coleman suffered an ankle injury and underwent surgery to repair a dislocated ankle and fractured fibula. He was placed on injured reserve on August 12, 2019, ending his season. Without Coleman, the 49ers reached Super Bowl LIV, but they lost 31–20 to the Kansas City Chiefs.

Coleman re-signed with the 49ers on a one-year contract on March 16, 2020. On August 6, 2020, Coleman announced he would opt out of the 2020 season due to the COVID-19 pandemic.

On August 31, 2021, Coleman was placed on injured reserve. He was released on September 10, 2021.

=== Indianapolis Colts ===
On January 4, 2022, Coleman was signed to the practice squad of the Indianapolis Colts. He signed a reserve/future contract on January 10, 2022. He was released on May 10, 2022.

=== Chicago Bears ===
On May 17, 2022, Coleman signed with the Chicago Bears. He was released on August 30, 2022.
