= David Rivers (cornerback) =

American football player (born 1994)

No. 27, 37
- Position: Cornerback

Personal information
- Born: July 23, 1994 (age 32); Miami, Florida, U.S.
- Listed height: 6 ft 0 in (1.83 m)
- Listed weight: 185 lb (84 kg)

Career information
- High school: American (Hialeah, Florida)
- College: Youngstown State
- NFL draft: 2017: undrafted

Career history
- Green Bay Packers (2017)*; New York Jets (2017)*; Tampa Bay Buccaneers (2017)*; Miami Dolphins (2017)*; Tampa Bay Buccaneers (2017–2018); Miami Dolphins (2019)*; New York Guardians (2020)*; St. Louis BattleHawks (2020); Winnipeg Blue Bombers (2021); New Jersey Generals (2022); Montreal Alouettes (2023)*
- * Offseason or practice squad member only
- Stats at Pro Football Reference

David Rivers (born July 23, 1994) is an American former professional football cornerback who played for the Tampa Bay Buccaneers of the National Football League (NFL). He played college football at Youngstown State.

He is currently the defensive backs coach at Franklin Pierce University.

== Professional career ==
=== Green Bay Packers ===
Rivers signed with the Green Bay Packers as an undrafted free agent on May 5, 2017. He was waived by the Packers on June 7, 2017.

=== New York Jets ===
On July 30, 2017, Rivers was signed by the New York Jets. He was waived by the Jets on September 1, 2017.

=== Tampa Bay Buccaneers ===
On September 19, 2017, Rivers was signed to the Tampa Bay Buccaneers' practice squad. He was released on November 15, 2017, but was re-signed a week later. He was released again on November 28, 2017.

=== Miami Dolphins ===
On December 5, 2017, Rivers was signed to the Miami Dolphins' practice squad.

=== Tampa Bay Buccaneers (second stint) ===
On December 20, 2017, Rivers was signed by the Buccaneers off the Dolphins' practice squad.

On August 8, 2018, Rivers was waived/injured by the Buccaneers and placed on injured reserve. He was released on August 14, 2018. On October 16, 2018, Rivers was re-signed to the Buccaneers practice squad. He was promoted to the active roster on November 28, 2018.

On May 24, 2019, the Buccaneers waived Rivers.

=== Miami Dolphins (second stint) ===
On July 23, 2019, Rivers was signed by the Miami Dolphins. He was released during final roster cuts on August 31, 2019.

=== New York Guardians ===
Rivers was drafted in the 3rd round during phase four in the 2020 XFL draft by the New York Guardians.

=== St. Louis BattleHawks ===
On January 17, 2020, Rivers was traded to the St. Louis BattleHawks, along with offensive tackle Brian Wallace, in exchange for offensive linemen Dejon Allen and Avery Young. He had his contract terminated when the league suspended operations on April 10, 2020.

=== Winnipeg Blue Bombers ===
Rivers signed with the Winnipeg Blue Bombers of the CFL on July 9, 2021.

=== New Jersey Generals ===
Rivers was selected in the 10th round of the 2022 USFL draft by the New Jersey Generals.

=== Montreal Alouettes ===
On April 26, 2023, Rivers signed with the Montreal Alouettes of the Canadian Football League (CFL). On June 3, 2023, Rivers was released by the Alouettes.

== Coaching career ==
=== Franklin Pierce University ===
Rivers was named the defensive backs coach at Franklin Pierce University in 2025.
