= Tom Cox (American football) =

American football player (1962–2020)

No. 72
- Position: Center

Personal information
- Born: December 4, 1962; Xenia, Ohio, U.S.
- Died: May 13, 2020 (aged 57)
- Listed height: 6 ft 5 in (1.96 m)
- Listed weight: 260 lb (118 kg)

Career information
- High school: Xenia (Xenia, Ohio)
- College: USC

Career history
- Los Angeles Rams (1987)

Career statistics
- Games played: 3
- Stats at Pro Football Reference

Thomas Franklin Cox (December 4, 1962 – May 13, 2020) was an American professional football center who played one season for the Los Angeles Rams of the National Football League (NFL). He played college football at USC.

== Early life and education ==
Tom Cox was born on December 4, 1962, in Xenia, Ohio. He grew up in Xenia playing baseball, basketball football, and track. He attended high school at Xenia before going to college at USC. He spent 1981 to 1985 playing center for their football team, the Trojans. He was part of their 1985 Rose Bowl team.

== Professional career ==
After not playing in 1986, he was signed in '87 by the Los Angeles Rams. He was signed a replacement player during the 1987 NFL strike. He was backup to Tony Slaton, a teammate at USC. An October 1987 article by The San Bernardino County Sun described him saying "Tom Cox didn't play much in the Rams 37-10 loss to New Orleans, basically on field goal and extra point units. And he knows that as soon as the strike ends, his NFL career is history, but for one day anyway, he was exactly where he'd always wanted to be." Cox said about his career, "I know I'll probably get released next week, but I feel like I finished something in my life." He also stated that he could "get on with his life" because he could now say "I was on an NFL roster". After playing in three games during the strike, he was released.

== Personal life and death ==
He had three sons. Each of them playing sports. His son Jordan played baseball at Cal Lutheran, Dakota played football at University of New Mexico, and Chandler played football at Auburn, and also playing professionally for the Miami Dolphins.

Cox died on May 13, 2020, at the age of 57.
