= Chandler Cox =

American football player (born 1996)

No. 38, 27
- Position: Fullback

Personal information
- Born: July 29, 1996 (age 30); Sandy, Utah, U.S.
- Listed height: 6 ft 1 in (1.85 m)
- Listed weight: 242 lb (110 kg)

Career information
- High school: Apopka (Apopka, Florida)
- College: Auburn (2015–2018)
- NFL draft: 2019: 7th round, 233rd overall pick

Career history
- Miami Dolphins (2019–2020)

Career NFL statistics
- Receptions: 2
- Receiving yards: 9
- Stats at Pro Football Reference

Chandler Duke Cox (born July 29, 1996) is an American former professional football player who was a fullback in the National Football League (NFL). He played college football for the Auburn Tigers.

== College career ==
After playing in a single-wing offense at Apopka High School, leading the team to a Florida state championship, Cox committed to Auburn on June 1, 2014. He played offense and special teams for Auburn. On offense, he was utilized as a blocking and receiving fullback, taking few carries over the course of his college career. He was a hybrid player that spent time at the tight end, wide receiver, halfback, upback and wildcat quarterback positions.

On January 2, 2017, Cox scored his first collegiate touchdown against Oklahoma in the Sugar Bowl. In 2018, Cox had a career high four receptions for 52 yards against Washington in the season opener.

== Professional career ==
Cox was selected by the Miami Dolphins in the seventh round (233rd overall) of the 2019 NFL draft. He made the opening roster after embracing being a blocker. On January 2, 2021, Cox was waived by the Dolphins.

== Career statistics ==
=== NFL ===
Year	Team	Games		Rushing					Receiving				
Year	Team	GP	GS	Att	Yds	Avg	Lng	TD	Rec	Yds	Avg	Lng	TD
2019	MIA	13	3	0	0	0.0	0	0	0	0	0.0	0	0
2020	MIA	8	3	0	0	0.0	0	0	2	9	4.5	6	0
Totals		21	6	0	0	0.0	0	0	2	9	4.5	6	0

=== College ===
Season	Team	Games		Rushing				Receiving			
Season	Team	GP	GS	Att	Yds	Avg	TD	Rec	Yds	Avg	TD
2015	Auburn	13	10	0	0	0.0	0	3	25	8.3	0
2016	Auburn	12	9	7	15	2.1	1	4	41	10.3	0
2017	Auburn	14	11	1	0	0.0	0	8	78	9.8	0
2018	Auburn	14	11	3	3	1.0	2	11	93	8.5	1
Career		52	41	11	18	1.6	3	26	237	9.1	1

== Personal life ==
Cox's father, Tom, played in the NFL for a part of the 1987 season. His older brother Dakota also played college football and spent time in training camp with the Minnesota Vikings.
