= Cassanova McKinzy =

American football player (born 1992)

Profile
- Position: Linebacker

Personal information
- Born: November 17, 1992 (age 34); Birmingham, Alabama, U.S.
- Listed height: 6 ft 3 in (1.91 m)
- Listed weight: 252 lb (114 kg)

Career information
- High school: Woodlawn (Birmingham, Alabama)
- College: Auburn (2012–2015)
- NFL draft: 2016: undrafted

Career history
- Tampa Bay Buccaneers (2016)*; Los Angeles Rams (2016–2017)*; Washington Redskins (2018–2019); Calgary Stampeders (2021–2022); Vegas Vipers (2023)
- * Offseason or practice squad member only

Career NFL statistics
- Total tackles: 2
- Sacks: 1.0
- Stats at Pro Football Reference

Cassanova McKinzy (born November 17, 1992) is an American football linebacker. He played college football at Auburn, and was signed by the Tampa Bay Buccaneers as an undrafted free agent in 2016.

== Early life ==
McKinzy is the son of Joann Brown and Charles Drake. He attended Woodlawn High School, where he played high school football for the Colonels.

== College career ==
A 4-star recruit, McKinzy committed to Auburn to play under head coach Gus Malzahn, over offers from Alabama, Arkansas, Arkansas State, Clemson, Florida State, Kansas, and UAB. He stated that a reason for rejecting Clemson was because there is no nearby Chick-fil-A. (McKinzy was mistaken; there is one on campus.) He played three seasons from 2012 to 2015.

== Professional career ==
Pre-draft measurables
Height	Weight	Arm length	Hand span	40-yard dash	10-yard split	20-yard split	20-yard shuttle	Three-cone drill	Broad jump	Bench press
6 ft 1 in (1.85 m)	248 lb (112 kg)	31 1/4 in (0.79 m)	9 7/8 in (0.25 m)	4.83 s	1.65 s	2.72 s	4.37 s	7.50 s	9 ft 10 in (3.00 m)	21 reps

=== Tampa Bay Buccaneers ===
McKinzy was signed by the Tampa Bay Buccaneers as an undrafted free agent following the 2016 NFL draft. On August 22, 2016, he was released by the team.

=== Los Angeles Rams ===
On January 3, 2017, McKinzy signed a reserve/future contract with the Los Angeles Rams. He was waived on September 2, 2017, and was signed to the Rams' practice squad the next day. He was released by the team on September 19, 2017.

=== Washington Redskins ===
On January 1, 2018, McKinzy signed a reserve/future contract with the Washington Redskins. He was released on April 30, 2018, but re-signed on August 6.

On September 1, 2018, McKinzy was waived for final roster cuts before the start of the 2018 season but signed to the team's practice squad the next day. He was promoted to the active roster on October 29, 2018, but was waived the next day and re-signed to the practice squad. He was promoted back to the active roster on November 9, 2018. He suffered a torn pectoral in Week 12 and was ruled out for the rest of the season.

On October 7, 2019, McKinzy was released by the Redskins and re-signed to the practice squad. His practice squad contract with the team expired on January 6, 2020.

=== Calgary Stampeders ===
McKinzy signed with the Calgary Stampeders of the CFL on June 16, 2021.

=== Vegas Vipers ===
McKinzy was drafted by the Vegas Vipers during the 2023 XFL draft.
