= Byron Cowart =

American football player (born 1996)

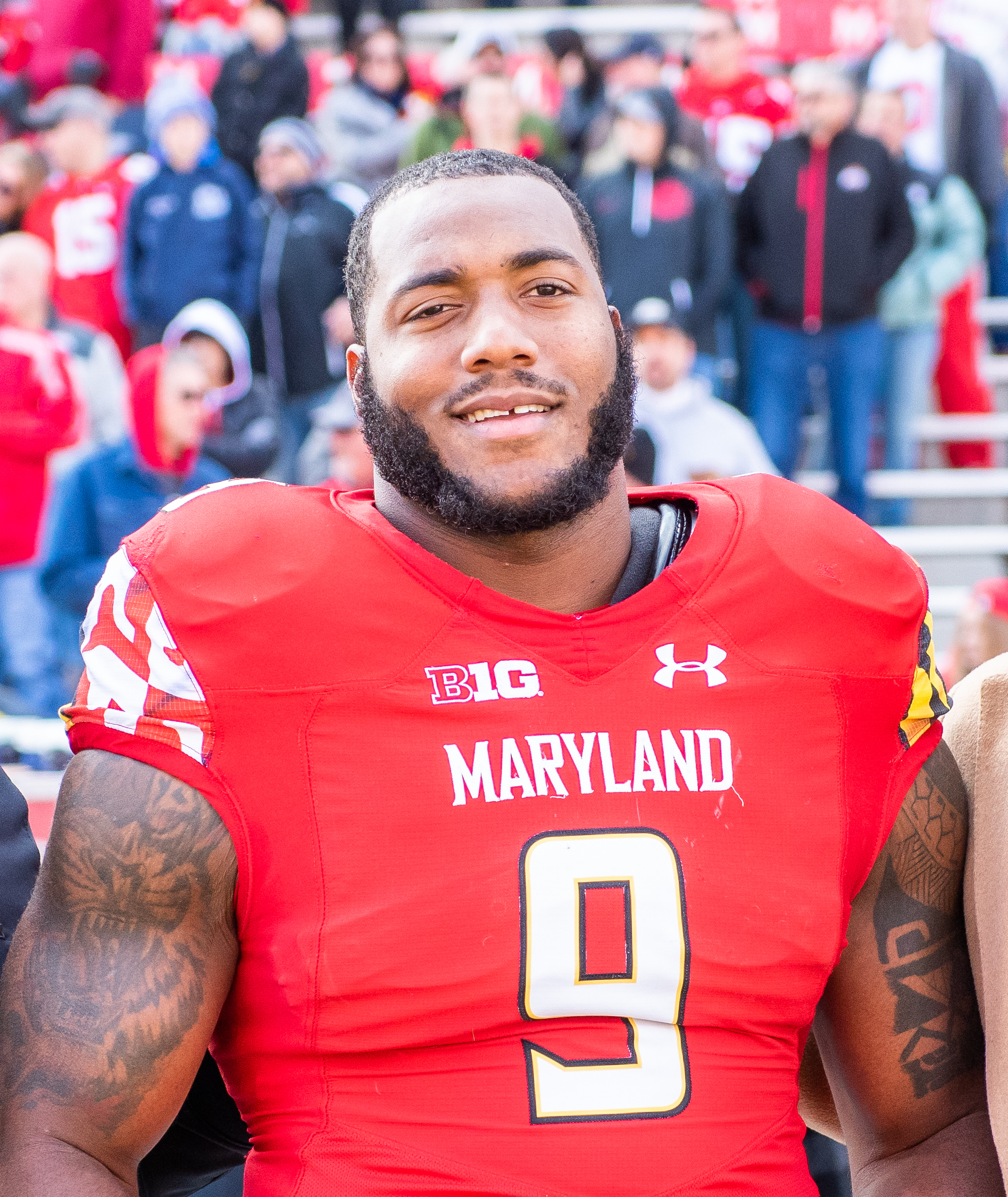
- Cowart with the Maryland Terrapins in 2018

No. 55 – Washington Commanders
- Position: Defensive tackle
- Roster status: Practice squad

Personal information
- Born: May 20, 1996 (age 30); Seffner, Florida, U.S.
- Listed height: 6 ft 3 in (1.91 m)
- Listed weight: 300 lb (136 kg)

Career information
- High school: Armwood (Seffner)
- College: Auburn (2015–2017); Maryland (2018)
- NFL draft: 2019: 5th round, 159th overall pick

Career history
- New England Patriots (2019–2021); Indianapolis Colts (2022); Kansas City Chiefs (2023)*; Houston Texans (2023)*; Miami Dolphins (2023)*; Chicago Bears (2024); New York Jets (2025); Washington Commanders (2026–present)
- * Offseason or practice squad member only

Career NFL statistics
- Tackles: 67
- Sacks: 3.5
- Pass deflections: 1
- Stats at Pro Football Reference

Byron Cowart (born May 20, 1996) is an American professional football defensive tackle for the Washington Commanders of the National Football League (NFL). Cowart played college football for the Maryland Terrapins and Auburn Tigers and was selected by the New England Patriots in the fifth round of the 2019 NFL draft.

== College career ==
Cowart was the top-ranked high school recruit and committed to Auburn in 2015. However he struggled to get playing time in his first two seasons. After appearing in the team's first two games, Cowart left Auburn early in the 2017 season and attended Hillsborough Community College (HCC) near his Florida home. In December he announced he was transferring to Maryland for the 2018 season.

== Professional career ==
Pre-draft measurables
Height	Weight	Arm length	Hand span	Wingspan	40-yard dash	10-yard split	20-yard split	20-yard shuttle	Three-cone drill	Vertical jump	Broad jump	Bench press
6 ft 3 in (1.91 m)	298 lb (135 kg)	33 3/4 in (0.86 m)	10 in (0.25 m)	6 ft 9 in (2.06 m)	5.07 s	1.74 s	2.95 s	4.62 s	7.66 s	30.0 in (0.76 m)	9 ft 3 in (2.82 m)	26 reps
All values from NFL Combine/Pro Day

=== New England Patriots ===
Cowart was selected by the New England Patriots in the fifth round (159th overall) of the 2019 NFL draft. He played in five games as a rookie.

Cowart was placed on the reserve/COVID-19 list by the team on October 12, 2020, and was activated on October 21. In Week 14 against the Los Angeles Rams on Thursday Night Football, Cowart recorded his first career sack on Jared Goff during the 24–3 loss.

On August 31, 2021, Cowart was placed on the reserve/physically unable to perform list to start the season. On July 22, 2022, the Patriots waived Cowart.

=== Indianapolis Colts ===
On July 23, 2022, Cowart was claimed by the Indianapolis Colts.

=== Kansas City Chiefs ===
Cowart signed with the Kansas City Chiefs on March 24, 2023. He was released by the Chiefs on May 10.

=== Houston Texans ===
On May 18, 2023, Cowart signed with the Houston Texans. He was released by the Texans on August 29.

=== Miami Dolphins ===
On September 19, 2023, Cowart was signed to the practice squad of the Miami Dolphins. He was not signed to a reserve/future contract after the season and thus became a free agent upon the expiration of his practice squad contract.

=== Chicago Bears ===
On March 18, 2024, Cowart signed with the Chicago Bears. He was released on August 27, and re-signed to the practice squad. Cowart was signed to the active roster in October 5.

=== New York Jets ===
On March 13, 2025, Cowart signed with the New York Jets. He was placed on injured reserve on August 26. Cowart was released by the Jets on December 2.

=== Washington Commanders ===
On August 11, 2026, Cowart signed with the Washington Commanders. He was released by Washington as a part of final roster cuts on August 30. Cowart was re–signed to the Commanders' practice squad the following day. He was activated to the Commanders 53-man roster following their Week 8 matchup against the Philadelphia Eagles and Daron Payne's season ending injury. He reverted to the practice squad following that game.
