= Blake Countess =

American football player (born 1993)

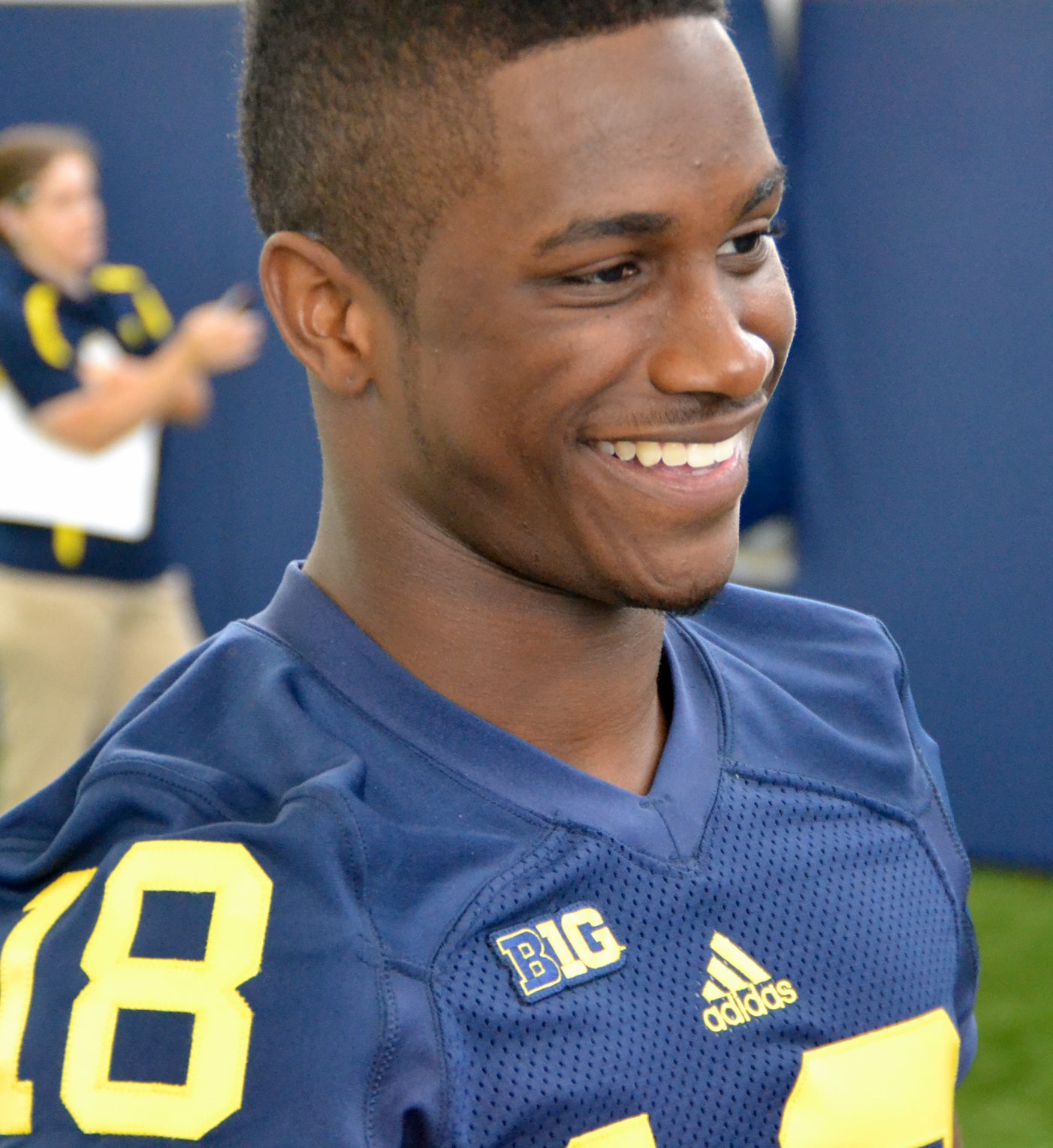
- Countess with the Michigan Wolverines in 2012

No. 24, 32, 33, 36, 26
- Position: Cornerback

Personal information
- Born: August 8, 1993 (age 33); Owings Mills, Maryland, U.S.
- Listed height: 5 ft 10 in (1.78 m)
- Listed weight: 185 lb (84 kg)

Career information
- High school: Our Lady of Good Counsel (Olney, Maryland)
- College: Michigan (2011–2014); Auburn (2015)
- NFL draft: 2016: 6th round, 196th overall pick

Career history
- Philadelphia Eagles (2016)*; Los Angeles Rams (2016–2018); Philadelphia Eagles (2019)*; New York Jets (2019); Philadelphia Eagles (2020); Baltimore Ravens (2021)*; Los Angeles Rams (2021); New Jersey Generals (2023)
- * Offseason or practice squad member only

Awards and highlights
- Super Bowl champion (LVI); First-team All-Big Ten (2013)

Career NFL statistics
- Total tackles: 57
- Sacks: 1
- Pass deflections: 3
- Interceptions: 2
- Total touchdowns: 2
- Stats at Pro Football Reference

Blake Countess (born August 8, 1993) is an American former professional football player who was a cornerback in the National Football League (NFL). He played college football for the Michigan Wolverines, using three years of eligibility between 2011 and 2014. He was an All-Big Ten Conference first-team selection in 2013 after missing most of 2012 due to injury. His 2014 season was less successful and he used his final year of eligibility as a graduate transfer at Auburn in 2015. He was selected by the Philadelphia Eagles in the sixth round of the 2016 NFL draft.

== Early life ==
Countess attended Our Lady of Good Counsel High School in Olney, Maryland. As a junior in 2009, he totaled over 50 tackles and 20 pass break-ups. In May 2010, he was nominated to play in the U.S. Army All-American Bowl high school football all-star game. As a senior in 2010, Countess averaged 14.7 yards per catch, 35 yards per kickoff return, and 22.9 yards per punt return for Good Counsel. Countess played both offense and defense for Good Counsel. His high school coach Bob Milloy noted: "What you're going to get from him is he's a lockdown corner, started both ways for me, and if you don't keep an eye on him, he'll run a punt or kickoff back. He's a very reliable, dependable kid, a good character person ... a good, solid citizen, great kid, and good football player."

During the 2010 recruiting season, Countess was pursued by many top collegiate football programs including Notre Dame, Stanford, Penn State, Michigan, Tennessee, Arkansas, Wisconsin, West Virginia, Pitt, Georgia Tech, Purdue, Maryland, Cincinnati, Louisville, Duke, Illinois, Virginia, and Wake Forest.

In early December 2010, Countess was selected as an Army All-American. At the U.S. Army All-American Bowl played on January 8, 2011, Countess did not allow a single pass completion to any receiver he covered, and the opposing quarterbacks chose not to throw many passes in his direction.

College recruiting
Name	Hometown	School	Height	Weight	40^{‡}	Commit date
Blake Countess; DB	Olney, Maryland	Our Lady of Good Counsel H.S.	5 ft 10 in (1.78 m)	172.5 lb (78.2 kg)	4.475	Dec 17, 2010
Blake Countess; DB	Recruit ratings: Scout: Rivals: (80)					
Overall recruit ranking: Scout: 20 (CB) Rivals: 133, 10 (CB), 3 (MD) ESPN: 14 (CB)
Note: In many cases, Scout, Rivals, 247Sports, On3, and ESPN may conflict in their listings of height and weight.; In these cases, the average was taken. ESPN grades are on a 100-point scale.; Sources: "Michigan Football Commitments". Rivals.; "2011 Michigan Football Commits". Scout.; "ESPN". ESPN.; "Scout.com Team Recruiting Rankings". Scout.; "2011 Team Ranking". Rivals.com.

On December 17, 2010, Countess announced his verbal commitment to attend the University of Michigan. He noted that, after visiting Ann Arbor, he "fell in love with Ann Arbor, the coaches, the school, the football legacy, the Big House, and it's just where I felt at home." He was regarded as the top prospect in Michigan's 2011 recruiting class. ESPN.com called him "a natural cover guy with good size and speed," and noted that he has "all the tools to be an outstanding player in college." Three weeks after Countess committed to Michigan, the school's head coach Rich Rodriguez was fired. After the firing, Countess's high school coach noted that the move was unlikely to effect Countess's commitment. He noted that Countess was aware of rumors about Rodriguez being fired before giving his commitment and noted, "He said he picked Michigan because of the school." He signed his letter of intent with Michigan in February 2011.

== College career ==
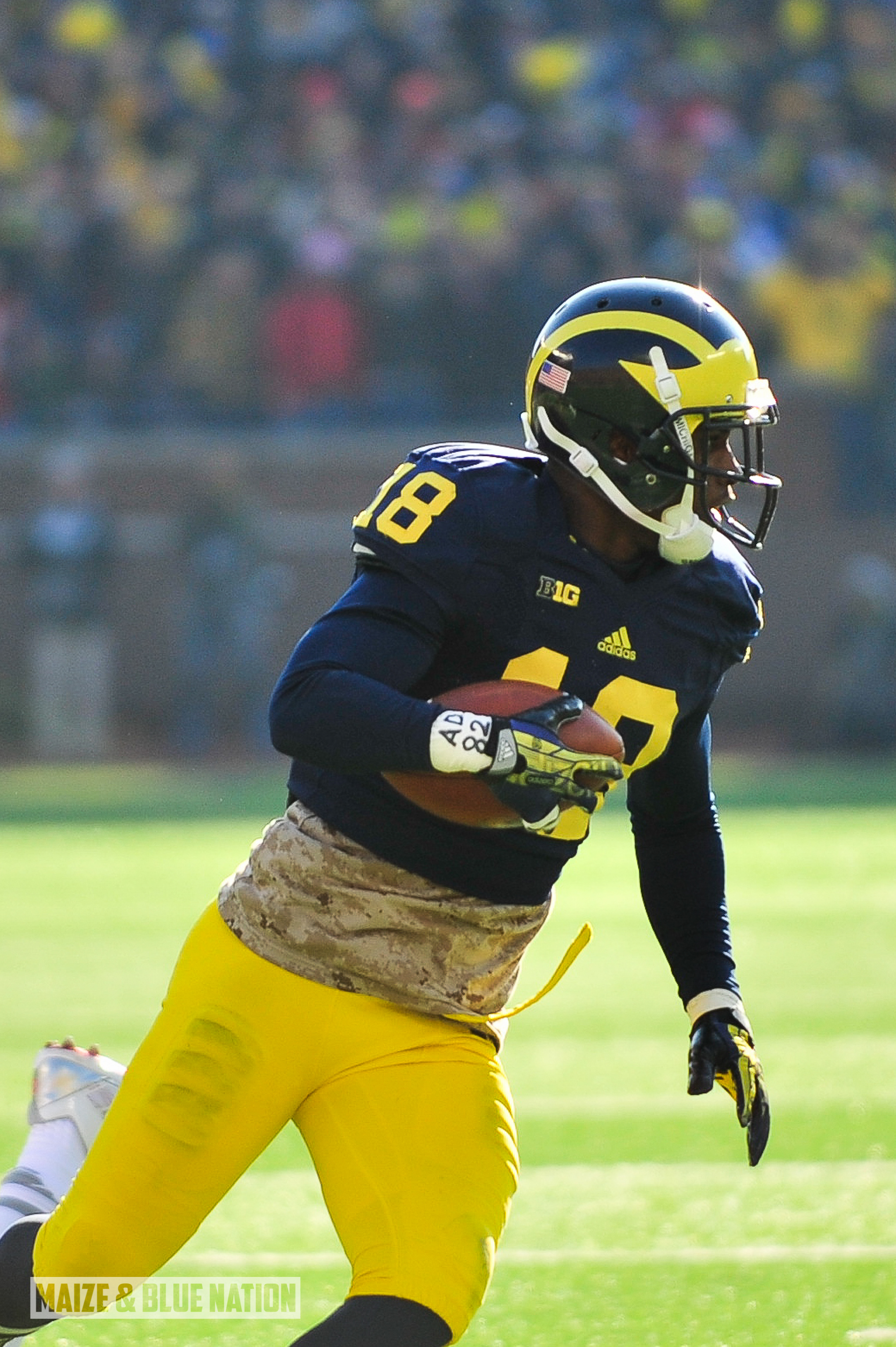
Countess with Michigan in 2013

After a highly successful high school football career at Our Lady of Good Counsel High School, Countess accepted a football scholarship from the University of Michigan where he played from 2011 to 2014. After graduating, he would decide to transfer to Auburn University to play out his final year of NCAA eligibility as a redshirt senior.

=== Michigan ===
Countess saw his first substantial playing time for the 2011 Michigan Wolverines football team in the fourth quarter of a 28–7 victory over San Diego State on September 24, 2011. In less than one quarter, Countess accumulated seven tackles and broke up a pass in the endzone from quarterback Ryan Lindley. After the game, Michigan lineman Ryan Van Bergen noted that Countess has "a swagger about him." The following week, Countess again drew praise for forcing a fumble and leading the team in tackles in a 58–0 win over Minnesota. He received the Next Level Player of the Week award from Matt Bracken of The Baltimore Sun. For the season, he earned 2011 Big Ten Conference All-Freshman team recognition from ESPN.com and BTN.com as well as 2011 TSN first-team All-Freshman and College Football News All-Freshman honorable mention honors.

Countess injured his anterior cruciate ligament in the season opener for the 2012 Michigan Wolverines football team against Alabama. He returned as a redshirt sophomore to be a 2013 All-Big Ten first-team selection by the media and second-team selection the coaches. However, the following year as a redshirt junior he only received honorable mention All-Big Ten recognition from the media.

=== Auburn ===
On May 13, 2015, Countess announced his decision to transfer from Michigan. After a brief recruiting process with various different schools, on May 26 he announced he would be a graduate transfer for the 2015 Auburn Tigers football team, and his enrollment was official by May 28. He had also been recruited by Arizona, Oklahoma and Oklahoma State.

== Professional career ==
Pre-draft measurables
Height	Weight	Arm length	Hand span	40-yard dash	10-yard split	20-yard split	20-yard shuttle	Three-cone drill	Vertical jump	Broad jump	Bench press
5 ft 9 3/4 in (1.77 m)	184 lb (83 kg)	28 3/4 in (0.73 m)	8 1/2 in (0.22 m)	4.53 s	1.46 s	2.56 s	4.15 s	6.82 s	36.5 in (0.93 m)	10 ft 1 in (3.07 m)	21 reps
All values from Auburn's Pro Day

=== Philadelphia Eagles (first stint) ===
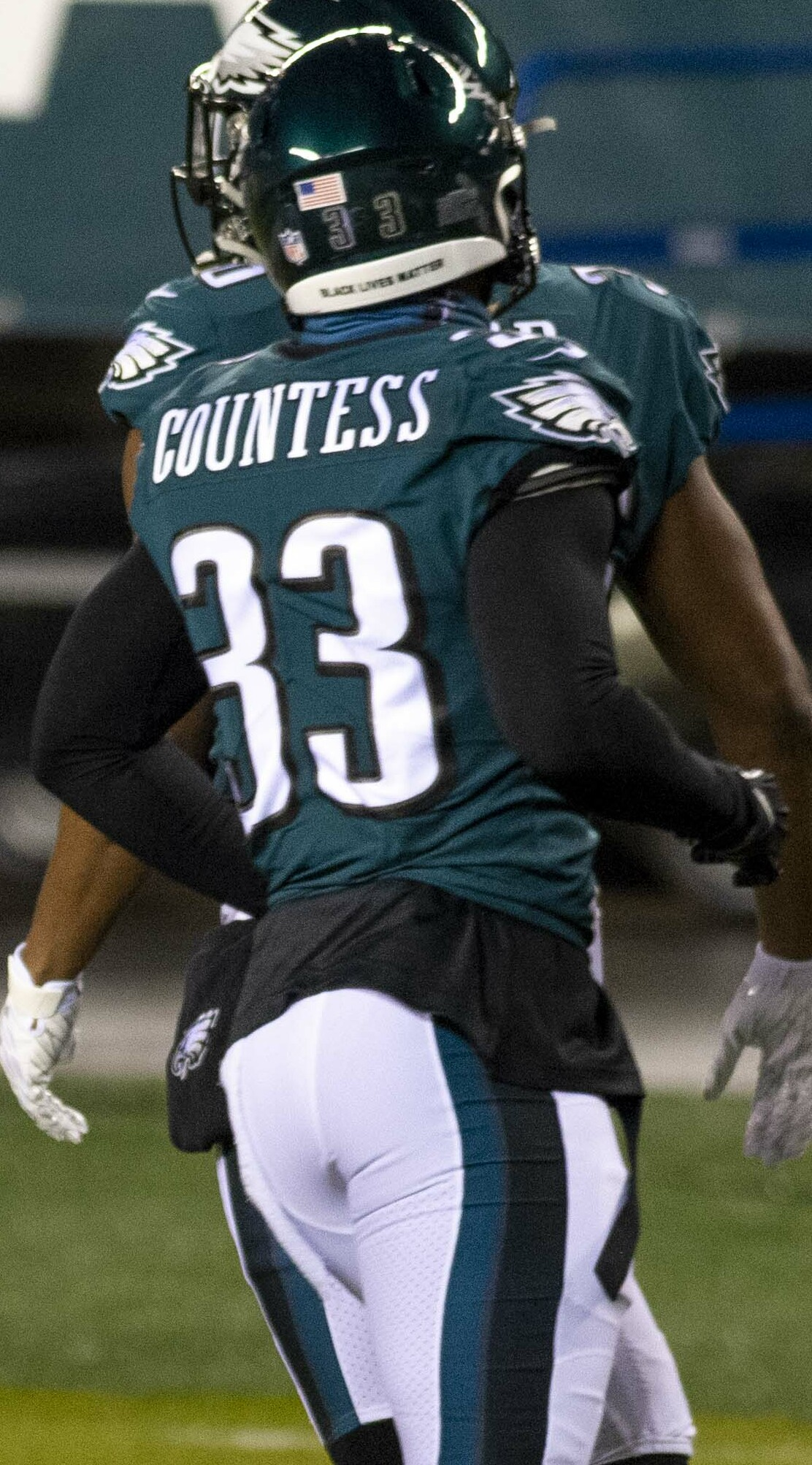
Countess with the Eagles in January 2021

Countess was selected by the Eagles in the sixth round, 196th overall, in the 2016 NFL draft. On September 3, 2016, he was released by the Eagles.

=== Los Angeles Rams (first stint) ===
On September 6, 2016, Countess was signed to the practice squad of the Los Angeles Rams. He was promoted to the Rams' active roster on November 18.

In Week 3 of the 2018 season, Countess returned two kicks for 51 yards and recovered a blocked punt for a touchdown in a 35–23 win over the Los Angeles Chargers, earning him NFC Special Teams Player of the Week.

On March 12, 2019, the Rams tendered Countess as a restricted free agent. On May 2, the Rams waived Countess.

=== Philadelphia Eagles (second stint) ===
On May 3, 2019, Countess was claimed off waivers by the Philadelphia Eagles. He was waived by Philadelphia on August 13.

=== New York Jets ===
On October 15, 2019, Countess was signed by the New York Jets.

On March 11, 2020, Countess was released by the Jets.

=== Philadelphia Eagles (third stint) ===
On December 16, 2020, Countess was signed to the Philadelphia Eagles' practice squad. He was elevated to the active roster on December 19 and January 2, 2021, for the team's Weeks 15 and 17 games against the Arizona Cardinals and Washington Football Team, and reverted to the practice squad after each game. He signed a reserve/future contract with the Eagles on January 4, and was released on March 9.

On August 9, 2021, Countess re-signed with the Eagles. He was placed on injured reserve on August 31. Countess was released by the Eagles on September 9.

=== Baltimore Ravens ===
On December 1, 2021, Countess was signed to the Baltimore Ravens' practice squad. He was released on December 28.

=== Los Angeles Rams (second stint) ===
Countess signed to the Los Angeles Rams' practice squad on January 12, 2022. Countess was elevated to the active roster and won Super Bowl LVI when the Rams defeated the Cincinnati Bengals.

=== New Jersey Generals ===
On January 26, 2023, Countess signed with the New Jersey Generals of the United States Football League (USFL). He was placed on the team's injured reserve list on April 19. Countess was placed on the retired list on October 4.

== NFL career statistics ==
Year	Team	Games		Tackles				Interceptions						Fumbles	
Year	Team	GP	GS	Comb	Total	Ast	Sck	PD	Int	Yds	Avg	Lng	TDs	FF	FR
2016	LAR	5	5	20	20	8	1.0	0	0	0	0.0	0	0	0	0
2017	LAR	16	1	25	23	6	0.0	1	1	19	19	19	0	0	0
2018	LAR	16	1	9	7	2	0.0	2	1	0	0.0	0	0	0	0
2019	NYJ	6	0	0	0	0	0.0	0	0	0	0.0	0	0	0	0
2020	PHI	2	0	3	3	0	0.0	0	0	0	0.0	0	0	0	0
2021	BAL	-	-	-	-	-	-	-	-	-	-	-	-	-	-
Career		45	37	56	53	16	1.0	3	2	19	9.5	19	0	0	0
Source: NFL.com
