= 2015 Birmingham Bowl (December) =

Auburn Tigers	Memphis Tigers
(6−6)	(9−3)
SEC	The American
31	10
Head coach: Gus Malzahn	Head coach: Darrell Dickey (interim)
	1	2	3	4	Total
Auburn	10	0	7	14	31
Memphis	0	10	0	0	10
- Date: December 30, 2015
- Season: 2015
- Stadium: Legion Field
- Location: Birmingham, Alabama
- MVP: Auburn RB Jovon Robinson
- Favorite: Auburn by 2
- Referee: Jeff Heaser (ACC)
- Attendance: 59,430
- Payout: US$1,100,000 (Auburn) $900,000 (Memphis)

United States TV coverage
- Network: ESPN/ESPN Radio
- Announcers: Beth Mowins (play-by-play), Anthony Becht (analyst), Paul Carcaterra (sideline reporter) (ESPN); Allen Bestwick, Dan Hawkins, & Tiffany Greene (ESPN Radio)

The 2015 Birmingham Bowl was a college football bowl game played on December 30, 2015 at Legion Field in Birmingham, Alabama in the United States. The tenth annual Birmingham Bowl featured a team from the Southeastern Conference against a team from the American Athletic Conference. The game was played at 11:00 a.m. CST and aired on ESPN. It was one of the 2015–16 bowl games that concluded the 2015 FBS football season.

== Teams ==
The two Tigers teams were selected from the American Athletic Conference and the SEC conference.

== Game summary ==
Scoring summary

Quarter	Time	Drive			Team	Scoring information	Score	
Quarter	Time	Plays	Yards	TOP	Team	Scoring information	AU	MEM
1	8:35	12	72	6:25	AU	20-yard field goal by Daniel Carlson	3	0
1	1:58	10	70	4:24	AU	Kerryon Johnson 8-yard touchdown run, Daniel Carlson kick good	10	0
2	10:03	7	30	2:56	MEM	53-yard field goal by Jake Elliott	10	3
2	3:06	–	–	–	MEM	Interception returned 56 yards for touchdown by Reggis Ball, Jake Elliott kick good	10	10
3	3:12	8	44	3:35	AU	Jason Smith 11-yard touchdown reception from Jeremy Johnson, Daniel Carlson kick good	17	10
4	14:57	9	76	2:36	AU	Jeremy Johnson 5-yard touchdown run, Daniel Carlson kick good	24	10
4	12:57	2	6	0:57	AU	Jovon Robinson 4-yard touchdown run, Daniel Carlson kick good	31	10
"TOP" = time of possession. For other American football terms, see Glossary of American football.							31	10

=== Statistics ===
Statistics	AUB	MEM
First downs	23	13
Total offense, plays – yards	73–405	68–206
Rushes-yards (net)	56–254	30–102
Passing yards (net)	151	104
Passes, Comp-Att-Int	10–17–3	17–38–1
Time of Possession	34:17	25:43

== Notes ==
- Ticket pricing is $50 for East and West reserved sideline seating and $30 for general admission corner seats.
