= Duke Williams (wide receiver) =

American gridiron football player (born 1993)

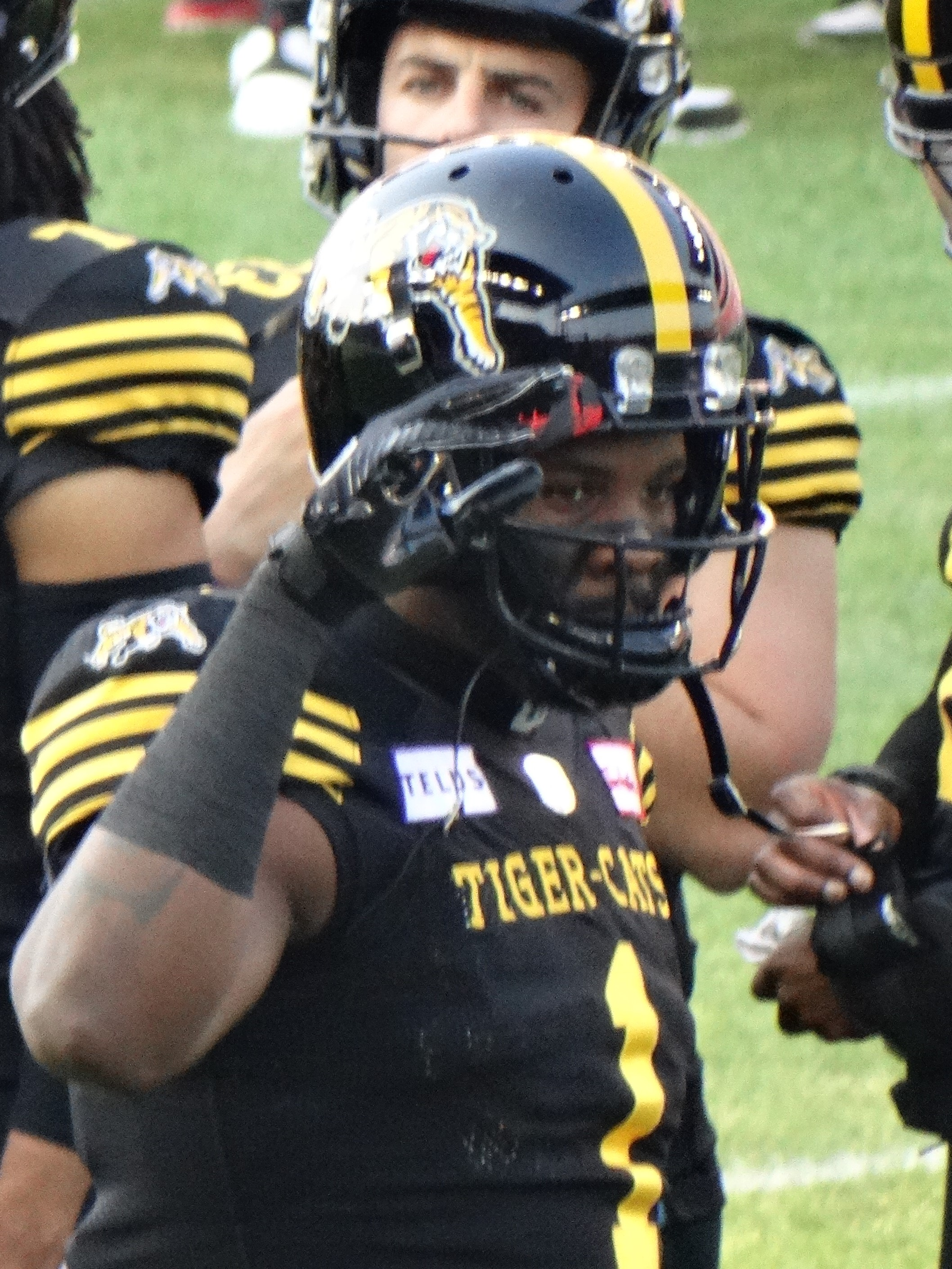
- Williams with the Hamilton Tiger-Cats in 2023

Profile
- Position: Wide receiver

Personal information
- Born: May 13, 1993 (age 33); Los Angeles, California, U.S.
- Listed height: 6 ft 3 in (1.91 m)
- Listed weight: 225 lb (102 kg)

Career information
- High school: Reserve (LA) East St. John
- College: Auburn
- NFL draft: 2016: undrafted

Career history
- Los Angeles Rams (2016)*; Edmonton Eskimos (2017–2018); Buffalo Bills (2019–2021); Saskatchewan Roughriders (2021–2022); Hamilton Tiger-Cats (2023)
- * Offseason or practice squad member only

Awards and highlights
- CFL All-Star – 2018; CFL West All-Star – 2018

Career NFL statistics
- Receptions: 12
- Receiving yards: 166
- Receiving touchdowns: 1
- Stats at Pro Football Reference

Career CFL statistics
- Receptions: 180
- Receiving yards: 3,059
- Receiving touchdowns: 20
- Stats at CFL.ca

D'haquille "Duke" Williams (born May 13, 1993) is an American professional football wide receiver. He played college football at Auburn and signed with the Los Angeles Rams as an undrafted free agent in 2016. Williams made his professional debut in 2017 with the Edmonton Eskimos and became one of the CFL's most dominant receiving threats, leading the league in receiving in 2018. Following his second season in the CFL, Williams returned to the United States for another shot at playing in the National Football League. He signed with the Buffalo Bills in 2019.

== Early life ==
Williams attended East St. John High School in Reserve, Louisiana, where he played high school football. As a senior, Williams had 1,495 receiving yards and 25 touchdowns.

== College career ==
Williams attended Mississippi Gulf Coast Community College from 2012 to 2013. In two years, he had 118 receptions for 2,028 yards and 26 touchdowns.

Considered a five-star recruit by Rivals.com, Williams was listed as the No. 1 junior college prospect in 2014. He initially committed to Louisiana State University but changed to Auburn University.

In his first game at Auburn, Williams had nine receptions for 154 yards and a touchdown. He was dismissed from Auburn on October 6, 2015, for an unidentified violation of team rules. William finished the 2015 season with 12 catches for 147 yards and one touchdown.

== Professional career ==
Pre-draft measurables
Height	Weight	Arm length	Hand span	40-yard dash	10-yard split	20-yard split	20-yard shuttle	Three-cone drill	Vertical jump	Broad jump	Bench press
6 ft 2 1/4 in (1.89 m)	229 lb (104 kg)	32 1/2 in (0.83 m)	9 1/4 in (0.23 m)	4.71 s	1.65 s	2.72 s	4.47 s	7.43 s	30.5 in (0.77 m)	10 ft 1 in (3.07 m)	14 reps
All values from NFL Combine/Pro Day

=== Los Angeles Rams ===
On May 10, 2016, Williams signed a 3-year deal with the Los Angeles Rams as an undrafted free agent. On September 3, 2016, he was waived by the Rams as part of final roster cuts.

=== Edmonton Eskimos ===
Williams signed with the Edmonton Eskimos of the Canadian Football League (CFL) before the 2017 season. Williams caught four passes for 110 yards and a touchdown against the BC Lions in his professional regular season debut. Williams went on to have a strong first season in the CFL, catching 46 passes for 508 yards with two touchdowns. Williams became a star player in the CFL in 2018, earning a Top Performers of the Month designation for the months of June and July and ultimately finished the season with the most receiving yards in the league with 1,579. On January 5, 2019, Williams was released by the Edmonton Eskimos in order to pursue NFL opportunities.

=== Buffalo Bills ===
On January 7, 2019, Williams signed with the Buffalo Bills of the NFL. Williams played in all four preseason games for the Bills, catching eight passes for 78 yards with two touchdowns. He was released during final roster cuts on August 31, but was signed to the practice squad the next day. On October 5, Williams was promoted to the active roster. The next day, he caught four passes for 29 yards and the game winning touchdown in a 14–7 road victory over the Tennessee Titans. After suffering a shoulder injury against the Miami Dolphins in Week 7, Williams was deactivated for the rest of the season until Week 17 when the Bills rested numerous starters against the New York Jets, having already clinched a playoff berth. Williams caught six passes for 108 yards during the 13–6 loss.

Williams was placed on the reserve/COVID-19 list by the Bills on July 29, 2020. He was activated 10 days later. Williams was waived as part of final roster cuts on September 5, but was re-signed to the practice squad the next day. He was elevated to the active roster on October 24 and January 8, 2021, for the team's Week 7 and Wild Card Round games against the New York Jets and Indianapolis Colts, and was reverted to the practice squad after each game.

On January 26, 2021, Williams signed a reserves/futures contract with the Bills. He was waived/injured on August 23 and was placed on injured reserve. Three days later, Williams was released from injured reserve with an injury settlement.

=== Saskatchewan Roughriders ===
On October 4, 2021, Williams signed with the Saskatchewan Roughriders.

On February 5, 2022, Williams signed a one-year, $260,000 contract extension. On July 20, the CFL announced that Williams had been suspended for one game after he took the helmet off of Toronto Argonauts defensive back Shaquille Richardson and threw it at him during warmups for the leagues Touchdown Atlantic game. Williams became a free agent upon the expiry of his contract on February 14, 2023.

=== Hamilton Tiger-Cats ===
On February 14, 2023, Williams signed with the Hamilton Tiger-Cats.
