= Avery Young =

American gridiron football player (born 1992)

Profile
- Position: Offensive tackle

Personal information
- Born: November 12, 1992 (age 33); Palm Beach Gardens, Florida, U.S.
- Listed height: 6 ft 5 in (1.96 m)
- Listed weight: 305 lb (138 kg)

Career information
- High school: Palm Beach Gardens (FL)
- College: Auburn
- NFL draft: 2016: undrafted

Career history
- New Orleans Saints (2016); Miami Dolphins (2017)*; Tampa Bay Buccaneers (2017–2018)*; Seattle Seahawks (2018)*; Birmingham Iron (2019); Hamilton Tiger-Cats (2019)*; St. Louis BattleHawks (2020)*; New York Guardians (2020); Conquerors (2020–2021)*; Vegas Vipers (2023)*
- * Offseason or practice squad member only
- Stats at Pro Football Reference

Avery Young (born November 12, 1992) is an American professional football offensive tackle. He played college football at Auburn, and was signed by the New Orleans Saints as an undrafted free agent in 2016. He is also the younger brother of former defensive end Willie Young.

== College career ==
At Auburn University, Young was a three-year starter at both tackle and guard and served as the starting right tackle during his senior year.

== Professional career ==
Pre-draft measurables
Height	Weight	Arm length	Hand span	Wingspan	40-yard dash	10-yard split	20-yard split	20-yard shuttle	Three-cone drill	Vertical jump	Broad jump	Bench press
6 ft 4 5/8 in (1.95 m)	328 lb (149 kg)	33 3/4 in (0.86 m)	10 1/2 in (0.27 m)	7 ft 0 3/4 in (2.15 m)	5.39 s	1.89 s	2.95 s	4.90 s	8.22 s	25.0 in (0.64 m)	8 ft 1 in (2.46 m)	20 reps
All values from NFL Combine/Pro Day

=== New Orleans Saints ===
Young signed with the New Orleans Saints as an undrafted free agent on May 2, 2016. He suffered a knee injury at his Pro Day and spent his entire rookie season on the Saints' non-football injury list. On February 27, 2017, Young was released by the Saints.

=== Miami Dolphins ===
On March 21, 2017, Young signed with the Miami Dolphins. He was waived on September 2, 2017.

=== Tampa Bay Buccaneers ===
On December 20, 2017, Young was signed to the Tampa Bay Buccaneers' practice squad. He signed a reserve/future contract with the Buccaneers on January 3, 2018. He was waived on April 30, 2018.

=== Seattle Seahawks ===
On May 7, 2018, Young signed with the Seattle Seahawks. He was waived/injured on August 1, 2018 and placed on injured reserve. He was released on August 14, 2018.

=== Birmingham Iron ===
In 2019, Young joined the Birmingham Iron of the Alliance of American Football.

=== Hamilton Tiger-Cats ===
After the AAF ceased operations in April 2019, Young signed with the Hamilton Tiger-Cats of the Canadian Football League.

=== St. Louis BattleHawks ===
In October 2019, Young was picked by the St. Louis BattleHawks in the open phase of the 2020 XFL draft.

=== New York Guardians ===
On January 17, 2020, Young was traded to the New York Guardians, along with offensive lineman Dejon Allen, in exchange for cornerback David Rivers and offensive lineman Brian Wallace. He had his contract terminated when the league suspended operations on April 10, 2020.

=== The Spring League ===
Young was selected by the Conquerors of The Spring League during its player selection draft on October 11, 2020. His contract was terminated when the league suspended operations in 2021.

=== Vegas Vipers ===
Young was selected by the Vegas Vipers in the 2023 XFL draft.
