= Peyton Barber =

American football player (born 1994)

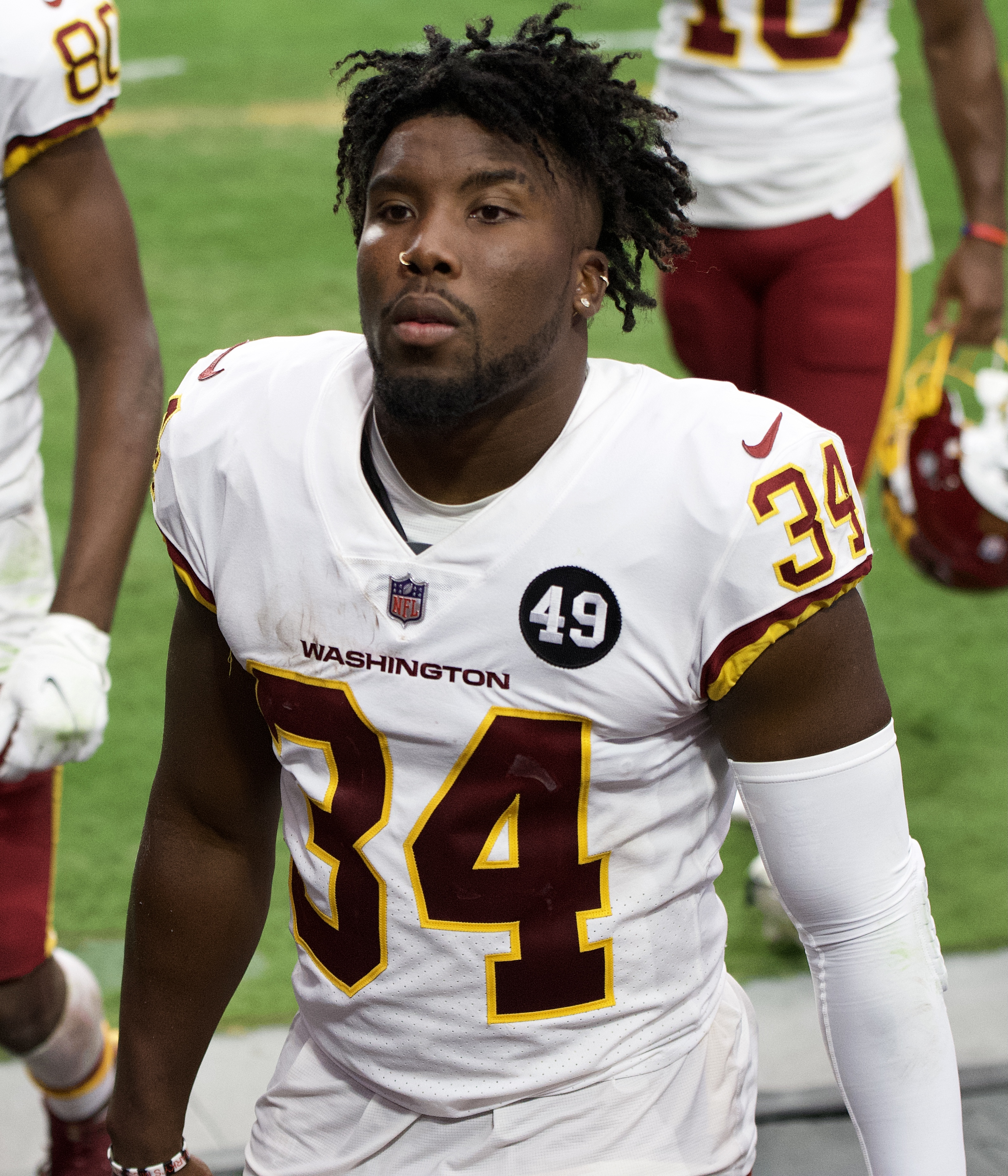
- Barber with the Washington Football Team in 2020

Profile
- Position: Running back

Personal information
- Born: June 27, 1994 (age 32); Roswell, Georgia, U.S.
- Listed height: 5 ft 11 in (1.80 m)
- Listed weight: 225 lb (102 kg)

Career information
- High school: Milton (Milton, Georgia)
- College: Auburn (2013–2015)
- NFL draft: 2016: undrafted

Career history
- Tampa Bay Buccaneers (2016–2019); Washington Football Team (2020); Las Vegas Raiders (2021); BC Lions (2026)*
- * Offseason or practice squad member only

Career NFL statistics
- Rushing yards: 2,457
- Rushing average: 3.5
- Rushing touchdowns: 21
- Receptions: 71
- Receiving yards: 428
- Receiving touchdowns: 2
- Stats at Pro Football Reference

Kenneth Peyton Barber (born June 27, 1994) is an American professional football running back. He played college football for the Auburn Tigers. Barber began his pro career in the National Football League (NFL), signing with the Tampa Bay Buccaneers as an undrafted free agent in 2016. He has also played for the Washington Football Team and Las Vegas Raiders.

== Early life ==
Barber attended Milton High School in Milton, Georgia. As a senior, he rushed for 1,700 yards and had 22 touchdowns for the Eagles. He was rated as a three-star recruit by Rivals.com. Barber originally committed to the University of Mississippi to play college football before signing with Auburn University.

== College career ==
Barber attended Auburn University from 2013 to 2015. After redshirting his first year with the Tigers, he appeared in six games in 2014. He had 10 carries for 54 yards. Barber became Auburn's starter during his sophomore year in 2015. In the first game of the season he rushed for 115 yards on 24 carries.

Barber finished the season with 1,017 yards and 13 touchdowns. He finished with 1,071 yards and 13 touchdowns in his Auburn career. On January 18, 2016, Barber decided to forgo his redshirt junior season for the 2016 NFL draft. He declared for the 2016 NFL Draft with two years of eligibility remaining.

== Professional career ==
Pre-draft measurables
Height	Weight	Arm length	Hand span	Wingspan	40-yard dash	10-yard split	20-yard split	20-yard shuttle	Three-cone drill	Vertical jump	Broad jump	Bench press
5 ft 10 in (1.78 m)	228 lb (103 kg)	30 1/4 in (0.77 m)	9 3/8 in (0.24 m)	6 ft 1 7/8 in (1.88 m)	4.60 s	1.59 s	2.68 s	4.21 s	7.00 s	32.5 in (0.83 m)	9 ft 3 in (2.82 m)	20 reps
All values from NFL Combine/Pro Day

=== Tampa Bay Buccaneers ===
==== 2016 season ====
After going undrafted in the 2016 NFL Draft, Barber signed with the Tampa Bay Buccaneers on May 2, 2016.

On September 3, 2016, Barber was released by the Buccaneers as part of final roster cuts. The next day, he was signed to the Buccaneers' practice squad. On September 8, he was promoted to the Buccaneers' active roster. In the 2016 season opener, he made his NFL debut but recorded no official statistics against the Atlanta Falcons. On October 10, against the Carolina Panthers, he had his first three career carries, which went for six total yards. In the next game, against the San Francisco 49ers, he had a solid performance with 12 carries for 84 yards and a touchdown. Overall, he finished his rookie season with 223 rushing yards and one rushing touchdown to go along with five receptions for 28 yards.

==== 2017 season ====
The Buccaneers struggled in 2017 and Barber did not see much playing time until the latter part of the season. In Week 12, against the Falcons, he was held to seven yards on five carries but scored two rushing touchdowns. In Week 13, against the Green Bay Packers, he had 23 carries for 102 yards to go along with four receptions for 41 yards in the 26–20 loss. In the regular season finale, against the New Orleans Saints, he had 71 rushing yards and a rushing touchdown in the 31–24 victory. Overall, he finished the 2017 season with 423 rushing yards, three rushing touchdowns, and 16 receptions for 114 yards.

==== 2018 season ====
Barber experienced an increase in usage in the backfield in 2018. In Week 6, against the Falcons, he had 82 rushing yards to go along with four receptions for 24 receiving yards and a receiving touchdown. Two weeks later, he had his first rushing touchdown of the season to go along with 85 rushing yards against the Cincinnati Bengals. In Week 11 against the New York Giants, he had 18 carries for 106 rushing yards and a rushing touchdown in a 38–35 loss. Overall, he finished the 2018 season with 871 rushing yards and five rushing touchdowns to go along with 20 receptions for 92 receiving yards and a receiving touchdown.

==== 2019 season ====
On March 13, 2019, Barber re-signed with the Buccaneers. In Week 2 against the Panthers, Barber rushed 23 times for 82 yards and a touchdown as the Buccaneers won 20–14. In Week 10, during a 30–27 win over the Arizona Cardinals, Barber rushed 11 times for 43 yards and the game clinching touchdown. In Week 13, during a 28–11 win over the Jacksonville Jaguars, Barber rushed 17 times for 44 yards, two touchdowns, and a two-point conversion. Overall, Barber finished the 2019 season with 470 rushing yards and six rushing touchdown to go along with 16 receptions for 115 receiving yards and one receiving touchdown.

=== Washington Football Team ===
On March 26, 2020, Barber signed a two-year, $3 million contract with the Washington Football Team. He scored two rushing touchdowns in a Week 1 victory over the Philadelphia Eagles. In the 2020 season, Barber finished with 94 carries for 258 rushing yards and four rushing touchdowns.

Barber was released on August 31, 2021, but re-signed to the practice squad the following day.

=== Las Vegas Raiders ===
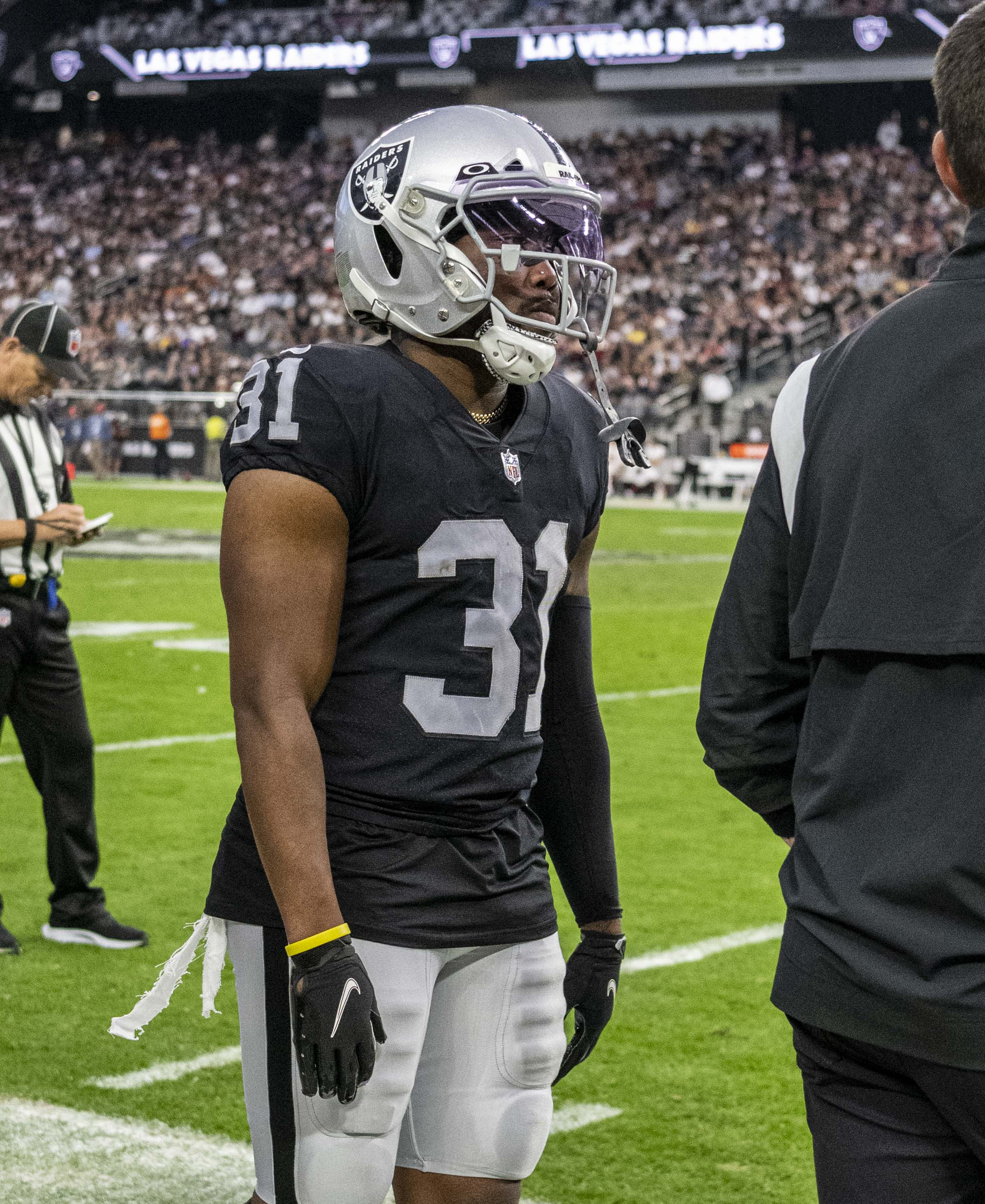
Barber playing for the Raiders in 2021.

Barber signed with the Las Vegas Raiders off Washington's practice squad on September 4, 2021. Barber's contract expired in March 2022.

=== BC Lions ===
On December 17, 2025, and after having not played in a professional football game in over five years and having been a free agent for three, Barber resumed his career by signing with the BC Lions of the Canadian Football League (CFL). On May 18, 2026, Barber was released by the Lions.

== Career statistics ==
=== NFL ===
Year	Team	Games		Rushing					Receiving					Fumbles	
Year	Team	GP	GS	Att	Yds	Avg	Lng	TD	Rec	Yds	Avg	Lng	TD	Fum	Lost
2016	TB	15	1	55	223	4.1	44T	1	5	28	5.6	11	0	0	0
2017	TB	16	4	108	423	3.9	34	3	16	114	7.1	34	0	2	1
2018	TB	16	16	234	891	3.7	28	5	20	92	4.6	21	1	1	1
2019	TB	16	7	154	470	3.1	17	6	16	115	7.2	16	1	1	1
2020	WAS	16	2	94	258	2.7	15	4	4	12	3.0	7	0	0	0
2021	LV	10	1	55	212	3.9	27	2	10	67	6.7	23	0	2	0
Career		89	31	700	2,457	3.5	44	21	71	428	6.0	34	2	6	3

=== College ===
Year	Team	GP	Rushing				Receiving			
Year	Team	GP	Att	Yds	Avg	TD	Rec	Yds	Avg	TD
2014	Auburn	5	10	54	5.4	0	0	0	0.0	0
2015	Auburn	13	238	1,017	4.3	13	11	112	10.2	0
Career		18	248	1,071	4.3	13	11	112	10.2	0

== Personal life ==
Barber was diagnosed with attention deficit hyperactivity disorder (ADHD) when he was in middle school and with dyslexia in 2014.

Barber appeared on HBO's Vice premiering on March 31, 2017. The episode titled "End Of Amateurism" was about recent lawsuit claims against the NCAA. The episode chronicled him opting for the NFL draft rather than finishing his education due to financial reasons. He is the cousin of running back Jeremy Langford.
