= 2021 The Spring League season =

American football league

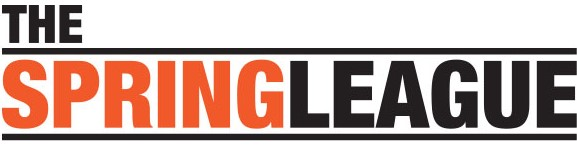
- League: The Spring League
- Sport: American football
- Duration: Regular season: May 6 – June 12; Final: June 19
- Games: 6 per team
- Teams: 8
- TV partner(s): Fox, FS1, FS2
- Season MVP: Ryan Willis
- North champions: Linemen
- North runners-up: Conquerors
- South champions: Jousters
- South runners-up: Generals
- Finals champions: Linemen
- Runners-up: Jousters
- Finals MVP: Ryan Willis

Seasons
- ← Fall 2020 2025 Pro Showcase →

The 2021 The Spring League season was the sixth and final season of The Spring League. This was the only season to feature eight teams in two divisions: the North Division in Indianapolis, Indiana and the South Division in Houston, Texas.

The Linemen beat the Jousters 26–23 in the first and only Mega Bowl, and won the TSL championship. Linemen QB Ryan Willis won both final and regular season MVP awards.

== Format and rules ==
The 2021 season kicked off on Thursday, May 6 and was divided to two divisions that played in hub cities: The North Division in Indianapolis and the South Division in Houston. Each division champion advanced to the 2021 TSL Championship game that took place on June 19.

The 2021 season featured new rules that aimed to improve the game, specifically introducing a new overtime format, the "spot and choose" rule, which means that the team that wins the overtime coin toss was to pick the spot of the ball, while the other team would choose whether to play offense or defense. A similar rule was proposed by the Baltimore Ravens after the 2020 NFL season.

== Players ==
The player participation fee for the 2021 season was $2,000, with exception for players who had been in an NFL training camp within the past three years, who were not required to pay. According to league CEO Brian Woods, the preference was for TSL coaches, players and staff to be vaccinated for COVID-19 before the season begins. If not, they were asked for proof of a negative test upon arrival and were subject to daily testing thereafter.

Every team started the season with 35 to 41 players roster, and were allowed to make changes throughout the season.

=== Tryouts ===
In March 2021, TSL announced that they reached a partnership agreement with Stephen Austin's American National Combines, and were holding tryouts for the first time in league history. They also declared that players who were on an active roster during TSL's fall 2020 season were not required to participate in the tryouts.

=== Notable players ===
On April 16, the first player for the 2021 TSL season was announced, as former Syracuse and Dallas Renegades QB Eric Dungey confirmed he will play for the Blues, although he was later accepted tryout invite to Cincinnati Bengals rookie minicamp, and was later signed to their 90-men roster. On a later date the league revealed the other Quarterbacks who would play, including seven-year NFL veteran Ryan Mallett (Generals), former XFL players Luis Perez (Jousters), Brandon Silvers (Conquerors), and Nick Fitzgerald (Sea Lions), and three former P5 colleges QB's Brian Lewerke (Alphas), Keller Chryst (Aviators), and Ryan Willis (Linemen).

On May 12, after the first week was concluded, TSL announced that former Super Bowl champion Brandon Marshall was joining the Generals after strong showing at HUB Football camp, but before the Generals game on week 2 it was revealed that Marshall decided to pursue NFL opportunities instead of joining the league.

39 players with XFL experience were on TSL rosters, and 19 players who participated in the Fan Controlled Football 2021 season (Joseph Putu, Roman Tatum, David Gilbert, Kwadarrius Smith, Curtis Collins, Dominique Martin, Jaylen Flye-Sadler, EJ price, JaMichael Edwards Lott, Deondre Francois, Lawerence Keys, Dwayne Wallace, Donald Boone, LaDarius Galloway, Andrew Jamiel, KaVontae Turpin, Saige Young, Cecil Cherry and Antonio Dawkins).

The league also featured three international players: Kicker Tadhg Leader (Aviators) from the Republic of Ireland, Defensive Linemen Orlovicius Laurynas (Blues) from Lithuania and Wide receiver James Tyrrell from Canada.

==== Other noteworthy players ====
Alphas: Vad Lee, Brian Lewerke, Jawill Davis, Kristjan Sokoli, Christian DiLauro, Gabe Holmes, Azeem Victor and Mazzi Wilkins, while Brady White joined before week 4.

Aviators: Keller Chryst, Romar Morris, Malcolm Pridgeon, Lavon Hooks, Mark McLaurin and Irish-born American rugby union player Tadhg Leader, while Vad Lee joined from the "Alphas" before week 5.

Blues: Eric Dungey, Deondre Francois, Fabian Guerra, Davion Davis, Hakeem Valles, David Grinnage, Denzel Rice and Xavier Perston.

Conquerors: Brandon Silvers, Kevin Anderson, Cameron Jefferson, Anthony Morris, Robenson Therezie, Matt Seybert, Prince Charles Iworah and Vinny Papale (son of Vince Papale), while Ahmad Gooden joined before week 2.

Generals: Ryan Mallett, Case Cookus, Devin Gray, Jordan Suell, Sal Cannella, Ethan Westbrooks, Blair Brown, Carroll Phillips, Kamilo Tongamoa, Nevelle Clarke, Malik Gant and Lirim Hajrullahu.

Jousters: Luis Perez, Drew Anderson, Lavon Coleman, De'Lance Turner, De'Quan Hampton, Damore'ea Stringfellow, Donnie Ernsberger, Tejan Koroma, Damien Mama, Bunmi Rotimi, Tomasi Laulile, Christian Sam, Nyles Morgan, Derrick Jones, A. J. Hendy, Shalom Luani, Joshua Simmons, William Likely, Ricky Aguayo, Manoa Pikula and Colton Schmidt.

Linemen: Ryan Willis, Reece Horn, Frederick Mauigoa, Elijah Qualls and Jordan Wyatt, while Damon Sheehy-Guiseppi joined before week 6.

Sea Lions: Nick Fitzgerald, Matt Jones (released after week 1), Adam Choice, Kendrick Rogers, Nick Buchanan, Shaneil Jenkins, Levonta Taylor, John Baron II and DeAndre Johnson from Last Chance U' second season, while Jordan Mills and Robert Myers joined before week 2, and Garrett Hartley joined before week 4.

== Coaches ==
For the 2021 spring season TSL featured a mix of returning coaches from previous seasons and former college football college or minor leagues HC's. Terry Shea (Aviators), Ted Cottrell (Blues), Jerry Glanville (Conquerors) and defending champion Bart Andrus (Generals) returned to their 2020 Fall season teams, while Peter Vaas (Alphas) and Kevin Gilbride (Jousters) replaced Steve Fairchild and Chuck Bresnahan (respectively). Hal Mumme was appointed as the "Linemen" head coach, while Mike Riley was first announced as the "Sea Lions" coach, but it was later changed to Larry Kirksey. Shea is the only one that coached in every TSL season.

Some of the more recognizable assistants were Paul Spicer (DC, Sea Lions), A. J. Smith (OC, Conquerors), Derrius Bell (DC, Blues), Jay Hayes (DC, Jousters), Jeff Reinebold (DC/STC, Generals), Dale Carlson (WR, Linemen), Blake Brockermeyer (OL, Sea Lions) and Johnnie Mack (RB, Blues), while QB Stan Bedwell was a player-coach for the Linemen.

== Teams ==
The 2021 season featured two new teams: The Linemen and Sea Lions, which were added to the six returning teams from the 2020 fall season.

Division	Team	Colors	First year	Roster	City	Stadium	Capacity	Head coach
North	Alphas		2020		Indianapolis, Indiana	Lucas Oil Stadium*	67,000	Peter Vaas
North	Aviators		2020		Indianapolis, Indiana	Lucas Oil Stadium*	67,000	Terry Shea
North	Conquerors		2020		Indianapolis, Indiana	Lucas Oil Stadium*	67,000	Jerry Glanville
North	Linemen		2021		Indianapolis, Indiana	Lucas Oil Stadium*	67,000	Hal Mumme
South	Blues		2020		Houston, Texas	Rice Stadium	47,000	Ted Cottrell
South	Generals		2019		Houston, Texas	Rice Stadium	47,000	Bart Andrus
South	Jousters		2020		Houston, Texas	Rice Stadium	47,000	Kevin Gilbride
South	Sea Lions		2021		Houston, Texas	Rice Stadium	47,000	Larry Kirksey

^{*} Week 6 games were played at the Bud and Jackie Sellick Bowl.

== Season schedule ==
The games were played mostly on Thursdays, Fridays and Saturdays, with one game being played on Monday and one on Tuesday due to weather implications. For the first time, one game every week was broadcast on FOX (including the championship game). All other games were broadcast on FS1, with the exception of two games being shown on FS2.

Week	Date	Time (EST)	Team 1	Score	Team 2	Score	Site	Notes	TV	Viewership (millions)	Refs	Stats	Transactions
Week 1	May 6	7:00 PM	Alphas	23	Aviators	9	Lucas Oil Stadium		FS1	0.095			
Week 1	May 6	10:00 PM	Conquerors	27	Linemen	20	Lucas Oil Stadium		FS1	0.051			
Week 1	May 7	9:30 PM	Sea Lions	12	Blues	15	Rice Stadium		FS1	0.114			
Week 1	May 8	3:00 PM	Jousters	19	Generals	21	Rice Stadium		Fox	0.38			
Week 2	May 15	3:00 PM	Conquerors	21	Alphas	26	Lucas Oil Stadium		Fox	0.448			
Week 2	May 15	7:00 PM	Linemen	17	Aviators	3	Lucas Oil Stadium		FS2				
Week 2	May 17	9:00 PM	Sea Lions	17	Generals	13	Rice Stadium	Originally scheduled for May 17 at 7:00 PM	FS1	0.106			
Week 2	May 18	8:00 PM	Blues	7	Jousters	28	Rice Stadium	Originally scheduled for May 17 at 10:00 PM	FS1	0.05			
Week 3	May 20	7:00 PM	Aviators	7	Conquerors	34	Lucas Oil Stadium		FS1	0.059			
Week 3	May 20	10:00 PM	Linemen	47	Alphas	7	Lucas Oil Stadium		FS1	0.04			
Week 3	May 22	3:00 PM	Generals	24	Blues	9	Rice Stadium		Fox	0.408			
Week 3	May 22	7:00 PM	Jousters	22	Sea Lions	7	Rice Stadium		FS1	0.136			
Week 4	May 27	7:00 PM	Linemen	46 (OT)	Conquerors	39	Lucas Oil Stadium		FS1				
Week 4	May 27	10:00 PM	Aviators	6	Alphas	30	Lucas Oil Stadium		FS1				
Week 4	May 29	3:00 PM	Blues	19	Sea Lions	10	Rice Stadium		Fox	0.365			
Week 4	May 29	9:00 PM	Jousters	22	Generals	11	Rice Stadium		FS1				
Week 5	June 3	7:00 PM	Alphas	10	Conquerors	27	Lucas Oil Stadium		FS1	0.075			
Week 5	June 4	8:00 PM	Aviators	19	Linemen	20	Lucas Oil Stadium		FS1	0.081			
Week 5	June 5	3:00 PM	Generals	39	Sea Lions	27	Rice Stadium		Fox	0.38			
Week 5	June 5	7:00 PM	Jousters	10	Blues	12	Rice Stadium		FS1	0.079			
Week 6	June 11	7:00 PM	Alphas	22	Linemen	27	Bud and Jackie Sellick Bowl	Originally scheduled at Lucas Oil Stadium	FS1	0.095			
Week 6	June 11	10:00 PM	Conquerors	16 (OT)	Aviators	9	Bud and Jackie Sellick Bowl	Originally scheduled at Lucas Oil Stadium	FS1	0.064			
Week 6	June 12	12:00 PM	Sea Lions	10	Jousters	27	Rice Stadium		Fox	0.461			
Week 6	June 12	8:00 PM	Blues	16	Generals	23	Rice Stadium		FS2				
Championship	June 19	3:00 PM	Linemen	26	Jousters	23	Rice Stadium	Mega Bowl	Fox	0.418			

== Standings ==
Spring League 2021
North Division
Team	W	L	PCT	PF	PA
Linemen	5	1	.833	177	117
Conquerors	4	2	.666	164	118
Alphas	3	3	.500	118	137
Aviators	0	6	.000	55	143
South Division
Team	W	L	PCT	PF	PA
Jousters	4	2	.666	128	68
Generals	4	2	.666	131	110
Blues	3	3	.500	78	107
Sea Lions	1	5	.166	83	135

== Awards ==
=== Players of the week ===
Week	North Division				South Division			
Week	Player	Pos.	Team	Ref.	Player	Pos.	Team	Ref.
1	Blake Morgan	RB	Alphas		Lirim Hajrullahu	K	Generals	
2	Tevon Wright	WR	Alphas		LaDarius Galloway	RB	Sea Lions	
3	Ryan Willis	QB	Linemen		Colton Schmidt	P	Jousters	
4	Michael Dereus	WR	Linemen		Cameron Scarlett	RB	Jousters	
5	Reece Horn	WR	Linemen		Darnell Holland	RB/KR	Generals	
6	Cornelius Sturghill	DB	Alphas		Ryan Mallett	QB	Generals	
Final	Ryan Willis	QB	Linemen		–			

== Statistical leaders ==
Records reflect statistics through regular season games only.

Type	Statistic	Qty	Player	Team
Passing	Yards	1,680 1,139; 685	Ryan Willis Ryan Mallett; Brandon Silvers	Linemen Generals; Conquerors
Passing	Touchdowns	13 9; 7	Ryan Willis Brandon Silvers; Luis Perez	Linemen Conquerors; Jousters
Rushing	Yards	319 295; 267	LaDarius Galloway Blake Morgan; Tra Minter	Sea Lions Alphas; Linemen
Rushing	Touchdowns	4	Tra Minter; Sola Olateju	Linemen; Conquerors
Receiving	Yards	435 424; 346	Michael Dereus Tevon Wright; Reece Horn	Linemen Alphas; Linemen
Receiving	Receptions	37; 37 34	Ben Putman; Michael Bandy Tevon Wright	Linemen; Conquerors Alphas
Receiving	Touchdowns	5 3; 3; 3; 3; 3	Isaac Zico KaVontae Turpin; Ben Putman; Michael Bandy; Reece Horn; Tavonn Salter	Linemen Sea Lions; Linemen; Conquerors; Linemen; Conquerors
Kicking	FGM	12 10; 8	Lirim Hajrullahu Jonathan Song; Nathan Hierlihy	Generals Linemen; Alphas

== Signees to professional leagues ==
The following players signed with NFL or CFL teams following their involvement with The Spring League in 2021:

=== NFL ===
Player	Position	TSL team	NFL team	Ref.
Evin Ksiezarczyk	OL	Generals	Minnesota Vikings	
Case Cookus	QB	Generals	Denver Broncos	
Christian DiLauro	OL	Alphas	Tennessee Titans	
Devin Gray	WR	Generals	Baltimore Ravens	
C. J. Saunders	WR	Aviators	Carolina Panthers	
Tyrone Wheatley Jr.	OL	Blues	Chicago Bears	
Salvatore Cannella*	TE	Generals	Chicago Bears	
Siaosi Mariner	WR	Generals	Baltimore Ravens	
Damon Lloyd	LB	Blues	Los Angeles Chargers	
Willie Yarbary	DL	Conquerors	Los Angeles Chargers	
Matt Seybert	TE	Conquerors	Los Angeles Chargers	
De'Quan Hampton	TE	Jousters	Tampa Bay Buccaneers	
Malcolm Pridgeon	OL	Aviators	Pittsburgh Steelers	
Cole Boozer	OL	Linemen	Washington Football Team	
Chris Okoye	DL	Alphas	Los Angeles Chargers	
Lirim Hajrullahu	K	Generals	Dallas Cowboys	
Brian Lewerke	QB	Alphas	New York Giants	
Dominique Martin	DB	Conquerors	Green Bay Packers	
Ethan Westbrooks	DL	Generals	Las Vegas Raiders	
Elijah Qualls	DL	Linemen	New York Giants	
Malik Gant	DB	Generals	New England Patriots	
Lukayus McNeil	OT	Jousters	Seattle Seahawks	
Anthony Ratliff-Williams	WR	Jousters	Seattle Seahawks	
Donnie Ernsberger	TE	Jousters	Tennessee Titans	
Jeff Cotton	WR	Alphas	Jacksonville Jaguars	
Jon Hilliman*	RB	Jousters	Green Bay Packers	
Case Cookus	QB	Generals	Minnesota Vikings	
Salvatore Cannella	TE	Generals	Miami Dolphins	
Gabe Holmes	TE	Alphas	Miami Dolphins	
Josh Avery	DL	Alphas	Green Bay Packers	
Davion Davis	WR	Blues	Cleveland Browns	
Reece Horn	WR	Linemen	Cincinnati Bengals	
Cameron Scarlett	RB	Jousters	Seattle Seahawks	
Bunmi Rotimi	DE	Jousters	Washington Football Team	
Ryan Willis*	QB	Linemen	Chicago Bears	
Davion Davis	WR	Blues	Houston Texans	

^{*} Workout/ Minicamp invite.

=== CFL ===
Player	Position	TSL team	CFL team	Ref.
Cole Boozer	OL	Linemen	Montreal Alouettes	
David Brown	OL	Alphas	Montreal Alouettes	
Johnathon Johnson	WR	Jousters	BC Lions	
C.J. Worton	WR	Jousters	Winnipeg Blue Bombers	
James Tyrrell	WR	Sea Lions	Winnipeg Blue Bombers	
Reggie Cole	DB	Linemen	Hamilton Tiger-Cats	
Drew Anderson	QB	Jousters	Edmonton Elks	
Stefen Banks	DL	Linemen	Calgary Stampeders	
Nyles Morgan	LB	Jousters	Edmonton Elks	
A. J. Hendy	DB	Jousters	Saskatchewan Roughriders	
Erick Browne	OL	Aviators	Edmonton Elks	
Jordan Suell	WR	Generals	Saskatchewan Roughriders	
Drew Richmond	OL	Linemen	Winnipeg Blue Bombers	
Jordan Murray	OL	Generals	Hamilton Tiger-Cats	
Taylor Tappin	OL	Aviators	Ottawa Redblacks	

== Controversy ==
In November the league was sued for failing to pay $1.4 million in bills during a nine-week stay in Indianapolis, for the use of Lucas Oil Stadium ($235,000 for six games) and hotel stay ($1.1 million for 4,740 room nights). Also, Butler University sued TSL for about $33,000 in unpaid bills, for its use of the Sellick Bowl for practices.

== Aftermath ==
On June 3, 2021, Woods announced that he had acquired the remaining extant trademarks of the United States Football League with intent of launching a USFL-branded league in 2022, with Fox Sports remaining as a partner in the new USFL. What was to become of The Spring League remained, at the time, an unresolved question, but according to the initial announcement TSL was to continue, probably as a scouting showcase or developmental operation. It was later reported that TSL in no longer associated with the new USFL.

On February 18, 2022, Woods stated that TSL was "no longer operational." He would eventually revive the league in 2025 with The Pro Showcase.
