= Romar Morris =

American gridiron football player (born 1992)

No. 21, 32
- Position: Running back

Personal information
- Born: October 21, 1992 (age 34); Salisbury, North Carolina, U.S.
- Listed height: 5 ft 10 in (1.78 m)
- Listed weight: 192 lb (87 kg)

Career information
- High school: Salisbury (NC)
- College: North Carolina
- NFL draft: 2016: undrafted

Career history
- New York Jets (2016); Calgary Stampeders (2018–2019); TSL Aviators (2020–2021)

Career CFL statistics
- Rushing attempts: 90
- Rushing yards: 397
- Rushing touchdowns: 4
- Receptions: 31
- Receiving yards: 225
- Stats at CFL.ca
- Stats at Pro Football Reference

Romar Morris (born October 21, 1992) is an American former professional gridiron football running back. He was signed by the New York Jets as an undrafted free agent at the conclusion of the 2016 NFL draft. Morris was the NCHSAA Male Athlete of the Year(2011) at Salisbury High School in North Carolina. He played professionally for the Calgary Stampeders of the Canadian Football League (CFL) and in The Spring League (TSL) for The Aviators.

== College career ==
He played college football at North Carolina.

== Professional career ==
Pre-draft measurables
Height	Weight	40-yard dash	20-yard shuttle	Three-cone drill	Vertical jump	Broad jump	Bench press
5 ft 9 in (1.75 m)	190 lb (86 kg)	4.36 s	4.31 s	6.87 s	38 in (0.97 m)	9 ft 8 in (2.95 m)	15 reps

Morris was signed by the New York Jets as an undrafted free agent in 2016, but finished the season on Injured Reserve after an injury during practice. Morris completed his Rookie season and was invited to 2017 Jets Training Camp. Morris was released at the conclusion of camp.

He signed with the Calgary Stampeders in May 2018. Morris completed his Rookie season leading the team with 7 Total Touchdowns. Morris also won a Grey Cup with the Stampeders in 2018. In November 2018, he suffered a torn Achilles tendon. In August 2019, Morris again suffered an Achilles tendon injury.

Morris was selected by the Aviators of The Spring League during their player selection draft on October 10, 2020. He remained on the Aviators' roster for the 2021 season.
