= 2017 The Spring League season =

American football league

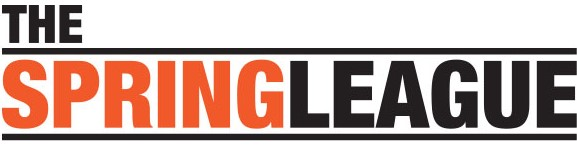
- League: The Spring League
- Sport: American football
- Duration: April 15 – 25
- Games: 2 per team (planned)
- Teams: 4
- TV partner(s): Facebook/ FloSports (Showcase only)
- Season champions: Orange

Seasons
- 2018

The 2017 The Spring League season was the first overall in league history, which was played in Sulphur Springs, West Virginia at The Greenbrier resort.

== Business plan ==
CEO Woods founded The Spring League in early 2016. On December 22, 2016, SiriusXM NFL Radio initially reported the league as being owned by the NFL, but retracted that by the end of the day. The NFL informed its teams of the league's existence and its plans to operate from April 5 through April 26, 2017. The Spring League's 2017 season consisted of a four-team, three-week single round-robin tournament in White Sulphur Springs, West Virginia at The Greenbrier resort in April, and a two-team "Showcase" game in Napa, California in July. The teams in each tournament were only identified with vague geographic names such as North, South, East, West and California. A game streamed on Facebook received 60,000 views while a practice received 30,000 views.

== Players and Coaches ==
Coaches with long NFL or college experience included quarterback coach Terry Shea, Steve Fairchild, Donnie Henderson, Dennis Creehan and Art Valero (offensive line).

For the April games, the league had four teams and 105 players. Its players included NFL veterans Fred Jackson, Anthony "Boobie" Dixon, Ben Tate, Greg Hardy, Ricky Stanzi, McLeod Bethel-Thompson and Ahmad Bradshaw. The players ranged from two to 10 years out from college.

== Games ==
Date	Team	score	opponent	score	Notes	Ref
April 15	East	6	West	10		
April 16	North	14	South	10		
April 22	South	-	East	-	Cancelled	
April 23	North	-	West	-	Cancelled	
April 25	Orange	34	Black	7	Championship Game	

== Signees to professional leagues ==
The following players signed with NFL or CFL teams following their involvement with The Spring League in 2017:

- McLeod Bethel-Thompson, a quarterback, signed with the Toronto Argonauts on May 23. During his first year with the team, Bethel-Thompson served as a backup quarterback, and also played as a defensive back and on special teams during the CFL preseason. Bethel-Thompson won the 105th Grey Cup with the Argonauts later in the year. Beginning in week 8 of the 2018 season, Bethel-Thompson was named the Argos starting quarterback.
- Zeek Bigger, a linebacker, signed with the Carolina Panthers on May 30, after participating in OTAs on a tryout basis. Bigger was released at the end of the preseason, but spent two weeks on Carolina's practice squad.
- Manasseh Garner, a tight end, signed with the Washington Redskins on May 15 following their rookie mini-camp. Garner was cut following the preseason, but was signed to the practice squad, and was later promoted to the active roster for the final game of the season.
- Cornerback Tyquwan Glass was signed to the Los Angeles Rams on August 22. Glass was released as part of final cuts.
- Tight end David Grinnage was signed by the Jacksonville Jaguars just prior to the preseason on August 14. Grinnage did not make the team, but was given a spot on Jacksonville's practice squad.
- Defensive lineman Calvin Heurtelou was signed by the Green Bay Packers on August 21. Heurtelou was waived after the preseason.
- Daje Johnson, wide receiver, signed with the Ottawa Redblacks. After playing the first three weeks of the regular season on the practice roster, Johnson was promoted to be the starting returner for Week 4. After playing two games, Johnson was placed on the injured list, and was later released on August 9.
- Wide receiver Jalen Saunders signed with the Hamilton Tiger-Cats on May 23. After two weeks on the practice roster, Saunders made his CFL debut in Week 3. Saunders finished the 2017 CFL season with over 1,000 yards receiving.
- Quarterback Ricky Stanzi signed with the Calgary Stampeders on May 16 as a backup quarterback.
- Tani Tupou, a fullback/defensive tackle, signed with the Atlanta Falcons on May 14 following their mini-camp. Tupou was the first Spring League player to be signed by a professional team. Tupou was released after the preseason, but was signed to Atlanta's practice squad. He spent time on the active roster as well this year.
- Wide receiver Griff Whalen was signed by the Baltimore Ravens on July 21, following his participation in the Summer Showcase game. Whalen was released following the preseason, but later spent two games with the Ravens before being cut again. Whalen then signed with the Oakland Raiders during the offseason.
- Running back Josh Robinson received a workout with the Detroit Lions in August 2017, but went unsigned until he agreed to terms with the Montreal Alouettes of the CFL in January 2018.

== Spring League Showcase ==
On July 15, 2017, the Spring League Showcase was held at Napa Memorial Stadium in California between Spring League California, coached by Terry Shea and Spring League East, coached by Donnie Henderson. Flofootball.com's FloPRO subscription service streamed the game. David Ash started the game for the California roster and lead several scoring drives. He had 96 passing yards and 9-of-13 passing, including a 4-yard touchdown pass to Anthony Dixon with an interception and 3 runs for a total of 10 yards with his longest for 9 yards. For the East, two quarterbacks, Casey Pachall and Trenton Norvell, made touchdown passes. Pachall completed 4-of-6 passes for 84 yards and a 67-yard touchdown. The game's top rusher was Paul Harris of the East team, who rushed twice for 74 yards and a 6-yard touchdown. East defeated California 23–19.

Notable players:

- Spring League California: David Ash, Quarterback; Glen Coffee, Diondre Borel, DiAndre Campbell, Jabari Carr, Anthony Ezeakunne, Joshua Hill, Fred Jackson, Jordan James, Gabriel Manzanares, Thierry Nguema, Tyrone Ward, Griff Whalen.
- Spring League East: Quarterbacks: Casey Pachall, Trenton Norvell; Anthony Dixon, Greg Hardy, Paul Harris, Nick Kasa, Dontre Wilson and Josh Robinson.

== Reception ==
The league indicated two CFL and 10 NFL teams had their scouts visit the league while another 20 made requests for video footage. Following the April games, roughly two dozen players were invited to NFL rookie mini-camps. The Carolina Panthers picked up six for their rookie mini-camp.

After the first season, NFL scouts seemed to like the league structure but otherwise gave mixed responses. Value was perceived by scouts as they got updated information on forgotten players or saw a player with a conditioned arm, but otherwise the talent level was below what NFL teams expected for an established developmental league. Some scouts expected younger players that had been to a couple NFL training camp but in the wrong system. Woods indicated that the older and big names brought attention to the league, which has a secondary purpose of providing a veteran annual showcase.
