= Michael Bandy =

American football player (born 1997)

No. 83 – Denver Broncos
- Positions: Wide receiver, Punt returner
- Roster status: Practice squad

Personal information
- Born: December 5, 1997 (age 28); La Mirada, California, U.S.
- Listed height: 5 ft 10 in (1.78 m)
- Listed weight: 190 lb (86 kg)

Career information
- High school: Servite (Anaheim, California)
- College: San Diego (2016–2019)
- NFL draft: 2020: undrafted

Career history
- TSL Conquerors (2020–2021); Los Angeles Chargers (2021–2022); Houston Roughnecks (2023); Denver Broncos (2023–present)

Awards and highlights
- 2× First-team FCS All-American (2018, 2019); 2× First-team All-PFL (2018, 2019)

Career NFL statistics as of 2025
- Receptions: 14
- Receiving yards: 139
- Receiving touchdowns: 1
- Return yards: 117
- Stats at Pro Football Reference

Michael Bandy (born December 5, 1997) is an American professional football wide receiver and punt returner for the Denver Broncos of the National Football League (NFL). He played college football for the San Diego Toreros. He has also played for the Los Angeles Chargers and the Houston Roughnecks of the XFL.

== College career ==
Bandy was a member of the San Diego Toreros for four seasons. He finished his career with 192 receptions for 3,294 receiving yards and 28 receiving touchdowns. Holds NCAA FCS record for most yards per reception minimum 10 32.4

== Professional career ==
Pre-draft measurables
Height	Weight	Arm length	Hand span	Wingspan
5 ft 9 1/2 in (1.77 m)	195 lb (88 kg)	29 1/2 in (0.75 m)	9 in (0.23 m)	5 ft 10 in (1.78 m)
All values from Pro Day

=== The Spring League ===
Bandy initially played in The Spring League after going unselected in the 2020 NFL draft. He played for the TSL Conquerors in 2020 and 2021.

=== Los Angeles Chargers ===
Bandy signed with the Los Angeles Chargers on June 18, 2021. He was waived on August 16, but was re-signed four days later. Bandy was waived again on August 31, during final roster cuts and was re-signed to the practice squad the following day. He was elevated to the active roster on December 26, for the team's Week 16 game against the Houston Texans and made his NFL debut in the game. He signed a reserve/future contract with the Chargers on January 11, 2022.

On August 30, 2022, Bandy was waived by the Chargers and signed to the practice squad the next day. He was promoted to the active roster on October 22.

=== Houston Roughnecks ===
After becoming a free agent on March 15, 2023, Bandy signed with the Houston Roughnecks on March 29. He played in two games for the Roughnecks and caught five passes for 35 yards. Bandy was released from his contract on July 29.

=== Denver Broncos ===
On July 28, 2023, Bandy signed with the Denver Broncos. He was waived by Denver on August 29, and was subsequently re-signed to the team's practice squad. Bandy was promoted to the active roster on December 30.

On August 27, 2024, Bandy was waived by the Broncos. The next day, he was re-signed to the practice squad.

On January 15, 2025, Bandy signed a futures contract with the Broncos. On August 26, Bandy was waived by the Broncos. He was re-signed to the practice squad the following day. On November 2, Bandy was active for the Broncos' game against the Houston Texans, recording one reception for 16 yards, his first reception in the NFL since 2022. He also served as the punt returner for the game with Marvin Mims out due to a concussion, but fumbled on a muffed punt return. On November 6, Bandy was promoted to the active roster. On November 11, he was waived and subsequently re-signed to the practice squad. After being elevated from the practice squad for Week 15 against the Green Bay Packers, Bandy scored his first career touchdown on a pass from Bo Nix, helping fuel Denver to a 34–26 victory.

After the conclusion of the 2025 season, Bandy's practice squad contract expired and he became a free agent. On February 18, 2026, Bandy was re-signed by the Broncos, immediately adding him to their offseason roster. On August 30, Bandy was waived by Denver as a part of final roster cuts; he was re-signed to the practice squad the next day.
