= Keller Chryst =

American football player and coach (born 1995)

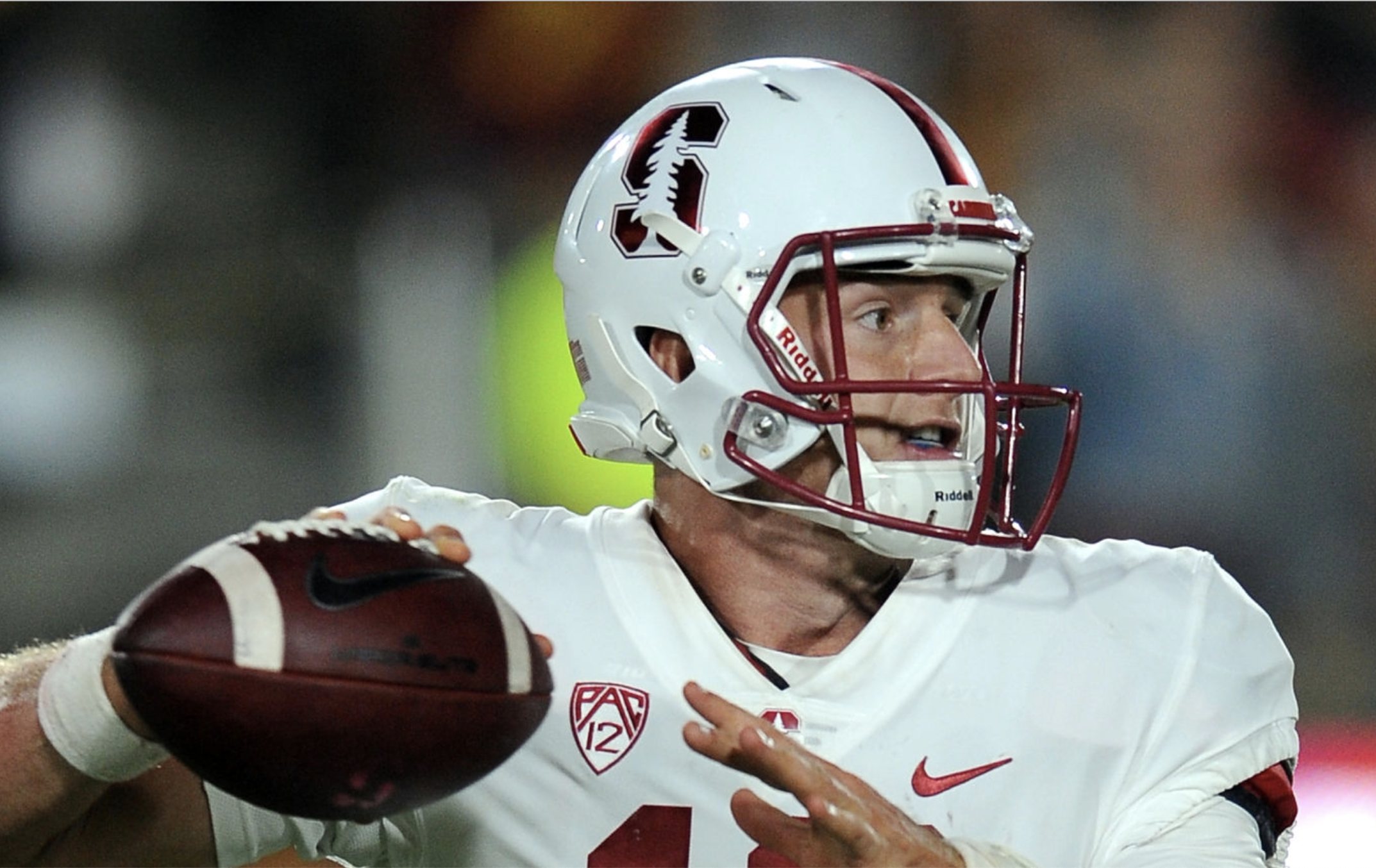
- Chryst at Stanford

Seattle Seahawks
- Title: Defensive quality control coach

Personal information
- Born: November 17, 1995 (age 30); Lake Forest, Illinois, U.S.
- Listed height: 6 ft 4 in (1.93 m)
- Listed weight: 239 lb (108 kg)

Career information
- Position: Quarterback
- High school: Palo Alto (Palo Alto, California)
- College: Stanford (2014–2017); Tennessee (2018)
- NFL draft: 2019: undrafted

Career history

Playing
- TSL Aviators (2020–2021)

Coaching
- Wisconsin (2021–2022) (GA); Iowa (2023–2024) (Offensive analyst); Seattle Seahawks (2025) (Special Projects); Seattle Seahawks (2026–present) (Defensive quality control)

Awards and highlights
- Super Bowl champion (LX)

Keller Joseph Chryst (born November 17, 1995) is an American former football quarterback. He played college football at Tennessee and Stanford.

== Early life ==
Chryst attended Weddington High School in Weddington, North Carolina for his freshman year before transferring to Palo Alto High School in Palo Alto, California. During his career he passed for 7,326 yards and 85 touchdowns. Chryst was considered a four-star recruit and ranked among the top quarterbacks in his class. He committed to Stanford University to play college football.

== College career ==
=== Stanford ===
==== 2014–2015 seasons ====
After red-shirting his first year at Stanford in 2014, Chryst appeared in four games as a backup to Kevin Hogan. As Hogan's backup, Chryst completed five of nine passes for 59 yards and a touchdown.

==== 2016 season ====
Chryst made his debut as the starting quarterback on October 29, throwing for 104 yards and two touchdowns against Arizona. On November 12, Chryst threw three touchdowns and 258 yards in a 52–27 rout against Oregon. The next week, he threw two touchdowns and 198 yards as well as running for another score in a 45–31 win over California at the 119th annual Big Game. At the regular-season finale, Chryst threw for two touchdowns and 154 yards against Rice. He also ran for a 62-yard touchdown, the second longest rushing touchdown of the season for the Cardinal, behind a 90-yard touchdown by Christian McCaffrey against California. It is also the longest touchdown run by a quarterback in Stanford history. In his five starts in the regular season, Chryst went 5–0, throwing nine touchdowns and only one interception, including 774 passing yards.

At the 2016 Sun Bowl, Chryst threw a touchdown and left in the second quarter with a knee injury in a 25–23 win over North Carolina.

==== 2017 season ====
Chryst was voted team captain for Stanford in the 2017 season. He started for the 2017 regular-season opener, throwing two touchdowns and 253 yards in a 62–7 rout against Rice. Against Oregon, he threw for 181 yards and three touchdowns in the 49–7 win. The following week, Chryst led a fourth quarter game-winning drive against Oregon State in Corvallis. He completed a pass to J.J. Arcega-Whiteside on a fade route with 20 seconds left to win the game. Earlier in that drive, he completed a 25 yard pass to Kaden Smith on 4th and 10. He appeared in seven games and finished with 962 passing yards, eight touchdowns, and four interceptions.

=== Tennessee ===
After graduating from Stanford in June, Chryst joined Tennessee as a graduate transfer. He competed for the Volunteers' starting quarterback job with Jarrett Guarantano.

On September 8, 2018, Chryst threw his first touchdown with Tennessee against ETSU. Against #1 Alabama, Chryst replaced Guarantano when he was injured in the second quarter. He led the Vols on two consecutive drives that ended in passing touchdowns. Chryst appeared in six games and threw for 450 yards, three touchdowns, and two interceptions.

Having only been on campus since June, he won the 2018 Tennessee MY ALL award and was named as a team captain.

=== Statistics ===
Season	Team	Games			Passing								Rushing			
Season	Team	GP	GS	Record	Cmp	Att	Pct	Yds	Y/A	TD	Int	Rtg	Att	Yds	Avg	TD
2014	Stanford	Redshirt														
2015	Stanford	4	0	—	5	9	55.6	59	6.6	1	0	147.3	6	10	1.7	0
2016	Stanford	12	6	6–0	77	136	56.6	905	6.7	10	2	133.8	41	159	3.9	2
2017	Stanford	7	7	5–2	78	144	54.2	962	6.7	8	4	123.1	19	-5	-0.3	1
2018	Tennessee	8	0	—	23	51	45.1	450	8.8	3	2	130.8	5	3	0.6	0
Career		31	13	11–2	183	340	53.8	2,376	7.0	22	8	129.2	71	167	2.4	3

== Professional career ==
Pre-draft measurables
Height	Weight	Arm length	Hand span	Wingspan	40-yard dash	10-yard split	20-yard split	20-yard shuttle	Three-cone drill	Vertical jump	Broad jump
6 ft 4 1/8 in (1.93 m)	239 lb (108 kg)	33 in (0.84 m)	10 3/8 in (0.26 m)	6 ft 7 1/8 in (2.01 m)	4.90 s	1.69 s	2.79 s	4.44 s	7.09 s	35.0 in (0.89 m)	9 ft 6 in (2.90 m)
All values from Pro Day

=== The Spring League ===
Chryst participated in The Spring League's Denver showcase event on July 17, 2020. He passed for 142 yards and two touchdowns in The Spring League showcase game.

Chryst was selected by the Aviators of The Spring League during its player selection draft on October 12, 2020. He remained on the Aviators' roster for the 2021 season.

== Coaching career ==
=== Wisconsin ===
For two seasons, Chryst was a graduate assistant at Wisconsin in 2021 and 2022.

=== Iowa ===
For two seasons at Iowa, Chryst was an offensive analyst in 2023 and 2024.

=== Seattle Seahawks ===
Chryst made the jump to the NFL and joined the Seattle Seahawks prior to the 2025 season. He worked in special projects in the 2025 season. He was part of the Super Bowl-winning staff. Prior to the 2026 season, he was moved to defensive quality control.

== Personal life ==
Chryst's father Geep was a coach in the National Football League (NFL). His uncle Paul was the head coach of the Wisconsin Badgers from 2015–2022. His brother, Jackson, is a quarterback at Oregon State.
