= Anthony Morris (American football) =

American football player (born 1992)

No. 79
- Position: Offensive tackle

Personal information
- Born: March 25, 1992 (age 34); Memphis, Tennessee, U.S.
- Listed height: 6 ft 6 in (1.98 m)
- Listed weight: 290 lb (132 kg)

Career information
- High school: Germantown (Germantown, Tennessee)
- College: Tennessee State
- NFL draft: 2015: 7th round, 218th overall pick

Career history
- Oakland Raiders (2015); Montreal Alouettes (2017–2018); Memphis Express (2019); Los Angeles Wildcats (2020); TSL Conquerors (2021)
- Stats at Pro Football Reference

Anthony Morris (born March 25, 1992) is an American former professional football player who was an offensive tackle in the National Football League (NFL). He played college football for the Tennessee State Tigers. He was selected in the seventh round (218th overall) of the 2015 NFL draft by the Oakland Raiders.

== College career ==
As a freshman at Tennessee State University, Morris played in eight games. As a sophomore, he played in five games. He was named a full-time starter as a junior in 2013, when he played in 11 games. As a senior, he appeared in 11 games, with 10 starts.

== Professional career ==
Morris was selected by the Oakland Raiders in the seventh round (218th overall) of the 2015 NFL draft. He signed his rookie contract on May 12, 2015. He was released during final cuts on September 5, 2015, with an injury designation. On September 6, he was placed on injured reserve. He was taken off of injured reserve on September 28 when he was released.

Morris signed with the Toronto Argonauts of the Canadian Football League on March 2, 2017.

He signed with the Memphis Express of the Alliance of American Football in 2018 for the 2019 season. He was placed on injured reserve on March 7, 2019, and activated from injured reserve on April 1. The league ceased operations in April 2019.

Morris was selected by the Los Angeles Wildcats of the XFL in the 10th round in phase 2 of the 2020 XFL draft. He was placed on injured reserve on December 17, 2019. He had his contract terminated when the league suspended operations on April 10, 2020.

Morris signed with the Conquerors of The Spring League in May 2021.
