= David Grinnage =

American football player (born 1994)

Profile
- Position: Tight end

Personal information
- Born: February 24, 1994 (age 32); Newark, Delaware
- Listed height: 6 ft 5 in (1.96 m)
- Listed weight: 265 lb (120 kg)

Career information
- High school: Newark (Newark, Delaware)
- College: NC State
- NFL draft: 2016: undrafted

Career history
- Green Bay Packers (2016)*; Jacksonville Jaguars (2017–2018); TSL Blues (2020–2021)
- * Offseason or practice squad member only

Career NFL statistics
- Receptions: 6
- Receiving yards: 61
- Receiving touchdowns: 0
- Stats at Pro Football Reference

David Grinnage (born February 4, 1994) is an American football tight end. He played college football for NC State.

== College career ==
Grinnage attended and played college football at NC State.

=== Collegiate statistics ===
David Grinnage
| Year | School | Conf | Class | Pos | G | Rec | Yds | Avg | TD |
| 2013 | NC State | ACC | FR | TE | 10 | 15 | 150 | 10.0 | 1 |
| 2014 | NC State | ACC | SO | TE | 11 | 27 | 358 | 13.3 | 5 |
| 2015 | NC State | ACC | JR | TE | 10 | 25 | 290 | 11.6 | 3 |
| Career | NC State | | | | | 67 | 798 | 11.9 | 9 |

== Professional career ==
=== Green Bay Packers ===
Grinnage signed with Green Bay Packers as an undrafted free agent, but was released three days later on May 11, 2016.

=== Jacksonville Jaguars ===
Grinnage was signed by the Jacksonville Jaguars on August 14, 2017. He was waived on September 2, 2017, and was signed to the practice squad the next day. He signed a reserve/future contract with the Jaguars on January 22, 2018.

On September 1, 2018, Grinnage was waived by the Jaguars and was signed to the practice squad the next day. He was promoted to the active roster to replace injured tight end Austin Seferian-Jenkins. Grinnage made his NFL debut and caught his first career pass, a seven-yard reception, on October 14, 2018, in a 40–7 loss to the Dallas Cowboys. He was waived on November 12, 2018.

=== The Spring League ===
Grinnage was selected by the Blues of The Spring League in their player selection draft on October 10, 2020.
