= Bunmi Rotimi =

American football player (born 1995)

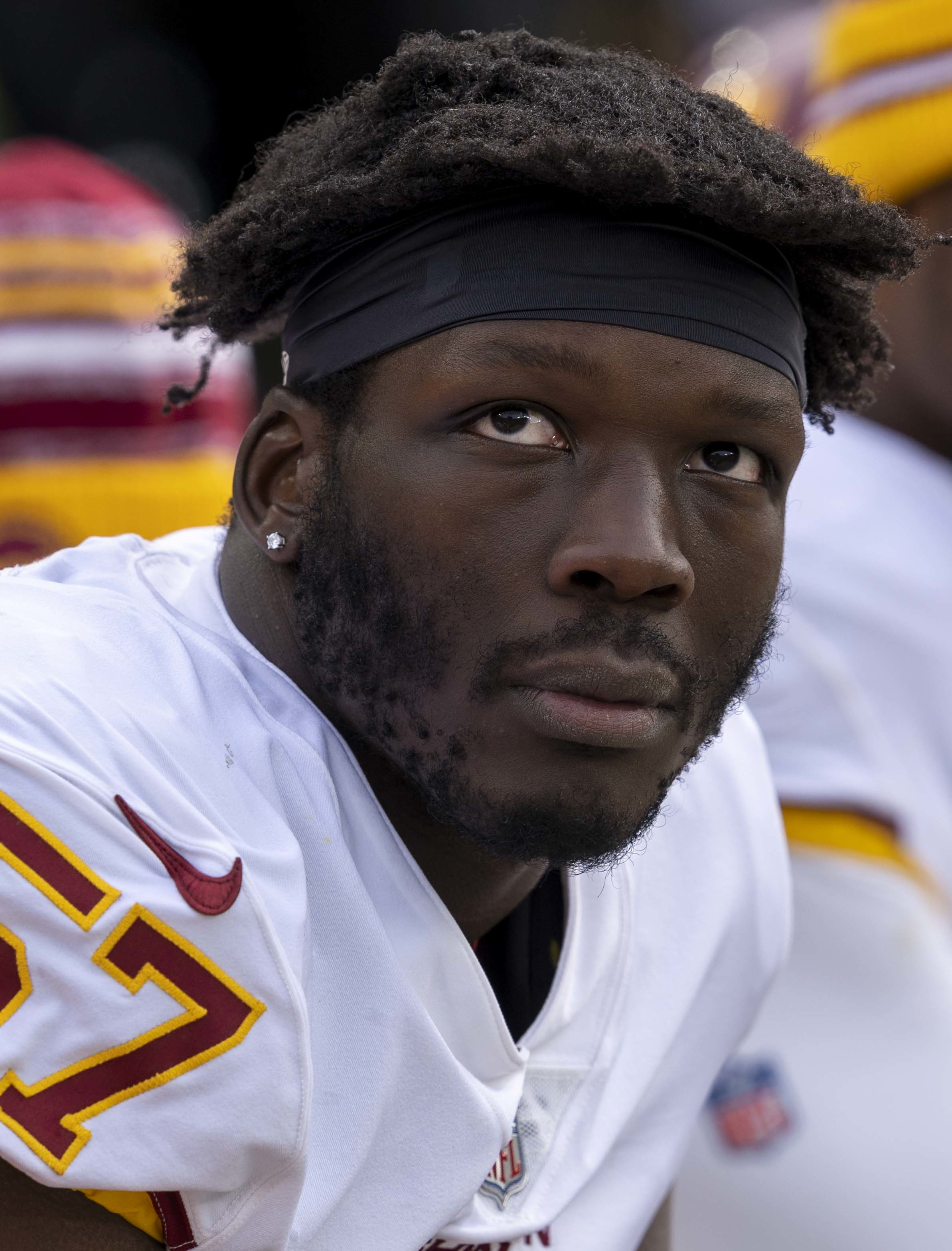
- Rotimi with the Washington Football Team in 2021

Profile
- Position: Defensive end

Personal information
- Born: July 16, 1995 (age 31); Alexandria, Virginia, U.S.
- Listed height: 6 ft 3 in (1.91 m)
- Listed weight: 270 lb (122 kg)

Career information
- High school: West Potomac (Alexandria)
- College: Old Dominion
- NFL draft: 2018: undrafted

Career history
- Chicago Bears (2018)*; Arizona Hotshots (2019); New York Guardians (2020); TSL Jousters (2021); Washington Football Team (2021); Arlington Renegades (2023–2024)
- * Offseason or practice squad member only

Awards and highlights
- XFL champion (2023)

Career NFL statistics
- Total tackles: 10
- Sacks: 1.0
- Stats at Pro Football Reference

Olubunmi Babatunde Rotimi Jr. (born July 16, 1995) is an American professional football defensive end. He played college football at Old Dominion and signed with the Chicago Bears as an undrafted free agent in 2018. Rotimi has also played for the Arizona Hotshots of the Alliance of American Football (AAF) and the New York Guardians of the XFL.

== Early life and education ==
Bunmi Rotimi was born on July 16, 1995, in Alexandria, Virginia, to African immigrants. He attended West Potomac High School, earning all-district honors as a junior, even though his freshman year was the first year he tried playing the sport. Following high school he went to Old Dominion University, where he spent his true freshman year of 2013 as a redshirt. A walk-on, Rotimi played in twelve games as a freshman, starting two at defensive tackle. He recorded 30 tackles in the season.

As a sophomore, Rotimi played in twelve games, starting eleven and recording 36 tackles. He also was second on the team with 4.5 sacks. He transitioned to defensive end as a junior, starting thirteen games, and making 44 tackles and seven sacks. He started seven games as a senior, making 29 tackles and 5.5 sacks. Against Marshall, Rotimi made a blocked field goal. He was named all-Conference USA honorable mention following his senior season.

== Professional career ==
Pre-draft measurables
Height	Weight	Arm length	Hand span	40-yard dash	10-yard split	20-yard split	20-yard shuttle	Three-cone drill	Vertical jump	Broad jump	Bench press
6 ft 3 1/8 in (1.91 m)	273 lb (124 kg)	34 7/8 in (0.89 m)	9 3/4 in (0.25 m)	5.05 s	1.76 s	2.94 s	4.70 s	7.42 s	32.0 in (0.81 m)	9 ft 5 in (2.87 m)	21 reps
All values from NFL Combine/Pro Day

=== Chicago Bears ===
After only competing at five NFL Combine drills, Rotimi went unselected in the 2018 NFL draft. He was signed as an undrafted free agent by the Chicago Bears on May 11. He was released in July before the preseason started.

=== Arizona Hotshots ===
His next team after Chicago was the Arizona Hotshots of the Alliance of American Football (AAF). He appeared in five games, making six tackles and a sack before the league folded.

=== New York Guardians ===
After the Hotshots folded, Rotimi was signed by the New York Guardians of the XFL. He played in five games again, making 25 tackles before the league suspended.

=== Washington Football Team ===
Rotimi signed with the Washington Football Team on July 28, 2021. He was released during the team's final roster cuts but signed with their practice squad the following day. He was signed to the active roster on November 13, 2021. He made his first career sack in Week 15 against the Philadelphia Eagles.

On March 16, 2022, the team placed an exclusive-rights free agent tender on Rotimi. He was placed on injured reserve on August 22, 2022, and was released with an injury settlement a week later.

=== Arlington Renegades ===
Rotimi played for the Arlington Renegades of the XFL in 2023. He re-signed with the team on January 29, 2024.
