= Mazzi Wilkins =

American football player (born 1995)

No. 37, 39
- Position: Cornerback

Personal information
- Born: October 12, 1995 (age 31); Tampa, Florida, U.S.
- Listed height: 6 ft 0 in (1.83 m)
- Listed weight: 191 lb (87 kg)

Career information
- High school: Henry B. Plant (Tampa)
- College: South Florida
- NFL draft: 2019: undrafted

Career history
- Tampa Bay Buccaneers (2019–2020); TSL Alphas (2021); Winnipeg Blue Bombers (2021)*; Arizona Cardinals (2021)*; Baltimore Ravens (2021); Philadelphia Stars (2022–2023)
- * Offseason or practice squad member only

Career NFL statistics
- Total tackles: 3
- Stats at Pro Football Reference

Mazzi Wilkins (born October 12, 1995) is an American former professional football player who was a cornerback in the National Football League (NFL). He played college football for the South Florida Bulls.

== College career ==
Wilkins was a member of the South Florida Bulls for five seasons, redshirting his true freshman year. He finished his collegiate career with 110 tackles, 22 passes defensed, three interceptions, and one fumble recovery in 47 games played, of which he started 22.

== Professional career ==
=== Tampa Bay Buccaneers ===
Wilkins signed with the Tampa Bay Buccaneers as an undrafted free agent on July 23, 2019. Wilkins was waived at the end of training camp during final roster cuts, but was re-signed to the team's practice squad on September 1, 2019. The Buccaneers promoted Wilkins to the active roster on November 13, 2019. He made his NFL debut on December 1, 2019, against the Jacksonville Jaguars, making two tackles in a 28–11 win.

Wilkins was waived by the Buccaneers during final roster cuts on September 5, 2020, and was signed to the practice squad the following day. He was elevated to the active roster on September 12 for the team's Week 1 game against the New Orleans Saints, and reverted to the practice squad the day after the game. He was promoted to the active roster on September 19, 2020, but was waived two days later. The Buccaneers re-signed him to their practice squad on October 19. He was released on January 5, 2021.

Wilkins signed with the Alphas of The Spring League in May 2021.

=== Winnipeg Blue Bombers ===
Wilkins signed with the Winnipeg Blue Bombers of the CFL on June 22, 2021. He was released on July 27, 2021.

=== Arizona Cardinals ===
On September 22, 2021, the Arizona Cardinals signed Wilkins to their practice squad. He was released on September 29, 2021.

=== Baltimore Ravens ===
On October 4, 2021, the Baltimore Ravens signed Wilkins to their practice squad.

=== Philadelphia Stars ===
On February 22, 2022, the Philadelphia Stars selected Wilkins in the 10th round of the inaugural draft of the newly revived United States Football League, He was taken as the 18th overall cornerback selected.

Wilkins was placed on the team's injured reserve list on May 18, 2023.

He became a free agent after the 2023 season.

=== NFL career statistics ===
Legend
	Led the league
**Bold**	Career high

Year	Team	GP	GS	Tackles				Interceptions					Fumbles	
Year	Team	GP	GS	Comb	Total	Ast	Sack	PD	Int	Yds	Avg	TDs	FF	FR
2019	TB	5	5	3	3	0	0.0	0	0	0	0.0	0	0	0
2020	TB	1	0	0	0	0	0.0	0	0	0	0.0	0	0	0
2021	BAL	-	-	-	-	-	-	-	-	-	-	-	-	-
Total		6	5	3	3	0	0	0	0	0	0	0	0	0
Source: NFL.com
