= Reece Horn =

American gridiron football player (born 1993)

No. 17 – IBM Big Blue (X-League)
- Position: Wide receiver

Personal information
- Born: February 1, 1993 (age 33); Carmel, Indiana, U.S.
- Listed height: 6 ft 3 in (1.91 m)
- Listed weight: 222 lb (101 kg)

Career information
- High school: Cathedral (Indianapolis, Indiana)
- College: Indianapolis
- NFL draft: 2016: undrafted

Career history
- Tennessee Titans (2016)*; Milano Seamen (2017); Vienna Vikings (2018); Memphis Express (2019); Miami Dolphins (2019)*; Tampa Bay Vipers (2020); TSL Linemen (2021); Cincinnati Bengals (2021)*; Calgary Stampeders (2022)*; Frankfurt Galaxy (2022–2023); Vienna Vikings (2024–2025); IBM Big Blue (2026–present)
- * Offseason or practice squad member only

Awards and highlights
- 3× First-team All-GLVC (2013, 2014, 2015); GLVC Offensive Player of the Year (2014); GLVC Special Teams Player of the Year (2015); AFCA All-America (2015); D2CCA All-America First-team (2015); D2Football.com All-America First-team (2015); Italian Football League Champion (2017); TSL champion (2021)

Reece Horn (born February 1, 1993) is an American football wide receiver. He played college football at University of Indianapolis. He spent time in camp with three NFL teams, the Tennessee Titans, Miami Dolphins, Cincinnati Bengals, as well as with the CFL and other North American leagues. In Europe, Horn also played for the Vienna Vikings in the 2018 Austrian Football League and the Milano Seamen in the 2017 Italian Football League, both teams moved in 2021 to the new European League of Football (ELF) which also revived old NFL Europe team logos. In June, 2022 Horn joined the Frankfurt Galaxy of the ELF, and returned for a full 2023 season.

== College career ==
Horn played at the University of Indianapolis from 2012 to 2015. He played in 48 career games, recording 272 catches for 3,562 yards and 31 touchdowns.

== Professional career ==
=== Tennessee Titans ===
Horn went undrafted in the 2016 NFL draft. On June 3, 2016, Horn signed with the Tennessee Titans. On August 28, 2016, Horn was released by the Titans.

=== Milano Seamen ===
In 2017, Horn signed with Milano Seamen in the Italian Football League. He had 62 receptions, 1,142 yards, and 12 touchdowns for the season in 11 games. The Seamen won the Italian Bowl championship game over the rival Rhinos Milano.

=== Vienna Vikings ===
On December 30, 2017, Horn signed with the Vienna Vikings of the Austrian Football League (AFL). In the 2018 season with Vienna, Horn had 50 receptions, 771 yards, 14 Touchdowns in 12 games. The Vikings lost to the Swarco Raiders Tirol in the 2018 Austrian Bowl (AFL) championship game.

=== Memphis Express ===
In 2019, Horn joined the Memphis Express for the season. He had 28 catches on 42 targets, 429 yards, and one touchdown in 7 games played.

=== Miami Dolphins ===
On April 9, 2019, Horn signed with the Miami Dolphins. Horn produced a touchdown reception in his only preseason action. On August 31, 2019, Horn was released by the Dolphins.

=== Tampa Bay Vipers ===
Horn was drafted with the 60th pick in the 8th round of the 2020 XFL draft by the Tampa Bay Vipers of the XFL. He had 27 receptions, 240 yards, and one touchdown. He had his contract terminated when the league suspended operations on April 10, 2020.

Horn signed with the Linemen of The Spring League in May 2021. He led the team to win the league championship as the top receiver.

=== Cincinnati Bengals ===
Horn was signed by the Cincinnati Bengals on July 26, 2021. He was waived on August 16, 2021.

=== Calgary Stampeders ===
Horn signed with the Calgary Stampeders of the CFL on February 1, 2022. Horn was released by the Stampeders during final roster cuts on June 4.

=== Frankfurt Galaxy ===
Horn was signed by the Frankfurt Galaxy of the European League of Football during the 2022 season. In the final 8 games Horn played in the regular season, he had 39 receptions for 683 yards and 11 touchdowns. The Galaxy finished the season with an 8–4 record. Horne played the full 2023 season. He finished the season with 61 receptions for 875 yards and 8 Touchdowns in 12 games.

=== Vienna Vikings (second stint) ===
On May 29, 2024, Horn signed with the Vienna Vikings of the European League of Football. The Vikings finished the regular season unbeaten 12–0. Horn finished the regular season playing 11 games, catching 75 passes for 1164 Yards, and 13 touchdowns.

=== IBM Big Blue ===
On April 1, 2026, Horn signed with the IBM Big Blue of the X-League. Horn made his debut in the season opener against Fuji Xerox Minerva AFC, recording a team-high eight receptions for 59 yards and an eight-yard touchdown reception from Jiya Wright in a 14–7 loss. In the Big Blue's next game, he recorded nine receptions for 94 yards and two touchdowns in a 24–12 victory over Nojima Sagamihara Rise.

== Career statistics ==
=== Professional ===
Year	Team	Games		Receiving				
Year	Team	GP	GS	Rec	Yds	Avg	Lng	TD
2017	MS	11	11	62	1,142	18.4	74	12
2018	VV	12	12	50	771	15.4	55	14
2019	MEM	8	7	28	429	15.3	39	1
2020	TB	5	4	27	240	8.9	24	1
2022	FGY	8	8	39	683	17.5	66	11
2023	FGY	12	12	61	875	14.3	53	8
2024	VV	11	10	75	1,164	15.5	49	13
2025	VV	12	11	58	677	11.7	59	15
Career		79	75	402	5,881	14.6	74	75

=== College ===
Year	Team	Games		Receiving				Punt returns			
Year	Team	GP	GS	Rec	Yds	Avg	TD	Ret	Yds	Avg	TD
2011	Indianapolis	Redshirted (redshirt)									
2012	Indianapolis	13	3	26	243	9.3	4	0	0	0.0	0
2013	Indianapolis	12	12	70	877	12.5	7	0	0	0.0	0
2014	Indianapolis	11	11	68	1,046	15.4	12	15	175	11.7	0
2015	Indianapolis	12	12	108	1,396	12.9	8	12	316	26.3	2
Career		48	38	272	3,562	13.1	31	27	491	18.2	2
