= Elijah Qualls =

American football player (born 1995)

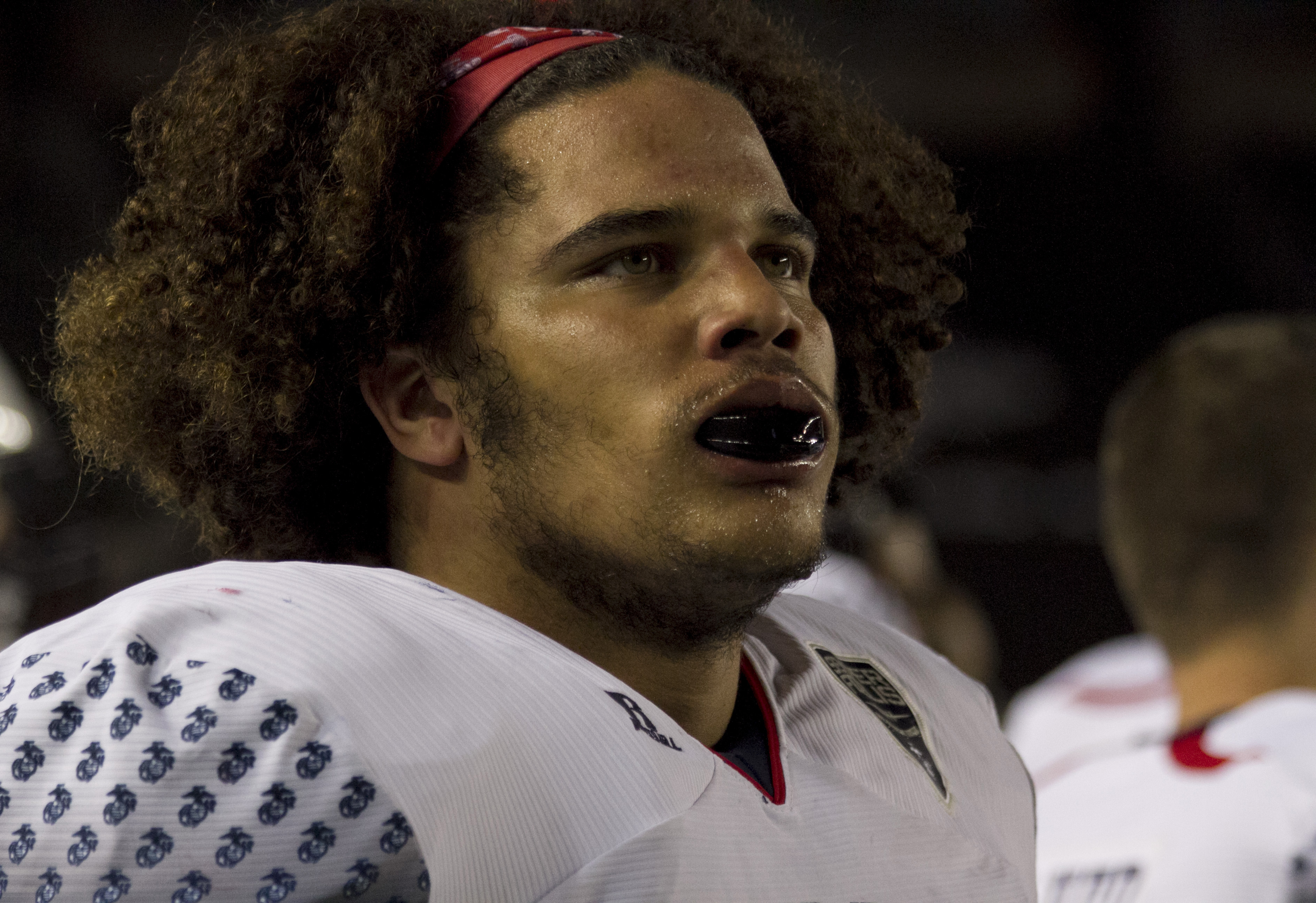
- Qualls at the Semper Fidelis All-American Bowl in 2013

No. 98, 92
- Position: Nose tackle

Personal information
- Born: February 11, 1995 (age 31); Petaluma, California, U.S.
- Listed height: 6 ft 1 in (1.85 m)
- Listed weight: 337 lb (153 kg)

Career information
- High school: Casa Grande (Petaluma)
- College: Washington
- NFL draft: 2017: 6th round, 214th overall pick

Career history
- Philadelphia Eagles (2017); Carolina Panthers (2018–2019)*; Baltimore Ravens (2019)*; Tampa Bay Buccaneers (2019)*; DC Defenders (2020); TSL Linemen (2021); New York Giants (2021)*; BC Lions (2022); Houston Roughnecks (2023)*
- * Offseason or practice squad member only

Awards and highlights
- Super Bowl champion (LII); First Team All-Pac-12 (2016)

Career NFL statistics
- Total tackles: 4
- Stats at Pro Football Reference

Elijah Qualls (born February 11, 1995) is an American former professional football player who was a nose tackle in the National Football League (NFL). He played college football for the Washington Huskies.

== Early life ==
Qualls attended Casa Grande High School in Petaluma, California. He played defensive tackle, center and running back. The California native was a prized recruit, and ran for over 1,800 yards and 23 touchdowns in his final two years in high school. He committed to the University of Washington to play college football.

== College career ==
After redshirting his first year at Washington in 2013, Qualls played in all 14 games in 2014, recording 13 tackles. In 2015, he played in 10 games with eight starts and had 26 tackles and 4.5 sacks. As a junior in 2016, he was named first-team All-Pac-12 Conference after recording 38 tackles and three sacks. After the season, Qualls decided to forgo his senior year and enter the 2017 NFL draft.

== Professional career ==
=== Philadelphia Eagles ===
The Philadelphia Eagles selected Qualls in the sixth round (214th overall) of the 2017 NFL draft. On May 11, the Eagles signed Qualls to a four-year, $2.52 million contract with a signing bonus of $127,204. Qualls ended his rookie season with a Super Bowl ring after the Eagles defeated the New England Patriots 41–33 in Super Bowl LII.

On September 1, 2018, Qualls was waived by the Eagles.

=== Carolina Panthers ===
On December 20, 2018, Qualls was signed to the practice squad of the Carolina Panthers. He signed a reserve/future contract with the Panthers on December 31, 2018. He was waived on July 24, 2019.

=== Baltimore Ravens ===
On August 10, 2019, Qualls was signed by the Baltimore Ravens, but was waived five days later.

=== Tampa Bay Buccaneers ===
On August 19, 2019, Qualls signed with the Tampa Bay Buccaneers. He was waived during final roster cuts on August 30, 2019.

=== DC Defenders ===
In October 2019, Qualls was selected by the DC Defenders of the XFL in the third round of the 2020 XFL draft. He had his contract terminated when the league suspended operations on April 10, 2020.

=== New York Giants ===
On August 11, 2021, Qualls signed with the New York Giants. He was waived on August 31, 2021.

=== B.C. Lions ===
Qualls signed with the BC Lions of the Canadian Football League (CFL) on April 21, 2022.

=== Houston Roughnecks ===
On November 17, 2022, Qualls was drafted by the Houston Roughnecks of the XFL.
