= James Tyrrell (disambiguation) =

James Tyrrell (c. 1450–1502) was the alleged murderer of the Princes in the Tower.

James Tyrrell may also refer to:

- James Tyrrell (writer) (1642–1718), English author and political philosopher
- James Tyrrell (British Army officer) (c. 1674–1742), MP for Boroughbridge
- James Robert Tyrrell (1875–1961), Australian bookseller, art dealer, publisher and author
- James William Tyrrell, Canadian topologist and author
- James Tyrrell (Canadian football) (born 1996), Canadian gridiron football player
