= Donnie Ernsberger =

American football player (born 1996)

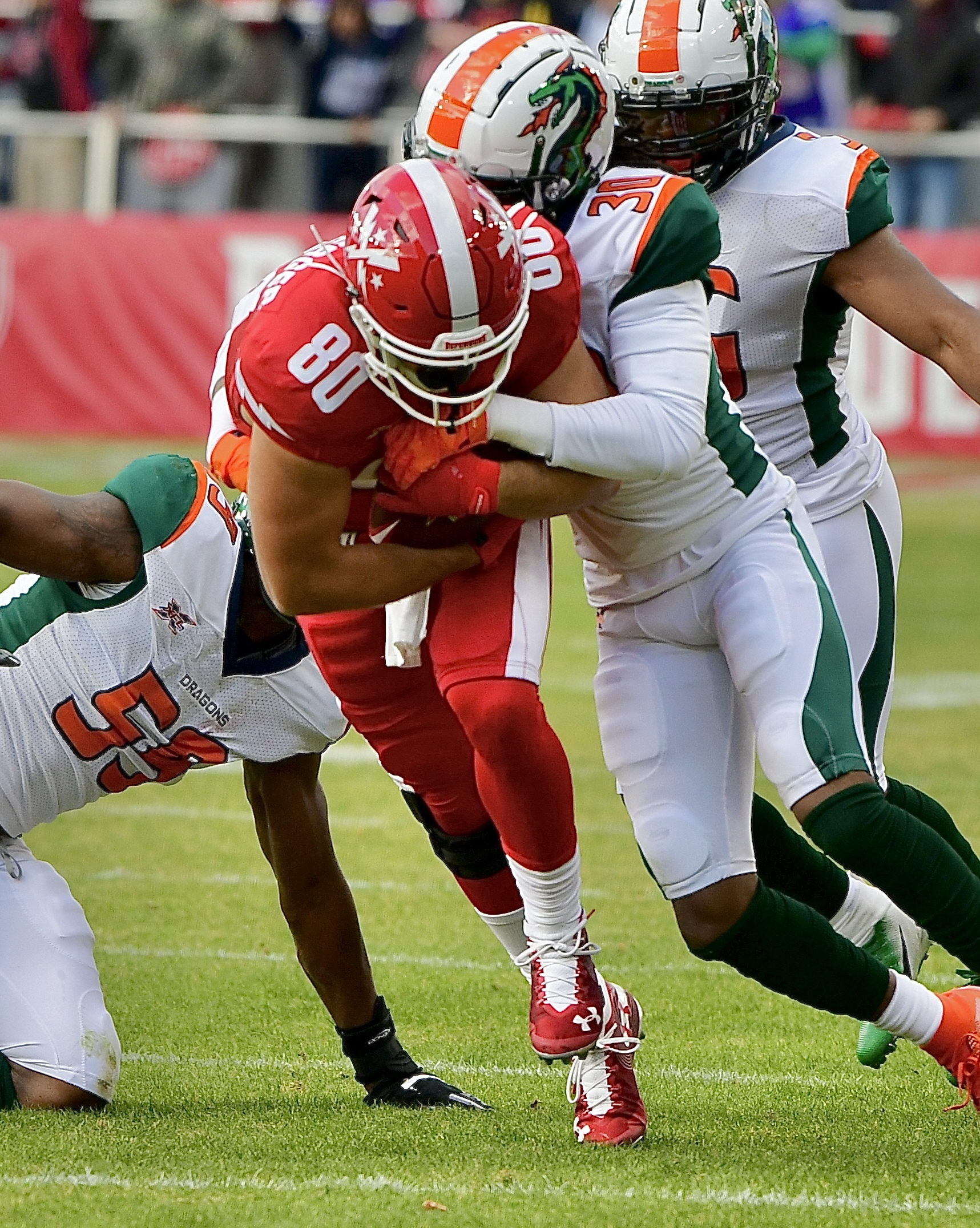
- Ernsberger with the DC Defenders in 2020

No. 86, 80
- Position: Tight end

Personal information
- Born: October 13, 1996 (age 30); Battle Creek, Michigan, U.S.
- Listed height: 6 ft 3 in (1.91 m)
- Listed weight: 241 lb (109 kg)

Career information
- High school: Lakeview High School (Battle Creek, Michigan)
- College: Western Michigan
- NFL draft: 2018: undrafted

Career history
- Tampa Bay Buccaneers (2018); Jacksonville Jaguars (2019)*; DC Defenders (2020); TSL Jousters (2021); Tennessee Titans (2021)*
- * Offseason or practice squad member only

Awards and highlights
- Second-team All-MAC (2017)
- Stats at Pro Football Reference

Donald "Donnie" Ernsberger (born October 13, 1996) is an American former football tight end. He played college football at Western Michigan.

== College career ==
Ernsberger played four seasons for the Western Michigan Broncos football team, playing both fullback and tight end. He was used primarily as a blocker in the Broncos offense his first three seasons and was named a third-team All-MAC selection as a junior. As a senior, Ernsberger caught 34 passes for 394 and four touchdowns and was named second-team All-MAC and participated in the NFLPA Collegiate Bowl.

== Professional career ==
=== Tampa Bay Buccaneers ===
Ernsberger signed with the Tampa Bay Buccaneers as an undrafted free agent on April 28, 2018. Ernsberger was ultimately waived by the team with an injury settlement during training camp. The Buccaneers later re-signed Ernsberger to their practice squad on November 28. He was promoted to the Buccaneers' active roster on December 18.

On July 31, 2019, Ernsberger was waived by the Buccaneers.

=== Jacksonville Jaguars ===
On August 1, 2019, Ernsberger was claimed off waivers by the Jacksonville Jaguars. He was waived by the Jaguars during final roster cuts on August 31.

=== DC Defenders ===
On November 22, 2019, Ernsberger was drafted by the DC Defenders in the 2020 XFL Supplemental Draft. He signed a contract with the league during mini-camp in December. Ernsberger had his contract terminated when the league suspended operations on April 10, 2020.

=== Tennessee Titans ===
On August 5, 2021, Ernsberger signed with the Tennessee Titans. On August 11, Ernsberger was waived/injured and placed on injured reserve, but was waived off injured reserve on August 14.
