= Sal Cannella (American football) =

American football player (born 1996)

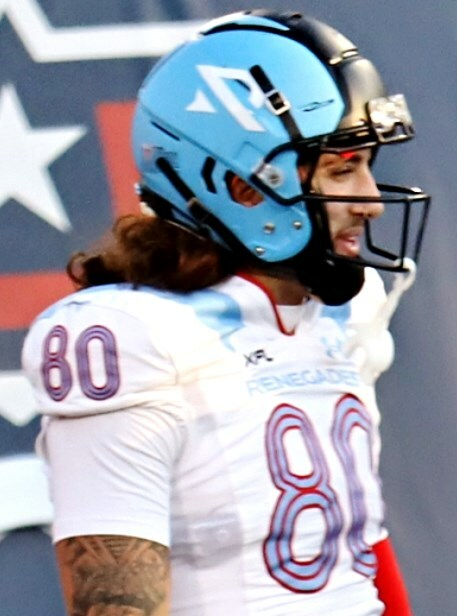
- Cannella with the Arlington Renegades in 2023

No. 80 – St. Louis Battlehawks
- Position: Tight end
- Roster status: Active

Personal information
- Born: December 2, 1996 (age 29); Schaumburg, Illinois, U.S.
- Listed height: 6 ft 4 in (1.93 m)
- Listed weight: 255 lb (116 kg)

Career information
- High school: St Viator (Arlington Heights, Illinois)
- College: Scottsdale CC (2016); Auburn (2017–2019)
- NFL draft: 2020: undrafted

Career history
- TSL Generals (2020–2021); Miami Dolphins (2021)*; New Orleans Breakers (2022); Green Bay Packers (2022)*; Arlington Renegades (2023); Seattle Seahawks (2023)*; Arlington Renegades (2024); Tampa Bay Buccaneers (2024)*; Arlington Renegades (2025); Cleveland Browns (2025); St. Louis Battlehawks (2026–present)
- * Offseason or practice squad member only

Awards and highlights
- All-UFL Team (2025); UFL receiving touchdowns leader (2024); XFL champion (2023); All-USFL Team (2022); TSL champion (2020)

Career NFL statistics as of 2025
- Receptions: 2
- Receiving yards: 11
- Stats at Pro Football Reference

Salvatore Cannella (born December 2, 1996) is an American professional football tight end for the St. Louis Battlehawks of the United Football League (UFL). He played college football for the Auburn Tigers. After going undrafted in the 2020 NFL draft, he played for the TSL Generals of The Spring League (TSL). He also played for the New Orleans Breakers of the United States Football League (USFL) and the Arlington Renegades of the United Football League (UFL). Cannella made his NFL regular season debut in 2025 with the Browns.

== Early life ==
Cannella was born in Schaumburg, Illinois, but grew up in Arlington Heights, Illinois. He reportedly did not play football his junior year at high school at St. Viator High School, in order to focus on basketball.

== College career ==
Cannella attended Scottsdale Community College where he hauled in 29 receptions for 443 yards and seven touchdowns over 10 games. On September 3, 2016, Cannella had a career high six catches for 100 yards and two touchdowns against Glendale Community College. In 2017, he transferred to Auburn University. His first touchdown with the Tigers came on a six-yard pass from Jarrett Stidham against No. 6 Washington on September 3, 2018. On January 1, 2020, in the Outback Bowl against Minnesota Cannella caught a 37-yard touchdown pass from Bo Nix. Cannella appeared in 37 games over three seasons for the Tigers and had 25 receptions for 330 yards and five touchdowns.

== Professional career ==
Pre-draft measurables
Height	Weight	Arm length	Hand span	Wingspan	40-yard dash	10-yard split	20-yard split	20-yard shuttle	Three-cone drill	Vertical jump	Broad jump	Bench press
6 ft 4 1/4 in (1.94 m)	242 lb (110 kg)	32 1/8 in (0.82 m)	9 3/8 in (0.24 m)	6 ft 4 1/2 in (1.94 m)	4.74 s	1.65 s	2.75 s	4.33 s	7.15 s	33.5 in (0.85 m)	9 ft 5 in (2.87 m)	20 reps
All values from Pro Day

Cannella was an undrafted free agent exiting the 2020 NFL draft, and did not sign with a team.

=== TSL Generals ===
Cannella played in the 2020 The Spring League Fall season for the TSL Generals. In 2020, Cannella had 12 receptions for 108 yards and two touchdowns in just three games. He also had an additional five catches for 66 yards and one touchdown in the championship game. He was a key part of the Generals championship winning team in 2020, and as a result earned a workout with the Indianapolis Colts. However, Cannella did not sign, and returned to the Generals for the 2021 The Spring League season. In 2021, Cannella caught eight passes for 97 yards. Following the season, he was invited to a mini-camp held by the Chicago Bears but did not sign.

=== Miami Dolphins ===
On August 2, 2021, Cannella signed with the Miami Dolphins, and spent four days on the roster before being cut.

=== New Orleans Breakers ===
Cannella was drafted number 2 overall in the tight end's phase of the 2022 USFL draft by the New Orleans Breakers. During the season, Cannella accumulated 34 receptions for 368 yards, with two touchdowns, and was named to the All-USFL Team.

=== Green Bay Packers ===
On July 20, 2022, the Green Bay Packers announced that they had signed Cannella. Cannella was cut by the team on August 16.

=== Arlington Renegades ===
Cannella was drafted 7th overall in the Skill Positions Phase of the 2023 XFL draft by the Arlington Renegades. He was the first tight end selected. During the regular season, Cannella was targeted 63 times and made 42 receptions for 415 yards. He was the Renegades' leading receiver, and was also second among receiving yards for tight ends, behind only Cody Latimer. Cannella later won the 2023 XFL Championship Game with the Renegades. He was released from his contract on August 21, 2023.

=== Seattle Seahawks ===
On August 21, 2023, Canella signed with the Seattle Seahawks. He was waived on August 27.

On October 10, 2023, the Minnesota Vikings hosted Cannella for a workout, but no deal was reached.

=== Arlington Renegades (second stint) ===
On February 25, 2024, Cannella re-signed with the Renegades. Cannella finished the season and led the league with a career-high six receiving touchdowns. He finished first among tight ends with 497 receiving yards and 53 catches.

=== Tampa Bay Buccaneers ===
Cannella signed with the Tampa Bay Buccaneers on July 25, 2024. He was waived on August 27.

=== Arlington Renegades ===
On February 25, 2025, Cannella re-signed with the Renegades. On June 2, Cannella was selected to the All-UFL Team.

=== Cleveland Browns ===
On June 19, 2025, Cannella signed with the Cleveland Browns of the National Football League. He was waived on August 24 and re-signed to the practice squad three days later. After spending the first 16 weeks of the season on the practice squad, Cannella was elevated to the active roster for the Browns' Week 17 game against the Pittsburgh Steelers and made his regular-season debut in that game, catching two passes for 11 yards.

Cannella signed a reserve/future contract with Cleveland on January 5, 2026. On May 9, Cannella was waived by the Browns.

=== St. Louis Battlehawks ===
On May 19, 2026, Cannella signed with the St. Louis Battlehawks.

== Career statistics ==
Legend
	Led the league
	League champion
**Bold**	Career high

=== Spring football ===
==== Regular season ====
Year	Team	League	Games		Receiving				
Year	Team	League	GP	GS	Rec	Yds	Avg	Lng	TD
2022	NO	USFL	**10**	9	34	368	**10.8**	39	2
2023	ARL	XFL	**10**	7	42	415	9.8	31	0
2024	ARL	UFL	**10**	6	**53**	**497**	9.4	**46**	**6**
2025	ARL	UFL	**10**	**10**	44	474	**10.8**	40	1
2026	STL	UFL	2	0	1	3	3.0	3	0
Career			44	32	176	1,768	10.0	46	9

==== Postseason ====
Year	Team	League	Games		Receiving				
Year	Team	League	GP	GS	Rec	Yds	Avg	Lng	TD
2022	NO	USFL	1	1	12	154	12.8	25	0
2023	ARL	XFL	2	1	6	89	14.8	41	1
2026	STL	UFL	1	0	4	34	8.5	12	0
Career			5	2	22	277	12.6	41	1

=== NFL ===
Year	Team	Games		Receiving				
Year	Team	GP	GS	Rec	Yds	Avg	Lng	TD
2025	CLE	2	0	2	11	5.5	6	0
Career		2	0	2	11	5.5	6	0

=== College ===
Year	Team	Games	Receiving			
Year	Team	GP	Rec	Yards	Avg	TD
2016	Scottsdale CC	10	29	443	15.2	7
2017	Auburn	11	3	31	10.3	0
2018	Auburn	13	12	111	9.2	3
2019	Auburn	13	10	188	18.8	2
Career		47	54	773	14.3	12
