= 2018 The Spring League season =

American football league

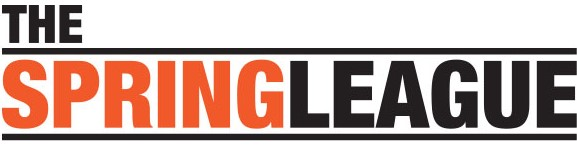
- League: The Spring League
- Sport: American football
- Duration: April 7 – 12
- Games: 2 per team
- Teams: 4
- TV partner: B/R Live
- Season champions: West
- Season MVP: Bryan Scott

Seasons
- 2017 2019

The 2018 The Spring League season was the second overall in league history, which was played in Round Rock, Texas.

On December 7, 2017, The Spring League announced it would play its second season in Austin, Texas beginning in late March 2018. The league was also to have a football-specific tech forum and a joint internship program with the University of Texas’ Center for Sports Leadership & Innovation. Turner Sports announced in mid-January 2018, while the league games would be on its new streaming service B/R Live, the league was also finalizing a deal to practice and play games at Circuit of the Americas near Austin, Texas. On March 3, the league did not execute on the contract to play the 2018 season at the Circuit of the Americas and instead announced events to take place at Kelly Reeves Athletic Complex in Round Rock.

== Players ==
The league had try-outs in various cities in October and November 2017 and February 2018.

On February 14, the league announced the signing of Heisman Trophy winner and former Cleveland Browns first round pick Johnny Manziel to the league playing on the South team. Games to be played on April 7 and 14. Other former NFL commitments to the league were former Cleveland Browns first round pick Kellen Winslow Jr. and former Baltimore Ravens running back Lorenzo Taliaferro.

== Coaches ==
The following coaches were part of the 2018 season:

- Bart Andrus (West)
- Steve Fairchild (North)
- Donnie Henderson (East)
- Terry Shea (South)

Robert Gordon was the Wide receivers coach.

== Games ==
Date	Team	score	opponent	score	Ref
April 7	North	13	West	30	
April 7	South	7	East	11	
April 12	South	17	West	34	
April 12	North	27	East	10	

== Standings ==
Spring League 2018
Team	W	L	PCT	PF	PA
West	2	0	1.000	64	30
North	1	1	.500	40	40
East	1	1	.500	21	34
South	0	2	.000	24	45

== Signees to professional leagues ==
The following players signed with NFL, CFL or AAF teams following their involvement with The Spring League in 2018:

- Roman Braglio, a defensive lineman, signed with the Hamilton Tiger-Cats on May 6.
- Defensive lineman Harold Brantley signed with the Ottawa Redblacks on May 18. Brantley was released following the preseason, and has yet to accept a practice roster spot with Ottawa.
- Running back Brandon Burks signed with the Toronto Argonauts on April 16. Burks was the first professional Spring League signing of 2018.
- Tight end Paul Butler received an invite to the Oakland Raiders rookie minicamp, and was promptly signed by the team on May 7.
- David Cobb, a running back, signed with the Saskatchewan Roughriders on June 4.
- Defensive lineman Breion Creer signed with the BC Lions on May 7.
- Offensive lineman Quinterrius Eatmon was signed by the Carolina Panthers on May 14.
- Defensive back Tyson Graham signed with the Atlanta Falcons on April 17.
- Marcus Henry, a center, was signed by the Seattle Seahawks on May 9, having been invited to participate in rookie minicamp with the team following The Spring League.
- Offensive lineman Cameron Hunt was signed by the Oakland Raiders on May 17.
- Defensive lineman/linebacker Kani Kema-Kaleiwahea signed with the BC Lions on April 17.
- Johnny Manziel, a quarterback, signed with the Hamilton Tiger-Cats on May 19.
- Defensive back Raysean Pringle signed with the Detroit Lions on April 18.
- Linebacker/Safety Keith Reineke was signed by the Calgary Stampeders on April 23.
- Tight End Beau Sandland signed with the Arizona Cardinals on April 17, reuniting him with Steve Wilks, his former coach from his stint with the Carolina Panthers.
- Karter Schult, a defensive end, signed with the Carolina Panthers on May 14, after participating in the Panthers minicamp.
- Taylor Symmank, a punter, was signed by the New York Giants on June 5.
- Running back Lorenzo Taliaferro was signed by the Hamilton Ti-Cats on May 28, but released on June 6.
- Defensive back Dwayne Thomas was signed by the Hamilton Ti-Cats on May 18, but released on June 11 following the CFL preseason.
- Defensive lineman/linebacker Lynden Trail signed with the Hamilton Ti-Cats on May 5.
- Zach Mettenberger (West team quarterback) was signed by the Alliance of American Football's Memphis team by July 30, 2018. Mettenberger was one of an estimated 40 players from The Spring League to have signed with the AAF.

== Spring League Showcases ==
Following the April games another "Summer Showcase" was announced for July 2018.

The Spring League announced a "Fall Showcase" for Miami, Florida to take place November 6–9, 2018, which the league intends to prepare players for the AAF and XFL, which play winter/spring seasons.
