= Cameron Jefferson =

American football player (born 1992)

No. 61
- Position: Offensive tackle

Personal information
- Born: May 2, 1992 (age 34); Cleveland, Ohio, U.S.
- Listed height: 6 ft 5 in (1.96 m)
- Listed weight: 317 lb (144 kg)

Career information
- High school: Desert Oasis (Enterprise, Nevada)
- College: UNLV (2011–2013); Arkansas (2014)
- NFL draft: 2015: undrafted

Career history
- Chicago Bears (2015)*; Denver Broncos (2015–2016)*; Buffalo Bills (2017)*; Washington Redskins (2017–2018)*; Saskatchewan Roughriders (2019–2021); TSL Conquerors (2020–2021)
- * Offseason or practice squad member only

Awards and highlights
- Super Bowl champion (50)
- Stats at Pro Football Reference

Cameron Jefferson (born May 2, 1992) is an American former professional football offensive tackle. He played college football for the UNLV Rebels and Arkansas Razorbacks. He was on the Denver Broncos' Super Bowl 50 championship team when they defeated the Carolina Panthers.

== Professional career ==
=== Chicago Bears ===
Jefferson signed with the Chicago Bears as an undrafted free agent on May 3, 2015. On August 30, 2015, he was waived by the Bears.

=== Denver Broncos ===
On December 8, 2015, Jefferson was signed to the Denver Broncos' practice squad.

On February 7, 2016, Jefferson was part of the Broncos team that won Super Bowl 50 over the Carolina Panthers by a score of 24–10.

On February 10, 2016, he signed a reserve/future contract with the Broncos. On August 29, 2016, Jefferson was waived by the Broncos.

=== Buffalo Bills ===
On April 7, 2017, Jefferson signed with the Buffalo Bills. He was waived on September 2, 2017.

=== Washington Redskins ===
On December 6, 2017, Jefferson was signed to the Washington Redskins' practice squad. He signed a reserve/future contract with the Redskins on January 1, 2018. On August 20, 2018, Jefferson was placed on injured reserve, later being waived with an injury settlement on August 24.

=== Saskatchewan Roughriders ===
Jefferson signed a practice roster contract with the Saskatchewan Roughriders of the Canadian Football League (CFL) on June 26, 2019. After the CFL canceled the 2020 season due to the COVID-19 pandemic, Jefferson chose to opt-out of his contract with the Roughriders on August 26, 2020. Jefferson signed with the Conquerors of The Spring League on October 17, 2020, and opted back in to his contract with the Roughriders on January 4, 2021. He was placed on the suspended list on May 20, 2021, to re-join the Conquerors. He was reinstated by the Roughriders on July 3.
