= Gabe Holmes =

American football player (born 1991)

No. 85
- Position: Tight end

Personal information
- Born: March 29, 1991 (age 35); Miramar, Florida, U.S.
- Listed height: 6 ft 5 in (1.96 m)
- Listed weight: 255 lb (116 kg)

Career information
- High school: Fort Lauderdale (FL) Aquinas
- College: Purdue
- NFL draft: 2015: undrafted

Career history
- Oakland Raiders (2015–2016); Seattle Seahawks (2017)*; Baltimore Ravens (2017)*; Arizona Cardinals (2017–2018); Indianapolis Colts (2019)*; Team 9 (2020)*; St. Louis BattleHawks (2020); TSL Alphas (2021); Miami Dolphins (2021)*; Tennessee Titans (2021)*
- * Offseason or practice squad member only
- Stats at Pro Football Reference

Gabrison Brig Holmes (born March 29, 1991) is an American former football tight end. He was originally signed by the Oakland Raiders as an undrafted free agent in 2015. He played college football at Purdue.

== Professional career ==
=== Oakland Raiders ===
After going undrafted in the 2015 NFL draft, Holmes signed with the Oakland Raiders on May 8, 2015. On September 15, 2015, he was waived by the Raiders and was re-signed to the practice squad. On November 13, Holmes was promoted to the active roster. On August 29, 2016, Holmes was placed on injured reserve after suffering an ankle injury in the preseason. On September 2, 2017, Holmes was waived by the Raiders.

=== Seattle Seahawks ===
On September 13, 2017, Holmes was signed to the Seattle Seahawks practice squad. He was released on September 26, 2017.

=== Baltimore Ravens ===
On October 3, 2017, Holmes was signed to the Baltimore Ravens' practice squad, He was released on October 24, 2017.

=== Arizona Cardinals ===
On November 30, 2017, Holmes was signed to the Arizona Cardinals' practice squad. He was promoted to the active roster on December 16, 2017. He was waived on October 30, 2018 and was re-signed to the practice squad the next day.

=== Indianapolis Colts ===
On January 19, 2019, Holmes signed a reserve/future contract with the Indianapolis Colts. On August 31, 2019, Holmes was waived by the Colts.

=== St. Louis BattleHawks ===
Holmes signed with the XFL's Team 9 practice squad during the regular season. He was signed off of Team 9 by the St. Louis BattleHawks on March 9, 2020. He had his contract terminated when the league suspended operations on April 10, 2020.

Holmes signed with the Alphas of The Spring League in May 2021.

=== Miami Dolphins ===
On August 3, 2021, Holmes signed with the Miami Dolphins, but waived two days later.

=== Tennessee Titans ===
Holmes was signed by the Tennessee Titans on August 11, 2021. He was waived on August 15.
