= Isaac Zico =

American football player (born 1996)

No. 88
- Position: Wide receiver

Personal information
- Born: June 18, 1996 (age 30)
- Listed height: 6 ft 1 in (1.85 m)
- Listed weight: 200 lb (91 kg)

Career information
- College: Georgia Military College (2015–2016); Purdue (2017–2018)
- NFL draft: 2019: undrafted

Career history
- Tennessee Titans (2019)*; Arizona Cardinals (2019)*; Toronto Argonauts (2020)*; TSL Lineman (2021); Louisville Xtreme (2021); Massachusetts Pirates (2021–2025)
- * Offseason or practice squad member only

Isaac Zico (born June 18, 1996) is an American professional football wide receiver. He played college football for the Florida Gators.

== College career ==
Zico played at Georgia Military College from 2015 to 2016. He transferred to Purdue in 2017 where he played for two years. Zico finished his collegiate career with 61 receptions for 1,242 yards and 19 touchdowns.

== Professional career ==
=== Tennessee Titans ===
After going undrafted in the 2019 NFL draft, Zico signed with the Tennessee Titans on April 27, 2019. He was released on May 13, 2019.

=== Arizona Cardinals ===
On August 2, 2019, Zico was signed by the Arizona Cardinals. He was released on August 31, 2019.

=== Toronto Argonauts ===
On December 20, 2019, Zico was signed by the Toronto Argonauts of the Canadian Football League (CFL). He was placed on the COVID-19 Opt-Out list in August 2020.

=== TSL Lineman ===
Zico played for the Lineman of The Spring League in 2021. They defeated the Jousters 26–23 to win the Mega Bowl where Zico caught two touchdown passes including the game winning 16 yard reception with 52 seconds remaining.

=== Massachusetts Pirates ===
The Massachusetts Pirates of the Indoor Football League (IFL) acquired Zico in 2021 after the team ceased operations. In 2022, Zico caught 38 receptions for 435 yards and 7 touchdowns.
