= James Tyrrell (Canadian football) =

Canadian gridiron football player (born 1996)

No. 83
- Position: Slotback

Personal information
- Born: January 10, 1996 (age 30); Montreal, Quebec, Canada
- Listed height: 6 ft 0 in (1.83 m)
- Listed weight: 193 lb (88 kg)

Career information
- High school: Holderness School (Holderness, New Hampshire)
- University: Concordia (2015–2019)
- CFL draft: 2019: undrafted

Career history
- Ottawa Redblacks (2020–2021)*; Winnipeg Blue Bombers (2021)
- * Offseason or practice squad member only

Awards and highlights
- Grey Cup champion (2021); First-team All-Canadian (2019); First-team RSEQ All-Star (2019)

Career CFL statistics
- Games played: 9
- Stats at CFL.ca

James Tyrrell (born January 10, 1996) is a Canadian former professional football slotback who played in the Canadian Football League (CFL) for the Ottawa Redblacks and Winnipeg Blue Bombers. He played U Sports football for the Concordia Stingers.

== Early life ==
Tyrrell was born on January 10, 1996, in Montreal, Quebec, Canada. He attended Holderness School in Holderness, New Hampshire.

== University career ==
Tyrrell played U Sports football for the Concordia Stingers from 2015 to 2019. As a senior, he had 52 receptions for 779 yards and two touchdowns, earning first-team All-Canadian and RSEQ All-Star honors.

== Professional career ==
=== Ottawa Redblacks ===
On December 4, 2019, Tyrrell was signed by the Ottawa Redblacks. However, after the 2020 CFL season was cancelled, he was released by the team on January 11, 2021, without playing a down.

=== The Spring League ===
In 2021, Tyrrell signed with the Sea Lions of The Spring League (TSL). He appeared in 6 games and had one touchdown on special teams.

=== Winnipeg Blue Bombers ===
On June 18, 2021, the Winnipeg Blue Bombers signed Tyrrell. He played in nine games as a reserve slotback before he was released on November 1. On November 25, Tyrrell was signed to the practice roster where he stayed for the remainder of the season as the Blue Bombers won the 108th Grey Cup. He became a free agent at the end of the season.
