= 2019 The Spring League season =

American football league

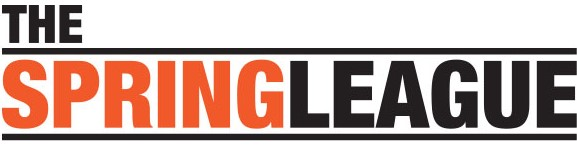
- League: The Spring League
- Sport: American football
- Duration: April 6 – 11
- Games: 2 per team
- Teams: 4
- TV partner: None
- Season champions: Austin Generals

Seasons
- 2018 2020

The 2019 The Spring League season (or TSL Austin) was the third overall in league history, which was played in Austin, Texas. 2019 season practice began March 31, 2019, with double headers on April 6 and 11, 2019. Each of the four teams played two games.

The League partnered with the XFL to test potential rule adjustments, experiment with potential in-game technologies and scout talent as the league prepared for its inaugural season. The XFL paid the league "six figures" for its services, a payment that allowed The Spring League to turn a profit that year for the first time.

== Rules ==
The Spring League partnered with the XFL to test rule changes the new league hoped to implement for its own 2020 season. One rule change, originally proposed by Pro Football Talk in 2017, was replacing overtime with a two-point conversion shootout occurring simultaneously at both end zones with five rounds in the TSL. Also tested was the tap rule, which allows a referee to send a player to the sideline for less than a penalty level offense. Both rules and the kickoff formation were later implemented in the XFL.

== Teams ==
For the first time, one of the teams had a brand name; the Austin Generals (formerly South) was named after its host city of Austin, and used the logo and colors of the former New Jersey Generals of the United States Football League. The remaining three teams retained their generic North, East and West brandings.

The following coaches were part of the 2019 season:

- Bart Andrus (Austin)
- Marcel Bellefeuille (West)
- Don Wnek (North)
- Terry Shea (East)

Lynn Stiles was first announced as the North head coach, but did not appear on the league final roster.

== Games ==
Date	Team	score	opponent	score	Notes	Refs
April 6	North	6	West	36		
April 7	Generals	13	East	6	Overtime Test Game	
April 13	North	31	East	24		
April 15	Generals	32	West	13		

== Standings ==
Spring League 2019
Team	W	L	PCT	PF	PA
Austin Generals	2	0	1.000	45	19
West	1	1	.500	49	38
North	1	1	.500	37	60
East	0	2	.000	30	44

== XFL tryouts ==
The Spring League was hired by the XFL to hold three mini-camp style tryouts. With this revenue source, the league's revenue exceeded one million dollars and would have its first profitable year. The two leagues are in preliminary discussions of the Spring League becoming the XFL's official development league.

== Spring League Showcases ==
The league held its two "Summer Showcases" in partnership with the XFL - the first on June in Mission Viejo, California and the second on July 30 in Long Beach, California, 2019 with 100 pay to play players in a four-day camp and a six quarter scrimmage. XFL executives and coaches and ESPN and Fox staff were on had to view rule tests and in-game technologies with the broadcaster giving feedback on how it would effect broadcast coverage.

A "Fall Showcase" was held on September in Marietta, Georgia, and on November they held another showcase in Miami, Florida.
