= Ryan Willis =

American football player (born 1996)

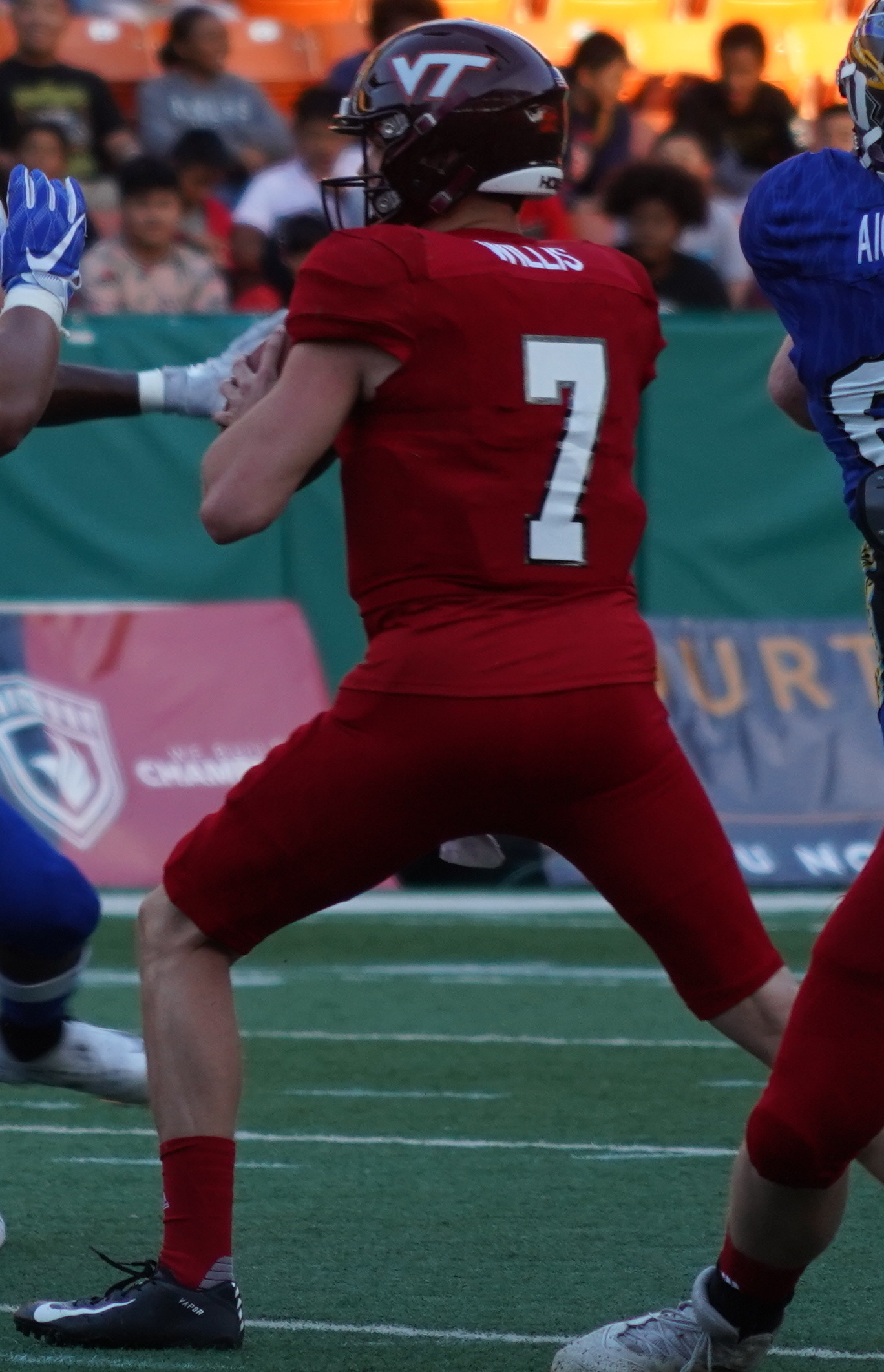
- Willis at the 2020 Hula Bowl

No. 7, 10, 13, 14
- Position: Quarterback

Personal information
- Born: September 28, 1996 (age 30); Overland Park, Kansas, U.S.
- Listed height: 6 ft 4 in (1.93 m)
- Listed weight: 211 lb (96 kg)

Career information
- High school: Bishop Miege (Roeland Park, Kansas)
- College: Kansas (2015–2016); Virginia Tech (2017–2019)
- NFL draft: 2020: undrafted

Career history
- Chicago Bears (2021); St. Louis BattleHawks (2023)*; Memphis Showboats (2023)
- * Offseason or practice squad member only
- Stats at Pro Football Reference

Ryan Willis (born September 28, 1996) is an American former professional football quarterback. He played college football for the Virginia Tech Hokies.

== Early life and college ==
Willis came out of high school as a three-star prospect, as rated by Rivals.com. He chose to play for Kansas over Wyoming, Illinois, Kansas State, and Tulsa. In his first start at Kansas, a Big 12 conference game versus the Baylor Bears, Willis broke his career high in passing, throwing 158 yards, on 20 completions and 36 attempts, and one touchdown. In a near win versus the 15th ranked TCU Horned Frogs, Willis threw 20–41 passes for 203 yards and a touchdown. He started the final 8 games of the season for the Jayhawks in 2015, completing 165 of 315 passes for 1,719 yards, 8 touchdowns and 10 interceptions.

He played in seven games, starting two, in 2016, completing 72 of 117 yards for 811 yards, 3 touchdowns and 7 interceptions.

In January 2017, it was announced that Willis was transferring to play for the Virginia Tech Hokies. At Virginia Tech, Willis joined the team as a walk-on with no guarantee that he would make the team; but he did and spent the 2017 season sitting out due to NCAA transfer rules.

In 2018, Willis has appeared in two games and made his first start at Virginia Tech at #22 Duke in Durham after an injury to incumbent starter Josh Jackson. Virginia Tech won the game 31–14, and Willis was 17-of-27 for 332 yards and three touchdown passes.

== Professional career ==
Pre-draft measurables
Height	Weight	Arm length	Hand span
6 ft 4 in (1.93 m)	225 lb (102 kg)	32 3/4 in (0.83 m)	9 1/2 in (0.24 m)
All values from Pro Day

=== The Spring League ===
Willis signed with the Linemen of The Spring League in May 2021. He was the MVP for The Spring League Mega Bowl in 2021 playing for the championship team. Willis would as well win The Spring League MVP the same season.

=== Chicago Bears ===
On December 18, 2021, Willis was signed to the Chicago Bears' practice squad. On December 25, he was "flexed" to the Bears' active roster to back up starter Nick Foles against the Seattle Seahawks.

Willis signed a reserve/future contract with the Bears on January 11, 2022. He was released by the team on May 11.

=== St. Louis BattleHawks ===
On September 29, 2022, XFL Reporter Mike Mitchell reported that eight quarterbacks that worked with Jordan Palmer have reportedly signed with each team. Willis signed with the St. Louis BattleHawks.

=== Memphis Showboats ===
On February 8, 2023, Willis signed with the Memphis Showboats of the United States Football League (USFL). He was released on January 26, 2024.
