= Larry Kirksey =

American football coach (born 1951)

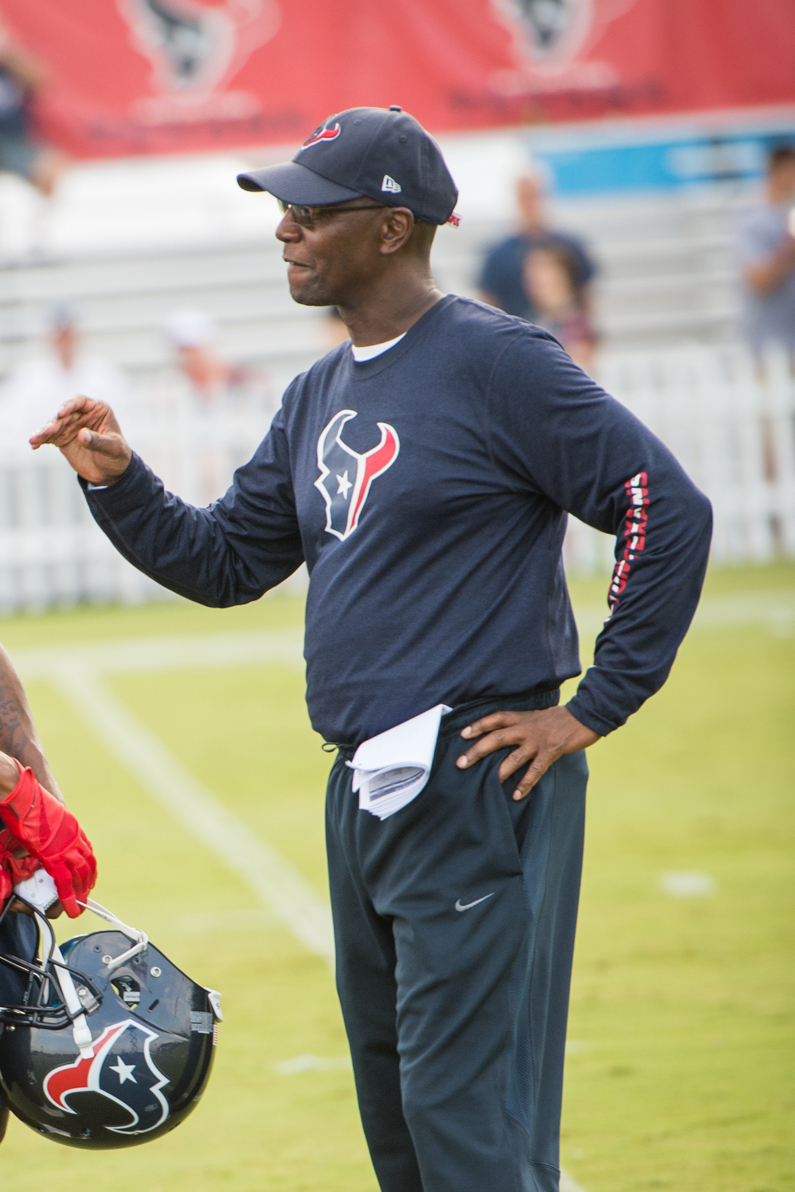

Personal information
- Born: January 6, 1951 (age 75); Harlan, Kentucky, U.S.

Career information
- College: Eastern Kentucky

Career history
- Miami (OH) (1974–1976) Quarterbacks/Wide receivers/Tight ends coach; Kentucky (1977–-1981) Wide receivers & tight ends coach; Kansas (1982) Wide receivers & tight ends coach; Kentucky State (1983) Head coach; Florida (1984–1988) Running backs coach; Pittsburgh (1989) Running backs coach; Alabama (1990–1993) Running backs coach; San Francisco 49ers (1994–1999) Wide receivers coach; Texas A&M (2000) Assistant head coach & wide receivers coach; Detroit Lions (2001–2002) Wide receivers coach; Jacksonville Jaguars (2003) Wide receivers coach; Denver Broncos (2004) Assistant special teams coach; Middle Tennessee (2006) Assistant head coach & Running backs coach; Houston Texans (2007–2013) Wide receivers coach; Seattle Dragons (2020) Wide receivers coach; Birmingham Stallions (2022–2023) Running backs coach

Awards and highlights
- Super Bowl champion (XXIX); 2× USFL champion (2022, 2023)

Head coaching record
- Regular season: 2–7–2 (.273)

Larry Kirksey (born January 6, 1951) is an American former football coach. He has 17 years' experience coaching in the NFL and an additional 22 years of coaching experience in the college ranks.

== Coaching career ==
=== Miami (Ohio) ===
Kirksey got his start in coaching as the wide receivers/tight ends coach at Miami (Ohio) in 1974, and remained there for three seasons.

=== University of Kentucky ===
Kirksey coached wide receivers and tight ends for the Wildcats from 1977 to 1981.

=== Kansas University ===
He spent the 1982 season coaching wide receivers and tight ends for the Jayhawks.

=== Kentucky State University ===
Kirksey was the 18th head football coach for the Kentucky State University Thorobreds located in Frankfort, Kentucky and he held that position for the 1983 season. His career coaching record at Kentucky State was 2 wins, 7 losses, and 2 ties (.273).

=== University of Florida ===
He coached running backs at the University of Florida under Charlie Pell and Galen Hall from 1984 to 1988. During his tenure at Florida, he coached star running backs Lorenzo Hampton, Neal Anderson, John L. Williams and Emmitt Smith.

=== University of Pittsburgh ===
After leaving Florida, Kirksey spent one year as running backs coach at Pittsburgh.

=== University of Alabama ===
From 1990 to 1993, Kirksey coached running backs for Alabama, where he helped lead the Crimson Tide to a national championship in 1992. Kirksey's running backs led the SEC with 252 rushing yards per game.

=== San Francisco 49ers ===
In 1994, Kirksey began his NFL career coaching the NFL's all-time reception and receiving yards leader, Jerry Rice. Under Kirksey, Rice set a then-NFL record with 1,848 receiving yards and had a career-high 122 receptions in 1995. From 1994 to 1999, Rice caught 606 passes for 6,666 yards. Kirksey's receivers helped set a Super Bowl record in Super Bowl XXIX with six touchdown catches, including three by Rice.

=== Detroit Lions ===
From 2001 to 2002, Kirksey coached wide receivers for the Detroit Lions, where wide receiver Johnnie Morton had his best season during his NFL career: 77 catches, 1,154 yards and four touchdowns.

=== Jacksonville Jaguars ===
Kirksey spent 2003 as the wide receivers coach with the Jacksonville Jaguars, where Jimmy Smith led the team with 54 receptions despite missing four games.

=== Middle Tennessee State ===
Kirksey helped lead Middle Tennessee State to the 2006 Sun Belt Conference title and a Motor City Bowl berth as the assistant head coach and running backs coach for the Blue Raiders in 2005.

=== Houston Texans ===
Kirksey was most recently the wide receivers coach for the Houston Texans. In seven seasons under Kirksey's tutelage, Andre Johnson averaged an NFL-best 93.6 yards per game, led the league in receiving yards in 2008 and 2009, and led the NFL in receptions in 2008. Johnson joined Jerry Rice as the only receivers in NFL history to lead the league in receiving yards in consecutive seasons and joined Marvin Harrison as the only receivers to surpass 1,500 yards in back-to-back years.

=== Seattle Dragons ===
In 2019, Kirksey joined the Seattle Dragons of the XFL as receivers coach.

=== The Spring League ===
Kirksey coached the Sea Lions of The Spring League in 2021.

== Personal life ==
Kirksey earned a bachelor's degree from Eastern Kentucky in 1974, where he was a four-year letterman and three-year starter at wide receiver. As a senior, he earned all-conference honors. He was out of coaching in 2005 while serving as deputy executive director of the Kentucky Sports Authority. He and wife Anita have two children, Jessica and Jared.
