= 2020 The Spring League season =

American football league

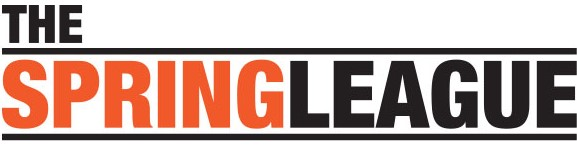
- League: The Spring League
- Sport: American football
- Duration: March 7 – 11
- Games: ~~6 (planned)~~ 5 (actual)
- Teams: 3
- TV partner: None / Eleven Sports (Japan showcase only)
- Season champions: Las Vegas Hughes

Seasons
- 2019 Fall 2020

The 2020 The Spring League season (or TSL Las Vegas) was the fourth overall in league history, which was played in Las Vegas. The league was able to get most of its abbreviated 2020 season completed just before social distancing mandates tied to the COVID-19 pandemic in the United States took effect, shutting down effectively all in-person sports in the United States. The main competition was played at Sam Boyd Stadium between March 7 to 11.

For 2020, TSL also played a showcase game against the Japan national American football team at the Ford Center at The Star March 1. The team was coached by Terry Shea (HC), Keith Rowen (OL), Samie Parker (WR) and Kevin Smith (DB).

== Teams and Players ==
The designated home team (formerly West) was dubbed the Las Vegas Hughes, named after Howard Hughes, who spent much of the end of his life as a recluse in Las Vegas, while the Austin Generals were slated for return but were scrapped before the season started, and the league fielded only three teams. Zach Mettenberger agreed to return as a quarterback. The registration fee for The Spring League's March 2020 season in Las Vegas were $2,100. According to the league Baltimore Ravens and Dallas Cowboys scouts were in attendance.

After the season the coaches selected a list of players that "made the strongest impression":
Quarterbacks - Zach Mettenberger, Devlin Isadore, James Tabary, Ian Fieber
Running backs - Aaron Forbes, Sola Olateju, Lavance Taylor, Bri'onte Dunn, Algie Brown, Matt Tuleja
Wide receivers - Quinn McElfresh, Kyle Castilleja, Garry Brown, Tevin Isom, Isiah Hennie, Charlie Jones, Clinton Greenway III, Zacchaeus Drew-Toles, Maurion Raines, Emmanuel Harris
Tight ends - Darrion Hutcherson, Cole Conrad, Austin Appleby, Andrew Reinkemeyer
Offensive line - Jeremiah Poutasi, Chris Gomez, Joseph Park
Defensive line - Brandon Hester, Jay Fanaika, Owen Obasuyi
Linebackers - Andrew Spencer, Kelechukwu Iweh, Tigi Hill, Marcus Porter, Paul Dawson
Defensive back - Daniel Harris, Oddie Harris, Trenton Trammell, Benjamin Hunt, J.J. Nunes, Brandon Arnold
Special teams - Tatsuya Shigenaga (LS), Clark Riedel (P), Edward Groth (K)

== Games ==
Rosters

Date	Team	score	opponent	score	Notes	Ref
March 7	Las Vegas	14	North	7		
March 7	North	14	East	7		
March 7	Las Vegas	3	East	0		
March 11	Las Vegas	17	East	6		
March 11	Las Vegas	0	North	7		
March 11	North	-	East	-	Cancelled	

== Standings ==
Spring League 2020
Team	W	L	PCT	PF	PA
Las Vegas Hughes	3	1	.750	34	20
North	2	1	.666	28	21
East	0	3	.000	13	34

== Summer Showcase ==
The league held its annual Summer Showcase on July in Glendale, Colorado, with a total of 85 players and another 25 staff members and medical personnel participated. Because of the COVID-19 pandemic all players had to go through 14-day self-quarantine before camp and all meetings were conducted in a video conference.
