= Stephen Austin (American football) =

American football executive

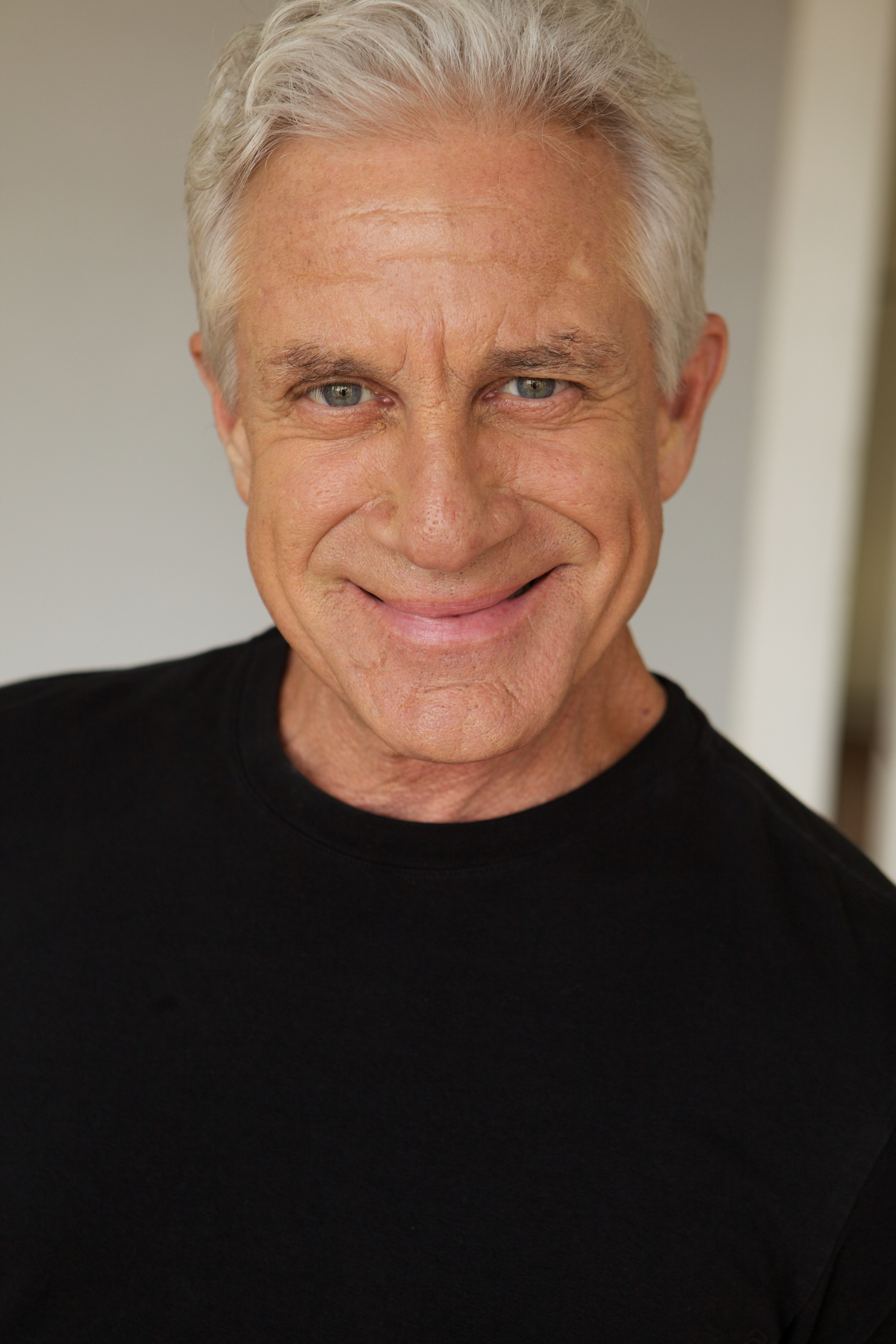
- Born: Summit, New Jersey
- Education: University of Cincinnati
- Occupations: Executive Producer, UnDrafted; Former Director, NFL Combine Properties Inc. Founder, ELITE Football Services Inc. President, Neurologics Sports Division

Stephen Austin is a former NFL executive and founder of the NFL Regional Combines and NFL Super Regional Combine.

== Business career ==
=== Early career ===
Austin first worked as a sports agent in 1981, primarily representing players in the USFL. In 1983, at the behest of the USFL Gunslingers Head Coach, Gil Steinke, Austin conducted his first pro tryout for "street" free agents at Gallaudet University in Washington, DC. After the USFL folded in 1984, Austin began representing several notable NFL players including Tampa Bay Buccaneers Pro Bowler, Wayne Haddix, and NY Jets punter Joe Prokop. During this time Austin began evaluating his own clients in order to more accurately gauge their NFL potential. Other agents became aware of Austin's workout sessions and began sending their clients for evaluation.

=== ELITE Pro Football Combines ===
In 1989, Austin founded Scout Camp, later changed to Elite National Combines. The first combine was held at Mt. San Antonio College in Pomona, CA. ELITE was officially endorsed by the Canadian Football League, Arena Football League, XFL, NFL Europe, and the American Football Coaches Association. ELITE was the first combine to offer players and pro teams streaming internet video in 1996, followed by a multi-criteria searchable player database. ELITE discovered notable NFL players such as Wayne Chrebet and Super Bowl champions Mike Flynn, Nick Harper, Bryan Braman, Adam Theilen and Adam Vinatieri.

=== National Athletic Testing System ===
In 2000, Austin created the National Athletic Testing System (NATS). NATS was a series of football evaluation camps for high school football players hoping to play college football. NATS camps were conducted by state high school football and athletic associations. The camps also included clinics to help participating players prepare for the Scholastic Aptitude Test. In 2005, NATS received a 1.4 million dollar grant from the National Football League Youth Football Fund and the NFL Players Association. As an additional NATS service, Austin created the Core Course Calculator (CCC) which was the first such web-based software design to help student athletes keep track of their NCAA core course requirements. Austin served as NATS President from 2000 to 2008 and, alongside former Notre Dame University head football coach Tyrone Willingham, vice-chairman from 2005 to 2008.

=== National Football League ===
In 2010, Austin sold ELITE Pro Football Combines to the National Football League. Elite Football remains the first and only company ever purchased by the National Football League. Austin served as Director of NFL Regional Combines and the NFL Super Regional Combine from 2010 to 2014. Between 1989 and 2014, Austin's Scout Camp, Elite and NFL Regional Combines have conducted over 300 pro football combines - the most in pro football history.

=== Entertainment career ===
From 2004 to 2006, Austin worked as a paid consultant to King World Productions where he assisted Vice President of Program Development, Mike Stornello, in the development of sports related broadcast content.

Currently, Austin is co-creator, producer and lead talent (season one) on the NFL Network hit show “UnDrafted,”. UnDrafted was nominated for an Emmy in its first season (2014) and its third season (2016). UnDrafted is the highest rated show in NFL Network history (excluding game broadcasts).

Austin is also creator of the show, "UnStoppable", which follows the lives of several young high school football players from struggling families who have been overlooked by the Division 1 football programs and have one last chance to earn an athletic scholarship and be the first in their family to attend college. UnStoppable is an Austin Media Group production now in development with Blue Pacific Studios. His show, "Champs", also an Austin Media Group production, is in development with Indigenous Films.

=== Austin Media Group, LLC ===
Austin founded Austin Media Group (AMG) in 2016. AMG creates, develops and produces unscripted and scripted content for television, film and OTT platforms.

=== Pro Day USA ===
In 2012 Austin designed a measuring device, known as the Jump Machine. The Jump Machine measures the long jumps and triple jumps in less than ten seconds and eliminates the tape measure with a laser beam. Jump Machines are now manufactured and distributed by Austin owned, Pro Day USA. The Jump Machine received a US patent February 28, 2017. Patent No.: US 9,579,556,B2

=== Alliance of American Football and the XFL ===
In 2018, AMG was retained by Bill Polian and Charlie Ebersol to direct the new Alliance of American Football league's regional combines. In 2019, AMG was tapped by the XFL to conduct the league’s Summer Showcase combines.

In 2019, AMG was tapped by XFL Commissioner, Oliver Luck to conduct the league’s Summer Showcase combines. Austin directed eight Showcases in each of the league’s eight team locations in June and the second week of July, 2019.
