= Donnie Henderson =

American football coach (born 1957)

Profile
- Position: Defensive coordinator

Personal information
- Born: May 17, 1957 (age 69); Baltimore, Maryland, U.S.

Career information
- College: Utah State

Career history
- Utah State (1983–1985) Graduate assistant; Utah State (1986–1988) Linebackers coach; Idaho (1989) Recruiting coordinator; California (1990–1991) Linebackers coach; Arizona State (1992–1994) Safeties coach; Arizona State (1995–1997) Defensive backs coach; Houston (1998) Defensive backs coach; Baltimore Ravens (1999) Assistant defensive backs coach; Baltimore Ravens (2000–2003) Defensive backs coach; New York Jets (2004–2005) Defensive coordinator; Detroit Lions (2006) Defensive coordinator; Jacksonville Jaguars (2008) Defensive backs coach; Arizona Cardinals (2010) Defensive backs coach; Southern (2011) Defensive backs coach; Syracuse (2012) Defensive backs coach; Buffalo Bills (2013–2015) Defensive backs coach; Salt Lake Stallions (2019) Defensive coordinator; Arizona State (2021) Interim defensive backs coach; Arizona State (2022) Defensive coordinator

Awards and highlights
- Super Bowl champion (XXXV)
- Coaching profile at Pro Football Reference

Donnie Henderson (born May 17, 1957) is an American football coach. He most recently was the defensive coordinator at Arizona State, and before that he was defensive coordinator of the Salt Lake Stallions of the Alliance of American Football (AAF).

== Biography ==
Henderson first joined the Jets during the 2004 NFL season. In 2005, the Jets had a second-ranked defense against the pass, but a 32nd-ranked defense against the run, which undoubtedly was one of the factors leading to the team's disappointing 4–12 record (in addition to Chad Pennington and Curtis Martin being absent for most of the season due to injury). Henderson was not kept on after head coach Herman Edwards was replaced by Eric Mangini following the season.

Henderson soon accepted the defensive coordinator position for the Detroit Lions and new head coach, Rod Marinelli. The Lions went 3–13 in 2006 and finished the season ranked 27th out of 32 in total defense. Henderson was fired from his position on January 2, 2007.

In 2010, he was hired by the Arizona Cardinals as a defensive backs coach.

Henderson coached at Southern University in 2011 and was named the defensive backs coach at Syracuse University in 2012. He was hired by the Buffalo Bills in 2013 to coach the defensive backs. He was a coach in The Spring League in 2017 and 2018.

In October 2018, he was announced as the defensive coordinator for the Salt Lake Stallions of the Alliance of American Football.

During the 2021 season, Henderson filled in at Arizona State as the interim defensive backs coach, and then following the season, he was promoted to defensive coordinator.
