= 2020 The Spring League Fall season =

American football league

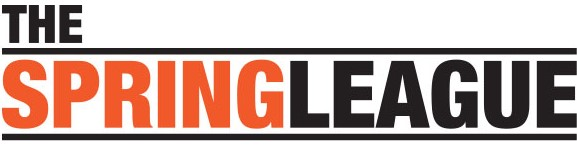
- League: The Spring League
- Sport: American football
- Duration: Regular season: October 27 – December 2 (planned); October 27 – December 15 (actual)
- Games: Regular season: 4 per team (planned); 3 per team (actual)
- Teams: 6
- TV partner: FS1
- Season champions: Generals
- Season MVP: Bryan Scott (Generals)
- Finals champions: Generals
- Runners-up: Aviators
- Finals MVP: Bryan Scott (Generals)

Seasons
- Spring 2020 Spring 2021

The 2020 The Spring League Fall season was the first Fall season, and the fifth overall in league history, which was played in San Antonio, Texas. Due to the COVID-19 pandemic the league conducted the season in a Bio-secure bubble.

The Spring League (TSL) began its fall season on Oct 27 with six teams competing in a 12-game format over four weeks in a bubble environment, based out of the San Antonio Alamodome. The concept was first conceived as a partnership with Canadian Football League (CFL) for proposed September return in abbreviated season. Fox Sports 1 aired games on Tuesday and Wednesday.

The league stated that this time the players did not pay to attend, but Spring League CEO Brian Woods later explained that some players did pay, while select others did not.

In November 2020, amid the COVID-19 pandemic, TSL announced that the league would be cancelling the final week of the season. The top two teams met in the final on December 15, at the Camping World Stadium in Orlando, Florida. The Generals beat the Aviators 37–14, and won the first TSL championship.

== Teams ==
All six teams had brands and names, including the returning Generals (originally from Austin), Aviators (re-branded from Las Vegas Hughes), and four new teams the Blues (modified from the FXFL Blacktips), Alphas (a wolf motif), Conquerors and Jousters.

Team	Colors	Original location	First year	Head coach
Alphas		N/A	2020	Steve Fairchild
Aviators		Las Vegas	2020 (Spring)	Terry Shea
Conquerors		N/A	2020	Jerry Glanville
Blues		N/A	2020	Ted Cottrell
Generals		Austin	2019	Bart Andrus
Jousters		N/A	2020	Chuck Bresnahan

== Coaches ==
All of the league teams were coached by coaches with vast experience in college or minor leagues and all, except Chuck Bresnahan, had head coaching experience, while all apart from Steve Fairchild were involved in the United Football League during its four-year existence:

- Steve Fairchild* (Alphas)
- Terry Shea* (Aviators)
- Ted Cottrell (Blues)
- Jerry Glanville (Conquerors)
- Bart Andrus* (Generals)
- Chuck Bresnahan (Jousters)

^{*} Returning coach from previous seasons

Some of the more recognizable assistants were June Jones (Conquerors) who was later replaced by Kevin Gilbride, Mike Singletary and Jeff Reinbold (Generals), Art Valero and Drew Tate (Alphas), Robert Ford (Jousters) and Eric Hicks (Aviators).

== Players ==
With the cancellation of the XFL 2021 season and the CFL not playing in 2020, the Spring League featured more recognizable names from years past. Some of the bigger names were NFL veteran QB Zach Mettenberger (Generals), the CFL's 2019 passing touchdowns leader McLeod Bethel-Thompson (Aviators), former Ohio State Buckeyes QB J. T. Barrett (Alphas) and 2018 TSL MVP Bryan Scott (Generals). After the second week the Conquerors added 2020 NFL draft pick and former Hawaii QB Cole McDonald, while former North Texas QB Devlin Isadore was the first TSL to be traded when he joined Aviators after playing for the Alphas. The league also featured players from smaller schools that didn't get an NFL opportunity after the NFL draft with the cancellation of the preseason and mini-camps.

== Games ==
Week	Date	Team	Score	Opponent	Score	Site	Notes	TV	Refs	Stats
Week 1	October 27	Alphas	0	Blues	19	Alamodome				
Week 1	October 27	Aviators	28	Jousters	0	Alamodome				
Week 1	October 27	Conquerors	19	Generals	33	Alamodome		FS1		
Week 2	November 4	Blues	17	Aviators	23*	Alamodome		FS1		
Week 2	November 4	Alphas	22	Conquerors	17	Alamodome		FS1		
Week 2	November 5	Generals	18	Jousters	15	Alamodome				
Week 3	November 10	Conquerors	42	Aviators	19	Alamodome	Originally scheduled for November 11	FS1		
Week 3	November 11	Jousters	0	Alphas	2	Alamodome	Forfeited (Originally scheduled for November 10 broadcast on FS1)			
Week 3	November 11	Blues	28	Generals	42	Alamodome		FS1		
Week 4	November 17	Jousters	-	Conquerors	-	Bob Benson '66' Stadium	Cancelled			
Week 4	November 17	Alphas	-	Blues	-	Bob Benson '66' Stadium	Cancelled	FS1		
Week 4	November 17	Aviators	-	Generals	-	Bob Benson '66' Stadium	Cancelled	FS1		
Final	December 15	Generals	37	Aviators	14	Camping World Stadium	Championship Game	FS1		

^{*} Overtime

== Standings ==
Spring League Fall 2020
Team	W	L	PCT	PF	PA
Generals	3	0	1.000	93	62
Aviators	2	1	.666	70	59
Alphas	2	1	.666	22	36
Conquerors	1	2	.500	78	74
Blues	1	2	.333	64	65
Jousters	0	3	.000	15	46

== Controversy ==
Before the week 3 games, rumors started to arise that the coaches discussed boycotting after not getting paid for their work, and agents of players had also come forward with allegations that in the past the Spring League failed to cover lodging costs as promised. The league's CEO Brian Woods would later argue that "the payroll system had to verify checking accounts before issuing the direct deposits, which delayed the payments".

After week 3, Bresnahan stepped down as head coach of the Jousters because of a miscommunication with the league resulting from an outbreak of COVID-19 in the team. The Jousters had several unspecified players test positive, resulting in a forfeited game against the Alphas, and cancellation of the scheduled broadcast. Offensive assistant Robert Ford was supposed to take over the head-coach duties, but as some of the other coaches had to leave as they were considered at high-risk, the Jousters final game was cancelled, making them the only team whose games were not broadcast.

Before week 4, Jousters player Cory Johnson released a YouTube video accusing Woods (referred to as "the league owner") of mistreating Johnson's teammates (no insurance for players, no trainers on staff, and no guarantee that players who had paid to be there get a fair look), disregarding COVID-19 protocols and threatening to prevent them from getting use of or access to personal game film. Other players complained of poor meals and having to pay for treatment, parking and hotel rooms. Furthermore, according to several players accounts, they paid to play in the league but instead just participate in three-day "showcase" and were sent home. Following these reports, the league announced that the remaining scheduled games were to be cancelled due to new positive COVID-19 test results and all players were sent home immediately.

Brian Woods later rejected most complaints and said that the players did not stay at the hotel and are responsible for the COVID-19 outbreak. He stated that the sick players had an option to stay at the hotel if they wanted to. Woods stated he planned to go ahead with the Championship Game on a later date.

== Signees to professional leagues ==
After the TSL season some of the players signed or received opportunities with National Football League (NFL) and Canadian Football League (CFL) teams. Additionally, all participating players were invited to Fan Controlled Football tryouts for free.

=== NFL ===
Player	Position	TSL team	NFL team	Ref.
Cole McDonald	QB	Conquerors	Arizona Cardinals	
Lirim Hajrullahu	K	Generals	Carolina Panthers	
Bug Howard	TE	Alphas	Jacksonville Jaguars	
Brian Khoury	LS	Aviators	Baltimore Ravens	
Matthew Sexton	WR/KR	Aviators	Pittsburgh Steelers	
Bryan Scott	QB	Generals	Indianapolis Colts*	
Jordan Suell	WR	Generals	New England Patriots*	
Sal Cannella	TE	Generals	Indianapolis Colts*	

^{*} Workout.

=== CFL ===
Player	Position	TSL team	CFL team	Ref.
Blake Camper	OL	Generals	Toronto Argonauts	
Matt Mengel	K/P	Conquerors	Montreal Alouettes	
Matt Colburn II	RB	Blues	Toronto Argonauts	
Jordan Moore	LB	Generals	Toronto Argonauts	
DeWayne Hendrix	DE	Alphas	Toronto Argonauts	
Damon Webb	DB	Alphas	Saskatchewan Roughriders	
Kameron Kelly	DB	Jousters	Hamilton Tiger-Cats	
TJ Rahming	WR	Alphas	BC Lions	
DaShaun Amos	DB	Aviators	Calgary Stampeders	
Marcelis Branch	DB	Alphas	Calgary Stampeders	
Andrew Lauderdale	OL	Jousters	Saskatchewan Roughriders	
Kalil Morris	DL	Alphas	Calgary Stampeders	
Mason Bennett	DE	Blues	Hamilton Tiger-Cats	
Qaadir Sheppard	DE	Jousters	Calgary Stampeders	
Joe Walker	WR	Blues	Ottawa Redblacks	
Davon Grayson	WR	Alphas	Winnipeg Blue Bombers	
Jovon Durante	WR	Blues	Ottawa Redblacks	
Cameron Jefferson	OL	Conquerors	Saskatchewan Roughriders	
Rodney Randle	DB	Blues	Montreal Alouettes	
Channing Stribling	DB	Generals	Hamilton Tiger-Cats	
James Folston Jr.	LB	Jousters	Edmonton Football Team	
Ervin Philips	WR	Jousters	Ottawa Redblacks	
Cedric Wilcots II	DE	Blues	Winnipeg Blue Bombers	
Jocquez Kalili	DB	Alphas	Winnipeg Blue Bombers	
Kent Shelby II	WR	Aviators	Toronto Argonauts	
De’Veon Smith	RB	Aviators	BC Lions	
Tyler Roemer	OL	Blues	BC Lions	
DeMarquis Gates	LB	Blues	Saskatchewan Roughriders	
Ajene Harris	DB	Conquerors	BC Lions	
Nick Holley	WR	Conquerors	Calgary Stampeders	
Court Hammond	DL	Jousters	BC Lions	
Austin Joyner	DB	Alphas	BC Lions	
Kalil Morris	DL	Alphas	Calgary Stampeders	
Qaadir Sheppard	DL	Jousters	Calgary Stampeders	
Silas Stewart	LB	Alphas	Calgary Stampeders	
