= The Spring League =

American football developmental league

- Most recent season or competition: 2021 The Spring League season
- Classification: Developmental (Pro showcase)
- Sport: American football
- Founded: 2016
- First season: 2017
- Folded: 2021
- CEO: Brian Woods
- No. of teams: 8
- Country: United States
- Last champion: Linemen
- Broadcasters: United States: Fox/FS1/FS2
- Related competitions: Direct: USFL, XFL, UFL; Affiliated: IFL; Other: NFL, CFL, AAF, FXFL
- Website: TSL.com

The Spring League (TSL) was an American football developmental league and scouting event (pro showcase) that played from 2017 to 2021 and was founded by Brian Woods. Aimed at professional athletes but not paying a salary or expenses, the league's goal was to "serve as an instructional league and showcase for professional football talent".

The Spring League was the second football property to be established by Woods, following the Fall Experimental Football League (FXFL) from 2014 to 2015 and preceding the United States Football League revival in 2022. The league consisted of three to eight teams and played an abbreviated four to six game "season" in April or May. During the year, the league arranged additional scouting events, called Spring League Showcases, that began in July 2017. In 2025, three years after departing his position with the USFL, Woods revisited the showcase concept with The Pro Showcase.

According to the league records, as of May 2021, more than 100 former players have signed contracts with a National Football League (NFL) team.

== Background ==
The National Football League (NFL) has not had an official developmental league since 2007 with NFL Europe. Several other developmental leagues unaffiliated with the NFL have arisen, such as the FXFL, Gridiron Developmental Football League, and the Rivals Professional Football League.

On September 2, 2016, the FXFL, after two abbreviated seasons of operation, announced it had suspended operations in hopes of finding a more effective business model.

A developmental league continued to be an internal NFL discussion as of December 2016 with a decision deadline of February 2017.

== Business plan ==
Like the FXFL, The Spring League was built upon the concept of serving as a second opportunity to allow players to advance to more established professional leagues, yet The Spring League had some prominent differences from the FXFL. While The Spring League's core player was around 24 years old, it also took in experienced professionals, which the FXFL discouraged. All four teams were brought to one location, and at first not have distinctive identities or home cities/franchises (this began to change beginning in 2019). Rather, the games are more showcases for the NFL and Canadian Football League (CFL) scouts in the spring and summer months.

Unlike the FXFL, which paid a per-game stipend for its players, The Spring League paid only for room and board. Woods said that the lack of payment is out of financial necessity. To be eligible to participate in the league, a player may not be under contract with a pro league nor be eligible for the current year's draft. Players must also pay a $350 application fee. By 2019, the application fee had jumped to $2000, as players now also had to cover room and board as part of the fee; players with professional experience are exempt from this fee. Players must also cover their own health insurance. The league also assists in developing NFL referees.

The Spring League earns additional revenue from a subsidy that the state of Texas provides to hold its events there, as well as from organizations seeking to test equipment and rules changes. In 2019, the XFL served as The Spring League's largest revenue source, paying the league "six figures" to test-run its rulebook, a payment that allowed The Spring League to turn a profit that year for the first time. In October 2020 the league reached a multi-year agreement with FS1 to televise The Spring League along with the option to acquire a minority stake in the league.

== History ==
=== 2017 season ===
CEO Woods founded The Spring League in early 2016. On December 22, 2016, SiriusXM NFL Radio initially reported the league as being owned by the NFL, but retracted that by the end of the day. The NFL informed its teams of the league's existence and its plans to operate from April 5 through April 26, 2017. The Spring League's 2017 season consisted of a four-team, three-week single round-robin tournament in White Sulphur Springs, West Virginia at The Greenbrier resort in April, and a two-team "Showcase" game in Napa, California in July. The teams in each tournament were only identified with vague geographic names such as North, South, East, West and California. A game streamed on Facebook received 60,000 views while a practice received 30,000 views.

Coaches with long NFL or College experience included quarterback coach Terry Shea, Steve Fairchild, Donnie Henderson, Dennis Creehan and Art Valero (offensive line). For the April games, the league had four teams and 105 players. Its players included NFL veterans Fred Jackson, Anthony "Boobie" Dixon, Ben Tate, Greg Hardy, Ricky Stanzi, McLeod Bethel-Thompson and Ahmad Bradshaw. The players ranged from two to 10 years out from college.

The league indicated two CFL and 10 NFL teams had their scouts visit the league while another 20 made requests for video footage. Following the April games, roughly two dozen players were invited to NFL rookie mini-camps. The Carolina Panthers picked up six for their rookie mini-camp.

After the first season, NFL scouts seemed to like the league structure but otherwise gave mixed responses. Value was perceived by scouts as they got updated information on forgotten players or saw a player with a conditioned arm, but otherwise the talent level was below what NFL teams expected for an established developmental league. Some scouts expected younger players that had been to a couple of NFL training camps but in the wrong system. Woods indicated that the older and big names brought attention to the league, which has a secondary purpose of providing a veteran annual showcase.

==== Spring League Showcase ====
On July 15, 2017, the Spring League Showcase was held at Napa Memorial Stadium in California between Spring League California, coached by Terry Shea and Spring League East, coached by Donnie Henderson. Flofootball.com's FloPRO subscription service streamed the game. David Ash started the game for the California roster and lead several scoring drives. He had 96 passing yards and 9-of-13 passing, including a 4-yard touchdown pass to Anthony Dixon with an interception and 3 runs for a total of 10 yards with his longest for 9 yards. For the East, two quarterbacks, Casey Pachall and Trenton Norvell, made touchdown passes. Pachall completed 4-of-6 passes for 84 yards and a 67-yard touchdown. The game's top rusher was Paul Harris of the East team, who rushed twice for 74 yards and a 6-yard touchdown. East defeated California 23–19.

=== 2018 season ===
The league had try-outs in various cities in October and November 2017 and February 2018. On December 7, 2017, The Spring League announced it would play its second season in Austin, Texas beginning in late March 2018. The league was also to have a football-specific tech forum and a joint internship program with the University of Texas’ Center for Sports Leadership & Innovation. Turner Sports announced in mid-January 2018, while the league games would be on its new streaming service B/R Live, the league was also finalizing a deal to practice and play games at Circuit of the Americas near Austin, Texas. On February 14, the league announced the signing of Heisman Trophy winner and former Cleveland Browns first round pick Johnny Manziel to the league playing on the South team. Games were to be played on April 7 and 14. Other former NFL commitments to the league were former Cleveland Browns first round pick Kellen Winslow Jr. and former Baltimore Ravens running back Lorenzo Taliaferro. On March 3, the league did not execute on the contract to play the 2018 season at the Circuit of the Americas and instead announced events to take place at Kelly Reeves Athletic Complex in Round Rock, Texas.

==== Spring League Showcases ====
Following the April games another "Summer Showcase" was announced for July 2018.

The Spring League announced a "Fall Showcase" for Miami, Florida to take place November 6–9, 2018, which was intended to prepare players for the then-future AAF and XFL, which were set to play winter/spring seasons.

=== 2019 season ===
For the 2019 season, The Spring League partnered with the XFL to test rule changes the new league hoped to implement for its own 2020 season. One rule change, originally proposed by Pro Football Talk in 2017, was replacing overtime with a two-point conversion shootout occurring simultaneously at both end zones with five rounds in the TSL. Also tested was the tap rule, which allows a referee to send a player to the sideline for less than a penalty level offense. Both rules and the kickoff formation were later implemented in the XFL. The Spring League was also hired by the XFL to hold three mini-camp style tryouts. With this revenue source, the league's revenue exceeded one million dollars and would have its first profitable year. The two leagues were in preliminary discussions of the Spring League becoming the XFL's official development league.

2019 season practice began March 31, 2019 with double headers on April 6 and 11, 2019. Each of the four teams played two games. For the first time, one of the teams had a brand name; the Austin Generals (formerly South) was named after its host city of Austin, Texas, and used the logo and colors of the former New Jersey Generals of the United States Football League. The remaining three teams retained their generic North, East and West brandings.

==== Spring League Showcases ====
The league held its two "Summer Showcases" in partnership with the XFL - the first in June in Mission Viejo, California and the second on July 30 in Long Beach, California, 2019 with 100 pay-to-play players in a four-day camp and a six quarter scrimmage. XFL executives and coaches and ESPN and Fox staff were on hand to view rule tests and in-game technologies, with the broadcaster giving feedback on how it would effect broadcast coverage.

A "Fall Showcase" was held in September in Marietta, Georgia, and in November they held another showcase in Miami, Florida.

=== 2020 spring season ===
For 2020, TSL played a showcase game against the Japan national American football team at the Ford Center at The Star March 1, and the main competition March 7 and 11 at Sam Boyd Stadium. The designated home team (formerly West) was dubbed the Las Vegas Hughes, named after Howard Hughes, who spent much of the end of his life as a recluse in Las Vegas. Mettenberger agreed to return as a quarterback. The registration fee for The Spring League's March 2020 season in Las Vegas was $2,100.

The league was able to get most of its abbreviated 2020 season completed just before social distancing mandates tied to the COVID-19 pandemic in the United States took effect, shutting down effectively all in-person sports in the United States.

==== Summer Showcase ====
The league held its annual Summer Showcase in July in Glendale, Colorado with a total of 85 players and another 25 staff members and medical personnel participated. Because of the COVID-19 pandemic all players had to go through 14-day self-quarantine before camp and all meetings were conducted in a video conference.

=== 2020 fall season ===
In October 2020 FS1 reached a multi-year agreement to televise The Spring League along with the option to acquire a minority stake in the league, with initial agreement to play a 6-team fall-season in late October and November 2020. The league began its fall season on Oct. 27 with six teams competing in what was intended to be a 12-game format over four weeks in a bubble environment, based out of the San Antonio Alamodome. Fox Sports 1 aired games on Tuesday and Wednesday. The league stated that this time the players did not pay to attend, but Woods later explained that some players did pay, while select others did not.

All six teams had brands and names, including the returning Generals (originally from Austin), Aviators (re-branded from Las Vegas Hughes), and four new teams: the Blues (modified from the FXFL Blacktips), Alphas (a wolf motif), Conquerors and Jousters.

In November 2020, amid the then-resurgent COVID-19 pandemic, TSL announced that the league would be cancelling the final week of the season. The top two teams met in the final on December 15, at the Camping World Stadium in Orlando, Florida. The Generals finished as the first TSL champions, after beating the Aviators 37–14 in the final.

=== 2021 season ===
In March 2021, TSL announced that they reached a partnership agreement with Stephen Austin's American National Combines, and were to hold tryouts for the first time in league history. They also declared that players who were on an active roster during TSL's fall 2020 season were not required to participate in the tryouts. In April, TSL announced the 2021 season was to start on May 6, and would feature two new teams – the Linemen and Sea Lions (eight teams in total), competing in a six-week regular season from two hub cities: The North Division in Indianapolis, Indiana and the South Division in Houston, Texas. For the first time, one game every week will be broadcast on Fox including the championship game, while all other games will be broadcast on FS1 and FS2.

The Linemen beat the Jousters 26–23 in the first and only Mega Bowl, and won the TSL championship. Linemen QB Ryan Willis won both final and regular season MVP awards.

=== Aftermath ===
On June 3, 2021, Woods announced that he had acquired the remaining extant trademarks of the United States Football League with intent of launching a USFL-branded league in 2022, with Fox Sports remaining as a partner in the new USFL. What was to become of The Spring League remained, at the time, an unresolved question, but according to the initial announcement TSL was to continue, probably as a scouting showcase or developmental operation. It was later reported that TSL was no longer associated with the new USFL.

On February 18, 2022, Woods stated that TSL was "no longer operational", but later reports indicated that it will continue as a business although the football operations are suspended. Woods signed a three-year non-compete clause as part of his severance from the USFL.

In addition to the Generals, whose brand was used for the 2022 and 2023 USFL seasons (ostensibly tied to New Jersey but never playing there), the USFL and its successor the United Football League also retained the trademark of the Aviators, which was used for the Columbus Aviators, who began play in 2026.

==== Prep Super League ====
In June 2023 it was announced that Woods was planning to launch a 11-on-11 spring football league for high school players called the Prep Super League. Games were played from April 19 through May 24 with teams located in Atlanta, Cleveland, Dallas, Houston, New Jersey, New Orleans, Los Angeles, Miami, Phoenix, San Diego, San Francisco, and Tampa. Players were to pay a player development fee and provide their own insurance to participate. Isos Capital Management is one of the league's investors.

=== The Pro Showcase ===
In October 2025, Woods announced a single-game showcase, billed as The Pro Showcase with an identically designed wordmark to The Spring League's, which was held November 13, 2025 at an undisclosed location in Miami, Florida. It followed the same model as Woods's previous Spring League Showcases and featured 100 players, who paid a $1,299 fee to participate.

==== Pro events ====
- November 2025 - the first event was held in Miami, Florida, and took place from November 10th-13th, with three practices (Monday-Wednesday), followed up by a game on Thursday, November 13th. The teams were coached by Bart Andrus and Jerry Glanville. RB Marquez Carter and DE Paschal Ekeji who attended the camp would later sign with Ottawa Redblacks and New York Jets (respectively).
- April 2026 - the second event is being held in Atlanta, Georgia from April 27–30, 2026, timed to follow the 2026 NFL draft and aimed toward undrafted talent.

== Teams ==
Teams active at the last league season.

Division	Team	Colors	Original location	First year	Head coach
North	Alphas		N/A	2020	Peter Vaas
North	Aviators		Las Vegas	2020	Terry Shea
North	Conquerors		N/A	2020	Jerry Glanville
North	Linemen		N/A	2021	Hal Mumme
South	Blues		N/A	2020	Ted Cottrell
South	Generals		Austin	2019	Bart Andrus
South	Jousters		N/A	2020	Kevin Gilbride
South	Sea Lions		N/A	2021	Larry Kirksey

== Champions ==
Year	Winner	Runner-up	Score
2017*	Orange	Black	34–7
2018*	West		
2019*	Austin Generals		
2020 (spring)*	Las Vegas Hughes		
2020 (fall)	Generals	Aviators	37–14
2021	Linemen	Jousters	26–23

^{*} Before the 2020 Fall season, no official champion were named by the league.
