= 2020 Seattle Dragons season =

American professional football season

- Owner: Alpha Entertainment, LLC
- General manager: Jim Zorn
- Head coach: Jim Zorn
- Home stadium: CenturyLink Field

Results
- Record: 1–4
- League place: 4th XFL West

The 2020 Seattle Dragons season was the first season for the Seattle Dragons as a professional American football franchise. They played as charter members of the XFL, one of eight teams to compete in the league for the 2020 season. The Dragons played their home games at CenturyLink Field and were led by head coach Jim Zorn.

Their inaugural season was cut short due to the COVID-19 pandemic and the XFL officially suspended operations for the remainder of the season on March 20, 2020.

== Offseason ==
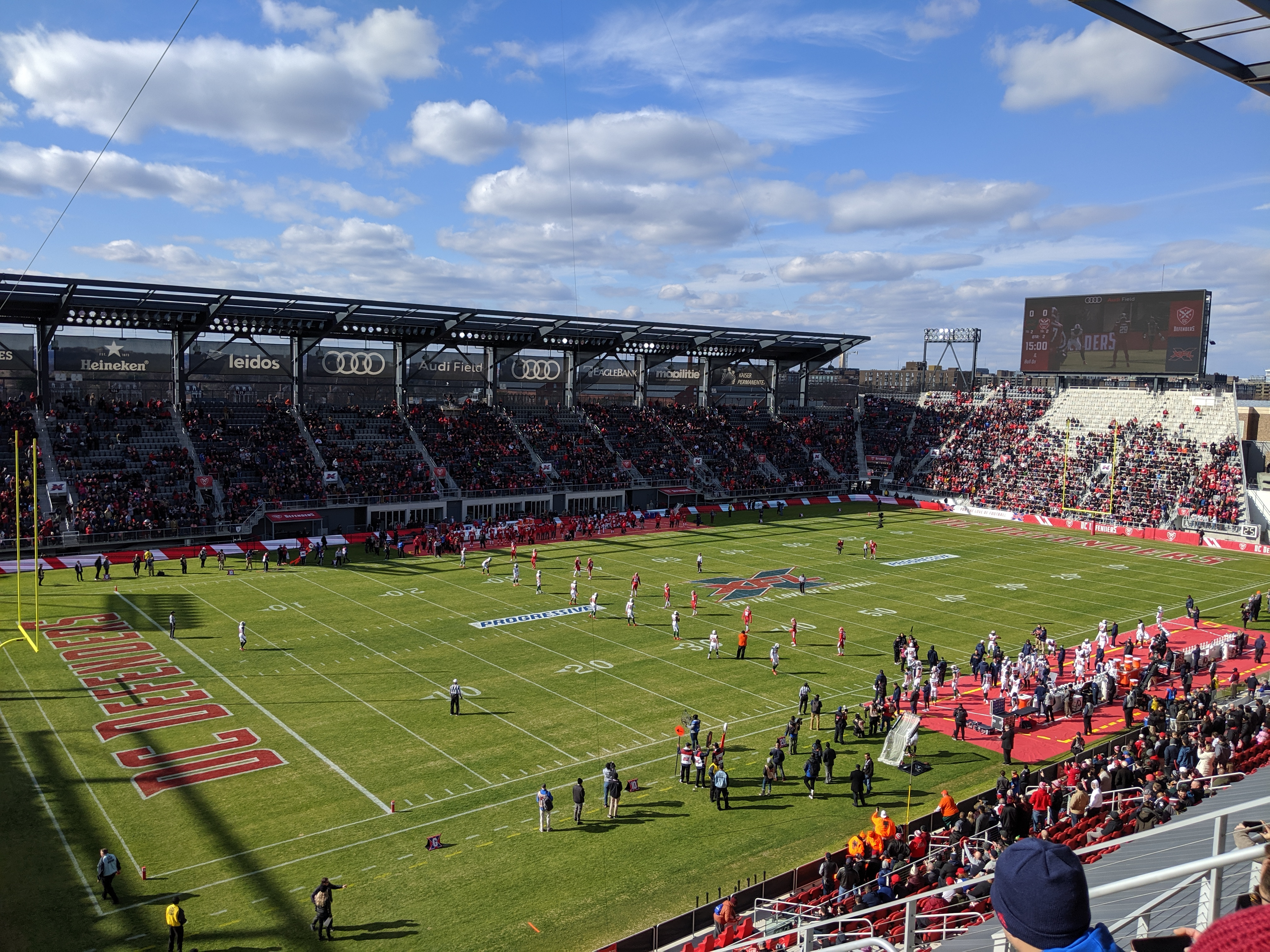
First ever XFL kickoff against the DC Defenders at Audi Field

=== XFL draft ===
==== Tier 1 Quarterback Allocations ====
Player	Pos.	College
Brandon Silvers	QB	Troy

==== Phase 1: Skill Players ====
Rnd.	Pick #	Player	Pos.	College
1	7	Trey Williams	RB	Texas A&M
2	10	Kenneth Farrow	RB	Houston
3	23	Fred Ross	WR	Mississippi State
4	26	Jace Amaro	TE	Texas Tech
5	39	Keenan Reynolds	WR	Navy
6	42	Evan Rodriguez	TE	Temple
7	55	Kasen Williams	WR	Washington
8	58	John Santiago	WR	North Dakota
9	71	Cam Clear	TE	Texas A&M
10	74	Malachi Jones	WR	Appalachian State

==== Phase 2: Offensive Line ====
Rnd.	Pick #	Player	Pos.	College
1	2	Isaiah Battle	OT	Clemson
2	15	Venzell Boulware	G	Tennessee
3	18	Dillon Day	OT	Mississippi State
4	31	Cyril Richardson	G	Baylor
5	34	Quinterrius Eatmon	OT	South Florida
6	47	Michael Dunn	OT	Maryland
7	50	Kirk Barron	C	Purdue
8	63	Jordan Rose	OT	Idaho
9	66	Robert Myers	G	Tennessee State
10	79	Craig McCorkle	OT	California (PA)

==== Phase 3: Defensive Front Seven ====
Rnd.	Pick #	Player	Pos.	College
1	3	Stansly Maponga	DE	TCU
2	14	Nick Temple	LB	Cincinnati
3	19	Will Sutton	DT	Arizona State
4	30	Tenny Palepoi	DE	Utah
5	35	Jacquies Smith	DE	Missouri
6	46	Steven Johnson	LB	Kansas
7	51	Taniela Tupou	DT	Washington
8	62	Danny Ezechukwu	DE	Purdue
9	67	Pasoni Tasini	DT	Utah
10	78	Praise Martin-Oguike	DE	Temple

==== Phase 4: Defensive Backs ====
Rnd.	Pick #	Player	Pos.	College
1	6	Jhavonte Dean	CB	Miami (FL)
2	11	Chris Davis	CB	Auburn
3	22	Kentrell Brice	S	Louisiana Tech
4	27	Steve Williams	CB	California
5	38	Channing Stribling	CB	Michigan
6	43	Cody Brown	S	Arkansas State
7	54	Jordan Martin	S	Syracuse
8	59	Tyson Graham	S	South Dakota
9	70	Mohammed Seisay	CB	Nebraska
10	75	Sterling Moore	CB	SMU

==== Phase 5: Open Draft ====
Player	Pos.	College
Joe Callahan	QB	Wesley
Lavon Coleman	RB	
Mikah Holder	WR	
Austin Proehl	WR	
Connor Hamlett	TE	
Colin Jeter	TE	
Marcell Frazier	DE	
Anthony Johnson	DT	
Jeremy Liggins	DT	
Dante Booker	LB	
Nyles Morgan	LB	Notre Dame
Gionni Paul	LB	
Greg Joseph	K	
Brock Miller	P	Southern Utah
Noah Borden	LS	Hawaii

== Final roster ==
2020 Seattle Dragons final roster
Quarterbacks: 7 B. J. Daniels; 3 Justin Holman; 12 Brandon Silvers; Running backs: 20 Kenneth Farrow; 31 Ja'Quan Gardner; 23 Trey Williams; Wide receivers: 16 Dontez Byrd; 15 K. D. Cannon; 11 Mikah Holder; 1 Alonzo Moore; 17 Reuben Mwehla; 13 Austin Proehl; 19 Keenan Reynolds; 10 John Santiago; 2 Kasen Williams; Tight ends: 89 Connor Hamlett; 81 Colin Jeter; 84 Ben Johnson; 88 Evan Rodriguez	Offensive linemen: 73 Kirk Barron G/C; 79 Isaiah Battle T; 75 Venzell Boulware G; 50 Dillon Day C; 76 Michael Dunn T/G; 77 Quinterrius Eatmon T; 78 Brandon Haskin T; 70 Robert Myers G; Defensive linemen: 57 Marcell Frazier DE; 58 Martin Ifedi DE; 91 Anthony Johnson DT; 90 Stansly Maponga DE; 51 Praise Martin-Oguike DE; 97 Durrant Miles DE; 72 Anthony Moten DT; 95 Jacquies Smith DE; 93 Will Sutton DT; 94 Pasoni Tasini DT; 99 Jordan Thompson DT; 92 Tani Tupou DT	Linebackers: 59 Steven Johnson OLB; 56 Nyles Morgan MLB; 55 Nick Temple OLB; 54 Korey Toomer OLB; Defensive backs: 27 Johnathan Alston CB; 34 Jeremy Clark CB; 32 Tyson Graham SS; 35 Godwin Igwebuike SS; 29 Derrick Jones CB; 33 Jordan Martin FS; 24 Marko Myers CB; 28 Jermaine Ponder CB; 39 Santos Ramirez FS; 30 Channing Stribling CB; Special teams: 41 Noah Borden LS; 5 Ernesto Lacayo K; 9 Brock Miller P	Reserve lists: -- Brandon Bell LB (IR); -- Gionni Paul LB (IR); 52 Kyle Queiro MLB (IR); 68 Cyril Richardson G (IR); 21 Mohammed Seisay CB (IR); 25 Steve Williams CB (IR); 56 active, 6 inactive

== Staff ==
2020 Seattle Dragons staff
Front office: President – Ryan Gustafson; Director of player personnel – Tony Softli; Director of Football Operations – Matthew Hayes; Head coaches: Head coach/general manager – Jim Zorn; Offensive coaches: Offensive coordinator – Mike Riley; Running backs – Butch Goncharoff; Receivers – Larry Kirksey; Tight ends – Steve Hagen; Offensive Line – Steve Smith	Defensive coaches: Defensive coordinator – Clayton Lopez; Defensive Line – Donald Johnson; Linebackers – Mark Criner; Special teams coaches: Special teams coordinator/Defensive Backs – Chip Garber

== Standings ==
2020 XFL standings
East Division
Team	W	L	PCT	TD+/-	TD+	TD-	DIV	PF	PA	DIFF	STK
DC Defenders	3	2	.600	-3	9	12	2–1	82	89	-7	W1
St. Louis BattleHawks	3	2	.600	3	11	8	1–1	97	77	20	L1
New York Guardians	3	2	.600	-1	8	9	1–2	79	85	-6	W2
Tampa Bay Vipers	1	4	.200	-4	11	15	1–1	98	115	-17	L1
West Division
Team	W	L	PCT	TD+/-	TD+	TD-	DIV	PF	PA	DIFF	STK
Houston Roughnecks	5	0	1.000	7	21	14	3–0	158	111	47	W5
Dallas Renegades	2	3	.400	-3	9	12	2–1	90	102	-12	L2
Los Angeles Wildcats	2	3	.400	4	18	14	0–2	129	122	7	W1
Seattle Dragons	1	4	.200	-3	12	15	0–2	87	119	-32	L3
(x)–clinched playoff berth; (y)–clinched conference; (e)–eliminated from playoff contention

== Schedule ==
All times Pacific

Week	Day	Date	Kickoff	TV	Opponent	Results		Location
Week	Day	Date	Kickoff	TV	Opponent	Score	Record	Location
1	Saturday	February 8	11:00 a.m.	ABC	at DC Defenders	L 19–31	0–1	Audi Field
2	Saturday	February 15	2:00 p.m.	Fox	Tampa Bay Vipers	W 17–9	1–1	CenturyLink Field
3	Saturday	February 22	2:00 p.m.	Fox	Dallas Renegades	L 12–24	1–2	CenturyLink Field
4	Saturday	February 29	2:00 p.m.	Fox	at St. Louis Battlehawks	L 16–23	1–3	The Dome at America's Center
5	Saturday	March 7	11:00 a.m.	ABC	at Houston Roughnecks	L 23–32	1–4	TDECU Stadium
6	Sunday	March 15	4:00 p.m.	ESPN	Los Angeles Wildcats	Not played		CenturyLink Field
7	Sunday	March 22	12:00 p.m.	ABC	New York Guardians	Not played		CenturyLink Field
8	Sunday	March 29	3:00 p.m.	FS1	at Dallas Renegades	Not played		Globe Life Park in Arlington
9	Sunday	April 5	3:00 p.m.	FS1	at Los Angeles Wildcats	Not played		Dignity Health Sports Park
10	Saturday	April 11	11:00 a.m.	ABC	Houston Roughnecks	Not played		CenturyLink Field

== Game summaries ==
=== Week 1: at DC Defenders ===
Week 1 — Seattle Dragons at DC Defenders

Quarter	1	2	3	4	Total
Dragons	6	7	6	0	19
Defenders	3	9	13	6	31

at Audi Field, Washington, D.C.

- Date: February 8
- Game time: 11:00 a.m. PST/ 2:00 p.m. EST
- Game weather: Cloudy • Temperature: 43 °F (6 °C) • Wind: SW 7 mph
- Game attendance: 17,163
- Referee: Reggie Smith
- TV announcers (ABC): Steve Levy (play-by-play), Greg McElroy (analyst), Tom Luginbill and Dianna Russini (sideline)

Game information

First quarter

- DC – Tyler Rausa 34-yard field goal, 7:20. Defenders 3–0. Drive: 13 plays, 63 yards, 5:49.
- SEA – Austin Proehl 14-yard pass from Brandon Silvers (1-pt. failed), 4:25. Dragons 6–3. Drive: 6 plays, 67 yards, 2:55.

Second quarter

- DC – Jonathan Celestin recovered blocked punt in end zone (2-pt. failed), 6:56. Defenders 9–6
- SEA – Brandon Silvers 13-yard pass to Trey Williams (1-pt. good), 0:20. Dragons 13–9. Drive: 9 plays, 60 yards, 2:11.
- DC – Tyler Rausa 54-yard field goal, 0:00. Dragons 13–12. Drive: 4 plays, 8 yards, 0:20.

Third quarter

- DC – Khari Lee 39-yard pass from Cardale Jones (1-pt. good), 12:07. Defenders 19–13. Drive: 6 plays, 78 yards, 3:04.
- SEA – Austin Proehl 57-yard pass from Barndon Silvers (1-pt. failed), 10:42. Tied 19–19. Drive: 3 plays, 67 yards, 1:28.
- DC – Rashad Ross 31-yard pass from Cardale Jones (1-pt. failed), 1:45. Defenders 25–19. Drive: 5 plays, 55 yards, 2:35.

Fourth quarter

- DC – Bradley Sylve 69-yard interception return (1-pt. failed), 12:55. Defenders 31–19.

Top passers

- SEA – Brandon Silvers – 21/40, 217 yards, 3 TD, 2 INT
- DC – Cardale Jones – 16/26, 291 yards, 2 TD

Top rushers

- SEA – Kenneth Farrow – 7 carries, 41 yards
- DC – Cardale Jones – 6 carries, 33 yards

Top receivers

- SEA – Austin Proehl – 5 receptions, 88 yards, 2 TD
- DC – Eli Rogers – 6 receptions, 73 yards

The Seattle Dragons played in the first game of the revived XFL, playing on the road against the DC Defenders. The Dragons scored the first touchdown of the new XFL on a 14-yard pass from Brandon Silvers to Austin Proehl in the 1st quarter.

=== Week 2: vs. Tampa Bay Vipers ===
Week 2 — Tampa Bay Vipers at Seattle Dragons

Quarter	1	2	3	4	Total
Vipers	0	3	6	0	9
Dragons	0	0	14	3	17

at CenturyLink Field, Seattle, Washington

- Date: February 15
- Game time: 2:00 p.m. PST/ 5:00 p.m. EST
- Game weather: Rain • Temperature: 46 °F (8 °C) • Wind: S 12 mph
- Game attendance: 29,172
- Referee: Tra Blake
- TV announcers (Fox): Curt Menefee (play-by-play), Joel Klatt (analyst)

Game information

First quarter

- None

Second quarter

- TB – Andrew Franks 36-yard field goal, 2:36. Vipers 3–0. Drive: 9 plays, 44 yards, 4:58.

Third quarter

- TB – Tarvarus McFadden 78-yard interception return (1-pt failed), 12:18. Vipers 9–0.
- SEA – Keenan Reynolds 68-yard pass from Brandon Silvers (2-pt failed), 11:26. Vipers 9–6. Drive: 2 plays, 69 yards, 0:33.
- SEA – Marcell Frazier 1-yard interception return (2-pt good), 5:31. Dragons 14–9.

Fourth quarter

- SEA – Ernesto Lacayo 27-yard field goal, 1:07. Dragons 17–9. Drive: 7 plays, 35 yards, 1:38.

Top passers

- TB – Taylor Cornelius – 16/27, 154 yards, 2 INT
- SEA – Brandon Silvers – 7/18, 91 yards, TD, INT

Top rushers

- TB – Jacques Patrick – 14 carries, 73 yards
- SEA – Trey Williams – 11 carries, 45 yards

Top receivers

- TB – Reece Horn – 5 receptions, 51 yards
- SEA – Keenan Reynolds – 3 receptions, 87 yards, 1 TD

=== Week 3: vs. Dallas Renegades ===
Week 3 — Dallas Renegades at Seattle Dragons

Quarter	1	2	3	4	Total
Renegades	6	0	6	12	24
Dragons	6	6	0	0	12

at CenturyLink Field, Seattle, Washington

- Date: February 22
- Game time: 2:00 p.m. PST/ 5:00 p.m. EST
- Game weather: Cloudy • Temperature: 49 °F (9 °C) • Wind: ENE 1 mph
- Game attendance: 22,060
- Referee: John O'Neill
- TV announcers (Fox): Curt Menefee (play-by-play), Joel Klatt (analyst), Brock Huard (sideline)

Game information

First quarter

- SEA – Austin Proehl 21-yard pass from Brandon Silvers (2-pt. failed), 7:23. Dragons 6–0. Drive: 10 plays, 57 yards, 5:10.
- DAL – Flynn Nagel 12-yard pass from Landry Jones (2-pt. failed), 0:48. Tied 6–6. Drive: 13 plays, 82 yards, 6:33.

Second quarter

- SEA – Kenneth Farrow 19-yard pass from Brandon Silvers (2-pt. failed), 1:31. Dragons 12–6. Drive: 8 plays, 71 yards, 3:35.

Third quarter

- DAL – Donald Parham 10-yard pass from Landry Jones (2-pt. failed), 3:53. Tied 12–12. Drive: 12 plays, 62 yards, 5:52.

Fourth quarter

- DAL – Austin MacGinnis 19-yard field goal, 12:45. Renegades 15–12. Drive: 10 plays, 54 yards, 4:19.
- DAL – Donald Parham 65-yard pass from Landry Jones (2-pt. failed), 8:58. Renegades 21–12. Drive: 3 plays, 66 yards, 1:24.
- DAL – Austin MacGinnis 33-yard field goal, 0:47. Renegades 24–12. Drive: 11 plays, 58 yards, 4:19.

Top passers

- DAL – Landry Jones – 30/41, 274 yards, 3 TD, 2 INT
- SEA – Brandon Silvers – 21/34, 204 yards, 2 TD, INT

Top rushers

- DAL – Cameron Artis-Payne – 13 carries, 80 yards
- SEA – Ja'Quan Gardner – 8 carries, 37 yards

Top receivers

- DAL – Donald Parham – 5 receptions, 101 yards, 2 TD
- SEA – Austin Proehl – 6 receptions, 81 yards, TD

=== Week 4: at St. Louis BattleHawks ===
Week 4 — Seattle at St. Louis

Quarter	1	2	3	4	Total
Dragons	0	3	7	6	16
BattleHawks	11	6	3	3	23

at The Dome at America's Center, St. Louis, Missouri

- Date: February 29
- Game time: 2:00 p.m. CST
- Game weather: N/A (Indoor)
- Game attendance: 27,527
- Referee: Reggie Smith
- TV announcers (Fox): Curt Menefee (play-by-play), Joel Klatt (analyst), Brock Huard (sideline)

Game information

First quarter

- STL – De'Mornay Pierson-El 27-yard pass from Jordan Ta'amu (2-pt. good), 6:43. BattleHawks 8–0. Drive: 9 plays, 96 yards, 4:44.
- STL – Taylor Russolino 48-yard field goal, 0:13. BattleHawks 11–0. Drive: 9 plays, 32 yards, 5:01.

Second quarter

- SEA – Ernesto Lacayo 41-yard field goal, 13:31. BattleHawks 11–3. Drive: 5 plays, 22 yards, 1:39.
- STL – Keith Ford 13-yard rush (2-pt. failed), 2:00. BattleHawks 17–3. Drive: 12 plays, 78 yards, 7:05.

Third quarter

- SEA – Kenneth Farrow 1-yard rush (1-pt. good), 8:04. BattleHawks 17–10. Drive: 5 plays, 65 yards, 2:28.
- STL – Taylor Russolino 38-yard field goal, 1:05. BattleHawks 20–10. Drive: 13 plays, 46 yards, 6:59.

Fourth quarter

- SEA – Evan Rodriguez 10-yard pass from B. J. Daniels (3-pt. failed), 13:18. BattleHawks 20–16.
- STL – Taylor Russolino 25-yard field goal, 8:14. BattleHawks 23–16. Drive: 9 plays, 77 yards, 5:04.

Top passers

- SEA – B. J. Daniels – 5/10, 100 yards, TD, INT
- STL – Jordan Ta'amu – 20/27, 264 yards, TD

Top rushers

- SEA – B. J. Daniels – 7 carries, 84 yards
- STL – Jordan Ta'amu – 16 carries, 63 yards

Top receivers

- SEA – Alonzo Moore – 1 reception, 57 yards
- STL – De'Mornay Pierson-El – 5 receptions, 71 yards, TD

=== Week 5: at Houston Roughnecks ===
Week 5 — Seattle at Houston

Quarter	1	2	3	4	Total
Dragons	6	8	9	0	23
Roughnecks	0	14	6	12	32

at TDECU Stadium, Houston, Texas

- Date: March 7
- Game time: 1:00 p.m. CST / 11:00 a.m. PST
- Game weather: Partly cloudy • Temperature: 59 °F (15 °C) • Wind: NNE 5 mph
- Referee: Tra Blake
- TV announcers (ABC): Steve Levy (play-by-play), Greg McElroy (analyst), Tom Luginbill and Dianna Russini (sideline)

Game information

First quarter

- SEA – B. J. Daniels 1-yard rush (2-pt. failed), 3:29. Dragons 6–0. Drive: 7 plays, 18 yards, 3:18.

Second quarter

- SEA – Trey Williams 17-yard rush (2-pt. good), 9:29. Dragons 14–0. Drive: 8 plays, 54 yards, 3:59.
- HOU – Nick Holley 50-yard pass from Phillip Walker (3-pt. failed), 6:26. Dragons 14–6. Drive: 5 plays, 80 yards, 3:04.
- HOU – James Butler 1-yard rush (2-pt. good), Tied 14–14. Drive: 8 plays, 90 yards, 2:20.

Third quarter

- SEA – Ernesto Lacayo 47-yard field goal, 10:51. Dragons 17–14. Drive: 10 plays, 40 yards, 4:12.
- SEA – B. J. Daniels 1-yard rush (2-pt. failed), 9:01. Dragons 23–14. Drive: 1 play, 1 yard, 0:05.
- HOU – James Butler 8-yard rush (3-pt. failed), 7:03. Dragons 23–20. Drive: 4 plays, 64 yards, 1:58.

Fourth quarter

- HOU – Cam Phillips 5-yard pass from Phillip Walker (2-pt. failed), 9:08. Roughnecks 26–23. Drive: 12 plays, 64 yards, 5:46.
- HOU – Cam Phillips 11-yard pass from Phillip Walker (1-pt. failed), 3:36. Roughnecks 32–23. Drive: 8 plays, 66 yards, 3:42.

Top passers

- SEA – B. J. Daniels – 14/22, 114 yards
- HOU – Phillip Walker – 27/38, 351 yards, 3 TD, 2 INT

Top rushers

- SEA – B. J. Daniels – 10 carries, 30 yards, 2 TD
- HOU – Andre Williams – 10 carries, 54 yards

Top receivers

- SEA – Austin Proehl – 3 receptions, 56 yards
- HOU – Cam Phillips – 10 receptions, 122 yards, 2 TD
