= 2020 Dallas Renegades season =

American professional football season

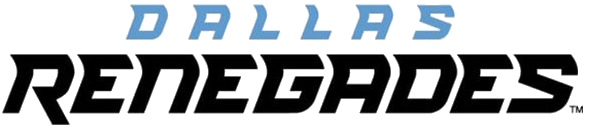
- Owner: Alpha Entertainment, LLC
- General manager: Bob Stoops
- Head coach: Bob Stoops
- Home stadium: Globe Life Park in Arlington

Results
- Record: 2–3
- League place: Tie 2nd XFL West

Uniform
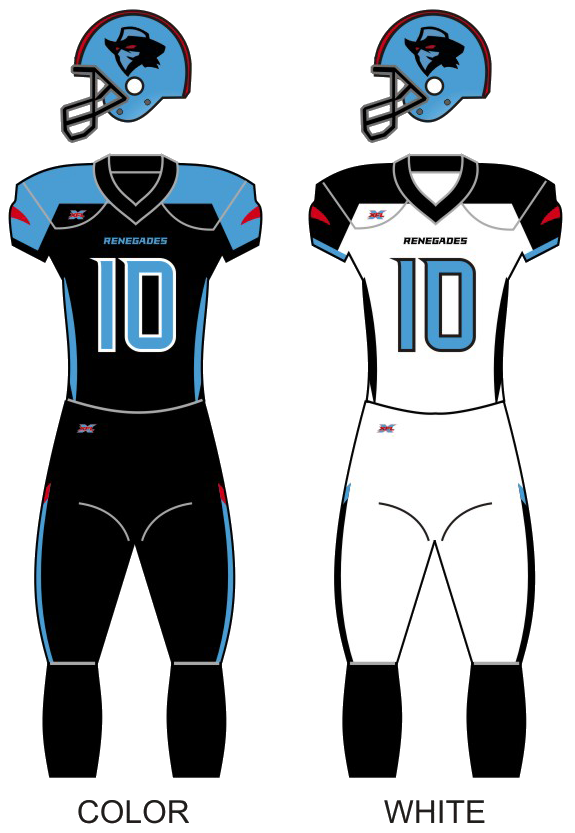

The 2020 Dallas Renegades season was the first season for the Dallas Renegades as a professional American football franchise. They played as charter members of the XFL, one of eight teams to compete in the league for the 2020 season. The Renegades played their home games at the Globe Life Park in Arlington and were led by head coach Bob Stoops.

Their inaugural season was cut short due to the COVID-19 pandemic and the XFL officially suspended operations for the remainder of the season on March 20, 2020.

== Standings ==
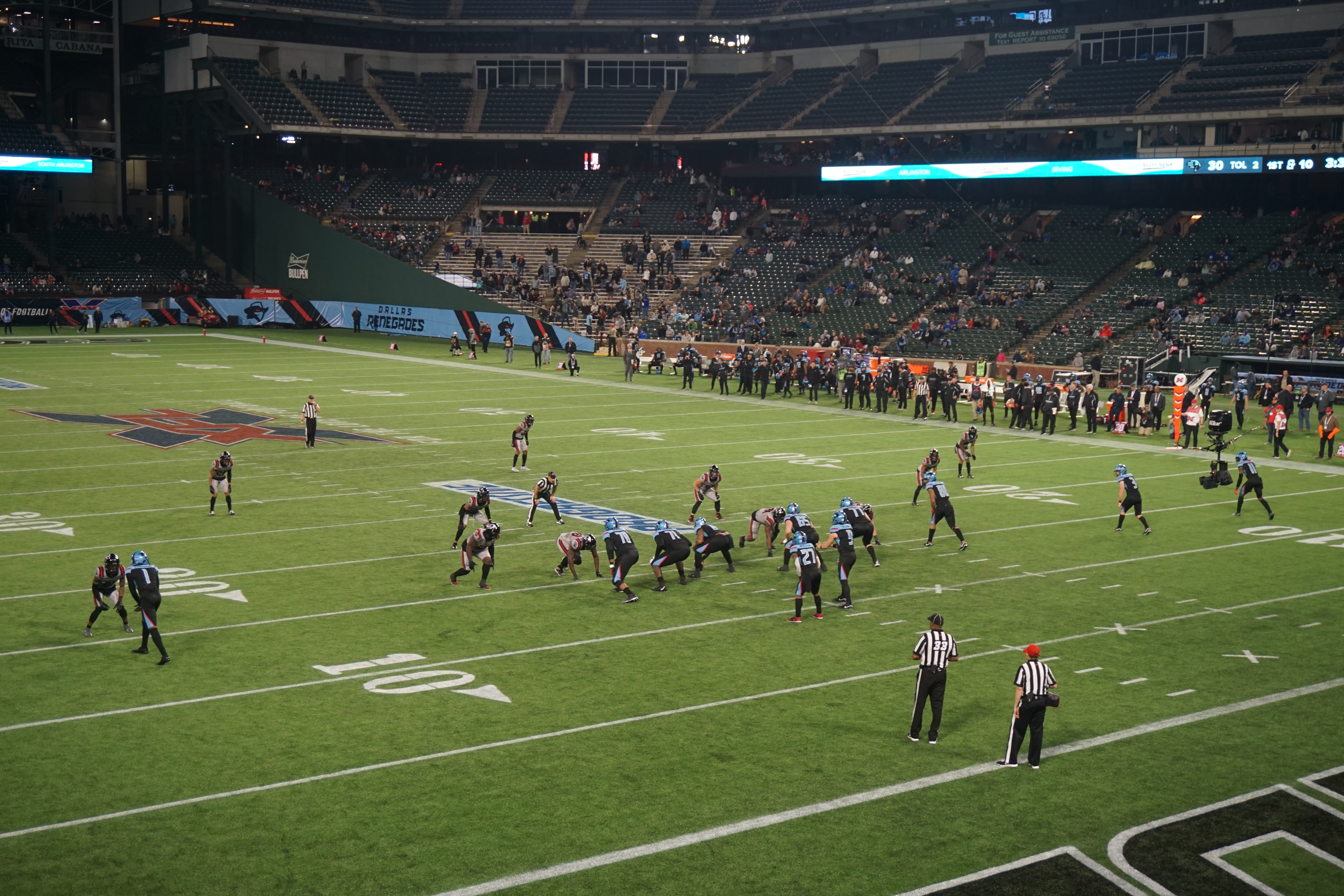
Dallas in action against New York

2020 XFL standings
East Division
Team	W	L	PCT	TD+/-	TD+	TD-	DIV	PF	PA	DIFF	STK
DC Defenders	3	2	.600	-3	9	12	2–1	82	89	-7	W1
St. Louis BattleHawks	3	2	.600	3	11	8	1–1	97	77	20	L1
New York Guardians	3	2	.600	-1	8	9	1–2	79	85	-6	W2
Tampa Bay Vipers	1	4	.200	-4	11	15	1–1	98	115	-17	L1
West Division
Team	W	L	PCT	TD+/-	TD+	TD-	DIV	PF	PA	DIFF	STK
Houston Roughnecks	5	0	1.000	7	21	14	3–0	158	111	47	W5
Dallas Renegades	2	3	.400	-3	9	12	2–1	90	102	-12	L2
Los Angeles Wildcats	2	3	.400	4	18	14	0–2	129	122	7	W1
Seattle Dragons	1	4	.200	-3	12	15	0–2	87	119	-32	L3
(x)–clinched playoff berth; (y)–clinched conference; (e)–eliminated from playoff contention

== Schedule ==
All times Central

Week	Day	Date	Kickoff	TV	Opponent	Results		Location
Week	Day	Date	Kickoff	TV	Opponent	Score	Record	Location
1	Sunday	February 9	4:00 p.m.	ESPN	St. Louis BattleHawks	L 9–15	0–1	Globe Life Park in Arlington
2	Sunday	February 16	2:00 p.m.	ABC	at Los Angeles Wildcats	W 25–18	1–1	Dignity Health Sports Park
3	Saturday	February 22	4:00 p.m.	Fox	at Seattle Dragons	W 24–12	2–1	CenturyLink Field
4	Sunday	March 1	3:00 p.m.	FS1	Houston Roughnecks	L 20–27	2–2	Globe Life Park in Arlington
5	Saturday	March 7	4:00 p.m.	Fox	New York Guardians	L 12–30	2–3	Globe Life Park in Arlington
6	Sunday	March 15	3:00 p.m.	FS1	at DC Defenders	Not played		Audi Field
7	Saturday	March 21	1:00 p.m.	ABC	at Tampa Bay Vipers	Not played		Raymond James Stadium
8	Sunday	March 29	5:00 p.m.	FS1	Seattle Dragons	Not played		Globe Life Park in Arlington
9	Thursday	April 2	7:00 p.m.	Fox	at Houston Roughnecks	Not played		TDECU Stadium
10	Thursday	April 9	7:00 p.m.	Fox	Los Angeles Wildcats	Not played		Globe Life Park in Arlington

== Final roster ==
2020 Dallas Renegades final roster
Quarterbacks: 7 Eric Dungey; 12 Landry Jones; 9 Philip Nelson; 4 Brogan Roback (QB exempt); Running backs: 34 Cameron Artis-Payne; 25 Lance Dunbar; 27 Austin Walter; 22 Marquis Young; Wide receivers: 13 Jeff Badet; 11 Joshua Crockett; 10 Armanti Edwards; 1 Jazz Ferguson; 16 Jerrod Heard; 3 Flynn Nagel; 17 Kermit Whitfield; Tight ends: 86 Julian Allen; 82 Romello Brooker; 49 Donald Parham; 80 Sean Price	Offensive linemen: 66 Josh Allen G/C; 65 Alex Balducci G; 70 Willie Beavers T; 71 Justin Evans T; 62 Darius James T; 52 John Keenoy G; 69 Patrick Lawrence T; 77 Pace Murphy T; 61 Maurquice Shakir C; 74 Salesi Uhatafe G; Defensive linemen: 57 Frank Alexander DE; 94 Omarius Bryant DE; 96 Winston Craig DE; 93 Tony Guerad NT; 91 Tomasi Laulile NT; 98 Gelen Robinson DE; 95 Tyrell Thompson NT	Linebackers: 59 Jesse Aniebonam OLB; 58 Asantay Brown ILB; 50 Reshard Cliett ILB; 51 Ray Ray Davison ILB; 55 James Folston III OLB; 48 Greer Martini ILB; 47 Tobenna Okeke OLB; 99 Gerald Rivers OLB; 46 Tegray Scales ILB; 40 Tre Watson ILB; Defensive backs: 21 Micah Abernathy FS; 20 Tenny Adewusi CB/SS; 26 Donatello Brown CB; 24 Treston Decoud CB; 29 Marwin Evans SS; 28 Josh Hawkins CB; 41 Dashaun Phillips CB; 31 Derron Smith FS; 38 D'Montre Wade CB; Special teams: 2 Drew Galitz P; 43 Christian Kuntz LS; 8 Austin MacGinnis K	Reserve lists: -- Drew Bailey II DT (IR); -- Izaah Burks DT (IR); 59 Johnathan Calvin OLB (IR); -- Steven Dunbar WR (IR); -- Dimitri Flowers RB (IR); 45 Doyin Jibowu SS (IR); 44 Hauʻoli Kikaha OLB Retired; -- Ronald Martin S (IR); 18 Freddie Martino WR (IR); 58 active, 8 inactive

== Staff ==
2020 Dallas Renegades staff
Front office: President – Grady Raskin; Director of player personnel – Daryl Johnston; Director of Football Operations – Matt McMillen; Head coaches: Head coach/general manager – Bob Stoops; Offensive coaches: Offensive coordinator – Hal Mumme; Running backs – Bobby Blizzard; Receivers – Jarrail Jackson; Tight ends – Scott Spurrier; Offensive Line – Jeff Jagodzinski	Defensive coaches: Defensive coordinator – Chris Woods; Defensive line – Jim Jeffcoat; Linebackers – Mickey Matthews; Cornerbacks – Marvin Sanders; Safeties – Kenny Perry

== Season summary ==
The Renegades lost their first game of the season at home against the St. Louis BattleHawks 15–9, with Philip Nelson replacing an injured Landry Jones at the starting QB position. Landry came back in week 2 to lead Dallas to their first win of the season against the Los Angeles Wildcats, winning 25–18. They also beat the Seattle Dragons next week on the road 24–12, but then dropping to 2-2 after losing at home 27–20 to the then undefeated Houston Roughnecks. The Renegades suffered another loss in week 5, losing to the New York Guardians at home 30-12 before the season's premature end. The Renegades were the only team in the 2020 XFL season to not win a single game at home.

== Game summaries ==
=== Week 1: vs. St. Louis BattleHawks ===
Week 1 — St. Louis at Dallas

Quarter	1	2	3	4	Total
BattleHawks	0	6	0	9	15
Renegades	0	6	3	0	9

at Globe Life Park in Arlington, Arlington, Texas

- Date: Sunday, February 9
- Game time: 4:00 p.m. CST
- Game weather: Cloudy • Temperature: 66 °F (19 °C) • Wind: S 12 mph
- Game attendance: 17,206
- Referee: James Carter
- TV announcers (ESPN): Tom Hart (play-by-play), Joey Galloway (analyst), Pat McAfee (sideline)
- Stats

Game information

First quarter
No scoring
Second quarter

- DAL – Austin MacGinnis 32-yard field goal, 9:46. Renegades 3–0. Drive: 13 plays, 50 yards, 5:37.
- STL – Keith Ford 16-yard rush (2-pt. failed), 1:26. BattleHawks 6–3. Drive: 10 plays, 62 yards, 3:20.
- DAL – Austin MacGinnis 42-yard field goal, 0:08. Tied 6–6. Drive: 8 plays, 50 yards, 1:17.

Third quarter

- DAL – Austin MacGinnis 23-yard field goal, 5:57. Renegades 9–6. Drive: 9 plays, 61, 4:43.

Fourth quarter

- STL – Alonzo Russell 9-yard pass from Jordan Ta'amu (1-pt. failed). BattleHawks 12–9. Drive: 11 plays, 83 yards, 4:04.
- STL – Taylor Russolino 48-yard field goal. BattleHawks 15–9. Drive: 10 plays, 68 yards, 4:42.

Top passers

- STL – Jordan Ta'amu – 20/27, 209 yards, TD
- DAL – Philip Nelson – 33/42, 209 yards, INT

Top rushers

- STL – Matt Jones – 21 rushes, 85 yards
- DAL – Lance Dunbar – 5 rushes, 27 yards

Top receivers

- STL – De'Mornay Pierson-El – 4 receptions, 61 yards
- DAL – Flynn Nagel – 6 receptions, 43 yards

The Renegades were the only home team to lose in week 1.

=== Week 2: at Los Angeles Wildcats ===
Week 2 — Dallas at Los Angeles

Quarter	1	2	3	4	Total
Renegades	0	3	3	19	25
Wildcats	0	3	0	15	18

at Dignity Health Sports Park, Los Angeles, California

- Date: Sunday, February 16
- Game time: 4:00 p.m. CST/2:00 p.m. PST
- Game weather: Sunny • Temperature: 70 °F (21 °C) • Wind: SW 3 mph
- Game attendance: 14,979
- Referee: Reggie Smith
- TV announcers (ABC, ESPN Deportes): Tom Hart (play-by-play), Joey Galloway (analyst), Pat McAfee (sideline)

Game information

First quarter
No scoring
Second quarter

- LA – Nick Novak 47-yard field goal, 3:11. Wildcats 3–0. Drive: 9 plays, 38 yards, 4:39.
- DAL – Austin MacGinnis 41-yard field goal, 0:11. Tied 3–3. Drive: 12 plays, 50 yards, 2:49.

Third quarter

- DAL – Austin MacGinnis 45-yard field goal, 1:06. Renegades 6–3. Drive: 12 plays, 69 yards, 6:04.

Fourth quarter

- LA – Nelson Spruce 6-yard pass from Josh Johnson (1-pt. failed), 11:57. Wildcats 9–6. Drive: 9 plays, 64 yards, 4:05.
- DAL – Cameron Artis-Payne 21-yard rush (1-pt. good), 9:00. Renegades 13–9. Drive: 6 plays, 68 yards, 2:58.
- DAL – Donald Parham 3-yard pass from Landry Jones (1-pt. failed), 5:02. Renegades 19–9. Drive: 5 plays, 25 yards, 2:14.
- LA – Nelson Spruce 44-yard pass from Josh Johnson (3-pt. good), 4:45. Renegades 19–18. Drive: 2 plays, 44 yards, 0:18.
- DAL – Cameron Artis-Payne 17-yard rush (1-pt. failed), 1:14. Renegades 25–18. Drive: 7 plays, 64 yards, 3:31.

Top passers

- DAL – Landry Jones – 28/40, 305 yards, TD, 2 INT
- LA – Josh Johnson – 18/34, 196 yards, 2 TD

Top rushers

- DAL – Cameron Artis-Payne – 14 carries, 99 yards, 2 TD
- LA – Elijah Hood – 10 carries, 31 yards

Top receivers

- DAL – Donald Parham – 5 receptions, 76 yards, TD
- LA – Nelson Spruce – 6 receptions, 89 yards, 2 TD

=== Week 3: at Seattle Dragons ===
Week 3 — Dallas at Seattle

Quarter	1	2	3	4	Total
Renegades	6	0	6	12	24
Dragons	6	6	0	0	12

at CenturyLink Field, Seattle, Washington

- Date: Saturday, February 22
- Game time: 2:00 p.m. PST/ 5:00 p.m. EST
- Game weather: Cloudy • Temperature: 49 °F (9 °C) • Wind: ENE 1 mph
- Game attendance: 22,060
- Referee: John O'Neill
- TV announcers (Fox): Curt Menefee (play-by-play), Joel Klatt (analyst), Brock Huard (sideline)

Game information

First quarter

- SEA – Austin Proehl 21-yard pass from Brandon Silvers (2-pt. failed), 7:23. Dragons 6–0. Drive: 10 plays, 57 yards, 5:10.
- DAL – Flynn Nagel 12-yard pass from Landry Jones (2-pt. failed), 0:48. Tied 6–6. Drive: 13 plays, 82 yards, 6:33.

Second quarter

- SEA – Kenneth Farrow 19-yard pass from Brandon Silvers (2-pt. failed), 1:31. Dragons 12–6. Drive: 8 plays, 71 yards, 3:35.

Third quarter

- DAL – Donald Parham 10-yard pass from Landry Jones (2-pt. failed), 3:53. Tied 12–12. Drive: 12 plays, 62 yards, 5:52.

Fourth quarter

- DAL – Austin MacGinnis 19-yard field goal, 12:45. Renegades 15–12. Drive: 10 plays, 54 yards, 4:19.
- DAL – Donald Parham 65-yard pass from Landry Jones (2-pt. failed), 8:58. Renegades 21–12. Drive: 3 plays, 66 yards, 1:24.
- DAL – Austin MacGinnis 33-yard field goal, 0:47. Renegades 24–12. Drive: 11 plays, 58 yards, 4:19.

Top passers

- DAL – Landry Jones – 30/41, 274 yards, 3 TD, 2 INT
- SEA – Brandon Silvers – 21/34, 204 yards, 2 TD, INT

Top rushers

- DAL – Cameron Artis-Payne – 13 carries, 80 yards
- SEA – Ja'Quan Gardner – 8 carries, 37 yards

Top receivers

- DAL – Donald Parham – 5 receptions, 101 yards, 2 TD
- SEA – Austin Proehl – 6 receptions, 81 yards, TD

=== Week 4: Houston Roughnecks ===
Week 4 — Houston at Dallas

Quarter	1	2	3	4	Total
Roughnecks	6	9	6	6	27
Renegades	0	11	9	0	20

at Globe Life Park in Arlington, Arlington, Texas

- Date: Sunday, March 1
- Game time: 3:00 p.m. CST
- Game weather: Partly cloudy • Temperature: 74 °F (23 °C) • Wind: S 17 mph
- Game attendance: 18,332
- Referee: Brandon Cruse
- TV announcers (FS1): Kevin Burkhardt (play-by-play), Greg Olsen (analyst)

Game information

First quarter

- HOU – Sergio Castillo 37-yard field goal, 8:49. Roughnecks 3–0. Drive: 5 plays, 29 yards, 2:17.
- HOU – Sergio Castillo 30-yard field goal, 2:31. Roughnecks 6–0. Drive: 7 plays, 38 yards, 3:32.

Second quarter

- HOU – Nick Holley 6-yard pass from Phillip Walker (3-pt. good), 14:05. Roughnecks 15–0. Drive: 5 plays, 40 yards, 2:08.
- DAL – Donald Parham 12-yard pass from Landry Jones (2-pt. good), 11:37. Roughnecks 15–8. Drive: 6 plays, 45 yards, 2:30.
- DAL – Austin MacGinnis 46-yard field goal, 0:55. Roughnecks 15–11. Drive: 10 plays, 32 yards, 2:17.

Third quarter

- HOU – Blake Jackson 19-yard pass from Phillip Walker (3-pt. failed), 5:23. Roughnecks 21–11. Drive: 8 plays, 84 yards, 4:16.
- DAL – Lance Dunbar 1-yard rush (3-pt. good), 0:42. Roughnecks 21–20. Drive: 9 plays, 79 yards, 4:39.

Fourth quarter

- HOU – Edmond Robinson 12-yard fumble return (2-pt. failed), 11:48. Roughnecks 27–20.

Top passers

- HOU – Phillip Walker – 25/41, 239 yards, 2 TD, INT
- DAL – Landry Jones – 25/38, 205 yards, TD, 3 INT

Top rushers

- HOU – James Butler – 11 carries, 39 yards
- DAL – Lance Dunbar – 9 carries, 48 yards, TD

Top receivers

- HOU – Nick Holley – 8 receptions, 97 yards, TD
- DAL – Flynn Nagel – 6 receptions, 76 yards

=== Week 5: New York Guardians ===
Week 5 — New York at Dallas

Quarter	1	2	3	4	Total
Guardians	3	3	21	3	30
Renegades	3	3	6	0	12

at Globe Life Park in Arlington, Arlington, Texas

- Date: Saturday, March 7
- Game time: 4:00 p.m. CST / 5:00 p.m. EST
- Game attendance: 15,950
- Referee: Jeff Heaser
- TV announcers (FOX): Curt Menefee (play-by-play), Joel Klatt (analyst), Cam Jordan (sideline)

Game information

First quarter

- DAL – Austin MacGinnis 23-yard field goal, 9:32. Renegades 3–0. Drive: 12 plays, 62 yards, 5:32.
- NY – Matt McCrane 46-yard field goal, 6:43. Tied 3–3. Drive: 5 plays, 12 yards, 2:51.

Second quarter

- NY – Matt McCrane 39-yard field goal, 8:37. Guardians 6–3. Drive: 12 plays, 49 yards, 6:19.
- DAL – Austin MacGinnis 36-yard field goal, 0:06. Tied 6-6. Drive: 9 plays, 44 yards, 1:25.

Third quarter

- NY – Marquise Williams 1-yard rush (2-pt. failed), 10:57. Guardians 12-6. Drive: 8 plays, 76 yards, 4:07.
- NY – Colby Pearson 80-yard pass from Luis Perez (2-pt. good), 3:31. Guardians 20-6. Drive: 1 play, 80 yards, 0:14.
- NY – Ryan Mueller 33-yard interception return (1-pt. good), 02:48. Guardians 27-6.
- DAL – Austin Walter 97-yard kickoff return (3-pt. failed), 02:38. Guardians 27-12.

Fourth quarter

- NY – Matt McCrane 26-yard field goal, 8:51. Guardians 30–12. Drive: 9 plays, 27 yards, 5:18.

Top passers

- NY – Luis Perez – 16/30, 229 yards, 1 TD, 1 INT
- DAL – Philip Nelson – 28/49, 210, 2 INT

Top rushers

- NY – Darius Victor – 15 carries, 58 yards
- DAL – Cameron Artis-Payne – 6 carries, 25 yards

Top receivers

- NY – Colby Pearson – 5 receptions, 95 yards, 1 TD
- DAL – Flynn Nagel – 7 receptions, 46 yards

With the loss, the Renegades finished their season 2-3 (0-3 at home). The remainder of their games were canceled due to the COVID-19 pandemic.
