= 2020 Houston Roughnecks season =

American professional football season

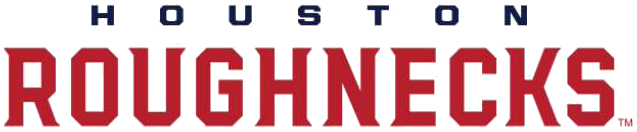
- Owner: Alpha Entertainment, LLC
- General manager: June Jones
- Head coach: June Jones
- Home stadium: TDECU Stadium

Results
- Record: 5–0
- League place: 1st XFL West

The 2020 Houston Roughnecks season was the first season for the Houston Roughnecks as a professional American football franchise. They played as charter members of the XFL, one of eight teams to compete in the league for the 2020 season. The Roughnecks played their home games at TDECU Stadium and were led by head coach June Jones.

Their inaugural season was cut short due to the COVID-19 pandemic and the XFL officially suspended operations for the remainder of the season on March 20, 2020.

== Standings ==
2020 XFL standings
East Division
Team	W	L	PCT	TD+/-	TD+	TD-	DIV	PF	PA	DIFF	STK
DC Defenders	3	2	.600	-3	9	12	2–1	82	89	-7	W1
St. Louis BattleHawks	3	2	.600	3	11	8	1–1	97	77	20	L1
New York Guardians	3	2	.600	-1	8	9	1–2	79	85	-6	W2
Tampa Bay Vipers	1	4	.200	-4	11	15	1–1	98	115	-17	L1
West Division
Team	W	L	PCT	TD+/-	TD+	TD-	DIV	PF	PA	DIFF	STK
Houston Roughnecks	5	0	1.000	7	21	14	3–0	158	111	47	W5
Dallas Renegades	2	3	.400	-3	9	12	2–1	90	102	-12	L2
Los Angeles Wildcats	2	3	.400	4	18	14	0–2	129	122	7	W1
Seattle Dragons	1	4	.200	-3	12	15	0–2	87	119	-32	L3
(x)–clinched playoff berth; (y)–clinched conference; (e)–eliminated from playoff contention

== Schedule ==
All times Central

Week	Day	Date	Kickoff	TV	Opponent	Results		Location
Week	Day	Date	Kickoff	TV	Opponent	Score	Record	Location
1	Saturday	February 8	4:00 p.m.	Fox	Los Angeles Wildcats	W 37–17	1–0	TDECU Stadium
2	Sunday	February 16	5:00 p.m.	FS1	St. Louis BattleHawks	W 28–24	2–0	TDECU Stadium
3	Saturday	February 22	1:00 p.m.	ABC	at Tampa Bay Vipers	W 34–27	3–0	Raymond James Stadium
4	Sunday	March 1	3:00 p.m.	FS1	at Dallas Renegades	W 27–20	4–0	Globe Life Park in Arlington
5	Saturday	March 7	1:00 p.m.	ABC	Seattle Dragons	W 32–23	5–0	TDECU Stadium
6	Saturday	March 14	1:00 p.m.	ABC	at New York Guardians	Not played		MetLife Stadium
7	Sunday	March 22	5:00 p.m.	FS1	DC Defenders	Not played		TDECU Stadium
8	Sunday	March 29	2:00 p.m.	ABC	at Los Angeles Wildcats	Not played		Dignity Health Sports Park
9	Thursday	April 2	7:00 p.m.	Fox	Dallas Renegades	Not played		TDECU Stadium
10	Saturday	April 11	1:00 p.m.	ABC	at Seattle Dragons	Not played		CenturyLink Field

== Final roster ==
2020 Houston Roughnecks final roster
Quarterbacks: 18 Connor Cook; 4 Marcus McDade; 11 P. J. Walker; Running backs: 28 James Butler; 29 De'Angelo Henderson; 44 Andre Williams; 36 Marquez Williams; Wide receivers: 13 Ray Bolden; 10 Sammie Coates; 33 Nick Holley; 17 Blake Jackson; 2 Taivon Jacobs; 1 Kahlil Lewis; 15 Ryheem Malone; 3 Sam Mobley; 14 Cam Phillips	Offensive linemen: 70 Ryan Anderson G; 76 Juwann Bushell-Beatty T; 78 Nick Callender T; 69 Isame Faciane G; 74 Avery Gennesy G; 56 Tejan Koroma C; 79 Terry Poole T; 65 Demetrius Rhaney C; 73 Sebastian Tretola G; 66 Marquez Tucker T; Defensive linemen: 93 Corey Crawford DE; 94 Kony Ealy DE; 95 Greg Gilmore DE; 98 Nick James NT; 91 Caushaud Lyons DE; 90 Johnny Maxey DE; 96 Walter Palmore NT; 97 Gabe Wright NT	Linebackers: 43 Carl Bradford ILB; 42 Beniquez Brown ILB; 50 Kaelin Burnett OLB; 47 DeMarquis Gates ILB; 53 Drew Lewis OLB; 54 LaTroy Lewis OLB; 59 Vantrel McMillan OLB; 52 Brian Peters OLB; 51 Edmond Robinson OLB; 40 Ty Schwab ILB; Defensive backs: 22 Corrion Ballard SS; 25 Cody Brown FS; 27 Ajene Harris CB; 20 Marqueston Huff FS; 21 Charles James CB; 41 Jeremiah Johnson CB; 32 Deatrick Nichols SS; 30 Deji Olatoye CB; 26 Saivion Smith CB; Special teams: 7 Sergio Castillo K; 5 Austin Rehkow P; 58 Colton Taylor LS	Reserve lists: -- Trae Elston S (IR); -- Steve McShane RB (IR); 77 Kelvin Palmer OT (IR); -- Jalen Saunders WR (IR); -- Hunter Sharp WR (IR); -- David Simmons CB (IR); -- Aaron Tiller DE (IR); 56 active, 7 inactive

== Staff ==
2020 Houston Roughnecks staff
Front office: President – Brian Michael Cooper; Director of Player Personnel – Randy Mueller; Director of Football Operations – Dynomite Kuhn; Head coaches: Head Coach / General Manager – June Jones; Offensive coaches: Offensive Coordinator – Chris Miller; Quarterbacks – Dan Morrison; Running backs – Wes Suan; Wide Receivers – AJ Smith; Offensive Line – John Estes	Defensive coaches: Defensive Coordinator – Ted Cottrell; Linebackers – Tom Mason; Defensive backs – Derrius Bell; Special teams coaches: Special Teams Coordinator – Dennis McKnight

== Game summaries ==
=== Week 1: vs. Los Angeles Wildcats ===
Week 1 — Los Angeles Wildcats at Houston Roughnecks

Quarter	1	2	3	4	Total
Wildcats	8	9	0	0	17
Roughnecks	6	12	8	11	37

at TDECU Stadium, Houston, Texas

- Date: Saturday, February 8
- Game time: 4:00 p.m. CST
- Game weather: Partly cloudy • Temperature: 70 °F (21 °C) • Wind: ESE 10 mph
- Game attendance: 17,815
- Referee: Brandon Cruse
- TV announcers (Fox, TUDN): Curt Menefee (play-by-play), Joel Klatt (analyst), Brock Huard (sideline)

Game information

First quarter

- HOU – Cam Phillips 50-yard pass from Phillip Walker (1-pt. failed), 13:44. Roughnecks 6–0. Drive: 3 plays, 61 yards, 1:23.
- LA – Chad Kanoff 5-yard run (2-pt. good), 7:49. Wildcats 8–6. Drive: 11 plays, 71 yards, 5:58.

Second quarter

- LA – Jordan Smallwood 11-yard pass from Chad Kanoff (2-pt. failed), 9:26. Wildcats 14–6. Drive: 6 plays, 59 yards, 2:18.
- HOU – James Butler 16-yard pass from Phillip Walker (2-pt. failed), 7:22. Wildcats 14–12. Drive: 5 plays, 73 yards, 2:06.
- LA – Nick Novak 35-yard field goal, 1:30. Wildcats 17–12. Drive: 14 plays, 55 yards, 5:49.
- HOU – Sam Mobley 39-yard pass from Phillip Walker (2-pt. failed), 1:10. Roughnecks 18–17. Drive: 2 plays, 39 yards, 0:23.

Third quarter

- HOU – Kahlil Lewis 4-yard pass from Phillip Walker (2-pt. good), 9:04. Roughnecks 26–17. Drive: 7 plays, 48 yards, 3:46.

Fourth quarter

- HOU – Sergio Castillo 44-yard field goal, 14:26. Roughnecks 29–17. Drive: 9 plays, 38 yards, 4:05.
- HOU – James Butler 4-yard run (2-pt. good), 10:01. Roughnecks 37–17. Drive: 6 plays, 42 yards, 2:44.

Top passers

- LA – Chad Kanoff – 21/40, 214 yards, TD, INT
- HOU – Phillip Walker – 23/39, 272 yards, 4 TD, INT

Top rushers

- LA – Elijah Hood – 12 carries, 43 yards
- HOU – James Butler – 9 carries, 30 yards, TD

Top receivers

- LA – Nelson Spruce – 11 receptions, 103 yards
- HOU – Cam Phillips – 4 receptions, 67 yards, TD

The Roughnecks were the only Western Conference team to win in week 1 as they started their season 1–0.

=== Week 2: vs. St. Louis BattleHawks ===
Week 2 — St. Louis BattleHawks at Houston Roughnecks

Quarter	1	2	3	4	Total
BattleHawks	6	0	12	6	24
Roughnecks	9	12	0	7	28

at TDECU Stadium, Houston, Texas

- Date: Saturday, February 15
- Game time: 6:00 p.m. CST
- Game weather: Partly cloudy • Temperature: 66 °F (19 °C) • Wind: SSE 6 mph
- Game attendance: 17,103
- Referee: Jeff Heaser
- TV announcers (FS1): Kevin Burkhardt (play-by-play), Greg Olsen (analyst)

Game information

First quarter

- HOU – Sergio Castillo 44-yard field goal, 11:06. Roughnecks 3–0. Drive: 9 plays, 32 yards, 3:59.
- STL – Matt Jones 25-yard pass from Jordan Ta'amu (2-pt. failed), 6:30. BattleHawks 6–3. Drive: 9 yards, 71 yards, 4:40.
- HOU – Cam Phillips 7-yard pass from Phillip Walker (2-pt. failed), 3:21. Roughnecks 9–6. Drive: 6 plays, 66 yards, 3:07.

Second quarter

- HOU – James Butler 1-yard rush (2-pt. failed), 9:57. Roughnecks 15–6. Drive: 1 play, 1 yard, 0:05.
- HOU – Cam Phillips 9-yard pass from Phillip Walker (1-pt. failed), Roughnecks 21–6, 1:59. Drive: 7 plays, 68 yards, 3:30.

Third quarter

- STL – De'Mornay Pierson-El 1-yard pass from Jordan Ta'amu (2-pt. failed), 9:00. Roughnecks 21–12. Drive: 13 plays, 72 yards, 6:04.
- STL – Jordan Ta'amu 4-yard rush (1-pt. failed), 1:34. Roughnecks 21–18. Drive: 13 plays, 60 yards, 5:18.

Fourth quarter

- HOU – Cam Phillips 2-yard pass to Phillip Walker (1-pt. good), 9:36. Roughnecks 28–18. Drive: 3 plays, 6 yards, 0:59.
- STL – L'Damian Washington 36-yard pass from Jordan Ta'amu (1-pt. failed), 1:50. Roughnecks 28–24. Drive: 9 plays, 65 yards, 3:45.

Top passers

- STL – Jordan Ta'amu – 30/37, 284 yards, 3 TD, 2 INT
- HOU – Phillip Walker – 20/31, 170 yards, 3 TD

Top rushers

- STL – Matt Jones – 16 carries, 44 yards
- HOU – James Butler – 7 carries, 28 yards, 1 TD

Top receivers

- STL – L'Damian Washington – 6 receptions, 77 yards, 1 TD
- HOU – Cam Phillips – 8 receptions, 63 yards, 3 TD

=== Week 3: at Tampa Bay Vipers ===
Week 3 — Houston Roughnecks at Tampa Bay Vipers

Quarter	1	2	3	4	Total
Roughnecks	9	9	8	8	34
Vipers	3	15	6	3	27

at Raymond James Stadium, Tampa Bay, FL

- Date: Saturday, February 22
- Game time: 1:00 p.m. CST / 2:00 p.m. EST
- Game weather: Cloudy • Temperature: 69 °F (21 °C) • Wind: ENE 13 mph
- Game attendance: 18,117
- Referee: James Carter
- TV announcers (ABC): Steve Levy (play-by-play), Greg McElroy (analyst), Tom Luginbill and Dianna Russini (sideline)

Game information

First quarter

- TB – Andrew Franks 48-yard field goal, 12:34. Vipers 3–0. Drive: 7 plays, 29 yards, 2:26.
- HOU – Cam Phillips 84-yard pass from Phillip Walker (3-pt. good), 3:49. Roughnecks 9–3. Drive: 1 play, 84 yards, 0:13.

Second quarter

- TB – Quinton Flowers 7-yard rush (1-pt. good), 9:17. Vipers 10–9. Drive: 7 plays, 58 yards, 2:51.
- HOU – Phillip Walker 8-yard rush (3-pt. failed), 5:06. Roughnecks 15–10. Drive: 8 plays, 76 yards, 4:12.
- HOU – Sergio Castillo 28-yard field goal, 1:00. Roughnecks 18–10. Drive: 7 plays, 49 yards, 2:17.
- TB – Taylor Cornelius 1-yard rush (2-pt. good), 0:03. Tied 18–18. Drive: 6 plays, 59 yards, 0:56.

Third quarter

- HOU – Cam Phillips 24-yard pass from Phillip Walker (2-pt. good), 12:13. Roughnecks 26–18. Drive: 5 plays, 80 yards, 2:27.
- TB – Daniel Williams 20-yard pass from Taylor Cornelius (2-pt. failed), 2:13. Roughnecks 26–24. Drive: 8 plays, 61 yards, 3:45.

Fourth quarter

- TB – Andrew Franks 43-yard field goal, 12:51. Vipers 27–26. Drive: 6 plays, 23 yards, 2:06.
- HOU – Cam Phillips 17 yard pass from Phillip Walker (2-pt. good), 10:31. Roughnecks 34–27. Drive: 5 plays, 63 yards, 2:24.

Top passers

- HOU – Phillip Walker – 24/36, 306 yards, 3 TD
- TB – Taylor Cornelius – 16/31, 193 yards, TD, INT

Top rushers

- HOU – James Butler – 7 carries, 72 yards
- TB – De'Veon Smith – 15 carries, 49 yards

Top receivers

- HOU – Cam Phillips – 8 receptions, 194 yards, 3 TD
- TB – Jalen Tolliver – 8 receptions, 104 yards

=== Week 4: at Dallas Renegades ===
Week 4 — Houston Roughnecks at Dallas Renegades

Quarter	1	2	3	4	Total
Roughnecks	6	9	6	6	27
Renegades	0	11	9	0	20

at Globe Life Park in Arlington, Arlington, Texas

- Date: Sunday, March 1
- Game time: 3:00 p.m. CST
- Game weather: Partly cloudy • Temperature: 74 °F (23 °C) • Wind: S 17 mph
- Game attendance: 18,332
- Referee: Brandon Cruse
- TV announcers (FS1): Kevin Burkhardt (play-by-play), Greg Olsen (analyst), and Jenny Taft (sideline reporter)

Game information

First quarter

- HOU – Sergio Castillo 37-yard field goal, 8:49. Roughnecks 3–0. Drive: 5 plays, 29 yards, 2:17.
- HOU – Sergio Castillo 30-yard field goal, 2:31. Roughnecks 6–0. Drive: 7 plays, 38 yards, 3:32.

Second quarter

- HOU – Nick Holley 6-yard pass from Phillip Walker (3-pt. good), 14:05. Roughnecks 15–0. Drive: 5 plays, 40 yards, 2:08.
- DAL – Donald Parham 12-yard pass from Landry Jones (2-pt. good), 11:37. Roughnecks 15–8. Drive: 6 plays, 45 yards, 2:30.
- DAL – Austin MacGinnis 46-yard field goal, 0:55. Roughnecks 15–11. Drive: 10 plays, 32 yards, 2:17.

Third quarter

- HOU – Blake Jackson 19-yard pass from Phillip Walker (3-pt. failed), 5:23. Roughnecks 21–11. Drive: 8 plays, 84 yards, 4:16.
- DAL – Lance Dunbar 1-yard rush (3-pt. good), 0:42. Roughnecks 21–20. Drive: 9 plays, 79 yards, 4:39.

Fourth quarter

- HOU – Edmond Robinson 12-yard fumble return (2-pt. failed), 11:48. Roughnecks 27–20.

Top passers

- HOU – Phillip Walker – 25/41, 239 yards, 2 TD, INT
- DAL – Landry Jones – 25/38, 205 yards, TD, 3 INT

Top rushers

- HOU – James Butler – 11 carries, 39 yards
- DAL – Lance Dunbar – 9 carries, 48 yards, TD

Top receivers

- HOU – Nick Holley – 8 receptions, 97 yards, TD
- DAL – Flynn Nagel – 6 receptions, 76 yards

=== Week 5: Seattle Dragons ===
Week 5 — Seattle at Houston

Quarter	1	2	3	4	Total
Dragons	6	8	9	0	23
Roughnecks	0	14	6	12	32

at TDECU Stadium, Houston, Texas

- Date: Saturday, March 7
- Game time: 1:00 p.m. CST / 2:00 p.m. EST
- Game weather: Partly cloudy • Temperature: 59 °F (15 °C) • Wind: NNE 5 mph
- Game attendance: 19,773
- Referee: Tra Blake
- TV announcers (ABC): Steve Levy (play-by-play), Greg McElroy (analyst), Tom Luginbill and Dianna Russini (sideline)

Game information

First quarter

- SEA – B. J. Daniels 1-yard rush (2-pt. failed), 3:29. Dragons 6–0. Drive: 7 plays, 18 yards, 3:18.

Second quarter

- SEA – Trey Williams 17-yard rush (2-pt. good), 9:29. Dragons 14–0. Drive: 8 plays, 54 yards, 3:59.
- HOU – Nick Holley 50-yard pass from Phillip Walker (3-pt. failed), 6:26. Dragons 14–6. Drive: 5 plays, 80 yards, 3:04.
- HOU – James Butler 1-yard rush (2-pt. good), Tied 14–14. Drive: 8 plays, 90 yards, 2:20.

Third quarter

- SEA – Ernesto Lacayo 47-yard field goal, 10:51. Dragons 17–14. Drive: 10 plays, 40 yards, 4:12.
- SEA – B. J. Daniels 1-yard rush (2-pt. failed), 9:01. Dragons 23–14. Drive: 1 play, 1 yard, 0:05.
- HOU – James Butler 8-yard rush (3-pt. failed), 7:03. Dragons 23–20. Drive: 4 plays, 64 yards, 1:58.

Fourth quarter

- HOU – Cam Phillips 5-yard pass from Phillip Walker (2-pt. failed), 9:08. Roughnecks 26–23. Drive: 12 plays, 64 yards, 5:46.
- HOU – Cam Phillips 11-yard pass from Phillip Walker (1-pt. failed), 3:36. Roughnecks 32–23. Drive: 8 plays, 66 yards, 3:42.

Top passers

- SEA – B. J. Daniels – 14/22, 114 yards
- HOU – Phillip Walker – 27/38, 351 yards, 3 TD, 2 INT

Top rushers

- SEA – B. J. Daniels – 10 carries, 30 yards, 2 TD
- HOU – Andre Williams – 10 receptions, 54 yards

Top receivers

- SEA – Austin Proehl – 3 receptions, 56 yards
- HOU – Cam Phillips – 10 receptions, 122 yards, 2 TD

With the win, the Roughnecks finished their season 5–0. The remainder of their games were canceled due to the COVID-19 pandemic.
