= 2020 DC Defenders season =

American professional football season

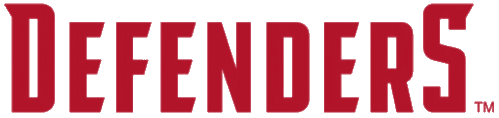
- Owner: Alpha Entertainment, LLC
- General manager: Pep Hamilton
- Head coach: Pep Hamilton
- Home stadium: Audi Field

Results
- Record: 3–2
- League place: Tie 1st XFL East

The 2020 DC Defenders season was the first season for the DC Defenders as a professional American football franchise. They were playing as charter members of the XFL, one of eight teams to compete in the league for the 2020 season. The Defenders played their home games at Audi Field and were led by head coach Pep Hamilton.

Their inaugural season was cut short due to the COVID-19 pandemic and the XFL officially suspended operations for the remainder of the season on March 20, 2020.

== Standings ==
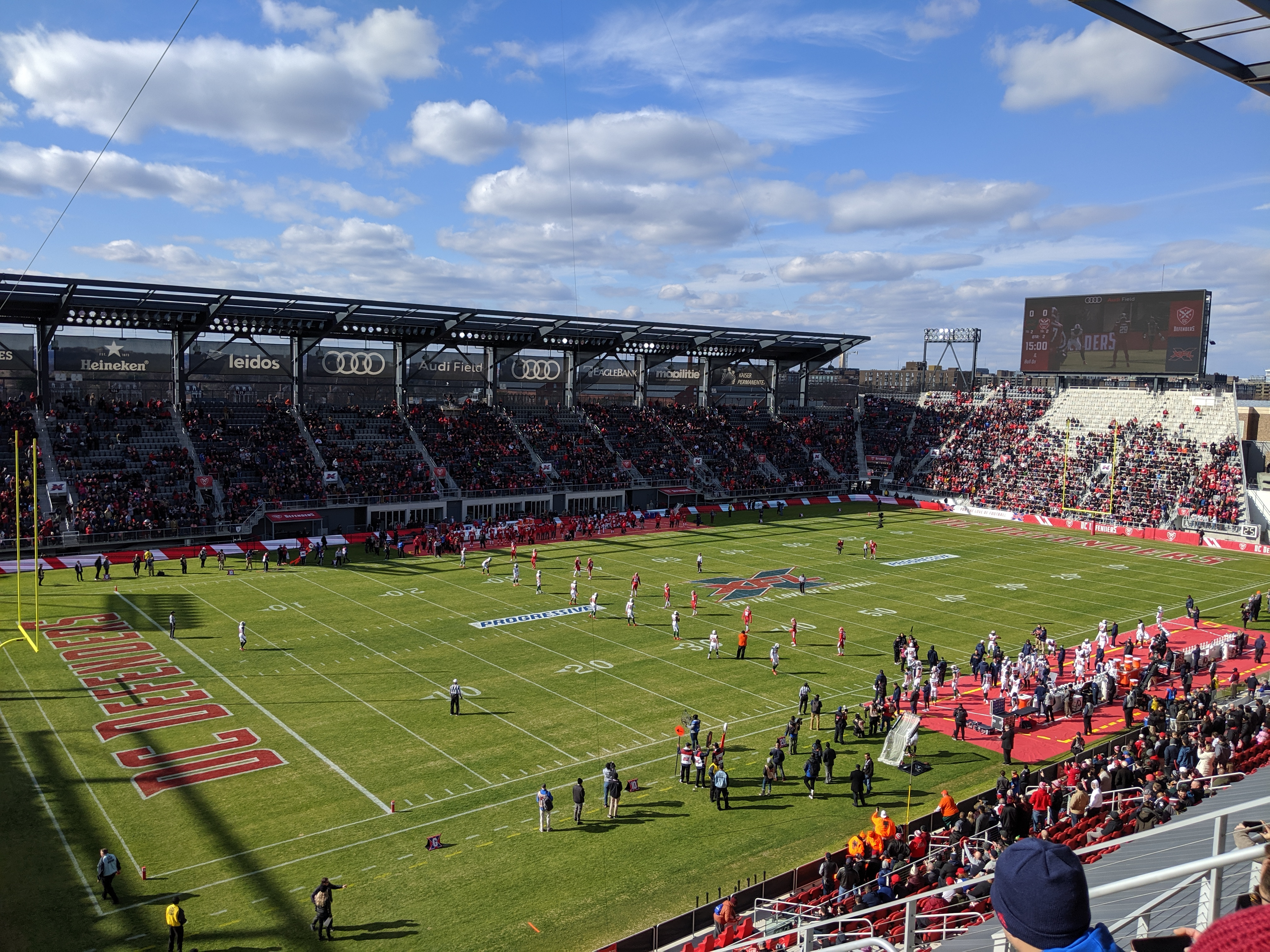
First ever XFL kickoff between the Defenders and Seattle Dragons at Audi Field

2020 XFL standings
East Division
Team	W	L	PCT	TD+/-	TD+	TD-	DIV	PF	PA	DIFF	STK
DC Defenders	3	2	.600	-3	9	12	2–1	82	89	-7	W1
St. Louis BattleHawks	3	2	.600	3	11	8	1–1	97	77	20	L1
New York Guardians	3	2	.600	-1	8	9	1–2	79	85	-6	W2
Tampa Bay Vipers	1	4	.200	-4	11	15	1–1	98	115	-17	L1
West Division
Team	W	L	PCT	TD+/-	TD+	TD-	DIV	PF	PA	DIFF	STK
Houston Roughnecks	5	0	1.000	7	21	14	3–0	158	111	47	W5
Dallas Renegades	2	3	.400	-3	9	12	2–1	90	102	-12	L2
Los Angeles Wildcats	2	3	.400	4	18	14	0–2	129	122	7	W1
Seattle Dragons	1	4	.200	-3	12	15	0–2	87	119	-32	L3
(x)–clinched playoff berth; (y)–clinched conference; (e)–eliminated from playoff contention

== Schedule ==
All times Eastern

Week	Day	Date	Kickoff	TV	Opponent	Results		Location
Week	Day	Date	Kickoff	TV	Opponent	Score	Record	Location
1	Saturday	February 8	2:00 p.m.	ABC	Seattle Dragons	W 31–19	1–0	Audi Field
2	Saturday	February 15	2:00 p.m.	ABC	New York Guardians	W 27–0	2–0	Audi Field
3	Sunday	February 23	6:00 p.m.	FS1	at Los Angeles Wildcats	L 9–39	2–1	Dignity Health Sports Park
4	Sunday	March 1	7:00 p.m.	ESPN2	at Tampa Bay Vipers	L 0–25	2–2	Raymond James Stadium
5	Sunday	March 8	3:00 p.m.	FS1	St. Louis BattleHawks	W 15–6	3–2	Audi Field
6	Sunday	March 15	4:00 p.m.	FS1	Dallas Renegades	Not played		Audi Field
7	Sunday	March 22	6:00 p.m.	FS1	at Houston Roughnecks	Not played		TDECU Stadium
8	Saturday	March 28	2:00 p.m.	ABC	Tampa Bay Vipers	Not played		Audi Field
9	Saturday	April 4	2:00 p.m.	ABC	at New York Guardians	Not played		MetLife Stadium
10	Sunday	April 12	2:00 p.m.	ABC	at St. Louis BattleHawks	Not played		The Dome at America's Center

== Final roster ==
2020 DC Defenders final roster
Quarterbacks: 11 C. J. Collins; 3 Tyree Jackson; 12 Cardale Jones; Running backs: 32 Khalid Abdullah; 31 Nick Brossette; 26 Jhurell Pressley; 24 Donnel Pumphrey; Wide receivers: 10 Simmie Cobbs; 19 Malachi Dupre; 5 Deion Holliman; 16 Tyler Palka; 4 Eli Rogers; 15 Rashad Ross; 9 Jalen Rowell; 1 DeAndre Thompkins; Tight ends: 80 Donnie Ernsberger; 85 Derrick Hayward; 86 Khari Lee	Offensive linemen: 69 Cole Boozer T; 75 Chris Brown G; 78 Malcolm Bunche T/G; 74 Rishard Cook G; 62 Randall Harris G; 70 Terronne Prescod G; 65 Bunchy Stallings G; 72 Logan Tuley-Tillman T; 79 De'Ondre Wesley T; Defensive linemen: 90 Peli Anau DE; 98 Daryle Banfield NT; 91 Tavaris Barnes DE; 95 Kenny Bigelow DE; 96 Jay Bromley DE; 97 Anthony Johnson DE; 92 Elijah Qualls NT; 93 Tracy Sprinkle DE; 94 Kalani Vakameilalo NT	Linebackers: 52 Jonathan Celestin ILB; 56 KeShun Freeman OLB; 54 Jonathan Massaquoi OLB; 99 Sam Montgomery OLB; 59 A. J. Tarpley ILB; 53 Jameer Thurman ILB; 58 Scooby Wright ILB; Defensive backs: 28 Elijah Campbell CB; 44 Reggie Cole CB; 21 Doran Grant CB; 37 Deion Harris CB; 23 Josh Jenkins CB; 29 Tyree Kinnel SS; 25 Des Lawrence CB; 20 Carlos Merritt FS; 45 Rahim Moore FS; 38 Shamarko Thomas SS; 27 Josh Thornton CB; Special teams: 42 Brian Khoury LS; 7 Hunter Niswander P; 2 Tyler Rausa K	Reserve lists: 77 James O'Hagan C (IR); 64 Jon Toth C (IR); 57 active, 2 inactive

== Staff ==
2020 DC Defenders staff
Front office: President – Erik Moses; Director of player personnel – Greg Gabriel; Manager of Football Operations/Scout – Jeff Bauer; Head coaches: Head coach/general manager – Pep Hamilton; Assistant – Brent Battle; Offensive coaches: Offensive coordinator/Running backs – Tanner Engstrand; Quarterbacks – Ted White; Receivers – Bob Saunders; Run game coordinator/Offensive line/Tight ends – Chris Scelfo	Defensive coaches: Defensive coordinator/Secondary – Louie Cioffi; Defensive line – Ray Hamilton; Linebackers – Kurt Gouveia; Defensive assistant – Mike Gillhamer; Special teams coaches: Special teams coordinator/Cornerbacks – Steve Wilson

== Season summary ==
During the first two weeks of the XFL season, the Defenders got off to a hot start, beating the Seattle Dragons in the first XFL game by a score of 31–19 at home, and dominating the New York Guardians at home 27–0. However, Cardale Jones and the Defenders got into a slump the next two weeks, falling to 2-2 and losing back to back games on the road; first to the Los Angeles Wildcats 39–9, and then to the Tampa Bay Vipers 25–0. The Defenders were able to rebound in week 5 thanks to Tyree Jackson, winning against the St. Louis Battlehawks at home 15-6 and improving their record to 3-2 before the XFL officially suspended operations 12 days later.

== Game summaries ==
=== Week 1: vs. Seattle Dragons ===
Week 1 — Seattle at DC

Quarter	1	2	3	4	Total
Dragons	6	7	6	0	19
Defenders	3	9	13	6	31

at Audi Field, Washington, D.C.

- Date: Saturday, February 8
- Game time: 2:00 p.m. EST
- Game weather: Cloudy • Temperature: 43 °F (6 °C) • Wind: SW 7 mph
- Game attendance: 17,163
- Referee: Reggie Smith
- TV announcers (ABC): Steve Levy (play-by-play), Greg McElroy (analyst), Tom Luginbill and Dianna Russini (sideline)

Game information

First quarter

- DC – Tyler Rausa 34-yard field goal, 7:20. Defenders 3–0. Drive: 13 plays, 63 yards, 5:49.
- SEA – Austin Proehl 14-yard pass from Brandon Silvers (1-pt. failed), 4:25. Dragons 6–3. Drive: 6 plays, 67 yards, 2:55.

Second quarter

- DC – Jonathan Celestin recovered blocked punt in end zone (2-pt. failed), 6:56. Defenders 9–6
- SEA – Brandon Silvers 13-yard pass to Trey Williams (1-pt. good), 0:20. Dragons 13–9. Drive: 9 plays, 60 yards, 2:11.
- DC – Tyler Rausa 54-yard field goal, 0:00. Dragons 13–12. Drive: 4 plays, 8 yards, 0:20.

Third quarter

- DC – Khari Lee 39-yard pass from Cardale Jones (1-pt. good), 12:07. Defenders 19–13. Drive: 6 plays, 78 yards, 3:04.
- SEA – Austin Proehl 57-yard pass from Brandon Silvers (1-pt. failed), 10:42. Tied 19–19. Drive: 3 plays, 67 yards, 1:28.
- DC – Rashad Ross 31-yard pass from Cardale Jones (1-pt. failed), 1:45. Defenders 25–19. Drive: 5 plays, 55 yards, 2:35.

Fourth quarter

- DC – Bradley Sylve 69-yard interception return (1-pt. failed), 12:55. Defenders 31–19.

Top passers

- SEA – Brandon Silvers – 21/40, 217 yards, 3 TD, 2 INT
- DC – Cardale Jones – 16/26, 291 yards, 2 TD

Top rushers

- SEA – Kenneth Farrow – 7 carries, 41 yards
- DC – Cardale Jones – 6 carries, 33 yards

Top receivers

- SEA – Austin Proehl – 5 receptions, 88 yards, 2 TD
- DC – Eli Rogers – 6 receptions, 73 yards

This was the first-ever XFL game, and the Defenders would have the first score (although Seattle had the first touchdown) and the first win of the XFL.

=== Week 2: vs. New York Guardians ===
Week 2 — New York at DC

Quarter	1	2	3	4	Total
Guardians	0	0	0	0	0
Defenders	6	6	6	9	27

at Audi Field, Washington, D.C.

- Date: Saturday, February 15
- Game time: 2:00 p.m. EST
- Game weather: Partly cloudy • Temperature: 36 °F (2 °C) • Wind: S 9 mph
- Game attendance: 15,031
- Referee: John O'Neill
- TV announcers (ABC): Steve Levy (play-by-play), Greg McElroy (analyst), Tom Luginbill and Dianna Russini (sideline)

Game information

First quarter

- DC – DeAndre Thompkins 13-yard pass from Cardale Jones (1-pt. failed), 7:09. Defenders 6–0. Drive: 11 plays, 80 yards, 6:09.

Second quarter

- DC – Tyler Rausa 27-yard field goal, 11:19. Defenders 9–0. Drive: 13 plays, 51 yards, 7:31.
- DC – Tyler Rausa 36-yard field goal, 0:30. Defenders 12–0. Drive: 5 plays, 43 yards, 0:49.

Third quarter

- DC – Jameer Thurman 46-yard interception return (1-pt. failed), 10:07. Defenders 18–0.

Fourth quarter

- DC – Tyler Rausa 26-yard field goal, 7:22. Defenders 21–0. Drive: 13 plays, 54 yards, 7:28.
- DC – Derrick Hayward 6-yard pass from Cardale Jones (3-pt. failed), 1:29. Defenders 27–0. Drive: 5 plays, 49 yards, 1:57.

Top passers

- NY – Marquise Williams – 4/8, 51 yards
- DC – Cardale Jones – 23/37, 276 yards, 2 TD, INT

Top rushers

- NY – Tim Cook III – 10 rushes, 39 yards
- DC – Donnel Pumphrey – 12 rushes, 53 yards

Top receivers

- NY – Mekale McKay – 3 receptions, 30 yards
- DC – Rashad Ross – 4 receptions, 95 yards

In the fourth quarter, the Defenders tried for a three-point conversion, the first three-point attempt in the XFL.

=== Week 3: at Los Angeles Wildcats ===
Week 3 – DC at Los Angeles

Quarter	1	2	3	4	Total
Defenders	0	3	0	6	9
Wildcats	6	21	6	6	39

at Dignity Health Sports Park, Los Angeles, CA

- Date: Sunday, February 23
- Game time: 6:00 p.m. EST / 3:00 p.m. PST
- Game weather: Sunny • Temperature: 65 °F (18 °C) • Wind: N 3 mph
- Referee: Tra Blake
- TV announcers (FS1): Curt Menefee (play-by-play), Greg Olsen (analyst), Jenny Taft (sideline)

Game information

First quarter

- LA – Tre McBride 40-yard pass from Josh Johnson (2-pt. failed), 12:27. Wildcats 6–0. Drive: 5 plays, 71 yards, 2:50.

Second quarter

- LA – Larry Rose 1-yard rush (2-pt. good), 14:24. Wildcats 14–0. Drive: 5 plays, 28 yards, 2:20.
- LA – Tre McBride 28-yard pass from Josh Johnson (1-pt. failed), 8:47. Wildcats 20–0. Drive: 7 plays, 42 yards, 3:19.
- LA – Martez Carter 1-yard rush (1-pt. good), 4:48. Wildcats 27–0. Drive: 2 plays, 4 yards, 0:32.
- DC – Tyler Rausa 32-yard field goal, 0:30. Wildcats 27–3. Drive: 7 plays, 34 yards, 0:56.

Third quarter

- LA – Martez Carter 18-yard pass from Josh Johnson (1-pt. failed), 6:45. Wildcats 33–3. Drive: 7 plays, 96 yards, 2:47.

Fourth quarter

- LA – Martez Carter 20-yard rush (1-pt. failed), 11:39. Wildcats 39–3. Drive: 7 plays, 94 yards, 3:45.
- DC – Nick Brosette 38-yard rush (3-pt. failed), 7:33. Wildcats 39–9. Drive: 8 plays, 70 yards, 4:08.

Top passers

- DC – Cardale Jones – 13/26, 103 yards, 4 INT
- LA – Josh Johnson – 18/25, 278 yards, 3 TD

Top rushers

- DC – Nick Brosette – 8 carries, 75 yards, TD
- LA – Martez Carter – 11 carries, 34 yards, 2 TD

Top receivers

- DC – Khari Lee – 3 receptions, 38 yards
- LA – Tre McBride – 5 receptions, 109 yards, 2 TD

=== Week 4: at Tampa Bay Vipers ===
Week 4 — DC at Tampa Bay

Quarter	1	2	3	4	Total
Defenders	0	0	0	0	0
Vipers	7	9	6	3	25

at Raymond James Stadium, Tampa, Florida

- Date: Sunday, March 1
- Game time: 7:00 p.m. EST
- Game weather: Mostly cloudy • Temperature: 60 °F (16 °C) • Wind: NNE 3 mph
- Referee: Jeff Heaser
- TV announcers (ESPN2): Tom Hart (play-by-play), Joey Galloway (analyst), Pat McAfee (sideline)

Game information

First quarter

- TB – Jacques Patrick 8-yard rush (1-pt. good), 8:43. Vipers 7–0. Drive: 11 plays, 75 yards, 4:29.

Second quarter

- TB – DeAndre Goolsby 13-yard pass from Taylor Cornelius (1-pt. failed), 13:41. Vipers 13–0. Drive: 15 plays, 75 yards, 6:48.
- TB – Andrew Franks 40–yard field goal, 3:45. Vipers 16–0. Drive: 9 plays, 47 yards, 4:46.

Third quarter

- TB – Taylor Cornelius 17-yard rush (2-pt. failed), 4:36. Vipers 22–0. Drive: 3 plays, 23 yards, 1:05.

Fourth quarter

- TB – Andrew Franks 26-yard field goal, 10:17. Vipers 25–0. Drive: 17 plays, 71 yards, 7:22.

Top passers

- DC – Cardale Jones – 9/22, 72 yards, INT
- TB – Taylor Cornelius – 24/31, 211 yards, TD, INT

Top rushers

- DC – Donnel Pumphrey – 7 carries, 34 yards
- TB – De'Veon Smith – 24 carries, 122 yards

Top receivers

- DC – Donnel Pumphrey – 3 receptions, 32 yards
- TB – Daniel Williams – 7 receptions, 72 yards

=== Week 5: vs. St. Louis BattleHawks ===
Week 5 — St. Louis at DC

Quarter	1	2	3	4	Total
BattleHawks	3	3	0	0	6
Defenders	6	0	6	3	15

at Audi Field, Washington, D.C.

- Date: Sunday, March 8
- Game time: 5:00 p.m. EST
- Referee: John O'Neill
- TV announcers (FS1): Kevin Burkhardt (play-by-play), Greg Olsen (analyst)

Game information

First quarter

- STL - Taylor Russolino 35-yard field goal, 3:11. BattleHawks 3–0. Drive: 11 plays, 53 yards, 5:21.
- DC - Khari Lee 9-yard pass from Tyree Jackson (1-pt. failed), 1:02. Defenders 6–3. Drive: 5 plays, 45 yards, 2:09.

Second quarter

- STL - Taylor Russolino 40-yard field goal, 9:53. Tied 6–6. Drive: 13 plays, 63 yards, 6:08.

Third quarter

- DC – Tyler Rausa 52-yard field goal, 10:14. Defenders 9–6. Drive: 5 plays, 26 yards, 2:46.
- DC – Tyler Rausa 50-yard field goal, 3:25. Defenders 12–6. Drive: 7 plays, 39 yards, 3:21.

Fourth quarter

- DC – Tyler Rausa 22-yard field goal, 3:36. Defenders 15–6. Drive: 4 plays, 0 yards, 1:55.

Top passers

- STL – Jordan Ta'amu – 15/25, 174 yards
- DC – Tyree Jackson – 9/14, 39 yards, TD

Top rushers

- STL – Matt Jones – 13 carries, 72 yards
- DC – Jhurell Pressley - 15 carries, 107 yards

Top receivers

- STL – L'Damian Washington – 5 receptions, 114 yards
- DC – Khari Lee – 3 receptions, 14 yards, TD
