= 2020 St. Louis BattleHawks season =

American professional football season

2020 St. Louis Battlehawks season
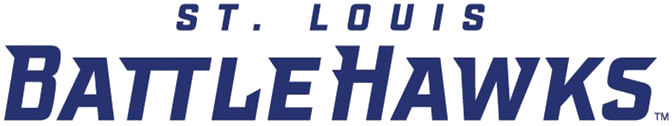
- Owner: Alpha Entertainment, LLC
- General manager: Jonathan Hayes
- Head coach: Jonathan Hayes
- Home stadium: The Dome at America's Center

Results
- Record: 3–2
- League place: Tie 1st XFL East

The 2020 St. Louis Battlehawks season was the first season for the St. Louis Battlehawks as a professional American football franchise. They played as charter members of the XFL, one of eight teams to compete in the league for the 2020 season. The Battlehawks played their home games at The Dome at America's Center and were led by head coach Jonathan Hayes.

Their inaugural season was cut short due to the COVID-19 pandemic and the XFL officially suspended operations for the remainder of the season on March 20, 2020.

== Standings ==
2020 XFL standings
East Division
Team	W	L	PCT	TD+/-	TD+	TD-	DIV	PF	PA	DIFF	STK
DC Defenders	3	2	.600	-3	9	12	2–1	82	89	-7	W1
St. Louis BattleHawks	3	2	.600	3	11	8	1–1	97	77	20	L1
New York Guardians	3	2	.600	-1	8	9	1–2	79	85	-6	W2
Tampa Bay Vipers	1	4	.200	-4	11	15	1–1	98	115	-17	L1
West Division
Team	W	L	PCT	TD+/-	TD+	TD-	DIV	PF	PA	DIFF	STK
Houston Roughnecks	5	0	1.000	7	21	14	3–0	158	111	47	W5
Dallas Renegades	2	3	.400	-3	9	12	2–1	90	102	-12	L2
Los Angeles Wildcats	2	3	.400	4	18	14	0–2	129	122	7	W1
Seattle Dragons	1	4	.200	-3	12	15	0–2	87	119	-32	L3
(x)–clinched playoff berth; (y)–clinched conference; (e)–eliminated from playoff contention

== Schedule ==
All times Central

Week	Day	Date	Kickoff	TV	Opponent	Results		Location
Week	Day	Date	Kickoff	TV	Opponent	Score	Record	Location
1	Sunday	February 9	4:00 p.m.	ESPN	at Dallas Renegades	W 15–9	1–0	Globe Life Park in Arlington
2	Sunday	February 16	5:00 p.m.	FS1	at Houston Roughnecks	L 24–28	1–1	TDECU Stadium
3	Sunday	February 23	2:00 p.m.	ESPN	New York Guardians	W 29–9	2–1	The Dome at America's Center
4	Saturday	February 29	4:00 p.m.	Fox	Seattle Dragons	W 23–16	3–1	The Dome at America's Center
5	Sunday	March 8	2:00 p.m.	FS1	at DC Defenders	L 6–15	3–2	Audi Field
6	Saturday	March 14	4:00 p.m.	FS2	at Tampa Bay Vipers	Not played		Raymond James Stadium
7	Saturday	March 21	4:00 p.m.	Fox	Los Angeles Wildcats	Not played		The Dome at America's Center
8	Saturday	March 28	4:00 p.m.	Fox	at New York Guardians	Not played		MetLife Stadium
9	Sunday	April 5	11:00 a.m.	ESPN	Tampa Bay Vipers	Not played		The Dome at America's Center
10	Sunday	April 12	2:00 p.m.	ABC	DC Defenders	Not played		The Dome at America's Center

== Final roster ==
2020 St. Louis Battlehawks final roster
Quarterbacks: 4 Nick Fitzgerald; 6 Taylor Heinicke; 10 Jordan Ta'amu; Running backs: 36 Keith Ford; 24 Matt Jones; 33 Christine Michael; 20 Lenard Tillery; Wide receivers: 14 Carlton Agudosi; 9 Davon Grayson; 17 Keith Mumphery; 15 De'Mornay Pierson-El; 87 Brandon Reilly; 84 Alonzo Russell; 2 L'Damian Washington; Tight ends: 89 Connor Davis; 86 Gabe Holmes; 85 Marcus Lucas; 83 Wes Saxton	Offensive linemen: 66 Dejon Allen G; 70 Gerhard de Beer T; 77 Brian Fineanganofo T; 67 Brian Folkerts C; 78 Korren Kirven G; 73 Matt McCants T; 69 Andrew McDonald T; 64 Michael Miller C; 76 Kent Perkins G; 61 Bruno Reagan G; 75 Brian Wallace T; Defensive linemen: 55 Andrew Ankrah DE; 98 Will Clarke DE; 54 Dewayne Hendrix DE; 96 DaVonte Lambert DT; 99 Jake Payne DT; 53 Gimel President DE; 90 Casey Sayles DT; 95 Channing Ward DT; 92 JoJo Wicker DT	Linebackers: 57 Terence Garvin; 45 Andrew Jackson; 42 Shaq Jones; 26 Dexter McCoil; 52 Anthony Stubbs; Defensive backs: 25 Will Hill SS; 41 Darius Hillary CB; 21 Harold Jones-Quartey FS; 28 Robert Nelson CB; 44 Joe Powell SS; 37 Trovon Reed CB; 29 David Rivers CB; 23 Kenny Robinson FS; 27 Marquez White CB; 22 Ryan White FS; Special teams: 48 Tanner Carew LS; 8 Cory Carter P; 7 Marquette King P; 5 Taylor Russolino K	Reserve lists: 32 Sherman Badie RB (IR); 79 Kevin Bowen T (IR); 72 Jake Campos T (IR); 68 Sean Hickey T (IR); 56 Ro'Derrick Hoskins ILB (IR); 82 Cole Hunt TE (IR); 99 Khyri Thornton DT (IR); 57 active, 8 inactive

== Staff ==
2020 St. Louis Battlehawks staff
Front office: President – Kurt Hunzeker; Director of player personnel – Trey Brown; Director of Football Operations – Frank Bestich, Jr.; Manager of Football Operations/Scout – Jeff Bauer; Head coaches: Head coach/general manager – Jonathan Hayes; Offensive coaches: Offensive coordinator – Chuck Long/Doug Meacham; Quarterbacks – Chuck Long; Running backs – Reggie Davis/Chuck Long; Receivers – Az-Zahir Hakim; Tight ends/Quality control – Nick Siciliano; Offensive Line – Brian Braswell; Assistant offensive line – Grant Williams	Defensive coaches: Defensive coordinator/Defensive line – Jay Hayes; Assistant defensive line – Michael George; Linebackers – Matt Raich; Defensive back – Tim Lewis; Assistant defensive backs/Quality Control – Chris Crocker

== Game summaries ==
=== Week 1: at Dallas Renegades ===
Week 1 — St. Louis at Dallas

Quarter	1	2	3	4	Total
BattleHawks	0	6	0	9	15
Renegades	0	6	3	0	9

at Globe Life Park in Arlington, Arlington, Texas

- Date: Sunday, February 9
- Game time: 4:00 p.m. CST
- Game weather: Cloudy • Temperature: 66 °F (19 °C) • Wind: S 12 mph
- Game attendance: 17,206
- Referee: James Carter
- TV announcers (ESPN): Tom Hart (play-by-play), Joey Galloway (analyst), Pat McAfee (sideline)

Game information

First quarter
No scoring
Second quarter

- DAL – Austin MacGinnis 32-yard field goal, 9:46. Renegades 3–0. Drive: 13 plays, 50 yards, 5:37.
- STL – Keith Ford 16-yard rush (2-pt. failed), 1:26. BattleHawks 6–3. Drive: 10 plays, 62 yards, 3:20.
- DAL – Austin MacGinnis 42-yard field goal, 0:08. Tied 6–6. Drive: 8 plays, 50 yards, 1:17.

Third quarter

- DAL – Austin MacGinnis 23-yard field goal, 5:57. Renegades 9–6. Drive: 9 plays, 61, 4:43.

Fourth quarter

- STL – Alonzo Russell 9-yard pass from Jordan Ta'amu (1-pt. failed). BattleHawks 12–9. Drive: 11 plays, 83 yards, 4:04.
- STL – Taylor Russolino 48-yard field goal. BattleHawks 15–9. Drive: 10 plays, 68 yards, 4:42.

Top passers

- STL – Jordan Ta'amu – 20/27, 209 yards, TD
- DAL – Philip Nelson – 33/42, 209 yards, INT

Top rushers

- STL – Matt Jones – 21 rushes, 85 yards
- DAL – Lance Dunbar – 5 rushes, 27 yards

Top receivers

- STL – De'Mornay Pierson-El – 4 receptions, 61 yards
- DAL – Flynn Nagel – 6 receptions, 43 yards

=== Week 2: at Houston Roughnecks ===
Week 2 — St. Louis at Houston

Quarter	1	2	3	4	Total
BattleHawks	6	0	12	6	24
Roughnecks	9	12	0	7	28

at TDECU Stadium, Houston, Texas

- Date: Sunday, February 16
- Game time: 5:00 p.m. CST
- Game weather: Partly cloudy • Temperature: 66 °F (19 °C) • Wind: SSE 6 mph
- Game attendance: 17,103
- Referee: Jeff Heaser
- TV announcers (Fox Sports 1): Kevin Burkhardt (play-by-play), Greg Olsen (analyst)

Game information

First quarter

- HOU – Sergio Castillo 44-yard field goal, 11:06. Roughnecks 3–0. Drive: 9 plays, 32 yards, 3:59.
- STL – Matt Jones 25-yard pass from Jordan Ta'amu (2-pt. failed), 6:30. BattleHawks 6–3. Drive: 9 yards, 71 yards, 4:40.
- HOU – Cam Phillips 7-yard pass from Phillip Walker (2-pt. failed), 3:21. Roughnecks 9–6. Drive: 6 plays, 66 yards, 3:07.

Second quarter

- HOU – James Butler 1-yard rush (2-pt. failed), 9:57. Roughnecks 15–6. Drive: 1 play, 1 yard, 0:05.
- HOU – Cam Phillips 9-yard pass from Phillip Walker (1-pt. failed), Roughnecks 21–6, 1:59. Drive: 7 plays, 68 yards, 3:30.

Third quarter

- STL – De'Mornay Pierson-El 1-yard pass from Jordan Ta'amu (2-pt. failed), 9:00. Roughnecks 21–12. Drive: 13 plays, 72 yards, 6:04.
- STL – Jordan Ta'amu 4-yard rush (1-pt. failed), 1:34. Roughnecks 21–18. Drive: 13 plays, 60 yards, 5:18.

Fourth quarter

- HOU – Cam Phillips 2-yard pass to Phillip Walker (1-pt. good), 9:36. Roughnecks 28–18. Drive: 3 plays, 6 yards, 0:59.
- STL – L'Damian Washington 36-yard pass from Jordan Ta'amu (1-pt. failed), 1:50. Roughnecks 28–14. Drive: 9 plays, 65 yards, 3:45.

Top passers

- STL – Jordan Ta'amu – 30/37, 284 yards, 3 TD, 2 INT
- HOU – Phillip Walker – 20/31, 170 yards, 3 TD

Top rushers

- STL – Matt Jones – 16 carries, 44 yards
- HOU – James Butler – 7 carries, 28 yards, 1 TD

Top receivers

- STL – L'Damian Washington – 6 receptions, 77 yards, 1 TD
- HOU – Cam Phillips – 8 receptions, 63 yards, 3 TD

=== Week 3: New York Guardians ===
Week 3 — New York at St. Louis

Quarter	1	2	3	4	Total
Guardians	0	3	0	6	9
BattleHawks	6	17	3	3	29

at The Dome at America's Center, St. Louis, Missouri

- Date: Saturday, February 22
- Game time: 2:00 p.m. CST
- Game weather: N/A (Indoor)
- Game attendance: 29,554
- Referee: Brandon Cruse
- TV announcers (ESPN): Tom Hart (play-by-play), Joey Galloway (analyst), Pat McAfee (field analyst)

Game information

First quarter

- STL – Christine Michael 14-yard rush (2-pt. failed), 13:17. BattleHawks 6–0. Drive: 4 plays, 72 yards, 1:49.

Second quarter

- NY – Matt McCrane 53-yard field goal, 12:31. BattleHawks 6–3. Drive: 7 plays, 30 yards, 3:51.
- STL – Joe Powell 84-yard kickoff return (2-pt. failed), 12:24. BattleHawks 12–3.
- STL – Taylor Russolino 39-yard field goal, 4:29. BattleHawks 15–3. Drive: 11 plays, 37 yards, 5:10.
- STL – Matt Jones 1-yard rush (2-pt. good), 1:12. BattleHawks 23–3. Drive: 5 plays, 17 yards, 0:57.

Third quarter

- STL – Taylor Russolino 58-yard field goal, 10:03. BattleHawks 26–3. Drive: 7 plays, 36 yards, 3:04.

Fourth quarter

- NY – Austin Duke 8-yard pass from Luis Perez (3-pt. failed), 6:19. BattleHawks 26–9. Drive: 5 plays, 40 yards, 2:17.
- STL – Taylor Russolino 36-yard field goal, 0:51. BattleHawks 29–9. Drive: 13 plays, 54 yards, 5:26.

Top passers

- NY – Marquise Williams – 7/15, 94 yards
- STL – Jordan Ta'amu – 12/18, 119 yards

Top rushers

- NY – Tim Cook III – 9 carries, 50 yards
- STL – Matt Jones – 15 carries, 95 yards, TD

Top receivers

- NY – Austin Duke – 4 receptions, 43 yards, 1 TD
- STL – Alonzo Russell – 3 receptions, 36 yards

=== Week 4: Seattle Dragons ===
Week 4 — Seattle at St. Louis

Quarter	1	2	3	4	Total
Dragons	0	3	7	6	16
BattleHawks	11	6	3	3	23

at The Dome at America's Center, St. Louis, Missouri

- Date: Saturday, February 29
- Game time: 4:00 p.m. CST
- Game weather: N/A (Indoor)
- Game attendance: 27,527
- Referee: Reggie Smith
- TV announcers (Fox): Curt Menefee (play-by-play), Joel Klatt (analyst), Brock Huard (sideline)

Game information

First quarter

- STL – De'Mornay Pierson-El 27-yard pass from Jordan Ta'amu (2-pt. good), 6:43. BattleHawks 8–0. Drive: 9 plays, 96 yards, 4:44.
- STL – Taylor Russolino 48-yard field goal, 0:13. BattleHawks 11–0. Drive: 9 plays, 32 yards, 5:01.

Second quarter

- SEA – Ernesto Lacayo 41-yard field goal, 13:31. BattleHawks 11–3. Drive: 5 plays, 22 yards, 1:39.
- STL – Keith Ford 13-yard rush (2-pt. failed), 2:00. BattleHawks 17–3. Drive: 12 plays, 78 yards, 7:05.

Third quarter

- SEA – Kenneth Farrow 1-yard rush (1-pt. good), 8:04. BattleHawks 17–10. Drive: 5 plays, 65 yards, 2:28.
- STL – Taylor Russolino 38-yard field goal, 1:05. BattleHawks 20–10. Drive: 13 plays, 46 yards, 6:59.

Fourth quarter

- SEA – Evan Rodriguez 10-yard pass from B. J. Daniels (3-pt. failed), 13:18. BattleHawks 20–16.
- STL – Taylor Russolino 25-yard field goal, 8:14. BattleHawks 23–16. Drive: 9 plays, 77 yards, 5:04.

Top passers

- SEA – B. J. Daniels – 5/10, 100 yards, TD, INT
- STL – Jordan Ta'amu – 20/27, 264 yards, TD

Top rushers

- SEA – B. J. Daniels – 7 carries, 84 yards
- STL – Jordan Ta'amu – 16 carries, 63 yards

Top receivers

- SEA – Alonzo Moore – 1 reception, 57 yards
- STL – De'Mornay Pierson-El – 5 receptions, 71 yards, TD

=== Week 5: at DC Defenders ===
Week 5 — St. Louis at DC

Quarter	1	2	3	4	Total
BattleHawks	3	3	0	0	6
Defenders	6	0	6	3	15

at Audi Field, Washington, D.C.

- Date: Sunday, March 8
- Game time: 2:00 p.m. CST / 3:00 p.m. EST
- Referee: John O'Neill
- TV announcers (FS1): Kevin Burkhardt (play-by-play), Greg Olsen (analyst)

Game information

First quarter

Second quarter

Third quarter

Fourth quarter

Top passers

- STL –
- DC –

Top rushers

- STL –
- DC –

Top receivers

- STL –
- DC –
