= 2020 Los Angeles Wildcats season =

American professional football season

- Owner: Alpha Entertainment, LLC
- General manager: Winston Moss
- Head coach: Winston Moss
- Home stadium: Dignity Health Sports Park

Results
- Record: 2–3
- League place: Tie 2nd XFL West

The 2020 Los Angeles Wildcats season was the only season for the Los Angeles Wildcats as a professional American football franchise. They played as charter members of the XFL, one of eight teams to compete in the league for the 2020 season. The Wildcats played their home games at Dignity Health Sports Park and were led by head coach Winston Moss.

Their inaugural season was cut short due to the COVID-19 pandemic and the XFL officially suspended operations for the remainder of the season on March 20, 2020.

== Offseason ==
=== XFL draft ===
==== Tier 1 Quarterback Allocations ====
Player	Pos.	College
Luis Perez	QB	Texas A&M–Commerce

==== Phase 1: Skill Players ====
Rnd.	Pick #	Player	Pos.	College
1	8	Elijah Hood	RB	North Carolina
2	9	Rashad Ross	WR	Arizona State
3	24	Nelson Spruce	WR	Colorado
4	25	Brandon Barnes	TE	Alabama State
5	40	Larry Rose III	RB	New Mexico State
6	41	KD Cannon	WR	Baylor
7	56	Martez Carter	RB	Grambling State
8	57	Keyarris Garrett	WR	Tulsa
9	72	Scott Orndoff	TE	Pittsburgh
10	73	Donteea Dye	WR	Heidelberg

==== Phase 2: Offensive line ====
Rnd.	Pick #	Player	Pos.	College
1	1	Storm Norton	OT	Toledo
2	16	Fred Lauina	G	Oregon State
3	17	Ryan Pope	OT	San Diego State
4	32	Jaelin Robinson	OT	Temple
5	33	Damien Mama	G	USC
6	48	Nico Siragusa	G	San Diego State
7	49	Ryan Cummings	OT	Wyoming
8	64	Lene Maiava	OT	Arizona
9	65	Tyler Roemer	OT	San Diego State
10	80	Anthony Morris	OT	Tennessee State

==== Phase 3: Defensive Front Seven ====
Rnd.	Pick #	Player	Pos.	College
1	4	Anthony Johnson	DT	LSU
2	13	Eric Pinkins	LB	San Diego State
3	20	Latarius Brady	DT	Memphis
4	29	Willie Mays	DE	Tiffin
5	36	Tre' Williams	LB	Auburn
6	45	Leon Orr	DT	Florida
7	52	Reggie Howard	DT	Toledo
8	61	Corey Vereen	DE	Tennessee
9	68	Adrian Hubbard	DE	Alabama
10	77	Owen Roberts	DT	San Jose State

==== Phase 4: Defensive backs ====
Rnd.	Pick #	Player	Pos.	College
1	5	Jack Tocho	CB	North Carolina State
2	12	Jaylen Dunlap	CB	Illinois
3	21	C.J. Moore	CB	North Carolina Central
4	28	Roman Tatum	CB	Southern Illinois
5	37	Jordan Powell	S	Widener
6	44	Ahmad Dixon	S	Baylor
7	53	Harlan Miller	CB	Southeastern Louisiana
8	60	Jerome Couplin	S	William & Mary
9	69	Mike Stevens	CB	North Carolina State
10	76	Bryce Cheek	CB	Akron

==== Phase 5: Open Draft ====
Player	Pos.	College
Adonis Jennings	WR	Temple
Shawn Oakman	DE	Baylor
Andrew Williams	DT	Auburn
Taiwan Jones	LB	Michigan State

== Standings ==
2020 XFL standings
East Division
Team	W	L	PCT	TD+/-	TD+	TD-	DIV	PF	PA	DIFF	STK
DC Defenders	3	2	.600	-3	9	12	2–1	82	89	-7	W1
St. Louis BattleHawks	3	2	.600	3	11	8	1–1	97	77	20	L1
New York Guardians	3	2	.600	-1	8	9	1–2	79	85	-6	W2
Tampa Bay Vipers	1	4	.200	-4	11	15	1–1	98	115	-17	L1
West Division
Team	W	L	PCT	TD+/-	TD+	TD-	DIV	PF	PA	DIFF	STK
Houston Roughnecks	5	0	1.000	7	21	14	3–0	158	111	47	W5
Dallas Renegades	2	3	.400	-3	9	12	2–1	90	102	-12	L2
Los Angeles Wildcats	2	3	.400	4	18	14	0–2	129	122	7	W1
Seattle Dragons	1	4	.200	-3	12	15	0–2	87	119	-32	L3
(x)–clinched playoff berth; (y)–clinched conference; (e)–eliminated from playoff contention

== Schedule ==
All times Pacific

Week	Day	Date	Kickoff	TV	Opponent	Results		Location
Week	Day	Date	Kickoff	TV	Opponent	Score	Record	Location
1	Saturday	February 8	2:00 p.m.	Fox	at Houston Roughnecks	L 17–37	0–1	TDECU Stadium
2	Sunday	February 16	12:00 p.m.	ABC	Dallas Renegades	L 18–25	0–2	Dignity Health Sports Park
3	Sunday	February 23	3:00 p.m.	FS1	DC Defenders	W 39–9	1–2	Dignity Health Sports Park
4	Saturday	February 29	11:00 a.m.	ABC	at New York Guardians	L 14–17	1–3	MetLife Stadium
5	Sunday	March 8	6:00 p.m.	ESPN	Tampa Bay Vipers	W 41–34	2–3	Dignity Health Sports Park
6	Sunday	March 15	4:00 p.m.	ESPN	at Seattle Dragons	Not played		CenturyLink Field
7	Saturday	March 21	2:00 p.m.	Fox	at St. Louis BattleHawks	Not played		The Dome at America's Center
8	Sunday	March 29	12:00 p.m.	ABC	Houston Roughnecks	Not played		Dignity Health Sports Park
9	Sunday	April 5	3:00 p.m.	FS1	Seattle Dragons	Not played		Dignity Health Sports Park
10	Thursday	April 9	5:00 p.m.	Fox	at Dallas Renegades	Not played		Globe Life Park in Arlington

== Final roster ==
2020 Los Angeles Wildcats final roster
Quarterbacks: 8 Josh Johnson; 3 Chad Kanoff; 2 Jalan McClendon; Running backs: -- Terrell Alex; 28 Martez Carter; 38 Winston Dimel; 26 DuJuan Harris; 34 Elijah Hood; 24 Larry Rose; Wide receivers: -- Sergio Bailey; 80 Saeed Blacknall; 17 Jalen Greene; 18 Adonis Jennings; 15 Tre McBride; 84 Jordan Smallwood; 11 Nelson Spruce; Tight ends: 88 De'Quan Hampton; -- Ryan O'Malley	Offensive linemen: -- Sean Brown C; 59 Fred Lauina G; 75 Lene Maiava T; 72 Storm Norton T; 73 Jaelin Robinson T; 74 Tyler Roemer T; 56 Nico Siragusa G; 66 Patrick Vahe C; 62 Dwayne Wallace G; Defensive linemen: 99 Latarius Brady DE; 90 Roderick Henderson NT; 97 Reggie Howard NT; 95 Alex Jenkins DE; 94 Cedric Reed DE; 91 Boogie Roberts NT; 96 Andrew Stelter DE; 98 Devin Taylor DE	Linebackers: -- Alex Funches OLB; 50 Quentin Gause MLB; 54 Taiwan Jones OLB; 77 Shawn Oakman OLB; 59 Victor Ochi OLB; 57 Will Smith OLB; 52 Tre' Williams MLB; Defensive backs: -- Bryce Cheek CB; 22 Jerome Couplin SS; 21 Mar'Sean Diggs S; 36 Ahmad Dixon SS; 20 Jaylen Dunlap CB; 27 Harlan Miller CB; 33 Arrion Springs CB; 23 Mike Stevens CB; 30 Bradley Sylve CB; 47 Roman Tatum CB; 29 Jack Tocho FS; 32 LaDarius Wiley S; Special teams: 45 Ryan Navarro LS; 4 Giorgio Tavecchio K; 7 Shane Tripucka P	Reserve lists: 82 Brandon Barnes TE (IR); -- Ryan Cummings G (IR); -- Toa Lobendahn G (IR); -- Willie Mays OLB (IR); 70 Kahlil McKenzie G/C (IR); -- Anthony Morris T (IR); 9 Nick Novak K (IR); -- Damian Prince OT (IR); 93 Trevon Sanders DE (IR); -- Colton Schmidt P (IR); 57 active, 10 inactive

== Staff ==
2020 Los Angeles Wildcats staff
Front office: Director of player personnel – Joey Clinkscales; Director of football operations – Charles Bailey; Manager of football operations – Ty Knott; Head coaches: Head coach/general manager – Winston Moss; Assistant head coach/tight ends – Ty Knott; Offensive coaches: Offensive coordinator/quarterbacks – Norm Chow; Running backs – Dave Atkins; Receivers – Mike Wilson; Offensive line – Jerry Fontenot; Offensive quality control – Kade Rannings	Defensive coaches: Defensive line – Vince Amey; Defensive backs – Otis Smith; Defensive quality control – Al Brown; Special teams coaches: Special teams coordinator/safeties – Martin Bayless

== Game summaries ==
=== Week 1: at Houston Roughnecks ===
Week 1 — Los Angeles at Houston

Quarter	1	2	3	4	Total
Wildcats	8	9	0	0	17
Roughnecks	6	12	8	11	37

at TDECU Stadium, Houston, Texas

- Date: Saturday, February 8
- Game time: 2:00 p.m. PST
- Game weather: Partly cloudy • Temperature: 70 °F (21 °C) • Wind: ESE 10 mph
- Game attendance: 17,815
- Referee: Brandon Cruse
- TV announcers (Fox): Curt Menefee (play-by-play), Joel Klatt (analyst), Brock Huard (sideline)

Game information

First quarter

- HOU – Cam Phillips 50-yard pass from Phillip Walker (1-pt. failed), 13:44. Roughnecks 6–0. Drive: 3 plays, 61 yards, 1:23.
- LA – Chad Kanoff 5-yard run (2-pt. good), 7:49. Wildcats 8–6. Drive: 11 plays, 71 yards, 5:58.

Second quarter

- LA – Jordan Smallwood 11-yard pass from Chad Kanoff (2-pt. failed), 9:26. Wildcats 14–6. Drive: 6 plays, 59 yards, 2:18.
- HOU – James Butler 16-yard pass from Phillip Walker (2-pt. failed), 7:22. Wildcats 14–12. Drive: 5 plays, 73 yards, 2:06.
- LA – Nick Novak 35-yard field goal, 1:30. Wildcats 17–12. Drive: 14 plays, 55 yards, 5:49.
- HOU – Sam Mobley 39-yard pass from Phillip Walker (2-pt. failed), 1:10. Roughnecks 18–17. Drive: 2 plays, 39 yards, 0:23.

Third quarter

- HOU – Kahlil Lewis 4-yard pass from Phillip Walker (2-pt. good), 9:04. Roughnecks 26–17. Drive: 7 plays, 48 yards, 3:46.

Fourth quarter

- HOU – Sergio Castillo 44-yard field goal, 14:26. Roughnecks 29–17. Drive: 9 plays, 38 yards, 4:05.
- HOU – James Butler 4-yard run (2-pt. good), 10:01. Roughnecks 37–17. Drive: 6 plays, 42 yards, 2:44.

Top passers

- LA – Chad Kanoff – 21/40, 214 yards, TD, INT
- HOU – Phillip Walker – 23/39, 272 yards, 4 TD, INT

Top rushers

- LA – Elijah Hood – 12 rushes, 43 yards
- HOU – James Butler – 9 carries, 30 yards, TD

Top receivers

- LA – Nelson Spruce – 11 receptions, 103 yards
- HOU – Cam Phillips – 4 receptions, 67 yards, TD

=== Week 2: vs. Dallas Renegades ===
Week 2 — Dallas at Los Angeles

Quarter	1	2	3	4	Total
Renegades	0	3	3	19	25
Wildcats	0	3	0	15	18

at Dignity Health Sports Park, Los Angeles, California

- Date: Sunday, February 16
- Game time: 2:00 p.m. PST
- Game weather: Sunny • Temperature: 70 °F (21 °C) • Wind: SW 3 mph
- Game attendance: 14,979
- Referee: Reggie Smith
- TV announcers (ABC): Tom Hart (play-by-play), Joey Galloway (analyst), Pat McAfee (sideline)

Game information

First quarter
No scoring
Second quarter

- LA – Nick Novak 47-yard field goal, 3:11. Wildcats 3–0. Drive: 9 plays, 38 yards, 4:39.
- DAL – Austin MacGinnis 41-yard field goal, 0:11. Tied 3–3. Drive: 12 plays, 50 yards, 2:49.

Third quarter

- DAL – Austin MacGinnis 45-yard field goal, 1:06. Renegades 6–3. Drive: 12 plays, 69 yards, 6:04.

Fourth quarter

- LA – Nelson Spruce 6-yard pass from Josh Johnson (1-pt. failed), 11:57. Wildcats 9–6. Drive: 9 plays, 64 yards, 4:05.
- DAL – Cameron Artis-Payne 21-yard rush (1-pt. good), 9:00. Renegades 13–9. Drive: 6 plays, 68 yards, 2:58.
- DAL – Donald Parham 3-yard pass from Landry Jones (1-pt. failed), 5:02. Renegades 19–9. Drive: 5 plays, 25 yards, 2:14.
- LA – Nelson Spruce 44-yard pass from Josh Johnson (3-pt. good), 4:45. Renegades 19–18. Drive: 2 plays, 44 yards, 0:18.
- DAL – Cameron Artis-Payne 17-yard rush (1-pt. failed), 1:14. Renegades 25–18. Drive: 7 plays, 64 yards, 3:31.

Top passers

- DAL – Landry Jones – 28/40, 305 yards, TD, 2 INT
- LA – Josh Johnson – 18/34, 196 yards, 2 TD

Top rushers

- DAL – Cameron Artis-Payne – 14 carries, 99 yards, 2 TD
- LA – Elijah Hood – 10 carries, 31 yards

Top receivers

- DAL – Donald Parham – 5 receptions, 76 yards, TD
- LA – Nelson Spruce – 6 receptions, 89 yards, 2 TD

=== Week 3: vs. DC Defenders ===
Week 3 – DC at Los Angeles

Quarter	1	2	3	4	Total
Defenders	0	3	0	6	9
Wildcats	6	21	6	6	39

at Dignity Health Sports Park, Los Angeles, CA

- Date: Sunday, February 23
- Game time: 3:00 p.m. PST
- Game weather: Sunny • Temperature: 65 °F (18 °C) • Wind: N 3 mph
- Game attendance: 12,211
- Referee: Tra Blake
- TV announcers (FS1): Curt Menefee (play-by-play), Greg Olsen (analyst), Jenny Taft (sideline)

Game information

First quarter

- LA – Tre McBride 40-yard pass from Josh Johnson (2-pt. failed), 12:27. Wildcats 6–0. Drive: 5 plays, 71 yards, 2:50.

Second quarter

- LA – Larry Rose 1-yard rush (2-pt. good), 14:24. Wildcats 14–0. Drive: 5 plays, 28 yards, 2:20.
- LA – Tre McBride 28-yard pass from Josh Johnson (1-pt. failed), 8:47. Wildcats 20–0. Drive: 7 plays, 42 yards, 3:19.
- LA – Martez Carter 1-yard rush (1-pt. good), 4:48. Wildcats 27–0. Drive: 2 plays, 4 yards, 0:32.
- DC – Tyler Rausa 32-yard field goal, 0:30. Wildcats 27–3. Drive: 7 plays, 34 yards, 0:56.

Third quarter

- LA – Martez Carter 18-yard pass from Josh Johnson (1-pt. failed), 6:45. Wildcats 33–3. Drive: 7 plays, 96 yards, 2:47.

Fourth quarter

- LA – Martez Carter 20-yard rush (1-pt. failed), 11:39. Wildcats 39–3. Drive: 7 plays, 94 yards, 3:45.
- DC – Nick Brosette 38-yard rush (3-pt. failed), 7:33. Wildcats 39–9. Drive: 8 plays, 70 yards, 4:08.

Top passers

- DC – Cardale Jones – 13/26, 103 yards, 4 INT
- LA – Josh Johnson – 18/25, 278 yards, 3 TD

Top rushers

- DC – Nick Brosette – 8 carries, 75 yards, TD
- LA – Martez Carter – 11 carries, 34 yards, 2 TD

Top receivers

- DC – Khari Lee – 3 receptions, 38 yards
- LA – Tre McBride – 5 receptions, 109 yards, 2 TD

=== Week 4: at New York Guardians ===
Week 4 — Los Angeles at New York

Quarter	1	2	3	4	Total
Wildcats	6	0	8	0	14
Guardians	3	11	0	3	17

at MetLife Stadium, East Rutherford, New Jersey

- Date: Saturday, February 29
- Game time: 2:00 p.m. EST
- Game weather: Sunny • Temperature: 41 °F (5 °C) • Wind: SE 13 mph
- Referee: James Carter
- TV announcers (ABC): Steve Levy (play-by-play), Greg McElroy (analyst), Tom Luginbill and Dianna Russini (sideline)

Game information

First quarter

- NY – Matt McCrane 51-yard field goal, 5:51. Guardians 3–0. Drive: 10 plays, 37 yards, 5:15.
- LA – Tre McBride 4-yard pass from Josh Johnson (2-pt. failed), 0:07. 'Wildcats 6–3. Drive: 10 plays, 68 yards, 5:43.

Second quarter

- NY – Matt McCrane 23-yard field goal, 8:15. Tied 6–6. Drive: 12 plays, 60 yards, 6:51.
- NY – Mekale McKay 3-yard pass from Luis Perez (2-pt. good), 1:31. Guardians 14–6. Drive: 10 plays, 63 yards, 4:32.

Third quarter

- LA – Saeed Blacknall 42-yard pass from Josh Johnson (2-pt. good), 4:45. Tied 14–14. Drive: 4 plays, 81 yards, 1:47.

Fourth quarter

- NY – Matt McCrane 47-yard field goal, 10:57. Guardians 17–14. Drive: 9 plays, 26 yards, 4:18.

Top passers

- LA – Josh Johnson – 25/40, 330 yards, 2 TD, INT
- NY – Luis Perez – 18/26, 150 yards, TD

Top rushers

- LA – DuJuan Harris – 5 carries, 25 yards
- NY – Darius Victor – 18 carries, 82 yards

Top receivers

- LA – Tre McBride – 8 receptions, 127 yards, 1 TD
- NY – Colby Pearson – 5 receptions, 34 yards

=== Week 5: Tampa Bay Vipers ===
Week 5 — Tampa Bay at Los Angeles

Quarter	1	2	3	4	Total
Vipers	10	14	0	10	34
Wildcats	0	20	7	14	41

at Dignity Health Sports Park, Los Angeles, California

- Date: Sunday, March 8
- Game time: 6:00 p.m. PST
- Referee: Reggie Smith
- TV announcers (ESPN): Tom Hart (play-by-play), Joey Galloway (analyst), Pat McAfee (sideline)

Game information

First quarter

Second quarter

Third quarter

Fourth quarter

Top passers

- TB –
- LA –

Top rushers

- TB –
- LA –

Top receivers

- TB –
- LA –
