= Channing Stribling =

American football player (born 1994)

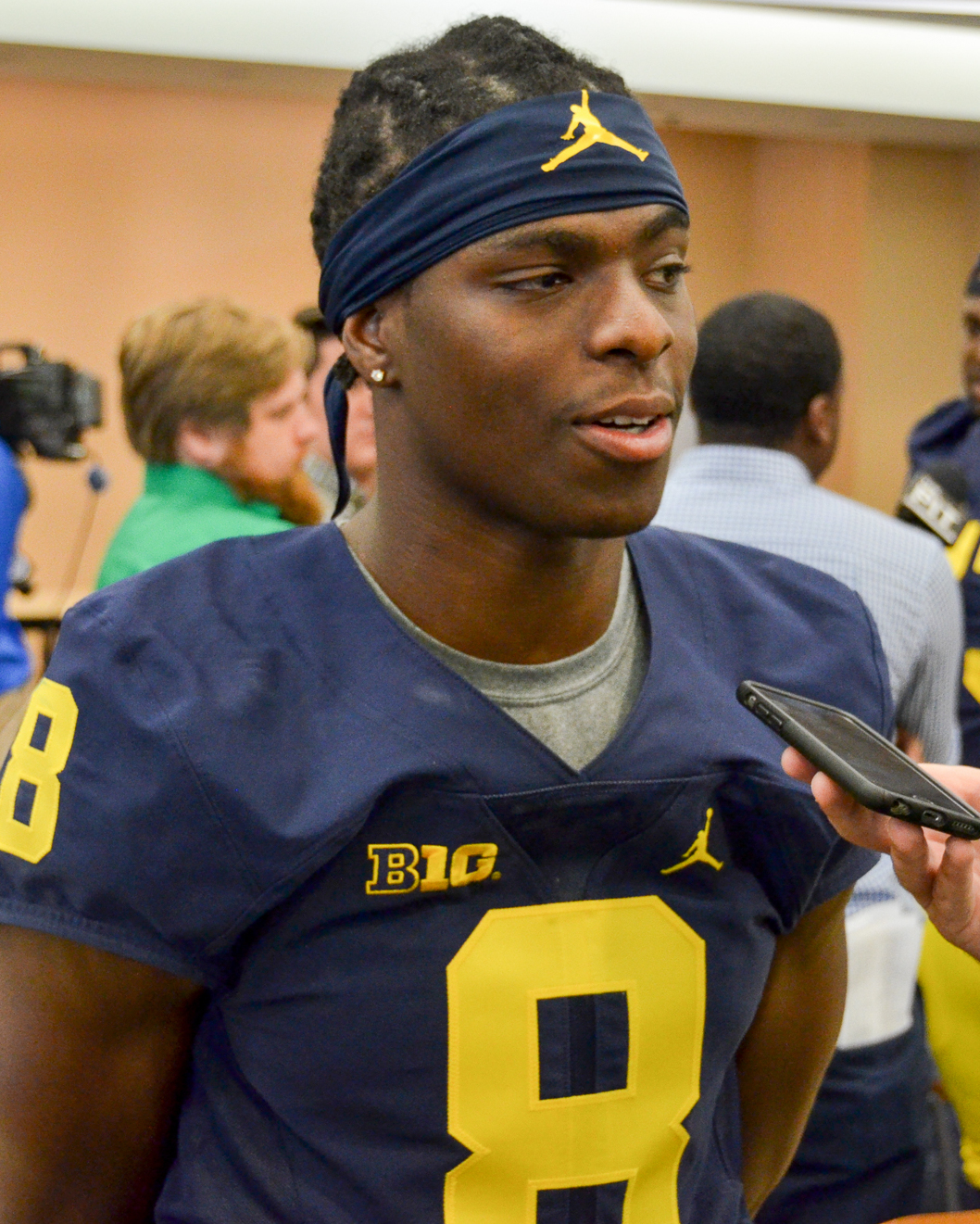
- Stribling with Michigan in 2016

No. 23 – Frankfurt Galaxy
- Position: Cornerback
- Roster status: Injured reserve
- CFL status: American

Personal information
- Born: November 21, 1994 (age 31); Matthews, North Carolina, U.S.
- Listed height: 6 ft 1 in (1.85 m)
- Listed weight: 188 lb (85 kg)

Career information
- High school: David W. Butler (Matthews)
- College: Michigan
- NFL draft: 2017: undrafted

Career history
- Cleveland Browns (2017)*; Indianapolis Colts (2017)*; San Francisco 49ers (2017–2018)*; Indianapolis Colts (2018)*; Los Angeles Chargers (2018)*; Memphis Express (2019); Hamilton Tiger-Cats (2019)*; Seattle Dragons (2020); Hamilton Tiger-Cats (2020–2021); Philadelphia Stars (2022); Washington Commanders (2022)*; Philadelphia Stars (2023); Birmingham Stallions (2024)*; St. Louis Battlehawks (2024); Frankfurt Galaxy (2025–present)
- * Offseason or practice squad member only

Awards and highlights
- All-USFL Team (2022); USFL interceptions leader (2022); Second-team All-Big Ten (2016)
- Stats at Pro Football Reference
- Stats at CFL.ca

Channing Michael-de Stribling (born November 21, 1994) is an American football cornerback for the Frankfurt Galaxy of the European League of Football (ELF). He played college football at Michigan and went undrafted in the 2017 NFL draft.

== Professional career ==
=== Cleveland Browns ===
Stribling signed with the Cleveland Browns as an undrafted free agent on May 4, 2017. He was waived on September 1, 2017, and was signed to the practice squad on September 6. He was released by the Browns on September 19, 2017.

=== Indianapolis Colts (first stint) ===
On September 26, 2017, Stribling was signed to the Indianapolis Colts' practice squad. He was released on November 6, 2017.

=== San Francisco 49ers ===
On November 29, 2017, Stribling was signed to the San Francisco 49ers' practice squad. He signed a reserve/future contract with the 49ers on January 2, 2018. Stribling was released on April 30, 2018.

=== Indianapolis Colts (second stint) ===
Stribling signed with the Colts on May 29, 2018, but was waived on June 14, 2018.

=== Los Angeles Chargers ===
On August 2, 2018, Stribling signed with the Los Angeles Chargers. He was waived on September 1, 2018. He was re-signed to the practice squad on September 26, 2018. He was released on October 10, 2018.

=== Memphis Express ===
On November 9, 2018, Stribling signed with the Memphis Express of the Alliance of American Football (AAF) for the 2019 season. The league ceased operations in April 2019.

=== Hamilton Tiger-Cats (first stint) ===
Stribling was signed to the practice roster of the Hamilton Tiger-Cats of the Canadian Football League on September 23, 2019.

=== Seattle Dragons ===
In October 2019's 2020 XFL draft, Stribling was selected by the Seattle Dragons. He had his contract terminated when the league suspended operations on April 10, 2020.

=== Hamilton Tiger-Cats (second stint) ===
Stribling re-signed with the Tiger-Cats on May 12, 2020. After the CFL canceled the 2020 season due to the COVID-19 pandemic, Stribling chose to opt out of his contract with the Tiger-Cats on September 1, 2020. Stribling was selected by the Generals of The Spring League during its player selection draft on October 12, 2020, and opted back in to his contract with the Tiger-Cats on January 4, 2021. Stribling spent most of his time on practice roster over two seasons. He did manage to dress for 4 games in 2021 but was ultimately released December 13, 2021.

=== Philadelphia Stars (first stint) ===
Stribling was selected by the Philadelphia Stars in the eighth round of the 2022 USFL draft. He was transferred to the inactive roster on May 14.

=== Washington Commanders ===
Stribling signed with the Washington Commanders on July 14, 2022. He was released on August 24, 2022.

=== Philadelphia Stars (second stint) ===
On November 17, 2022, Stribling was drafted by the St. Louis BattleHawks of the XFL, but instead re-signed with the Stars of the USFL on January 5, 2023. He was placed on the injured reserve list on June 6, 2023. The Stars folded when the XFL and USFL merged to create the United Football League (UFL).

=== Birmingham Stallions ===
On January 5, 2023, Stribbling was drafted by the Birmingham Stallions during the 2024 UFL dispersal draft. He was released on March 10, 2024.

=== St. Louis Battlehawks ===
On March 18, 2024, Stribling signed with the St. Louis Battlehawks of the United Football League (UFL). He was released on April 22, 2024.

=== Frankfurt Galaxy ===
On March 19, 2025, Stribling signed with the Frankfurt Galaxy of the European League of Football (ELF). On July 8, 2025, Stribling was placed on injured reserve.

=== Statistics ===
Year	League	Team	Games		Tackles				Interceptions						Fumbles			
Year	League	Team	GP	GS	Cmb	Solo	Ast	Sck	PD	Int	Yds	Avg	Lng	TD	FF	FR	Yds	TD
2019	AAF	MEM	8	6	19	17	2	0.0	–	1	31	31.0	31	0	0	0	0	0
2020	XFL	SEA	5	5	14	11	3	0.0	–	1	2	2.0	2	0	0	0	0	0
2021	CFL	HAM	4	0	6	6	0	0.0	–	0	0	0	0	0	0	0	0	0
2022	USFL	PHI	7	7	16	14	2	1.0	11	7	121	17.3	50	0	0	0	0	0
Career			23	21	55	48	7	1.0	11	9	154	17.1	50	0	0	0	0	0
