= Pasoni Tasini =

American football player (born 1993)

No. 65, 94
- Position: Defensive end

Personal information
- Born: May 31, 1993 (age 33); Ephraim, Utah, U.S.
- Listed height: 6 ft 3 in (1.91 m)
- Listed weight: 307 lb (139 kg)

Career information
- High school: Wailuku (HI) Baldwin
- College: Utah
- NFL draft: 2017: undrafted

Career history
- Arizona Cardinals (2017–2018); Seattle Dragons (2020)

Career NFL statistics
- Total tackles: 1
- Sacks: 0
- Forced fumbles: 0
- Fumble recoveries: 0
- Stats at Pro Football Reference

Pasoni Tasini (born May 31, 1993) is an American former professional football player who was a defensive end in the National Football League (NFL). He played college football for the Utah Utes.

== College career ==
By the end of Tasini's college football career, he recorded 35 tackles, 1.5 sacks, six pass breakups and two forced fumbles.

== Professional career ==
=== Arizona Cardinals ===
Tasini signed the Arizona Cardinals as an undrafted free agent on May 2, 2017. He was waived on September 2, 2017 and was signed to the practice squad the next day. He signed a reserve/future contract with the Cardinals on January 2, 2018.

On September 1, 2018, Tasini was waived by the Cardinals and was signed to the practice squad the next day. He was released on October 31, 2018. He was re-signed on December 5, 2018. He was promoted to the active roster on December 28, 2018.

On May 9, 2019, Tasini was waived by the Cardinals. He was re-signed on August 11, 2019. He was waived on August 31, 2019.

=== Seattle Dragons ===
In October 2019, Tasini was selected by the Seattle Dragons as part of the 2020 XFL draft. He had his contract terminated when the league suspended operations on April 10, 2020.
