= Praise Martin-Oguike =

Nigerian football player (born 1993)

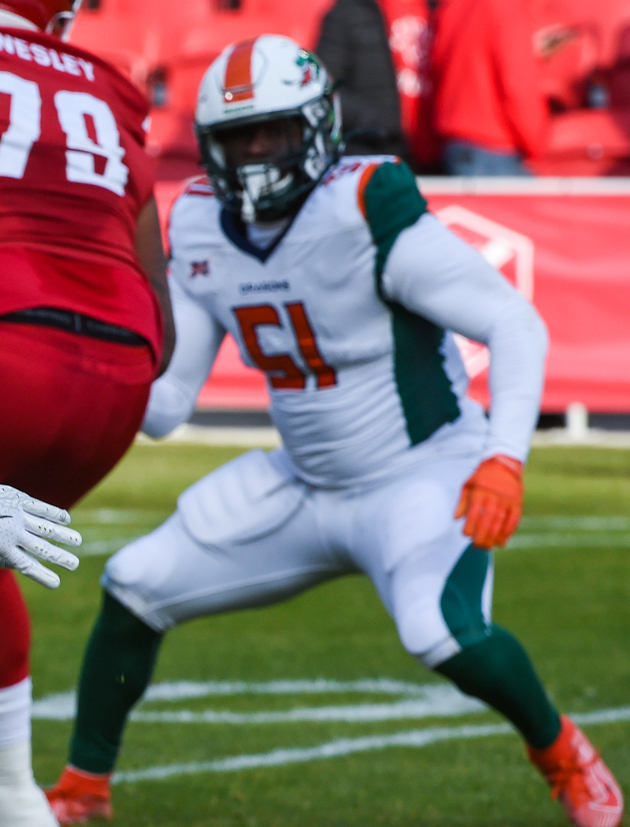
- Martin-Oguike with the Seattle Dragons in 2020

No. 51, 95
- Positions: Linebacker, defensive lineman

Personal information
- Born: August 30, 1993 (age 33); Abia State, Nigeria
- Listed height: 6 ft 0 in (1.83 m)
- Listed weight: 258 lb (117 kg)

Career information
- High school: Woodbridge (Woodbridge Township, New Jersey, U.S.)
- College: Temple
- NFL draft: 2017: undrafted

Career history
- Miami Dolphins (2017)*; Arizona Cardinals (2018)*; Seattle Dragons (2020); Ottawa Redblacks (2021–2022)
- * Offseason or practice squad member only
- Stats at Pro Football Reference

Praise Martin-Oguike (born August 30, 1993) is a Nigerian former professional gridiron football linebacker. He played college football at Temple University. Martin-Oguike was a member of the Miami Dolphins, Arizona Cardinals, Seattle Dragons, and Ottawa Redblacks.

== Early life ==
Martin-Oguike, was born in Abia State, Nigeria. He is a native of Oka in Isiala Mbano, Imo State. He moved to Woodbridge Township, New Jersey at the age of 10. Martin-Oguike is the son of Venerable Dr. Martin Oguike (Anglican clergyman and adjunct Professor) and Dr. Ngozi Martin-Oguike (Educator and author) who are both highly regarded in the Igbo community of Nigeria. He has a sister, Precious, and two brothers Percy and Pleasant.

== College career ==
Martin-Oguike recorded 124 tackles, 20 sacks, 1 interception, 12 forced fumbles, 4 fumble recoveries and 6 blocked field goals during his time at Temple.

== Professional career ==
Pre-draft measurables
Height	Weight	Arm length	Hand span	40-yard dash	10-yard split	20-yard split	20-yard shuttle	Three-cone drill	Vertical jump	Broad jump	Bench press
6 ft 0 3/8 in (1.84 m)	258 lb (117 kg)	31 1/2 in (0.80 m)	9 1/2 in (0.24 m)	4.88 s	1.60 s	2.74 s	4.53 s	7.25 s	28.0 in (0.71 m)	9 ft 4 in (2.84 m)	30 reps
All values from Pro Day

=== Miami Dolphins ===
Martin-Oguike signed with the Miami Dolphins as an undrafted free agent on May 5, 2017. He was waived on September 2, 2017.

=== Arizona Cardinals ===
On January 19, 2018, Martin-Oguike signed a reserve/future contract with the Arizona Cardinals. He was waived/injured by the Cardinals on July 26, 2018 and was placed on injured reserve. He was released on August 4, 2018.

=== Seattle Dragons ===
In October 2019, the Seattle Dragons selected Martin-Oguike in the tenth round of the 2020 XFL draft. He had his contract terminated when the league suspended operations on April 10, 2020.

Martin-Oguike was selected by the Blues of The Spring League during its player selection draft on October 11, 2020.

=== Ottawa Redblacks ===
Martin-Oguike signed with the Ottawa Redblacks of the CFL on June 4, 2021 as a defensive lineman. On his first two seasons in the CFL Martin-Oguike played in 18 regular season games and contributed with 32 defensive tackles, seven sacks, one forced fumble and one special teams tackle. On February 7, 2023, Martin-Oguike agreed to a one-year contract extension with Ottawa. On May 13, 2023, Martin-Oguike was released by the Redblacks.
