= Austin Proehl =

American football player (born 1995)

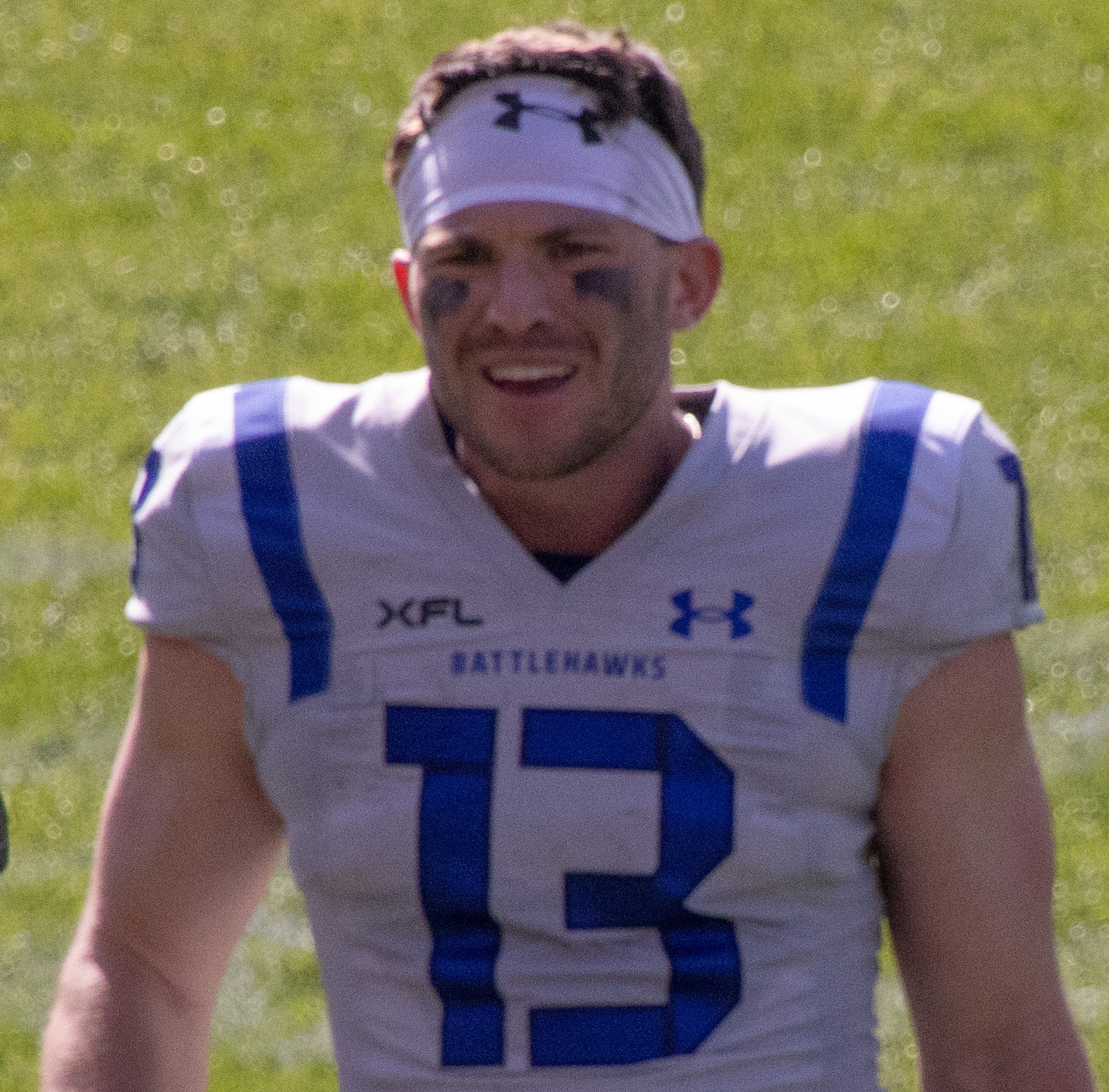
- Proehl with the St. Louis Battlehawks in 2023

St. Louis Battlehawks
- Title: Wide receivers coach

Personal information
- Born: October 11, 1995 (age 31); Charlotte, North Carolina, U.S.
- Listed height: 5 ft 9 in (1.75 m)
- Listed weight: 179 lb (81 kg)

Career information
- Position: Wide receiver (No. 13, 87)
- High school: Providence (Charlotte)
- College: North Carolina (2014–2017)
- NFL draft: 2018: 7th round, 255th overall pick

Career history

Playing
- Buffalo Bills (2018)*; Tennessee Titans (2018)*; Los Angeles Rams (2018–2019)*; Seattle Dragons (2020); San Francisco 49ers (2021)*; Los Angeles Chargers (2021)*; Buffalo Bills (2021)*; New York Giants (2022)*; St. Louis Battlehawks (2023)
- * Offseason or practice squad member only

Coaching
- Wingate (2025) Wide receivers coach; St. Louis Battlehawks (2026–present) Wide receivers coach
- Stats at Pro Football Reference

Austin Proehl (born October 11, 1995) is an American former professional football player who was a wide receiver in the National Football League (NFL). He played college football for the North Carolina Tar Heels. He is currently the wide receivers coach for the St. Louis Battlehawks of the United Football League (UFL).

== College career ==
Proehl played college football for University of North Carolina at Chapel Hill.

== Professional career ==
Pre-draft measurables
Height	Weight	Arm length	Hand span	20-yard shuttle	Three-cone drill	Vertical jump	Broad jump	Bench press
5 ft 9 1/8 in (1.76 m)	182 lb (83 kg)	28 7/8 in (0.73 m)	8 1/2 in (0.22 m)	4.07 s	6.75 s	34.0 in (0.86 m)	9 ft 5 in (2.87 m)	11 reps
All values from Pro Day

=== Buffalo Bills (first stint) ===
Proehl was selected by the Buffalo Bills in the seventh round (255th overall) of the 2018 NFL draft. He was waived on September 1, 2018.

=== Tennessee Titans ===
On September 3, 2018, Proehl was signed to the practice squad of the Tennessee Titans, but was released the following day.

=== Los Angeles Rams ===
On October 23, 2018, Proehl was signed to the Los Angeles Rams practice squad.

Proehl signed a reserve/future contract with the Rams on February 6, 2019. He was waived during final roster cuts on August 30, 2019.

=== Seattle Dragons ===
In October 2019, Proehl was drafted by the XFL to play for the Seattle Dragons. On February 8, 2020, Proehl caught 14-yard and 57-yard touchdown passes from Brandon Silvers, the former being the first touchdown in XFL history. He had his contract terminated when the league suspended operations on April 10, 2020.

Proehl had a tryout with the Chicago Bears on August 17, 2020.

=== San Francisco 49ers ===
On January 4, 2021, Proehl signed a reserve/future contract with the San Francisco 49ers. He was waived on May 17, 2021.

=== Los Angeles Chargers ===
On May 18, 2021, Proehl was claimed off waivers by the Los Angeles Chargers. He was waived on August 24, 2021 and re-signed to the practice squad on September 2. He was released on October 26.

=== Buffalo Bills (second stint) ===
On November 4, 2021, Proehl was signed to the Bills practice squad. He was released on November 16. He was re-signed on December 24. He was released on January 4, 2022.

=== New York Giants ===
On February 15, 2022, Proehl signed a reserve/future contract with the New York Giants. He was released on August 16, 2022.

=== St. Louis Battlehawks ===
Proehl was selected in the 11th round of the 2023 XFL Skill Players Draft, by the St. Louis Battlehawks. His wide receiver coach with the Battlehawks was his father, Ricky Proehl. He was not part of the roster after the 2024 UFL dispersal draft on January 15, 2024.

== Personal life ==
Austin is the brother of former Minnesota Vikings receiver Blake Proehl and the son of former NFL receiver Ricky Proehl. Ricky played college football at Wake Forest and played in the NFL from 1990 to 2006 for the Arizona Cardinals, Seattle Seahawks, Chicago Bears, St. Louis Rams, Carolina Panthers, and Indianapolis Colts.
