= Tom Hart (sportscaster) =

American sports commentator

- Born: Columbia, Missouri, U.S.
- Education: University of Missouri
- Occupation: Sports broadcaster
- Years active: 1999–present
- Children: 3

Tom Hart is an American sports announcer for ESPN. He attended Rock Bridge High School in Columbia, Missouri and is a graduate of the University of Missouri. Hart lives in Atlanta.

== Biography ==
Hart is a former field reporter on Braves Live, a pregame/postgame show for the Atlanta Braves. He calls college football and basketball for the ESPN family of networks after having performed the same role for the Big Ten Network from 2010 to 2012. Hart has also been the insider for college football and basketball on Fox Sports Radio and has been the play-by-play commentator and studio host for Comcast Sports Southeast. He also has served as a broadcaster for two minor league baseball teams: the Winston-Salem Warthogs and the Tennessee Smokies, where he also served as director of media relations.

== Career timeline ==
- 1999–2002 ISP Sports Network studio host
- 1999–2002 Winston-Salem Warthogs play-by-play
- 2002–2006 Tennessee Smokies play-by-play, director of media relations (where he was twice named Southern League Broadcaster of the Year)
- 2003–2011 Comcast Sports Southeast studio anchor, play-by-play for college football, basketball, and Southern League baseball
- 2004–2010 College Sports Television/CBS College Sports Network college football and basketball play-by-play
- 2008–2010 Fox Sports Radio college football and basketball insider
- 2010–2012 Big Ten Network college football and basketball play-by-play
- 2011–2014 Braves Live host, field reporter
- 2012–2014 ESPN College Football and College Basketball on ESPN play-by-play
- 2014–present SEC Network college football, basketball, and baseball play-by-play
- 2020–present MLB on ESPN play-by-play
- 2023–present XFL on ESPN/ABC lead play-by-play
- 2024-present Braves Fill in play-by-play on Radio and TV
