= Austin MacGinnis =

American football player (born 1995)

No. 18
- Position: Placekicker

Personal information
- Born: May 4, 1995 (age 31); Sacramento, California, U.S.
- Listed height: 5 ft 10 in (1.78 m)
- Listed weight: 185 lb (84 kg)

Career information
- High school: Prattville (Prattville, Alabama)
- College: Kentucky (2013–2017)
- NFL draft: 2018: undrafted

Career history
- Memphis Express (2019); Dallas Renegades (2020); Los Angeles Rams (2020); New Orleans Breakers (2022)

Awards and highlights
- First-team All-SEC (2014)
- Stats at Pro Football Reference

Austin MacGinnis (born May 4, 1995) is an American former football player. He played college football for the Kentucky Wildcats.

== College career ==
MacGinnis was a consensus first-team selection to the All-SEC team from 2014 to 2018. He broke the school single season record for field goals. MacGinnis was chosen by Phil Steele first-team preseason All-SEC for 2015.

== Professional career ==
=== Memphis Express ===
After attending the Chicago Bears rookie camp in 2018 and trying out for the team again in January 2019, MacGinnis returned to pro football when he was signed by the Memphis Express of the Alliance of American Football on February 27, 2019. In his debut against the San Diego Fleet, he kicked four field goals, including the game winner to secure a 26–23 Memphis win. He was eventually named AAF Player of the Week for Week 4. The league ceased operations in April 2019.

=== Dallas Renegades ===
MacGinnis was selected by the Dallas Renegades in the 2020 XFL supplemental draft on November 22, 2019. He had his contract terminated when the league suspended operations on April 10, 2020.

=== Los Angeles Rams ===
On April 13, 2020, MacGinnis signed a contract with the Los Angeles Rams of the National Football League. He was waived on September 4, 2020, after losing the kicker job to rookie Sam Sloman. He was re-signed to the Rams' practice squad on October 28, 2020. He was elevated to the active roster on December 10 for the team's week 14 game against the New England Patriots, and reverted to the practice squad after the game. On January 18, 2021, MacGinnis signed a reserve/futures contract with the Rams. He was waived on August 17, 2021.

=== New Orleans Breakers ===
MacGinnis was selected in the 32nd round of the 2022 USFL draft by the New Orleans Breakers. He was transferred to the team's inactive roster on May 5, 2022, and moved to the team's "did not report" list on May 8.
