= 2020 New York Guardians season =

American professional football season

- Owner: Alpha Entertainment, LLC
- General manager: Kevin Gilbride
- Head coach: Kevin Gilbride
- Home stadium: MetLife Stadium

Results
- Record: 3–2
- League place: Tie 1st XFL East

Uniform
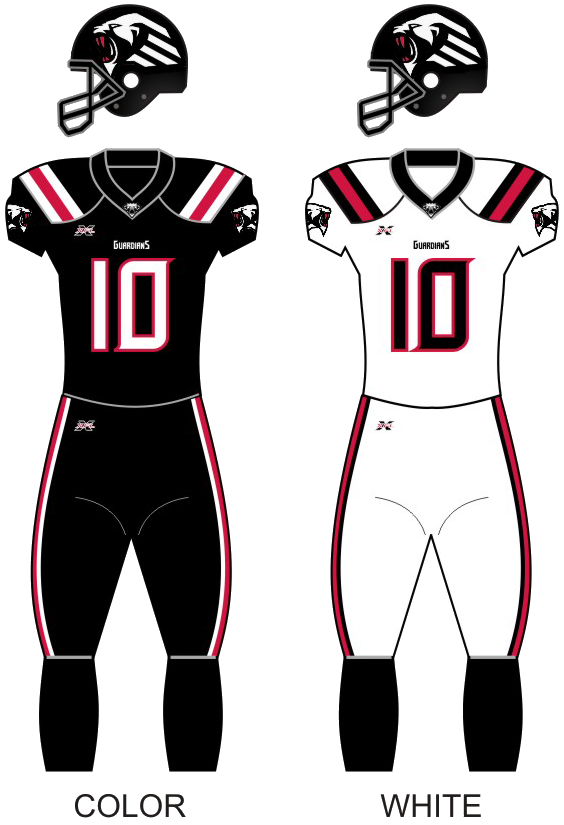

The 2020 New York Guardians season was the only season for the New York Guardians as a professional American football franchise. They played as charter members of the XFL, one of eight teams to compete in the league for the 2020 season. The Guardians played their home games at MetLife Stadium and were led by head coach Kevin Gilbride.

Their inaugural season was cut short due to the COVID-19 pandemic and the XFL officially suspended operations for the remainder of the season on March 20, 2020.

== Standings ==
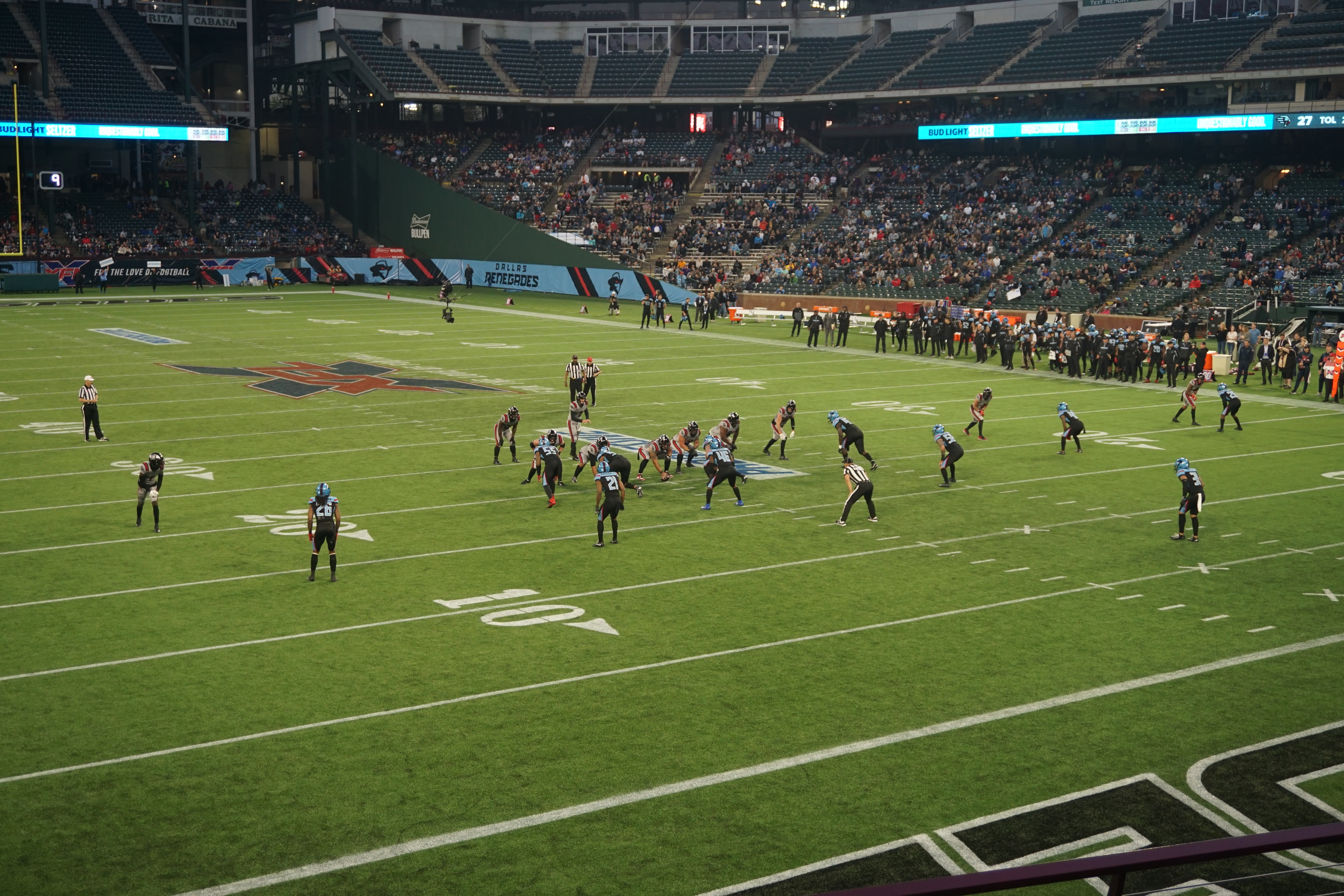
New York in action against Dallas

2020 XFL standings
East Division
Team	W	L	PCT	TD+/-	TD+	TD-	DIV	PF	PA	DIFF	STK
DC Defenders	3	2	.600	-3	9	12	2–1	82	89	-7	W1
St. Louis BattleHawks	3	2	.600	3	11	8	1–1	97	77	20	L1
New York Guardians	3	2	.600	-1	8	9	1–2	79	85	-6	W2
Tampa Bay Vipers	1	4	.200	-4	11	15	1–1	98	115	-17	L1
West Division
Team	W	L	PCT	TD+/-	TD+	TD-	DIV	PF	PA	DIFF	STK
Houston Roughnecks	5	0	1.000	7	21	14	3–0	158	111	47	W5
Dallas Renegades	2	3	.400	-3	9	12	2–1	90	102	-12	L2
Los Angeles Wildcats	2	3	.400	4	18	14	0–2	129	122	7	W1
Seattle Dragons	1	4	.200	-3	12	15	0–2	87	119	-32	L3
(x)–clinched playoff berth; (y)–clinched conference; (e)–eliminated from playoff contention

== Schedule ==
All times Eastern

Week	Day	Date	Kickoff	TV	Opponent	Results		Location
Week	Day	Date	Kickoff	TV	Opponent	Score	Record	Location
1	Sunday	February 9	2:00 p.m.	Fox	Tampa Bay Vipers	W 23–3	1–0	MetLife Stadium
2	Saturday	February 15	2:00 p.m.	ABC	at DC Defenders	L 0–27	1–1	Audi Field
3	Sunday	February 23	3:00 p.m.	ESPN	at St. Louis BattleHawks	L 9–29	1–2	The Dome at America's Center
4	Saturday	February 29	2:00 p.m.	ABC	Los Angeles Wildcats	W 17–14	2–2	MetLife Stadium
5	Saturday	March 7	5:00 p.m.	Fox	at Dallas Renegades	W 30–12	3–2	Globe Life Park in Arlington
6	Saturday	March 14	2:00 p.m.	ABC	Houston Roughnecks	Not played		MetLife Stadium
7	Sunday	March 22	3:00 p.m.	ABC	at Seattle Dragons	Not played		CenturyLink Field
8	Saturday	March 28	5:00 p.m.	Fox	St. Louis BattleHawks	Not played		MetLife Stadium
9	Saturday	April 4	2:00 p.m.	ABC	DC Defenders	Not played		MetLife Stadium
10	Sunday	April 12	6:00 p.m.	FS1	at Tampa Bay Vipers	Not played		Raymond James Stadium

== Final roster ==
2020 New York Guardians final roster
Quarterbacks: 4 Garrett Fugate; 14 Matt McGloin; 7 Luis Perez; 12 Marquise Williams; Running backs: 34 Matt Colburn; 20 Tim Cook; 23 Justin Stockton; 27 Darius Victor; Wide receivers: 10 Austin Duke; 19 Tanner Gentry; 2 Joe Horn Jr.; 1 Mekale McKay; 3 Colby Pearson; 18 Dalton Ponchillia; 9 Teo Redding; Tight ends: 88 E. J. Bibbs; 85 Keenen Brown; 87 Jake Powell; 83 Jake Sutherland	Offensive linemen: 64 Tony Adams G; 78 Anthony Coyle G; 63 Derek Dennis G; 74 Jarron Jones T; 70 John Kling T; 77 Damien Mama C; 69 Ian Silberman C; 75 Maea Teuhema G/C; 71 Brant Weiss T; 73 Avery Young G; Defensive linemen: 93 T. J. Barnes DT; 95 Toby Johnson DT; 94 Joey Mbu DT; 44 Ryan Mueller DE; 91 Jarrell Owens DE; 58 Bunmi Rotimi DE; 99 Cavon Walker DE; 55 Charles Wright DE	Linebackers: 59 Garret Dooley OLB; 47 Frank Ginda OLB/MLB; 56 Ben Heeney MLB; 45 D'Juan Hines OLB; 48 Jawuan Johnson OLB; 51 Darnell Leslie OLB; Defensive backs: 31 Terrence Alexander CB; 22 Dravon Askew-Henry CB; 36 Demetrious Cox SS; 33 A. J. Hendy SS; 29 Bryce Jones CB; 25 Jeremiah McKinnon CB; 26 DeJuan Neal CB; 30 Andrew Soroh FS; 21 Jamar Summers CB; 28 Wes Sutton FS; 24 Ranthony Texada CB; Special teams: 42 Scott Daly LS; 16 Matt McCrane K; 8 Justin Vogel P	Reserve lists: 68 Garrett Brumfield G (IR); 49 Nick DeLuca OLB (Left Squad); 5 J-Shun Harris WR (IR); 81 Garrett Hudson TE (IR); 67 Zac Kerin G (IR); 11 DeAngelo Yancey WR (IR); 92 Rykeem Yates DE (IR); 57 active, 7 inactive

== Staff ==
2020 New York Guardians staff
Front office: President – Janet Duch; Director of Player Personal – Alan "Trip" MacCracken; Director of Football Operations – John Peterson; Manager of Football Operations – Chris Thompson; Head coaches: Head coach/general manager – Kevin Gilbride; Offensive coaches: Quarterbacks – G. A. Mangus; Running backs – Jerald Ingram; Receivers – Mike Miller; Offensive line – Ronnie Vinklarik	Defensive coaches: Defensive coordinator – Jim Herrmann; Defensive line – C. J. Ah You; Linebackers – Kevin Kelly; Defensive backs – Chris Dishman; Special teams coaches: Special teams coordinator/quality control – Ray Rychleski/Jeff McInerney

== Season summary ==
The Guardians destroyed the Tampa Bay Vipers in the first game of the season, winning 23–3. The next week, however, they were shut out by the DC Defenders 27–0. They stumbled again in week 3, losing to the St. Louis BattleHawks 29–9. They stole a win from the Los Angeles Wildcats at home by 3 points, winning 17–14 with a change at the quarterback position, starting Luis Perez over Matt McGloin. This success continued into week 5, where the Guardians were able to defeat the Dallas Renegades on the road 30-12 before the season's abrupt end.

== Game summaries ==
=== Week 1: Tampa Bay Vipers ===
Week 1 — Tampa Bay at New York

Quarter	1	2	3	4	Total
Vipers	0	0	3	0	3
Guardians	7	10	0	6	23

at MetLife Stadium, East Rutherford, New Jersey

- Date: Sunday, February 9
- Game time: 2:00 p.m. EST
- Game weather: Cloudy • Temperature: 42 °F (6 °C) • Wind: E 6 mph
- Game attendance: 17,634
- Referee: Jeff Heaser
- TV announcers (Fox): Kevin Burkhardt (play-by-play), Greg Olsen (analyst), Jenny Taft (sideline)

Game information

First quarter

- NY – Matt McGloin 1-yard rush (1-pt. good), 9:55. Guardians 7–0. Drive: 8 plays, 48 yards, 5:08.

Second quarter

- NY – Matt McGloin 12-yard pass to Colby Pearson (1-pt good), 13:38. Guardians 14–0. Drive: 3 plays, 57 yards, 1:21.
- NY – Matt McCrane 49-yard field goal, 0:05. Guardians 17–0. Drive: 3 plays, 37 yards, 0:31.

Third quarter

- TB – Andrew Franks 23-yard field goal, 1:05. Guardians 17–3. Drive: 16 plays, 77 yards, 7:42.

Fourth quarter

- NY – Jamar Summers 27-yard fumble return (1-pt. failed), 12:09. Guardians 23–3.

Top passers

- TB – Aaron Murray – 16/34, 231 yards, TD, 2 INT
- NY – Matt McGloin – 15/29, 182 yards, TD

Top rushers

- TB – De'Veon Smith – 16 carries, 79 yards
- NY – Darius Victor – 9 carries, 32 yards

Top receivers

- TB – Daniel Williams – 6 receptions, 123 yards
- NY – Mekale McKay – 3 receptions, 58 yards

The Guardians started their inaugural season at home for Round 1 against the Vipers. Heading into halftime, the Guardians led 17–0. Though, the Vipers were able to get on the board in the third quarter, in the fourth quarter, the Guardians wrapped up the scoring of the game with a late touchdown (with a failed 1-point attempt) to make it 23–3. This would be the final score of the game.

With the win, the Guardians started their season 1–0.

=== Week 2: at DC Defenders ===
Week 2 — New York at DC

Quarter	1	2	3	4	Total
Guardians	0	0	0	0	0
Defenders	6	6	6	9	27

at Audi Field, Washington, D.C.

- Date: Saturday, February 15
- Game time: 2:00 p.m. EST
- Game weather: Partly cloudy • Temperature: 36 °F (2 °C) • Wind: S 9 mph
- Game attendance: 15,031
- Referee: John O'Neill
- TV announcers (ABC): Steve Levy (play-by-play), Greg McElroy (analyst), Tom Luginbill and Dianna Russini (sideline)

Game information

First quarter

- DC – DeAndre Thompkins 13-yard pass from Cardale Jones (1-pt. failed), 7:09. Defenders 6–0. Drive: 11 plays, 80 yards, 6:09.

Second quarter

- DC – Tyler Rausa 27-yard field goal, 11:19. Defenders 9–0. Drive: 13 plays, 51 yards, 7:31.
- DC – Tyler Rausa 36-yard field goal, 0:30. Defenders 12–0. Drive: 5 plays, 43 yards, 0:49.

Third quarter

- DC – Jameer Thurman 46-yard interception return (1-pt. failed), 10:07. Defenders 18–0.

Fourth quarter

- DC – Tyler Rausa 26-yard field goal, 7:22. Defenders 21–0. Drive: 13 plays, 54 yards, 7:28.
- DC – Derrick Hayward 6-yard pass from Cardale Jones, 1:29. Defenders 27–0. Drive: 5 plays, 49 yards, 1:57.

Top passers

- NY – Marquise Williams – 4/8, 51 yards
- DC – Cardale Jones – 23/37, 276 yards, 2 TD, INT

Top rushers

- NY – Tim Cook III – 10 rushes, 39 yards
- DC – Donnell Pumphrey – 12 rushes, 53 yards

Top receivers

- NY – Mekale McKay – 3 receptions, 30 yards
- DC – Rashad Ross – 4 receptions, 95 yards

In their first road game ever, the Guardians were shut out in Round 1 against the Defenders 27–0.

With the loss, the Guardians fell to 1–1.

=== Week 3: at St. Louis Battlehawks ===
Week 3 — New York at St. Louis

Quarter	1	2	3	4	Total
Guardians	0	3	0	6	9
BattleHawks	6	17	3	3	29

at The Dome at America's Center, St. Louis, Missouri

- Date: Saturday, February 15
- Game time: 3:00 p.m. EST
- Game weather: Partly sunny • Temperature: 61 °F (16 °C) • Wind: 9 mph
- Game attendance: 29,554
- Referee: Brandon Cruse
- TV announcers (ESPN): Tom Hart (play-by-play), Joey Galloway (analyst), Pat McAfee (field analyst)

Game information

First quarter

- STL – Christine Michael 14-yard rush (2-pt. failed), 13:17. BattleHawks 6–0. Drive: 4 plays, 72 yards, 1:49.

Second quarter

- NY – Matt McCrane 53-yard field goal, 12:31. BattleHawks 6–3. Drive: 7 plays, 30 yards, 3:51.
- STL – Joe Powell 84-yard kickoff return (2-pt. failed), 12:24. BattleHawks 12–3.
- STL – Taylor Russolino 39-yard field goal, 4:29. BattleHawks 15–3. Drive: 11 plays, 37 yards, 5:10.
- STL – Matt Jones 1-yard rush (2-pt. good), 1:12. BattleHawks 23–3. Drive: 5 plays, 17 yards, 0:57.

Third quarter

- STL – Taylor Russolino 58-yard field goal, 10:03. BattleHawks 26–3. Drive: 7 plays, 36 yards, 3:04.

Fourth quarter

- NY – Austin Duke 8-yard pass from Luis Perez (3-pt. failed), 6:19. BattleHawks 26–9. Drive: 5 plays, 40 yards, 2:17.
- STL – Taylor Russolino 36-yard field goal, 0:51. BattleHawks 29–9. Drive: 13 plays, 54 yards, 5:26.

Top passers

- NY – Marquise Williams – 7/15, 94 yards
- STL – Jordan Ta'amu – 12/18, 119 yards

Top rushers

- NY – Tim Cook III – 9 carries, 50 yards
- STL – Matt Jones – 15 carries, 95 yards, TD

Top receivers

- NY – Austin Duke – 4 receptions, 43 yards, 1 TD
- STL – Alonzo Russell – 3 receptions, 36 yards

After being shut out on the road, the Guardians traveled again this time for Round 1 against the Battlehawks. The Battlehawks scored the only points of the first quarter when Christine Michael ran for a 14-yard touchdown (with a failed point attempt) to make it 6–0. The Guardians got on the board in the second quarter when Matt McCrane kicked a 53-yard field goal to make it 6–3. The Battlehawks would go on a 17–0 run to take a 23–3 lead at halftime. They added to their run by scoring the only points of the third quarter when Taylor Russolino kicked a 58-yard field goal for a 26–3 lead. The Guardians scored again in the fourth quarter when Luis Perez found Austin Duke on an 8-yard touchdown pass (with a failed point attempt) to make it 26–9. Russolino closed out the scoring of the game with a 36-yard field goal as the Battlehawks won 29–9.

With the loss, the Guardians fell to 1–2.

=== Week 4: Los Angeles Wildcats ===
Week 4 — Los Angeles at New York

Quarter	1	2	3	4	Total
Wildcats	6	0	8	0	14
Guardians	3	11	0	3	17

at MetLife Stadium, East Rutherford, New Jersey

- Date: Saturday, February 29
- Game time: 2:00 p.m. EST
- Game weather: Sunny • Temperature: 41 °F (5 °C) • Wind: SE 13 mph
- Game attendance: 12,211
- Referee: James Carter
- TV announcers (ABC): Steve Levy (play-by-play), Greg McElroy (analyst), Tom Luginbill and Dianna Russini (sideline)

Game information

First quarter

- NY – Matt McCrane 51-yard field goal, 5:51. Guardians 3–0. Drive: 10 plays, 37 yards, 5:15.
- LA – Tre McBride 4-yard pass from Josh Johnson (2-pt. failed), 0:07. 'Wildcats 6–3. Drive: 10 plays, 68 yards, 5:43.

Second quarter

- NY – Matt McCrane 23-yard field goal, 8:15. Tied 6–6. Drive: 12 plays, 60 yards, 6:51.
- NY – Mekale McKay 3-yard pass from Luis Perez (2-pt. good), 1:31. Guardians 14–6. Drive: 10 plays, 63 yards, 4:32.

Third quarter

- LA – Saeed Blacknall 42-yard pass from Josh Johnson (2-pt. good), 4:45. Tied 14–14. Drive: 4 plays, 81 yards, 1:47.

Fourth quarter

- NY – Matt McCrane 47-yard field goal, 10:57. Guardians 17–14. Drive: 9 plays, 26 yards, 4:18.

Top passers

- LA – Josh Johnson – 25/40, 330 yards, 2 TD, INT
- NY – Luis Perez – 18/26, 150 yards, TD

Top rushers

- LA – DuJuan Harris – 5 carries, 25 yards
- NY – Darius Victor – 18 carries, 82 yards

Top receivers

- LA – Tre McBride – 8 receptions, 127 yards, 1 TD
- NY – Colby Pearson – 5 receptions, 34 yards

After another tough road loss, the Guardians went home to take on the Wildcats. The Guardians scored first in the first quarter when Matt McCrane kicked a 51-yard field goal to make it 3–0. Though, the Wildcats would take the lead when Josh Johnson found Tre McBride on a 4-yard pass (with a failed 2-point play) to make it 6–3. In the second quarter, it was all Guardians when they made it 14–6 at halftime. After the break, the Wildcats tied the game up at 14-14 when Josh Johnson found Saeed Blacknall on a 42-yard pass. However, in the fourth, quarter the Guardians would wrap the scoring up when McCrane kicked a 47-yard field goal to make the final score 17–14.

With the win, the Guardians improved to 2-2.

=== Week 5: at Dallas Renegades ===
Week 5 — New York at Dallas

Quarter	1	2	3	4	Total
Guardians	3	3	21	3	30
Renegades	3	3	6	0	12

at Globe Life Park in Arlington, Arlington, Texas

- Date: Saturday, March 7
- Game time: 5:00 p.m. EST
- Game attendance: 15,950
- Referee: Jeff Heaser
- TV announcers (Fox): Curt Menefee (play-by-play), Joel Klatt (analyst), Cam Jordan (sideline)

Game information

First quarter

- DAL – Austin MacGinnis 23-yard field goal, 9:32. Renegades 3–0. Drive: 12 plays, 62 yards, 5:32.
- NY – Matt McCrane 46-yard field goal, 6:43. Tied 3–3. Drive: 5 plays, 12 yards, 2:51.

Second quarter

- NY – Matt McCrane 39-yard field goal, 8:37. Guardians 6–3. Drive: 12 plays, 49 yards, 6:19.

Third quarter

- NY – Marquise Williams 1-yard rush (2-pt. failed), 10:57. Guardians 12-6. Drive: 8 plays, 76 yards, 4:07.
- NY – Colby Pearson 80-yard pass from Luis Perez (2-pt. good), 3:31. Guardians 20-6. Drive: 1 play, 80 yards, 0:14.
- NY – Ryan Mueller 33-yard interception return (1-pt. good), 02:48. Guardians 27-6.
- DAL – Austin Walter 97-yard kickoff return (3-pt. failed), 02:38. Guardians 27-12.

Fourth quarter

- NY – Matt McCrane 26-yard field goal, 8:51. Guardians 30–12. Drive: 9 plays, 27 yards, 5:18.

Top passers

- NY – Luis Perez – 16/30, 229 yards, 1 TD, 1 INT
- DAL – Philip Nelson – 28/49, 210, 2 INT

Top rushers

- NY – Darius Victor – 15 carries, 58 yards
- DAL – Cameron Artis-Payne – 6 carries, 25 yards

Top receivers

- NY – Colby Pearson – 5 receptions, 95 yards, 1 TD
- DAL – Flynn Nagel – 7 receptions, 46 yards

After a tough home win, the Guardians traveled to take on the Renegades. In the first quarter, the Renegades scored first when Austin MacGinnis kicked a 23-yard field goal to make it 3–0. The Guardians tied it up later on in the quarter when Matt McCrane kicked a 46-yard field goal to make it 3-3. In the second quarter, McCrane kicked a 39-yard field goal to make it 6–3. However, the Renegades tied it up before halftime when MacGinnis kicked a 36-yard field goal to make it 6-6. In the third quarter, the Guardians retook the lead when Marvin Williams ran for a 1-yard touchdown (with a failed point play) to make it 12–6. They would make it 20-6 when Luis Perez found Carl Pearson on an 80-yard touchdown pass. Philip Nelson was then intercepted by Ryan Mueller and it was returned 33 yards for a touchdown to make it 27–6. The Renegades then made it 27-12 after Austin Walter ran a kickoff 97 yards for a touchdown (with a failed point play) to close out the quarter. In a highly defensive fourth quarter, the Guardians scored the only points in what would be MacGinnis's fourth field goal from 26 yards out to make the final score 30–12.

With the win, the Guardians improved to 3–2.

After a huge win on the road, the Guardians were to return home for a game against the Roughnecks. However, this game, along with the remainder of their games were canceled due to the sudden rise of the COVID-19 pandemic.

Nevertheless, the Guardians managed to finish their first season with a winning record.
