= Wesley Sutton =

American gridiron football player (born 1996)

- Sutton with the Montreal Alouettes in 2026

No. 37 – Montreal Alouettes
- Position: Defensive back
- Roster status: Active
- CFL status: American

Personal information
- Born: February 9, 1996 (age 30); Chandler, Arizona, U.S.
- Listed height: 6 ft 0 in (1.83 m)
- Listed weight: 200 lb (91 kg)

Career information
- High school: Chandler
- College: Northern Arizona

Career history
- New York Guardians (2020); Montreal Alouettes (2021–present)

Awards and highlights
- Grey Cup champion (2023); 4× CFL East All-Star (2022, 2023, 2025, 2026)
- Stats at CFL.ca

Wesley Malik Sutton (born February 9, 1996) is an American professional football defensive back for the Montreal Alouettes of the Canadian Football League (CFL).

== College career ==
Sutton played college football for the Northern Arizona Lumberjacks from 2014 to 2018. He played in 42 games where he had 96 solo tackles, 56 assisted tackles, six interceptions, and one forced fumble.

== Professional career ==
Sutton was not selected in the 2019 NFL draft and was invited to rookie camp with the Philadelphia Eagles, but was not signed.

=== New York Guardians ===
After not playing football in 2019, Sutton signed with the New York Guardians ahead of the 2020 season. After making the gameday roster, he made his professional debut on February 9, 2020, against the Tampa Bay Vipers, where he had two sacks and a tackle for a loss. He had his contract terminated when the league suspended operations on April 10, 2020.

=== Montreal Alouettes ===
On March 22, 2021, it was announced that Sutton had signed with the Montreal Alouettes. He made the team's active roster following training camp and played in his first CFL game on August 14, 2021, against the Edmonton Elks where he had four defensive tackles. In the following game, on August 20, 2021, he recorded his first career interception on a pass from Jake Maier in a game against the Calgary Stampeders. After a promising start with two games played, Sutton spent the rest of the 2021 season on the injured list.

To begin the 2022 season, Sutton was named a starter at cornerback. In game 2, he moved to halfback where he also played through to the fourth game of the season. However, he struggled in the first game under new defensive coordinator, Noel Thorpe, in the fifth game of the season, where he committed three pass interference penalties for 108 yards in the loss to the Edmonton Elks. After retaining his starting position, he had an interception in week 9 against the Winnipeg Blue Bombers, the second of his career. In the following week, on August 11, 2022, he recorded the first two sacks and first forced fumble of his CFL career, along with five defensive tackles and one pass knockdown, in the win against the Blue Bombers and was named a CFL Top Performer that week. He finished the year having played in all 18 regular season games where he had 79 defensive tackles, one special teams tackle, four sacks, one interception, and two forced fumbles. He was named an East Division All-Star at the end of the year. Sutton and the Als agreed to a two-year contract extension on January 23, 2023.

== Personal life ==
Sutton was born to parents Marc and Theresa Sutton and has one sibling, Alyssa.
