= Texada =

Texada may refer to:

- Ranthony Texada (born 1995), American football player
- Tia Texada, American actress
- Texada Island in the Strait of Georgia, British Columbia, Canada
  - Texada/Gillies Bay Airport, on Texada Island

== See also ==
- Francisco Ximénez de Tejada (1703–1775), Spanish knight, Prince and Grand Master of the Order of Malta
