= Jarron Jones =

American football player (born 1994)

No. 77
- Position: Offensive tackle

Personal information
- Born: March 11, 1994 (age 32); Rochester, New York, U.S.
- Listed height: 6 ft 6 in (1.98 m)
- Listed weight: 316 lb (143 kg)

Career information
- High school: Aquinas Institute (Rochester, New York)
- College: Notre Dame
- NFL draft: 2017: undrafted

Career history
- New York Giants (2017)*; Seattle Seahawks (2017)*; Dallas Cowboys (2017–2018)*; New York Giants (2018)*; Tampa Bay Buccaneers (2018)*; Washington Redskins (2018)*; Detroit Lions (2018)*; Buffalo Bills (2019)*; New York Guardians (2020); Pittsburgh Steelers (2020–2021)*; Tampa Bay Bandits (2022); Memphis Showboats (2023–2024); Birmingham Stallions (2025)
- * Offseason or practice squad member only

Awards and highlights
- 2× All-USFL Team (2022, 2023)
- Stats at Pro Football Reference

Jarron Jones (born March 11, 1994) is an American former professional football offensive tackle. He played college football for Notre Dame with his brother Jamir Jones.

== Professional career ==
Pre-draft measurables
Height	Weight	Arm length	Hand span	40-yard dash	10-yard split	20-yard split	20-yard shuttle	Three-cone drill	Vertical jump	Broad jump	Bench press
6 ft 5 3/4 in (1.97 m)	316 lb (143 kg)	35 1/2 in (0.90 m)	10 1/2 in (0.27 m)	5.33 s	1.87 s	3.08 s	4.77 s	8.01 s	24.5 in (0.62 m)	8 ft 6 in (2.59 m)	22 reps
All values from NFL Combine/Pro Day

=== New York Giants (first stint) ===
After going unselected in the 2017 NFL draft, Jones was signed by the New York Giants as an undrafted free agent. On July 12, 2017, it was stated that the Giants were trying to convert him to offensive tackle. He was eventually cut on September 2, 2017.

=== Seattle Seahawks ===
Two days after being released by New York, Jones was signed by the Seattle Seahawks. On September 12, Jones was released from the Seattle Seahawks practice squad along with Kenny Lawler.

=== Dallas Cowboys ===
On September 19, 2017, Jones worked out with the Dallas Cowboys along with Caraun Reid, Jake Eldrenkamp, and others. A day later, he was signed to the practice squad. On May 21, 2018, Jones was waived by the Cowboys.

=== New York Giants (second stint) ===
On June 11, 2018, Jones was signed by the New York Giants alongside Kenneth Durden.

=== Tampa Bay Buccaneers ===
On August 7, 2018, Jones was signed by the Tampa Bay Buccaneers. On September 1, Jones was cut. 11 days later, he was signed to the practice squad. On October 15, Jones was released.

=== Washington Redskins ===
On November 6, 2018, Jones was signed by the Washington Redskins. On November 19, he was released.

=== Detroit Lions ===
On December 12, 2018, Jones was signed to the practice squad by the Detroit Lions. On December 31, he signed a futures deal with Detroit.

=== Buffalo Bills ===
On August 6, 2019, Jones was signed by the Buffalo Bills. He was cut on August 31.

=== New York Guardians ===
In October 2019, Jones was drafted by the New York Guardians in the 2020 XFL draft.

=== Pittsburgh Steelers ===
On March 25, 2020, Jones was signed by the Pittsburgh Steelers along with Cavon Walker. On September 5, 2020, he was cut. A day later, Jones was re-signed to the practice squad. He was placed on injured reserve on December 29. On January 4, 2021, Jones was signed to a futures contract. He was waived on July 20.

On October 18, 2021 Jones was suspended 10 games after pleading guilty in domestic violence case.

=== Tampa Bay Bandits ===
On March 10, 2022, Jones was drafted by the Tampa Bay Bandits of the United States Football League. On June 16, 2022, it was announced that Jones was selected as the offensive tackle for the inaugural All-USFL team. On June 17, he was transferred to inactive roster.

=== Memphis Showboats ===
Jones and all other Tampa Bay Bandits players were all transferred to the Memphis Showboats after it was announced that the Bandits were taking a hiatus and that the Showboats were joining the league.

=== Birmingham Stallions ===
On January 30, 2025, Jones signed with the Birmingham Stallions of the United Football League (UFL). He was released from injured reserve on June 2, 2025.
