= D'Juan Hines =

American football player (born 1994)

No. 4, 59
- Position: Linebacker

Personal information
- Born: September 13, 1994 (age 32); Houston, Texas, U.S.
- Listed height: 6 ft 1 in (1.85 m)
- Listed weight: 235 lb (107 kg)

Career information
- High school: Dekaney (Houston)
- College: Houston
- NFL draft: 2018: undrafted

Career history
- Los Angeles Chargers (2018)*; Cleveland Browns (2018); Kansas City Chiefs (2019)*; New York Guardians (2020); Ottawa Redblacks (2021); New Jersey Generals (2022–2023); Houston Roughnecks (2024)
- * Offseason or practice squad member only

Awards and highlights
- First-team All-AAC (2017)

Career NFL statistics
- Total tackles: 4
- Stats at Pro Football Reference

D'Juan Marques Hines (born September 13, 1994) is an American former professional football player who was a linebacker in the National Football League (NFL). He played college football for the Houston Cougars.

== Early life ==
Hines played quarterback at Dekaney High School, starting his junior and senior year. During his senior season, Hines accumulated 1,269 passing yards and 12 touchdowns while running for 388 yards and six touchdowns and was number 23 quarterback recruit in the nation by ESPN. Hines committed to the University of Houston as an athlete.

== College career ==
After redshirting his freshman season, during which time he played wide receiver, Hines played four seasons with the Cougars. He saw action on special teams and as a reserve player at safety until moving to linebacker and becoming a starter during the 2016 season. His senior season, Hines led the team with 110 tackles, which was third in the AAC, and three forced fumbles and was named to the 1st Team All-AAC. In total, Hines had 171 tackles, eight tackles for loss, three forced fumbles, three passes defensed and an interception in four seasons. Hines was also a four-time Academic All-America selection during his time with the Cougars.

== Professional career ==
=== Los Angeles Chargers ===
Hines was signed by Los Angeles Chargers as an undrafted free agent on May 11, 2018. He was subsequently waived by the Chargers on September 1, 2018, and signed to their practice squad the following day.

=== Cleveland Browns ===
Hines was signed off the Chargers' practice squad by the Cleveland Browns to their active roster on September 22. He made his NFL debut on September 30, 2018, against the Oakland Raiders. During his rookie season Hines played in 13 games, appearing exclusively on special teams, and made four tackles. He was waived on May 3, 2019.

=== Kansas City Chiefs ===
On June 14, 2019, Hines signed with the Kansas City Chiefs. Hines was waived by the Chiefs during final roster cuts on August 31, 2019.

=== New York Guardians ===
Hines was selected by the New York Guardians in round 6 of phase 3 of the 2020 XFL draft. He had his contract terminated when the league suspended operations on April 10, 2020.

Hines had a tryout with the Green Bay Packers on August 17, 2020.

=== Ottawa Redblacks ===
Hines was signed by the Ottawa Redblacks of the Canadian Football League on January 18, 2021.

=== New Jersey Generals ===
Hines re-signed with the New Jersey Generals on July 16, 2023. The Generals folded when the XFL and USFL merged to create the United Football League (UFL).

=== Houston Roughnecks ===
On May 15, 2024, Hines signed with the Houston Roughnecks of the United Football League (UFL). He was released on July 23, 2024.
