= Trip MacCracken =

Jacksonville Jaguars
- Title: Director of Roster Management

Personal information
- Born: June 30, 1974 (age 52); Akron, Ohio

Career information
- College: Hamilton College; Duke

Career history
- Cleveland Browns (1999–2009) Salary cap manager; Kansas City Chiefs (2010–2017) Director of football administration; Senior Bowl (2017–2018) College scouting consultant; Arizona Hotshots (2018–2019) Director of player personnel; New York Guardians (2019–2020) Director of player personnel; Jacksonville Jaguars (2021-2023) Director of roster management; Jacksonville Jaguars (2023-Present) Director of player finance

Alan "Trip" MacCracken (born June 30, 1974) is currently the Director of Player Finance for the Jacksonville Jaguars.

MacCracken graduated from Hawken School, where he captained the football and baseball teams, and became an undergraduate at Hamilton College. During his junior year, he went off campus to do an internship at the White House. While in Washington, MacCracken also found work as an intern with the Washington Redskins. After Hamilton, MacCracken continued his work with the Redskins while receiving his J.D. at Duke Law School. He also spent a summer working for the NFL Management Council, which represents ownership in the Collective Bargaining Agreement. Upon graduation from law school in 1999, MacCracken joined the Cleveland Browns for their first season as an expansion team. He spent eleven years with the Cleveland Browns, where he was in charge of managing the salary cap and the team's chief contract negotiator. He was hired by the Kansas City Chiefs in 2010 as Director of Football Administration. He was fired by the Chiefs in May 2017. He joined the Guardians of the newly-formed XFL in 2019 as Director of Player Personnel.
