= Anthony Coyle (American football) =

American football player (born 1996)

No. 78, 68
- Position: Offensive tackle

Personal information
- Born: September 19, 1996 (age 30); Staten Island, New York, U.S.
- Listed height: 6 ft 4 in (1.93 m)
- Listed weight: 298 lb (135 kg)

Career information
- High school: Tottenville (Staten Island, New York)
- College: Fordham
- NFL draft: 2018: undrafted

Career history
- Houston Texans (2018)*; Green Bay Packers (2018–2019)*; Atlanta Falcons (2019)*; New York Guardians (2020); Pittsburgh Steelers (2020); Indianapolis Colts (2021)*
- * Offseason or practice squad member only

Awards and highlights
- Mid-season All-XFL (2020)
- Stats at Pro Football Reference

Anthony Coyle (born September 19, 1996) is an American former football offensive tackle. He played college football at Fordham.

== Early life ==
Coyle attended Tottenville High School in Staten Island. He began his high school career at nose tackle, but switched to the offensive line as a junior. Coyle earned the Sal Somma Award as Staten Island's top offensive lineman in 2013.

== College career ==
Coyle played college football at Fordham and played in 48 games. He started 10 games at right tackle as a freshman in 2014 before switching to left tackle as a sophomore and starting 34 games at that position. Coyle earned Phil Steele NCAA FCS Freshman All-America honors and was named to the Second-team All-Patriot League during his sophomore season. As a junior and senior, he was named to the First-team All-Patriot League. He allowed seven sacks in four years at Fordham.

== Professional career ==
Pre-draft measurables
Height	Weight	Arm length	Hand span	40-yard dash	10-yard split	20-yard split	20-yard shuttle	Three-cone drill	Vertical jump	Broad jump	Bench press
6 ft 4 3/8 in (1.94 m)	298 lb (135 kg)	32 1/4 in (0.82 m)	10 1/4 in (0.26 m)	5.20 s	1.84 s	3.12 s	4.79 s	7.71 s	27.0 in (0.69 m)	8 ft 3 in (2.51 m)	29 reps
All values from Pro Day

=== Houston Texans ===
After going undrafted in 2018, Coyle signed as an undrafted free agent to the Houston Texans. He was waived on September 1, 2018.

=== Green Bay Packers ===
On September 25, he was signed by the Green Bay Packers to their practice squad. Coyle was placed on the practice squad injured list on November 28. During a preseason game in August 2019, Coyle had two holding penalties. He was released by the Packers on August 31.

=== Atlanta Falcons ===
On November 5, Coyle was signed by the Atlanta Falcons to their practice squad.

=== New York Guardians ===
Coyle was selected in the fourth round of the 2020 XFL draft by the New York Guardians. He served as a starting guard for the Guardians. He had his contract terminated when the league suspended operations on April 10, 2020.

=== Pittsburgh Steelers ===
On April 16, 2020, he was signed by the Pittsburgh Steelers. He was waived on September 5, 2020, and signed to the practice squad the next day. He was elevated to the active roster on December 2, December 7, and January 2, 2021, for the team's weeks 12, 13, and 17 games against the Baltimore Ravens, Washington Football Team, and Cleveland Browns, and reverted to the practice squad after each game. On January 14, 2021, Coyle signed a reserve/futures contract with the Steelers. He was waived/injured on August 4, 2021, and placed on injured reserve. Six days later, he was released from the injured reserve with an injury settlement.

=== Indianapolis Colts ===
On September 14, 2021, Coyle was signed to the Indianapolis Colts practice squad. He was released on October 15.

== Personal life ==
Coyle's twin brother Robert played football at Fairleigh Dickinson. Coyle has a fiancée, Emily, and a son Anthony, born in December 2019.
