= Dravon Askew-Henry =

American football player (born 1995)

No. 29, 6
- Position: Safety

Personal information
- Born: October 24, 1995 (age 31); Aliquippa, Pennsylvania, U.S.
- Listed height: 6 ft 0 in (1.83 m)
- Listed weight: 203 lb (92 kg)

Career information
- High school: Aliquippa
- College: West Virginia
- NFL draft: 2019: undrafted

Career history
- Pittsburgh Steelers (2019)*; New York Guardians (2020); New York Giants (2020)*; New Jersey Generals (2022–2023); St. Louis Battlehawks (2024)
- * Offseason or practice squad member only

Dravon Askew-Henry (born October 24, 1995) is an American former professional football safety. He played college football for the West Virginia Mountaineers.

== Early life ==
Askew-Henry attended Aliquippa High School. He compiled 5,454 rushing yards in his career and was a two-time Pennsylvania Class 2A first-team all-state selection. He was one of the top recruits in Pennsylvania and signed with West Virginia.

== College career ==
Askew-Henry started a school-record 51 games in four seasons at West Virginia. As a true freshman in 2014, he started 13 games and compiled 45 tackles (36 solo) and two interception. Askew-Henry posted 59 tackles and one interception as a sophomore. Coming into the 2016 season, he was one of three returning starters on defense but was forced to redshirt the 2016 season after sustaining an ACL tear in the preseason. Askew-Henry was the team's fourth-leading tackler as a junior with 57 tackles (42 solo), 2.5 tackles for loss, and one interception, earning him Honorable Mention All-Big 12 honors. As a senior, he made 54 tackles (37 solo), including five tackles for loss, and intercepted two passes. Askew-Henry was named Honorable Mention All-Big 12 for the second consecutive season. In his career, he tallied 215 tackles (162 solo), 9.5 tackles for loss, six interceptions and 10 pass breakups.

== Professional career ==
Pre-draft measurables
Height	Weight	Arm length	Hand span	40-yard dash	10-yard split	20-yard split	20-yard shuttle	Three-cone drill	Vertical jump	Broad jump	Bench press
5 ft 10 3/4 in (1.80 m)	202 lb (92 kg)	30 1/8 in (0.77 m)	8 7/8 in (0.23 m)	4.52 s	1.62 s	2.62 s	4.47 s	7.21 s	35.0 in (0.89 m)	10 ft 1 in (3.07 m)	18 reps
All values from Pro Day

=== Pittsburgh Steelers ===
Despite being given a fifth-to-seventh round grade, Askew-Henry went undrafted in the 2019 NFL draft. Askew-Henry signed with the Pittsburgh Steelers on April 27, 2019. He was waived on August 31 during final roster cuts.

=== New York Guardians ===
Askew-Henry signed with the New York Guardians of the XFL after being selected with the 31st overall selection in Phase Four of the 2020 XFL draft. He made a season-high five tackles (three solo) in his XFL debut against the Tampa Bay Vipers. Against the Los Angeles Wildcats, he was involved in a play in which he was called for a holding penalty and caught the penalty flag after the official tossed it. Askew-Henry tossed the flag back, but was hit with the holding call as well as a 15-yard unsportsmanlike conduct. The season was terminated early due to the coronavirus pandemic. In four games, Askew-Henry had 12 tackles (10 solo) and six pass breakups. He had his contract terminated when the league suspended operations on April 10, 2020.

=== New York Giants ===
On April 16, 2020, Askew-Henry signed with the New York Giants. The deal was reportedly a two-year contract for $1.39 million with no signing bonus and base salary of $610,000. He was waived on September 5, 2020.

=== New Jersey Generals ===
Askew-Henry was selected in the 19th round of the 2022 USFL draft by the New Jersey Generals. He re-signed with the team on July 11, 2023. The Generals folded when the XFL and USFL merged to create the United Football League (UFL).

=== St. Louis Battlehawks ===
On January 15, 2024, Askew-Henry was selected by the St. Louis Battlehawks with the fourth overall pick in the Super Draft portion of the 2024 UFL dispersal draft. He re-signed with the Battlehawks on August 5, 2024. He was released on March 20, 2025.

Askew-Henry retired.

== Personal life ==
Askew-Henry's cousin by marriage is Pro Bowl cornerback Darrelle Revis. He has trained with Revis and considers him a mentor.
