= Jamar Summers =

American football player (born 1995)

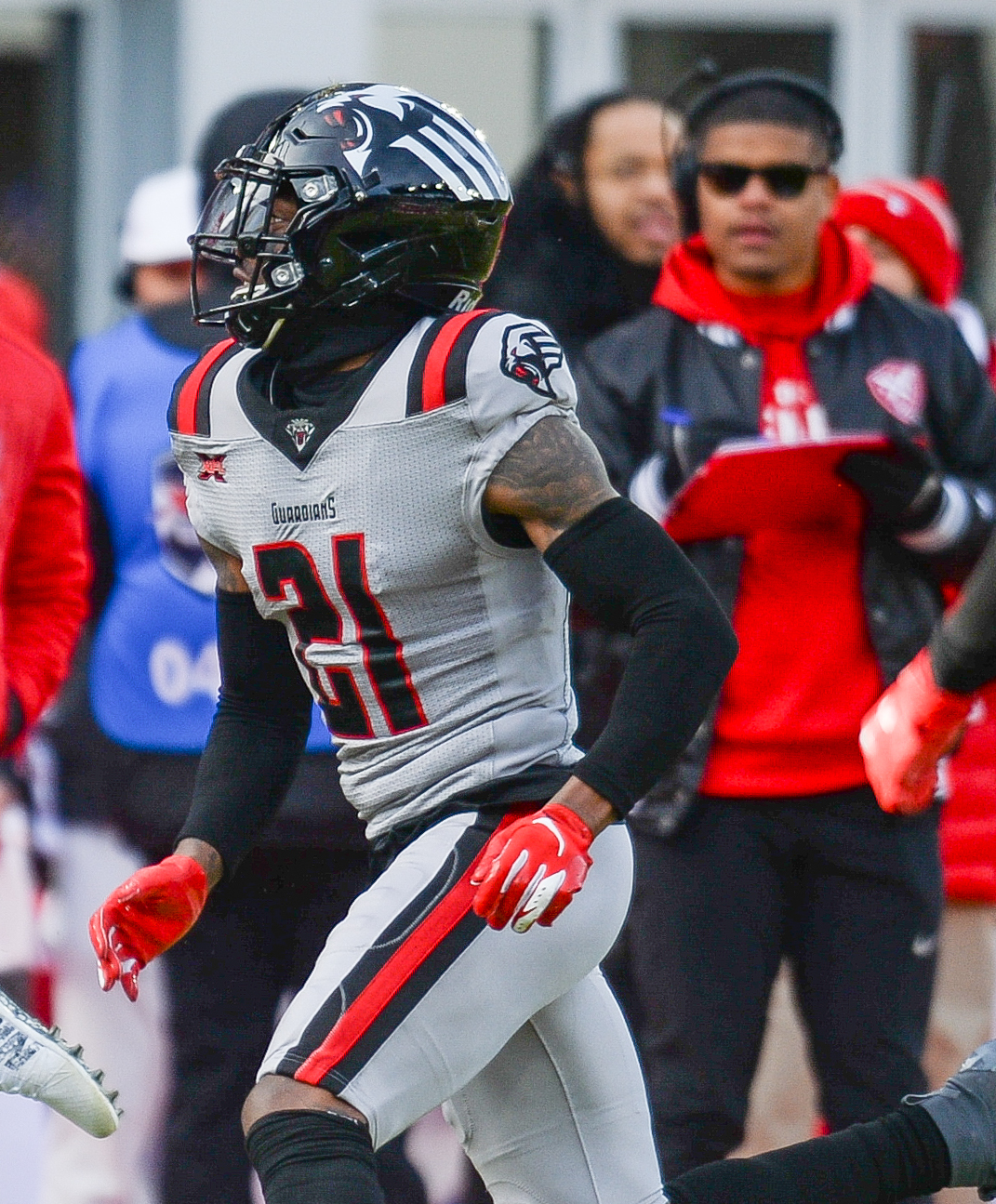
- Summers with the New York Guardians in 2020

Profile
- Position: Cornerback

Personal information
- Born: June 14, 1995 (age 31); Orange, New Jersey, U.S.
- Listed height: 5 ft 11 in (1.80 m)
- Listed weight: 193 lb (88 kg)

Career information
- High school: Orange
- College: UConn
- NFL draft: 2018: undrafted

Career history
- Pittsburgh Steelers (2018)*; Birmingham Iron (2019); Miami Dolphins (2019)*; Detroit Lions (2019)*; New York Guardians (2020); Houston Gamblers (2022); Vegas Vipers (2023); Arlington Renegades (2024–2025)
- * Offseason or practice squad member only

Jamar Summers (born June 14, 1995) is an American football cornerback. He played college football at University of Connecticut.

== Early life ==
Summers grew up in Orange, New Jersey, where he attended Orange High School. After graduating, he spent a year at post-secondary school Milford Academy in New Berlin, New York. As a cornerback, he was rated a three-star recruit by Rivals.com and a two-star recruit by ESPN and committed to play college football at Connecticut.

== College career ==
Summers played all twelve games as a true freshman, starting the final five of the season. In his sophomore year, he started twelve of thirteen games, recording eight interceptions and 39 tackles, including a 67-yard interception return for a touchdown, earning first-team All-American Athletic Conference honors.

As a junior, he started all twelve games, playing both cornerback and safety, recording two interceptions and 59 tackles, plus an 86-yard fumble recovery for a touchdown. Finally, as a senior, he recorded a career-high 63 tackles, in addition to one interception.

== Professional career ==
Pre-draft measurables
Height	Weight	Arm length	Hand span	40-yard dash	10-yard split	20-yard split	20-yard shuttle	Three-cone drill	Vertical jump	Broad jump	Bench press
5 ft 10 5/8 in (1.79 m)	193 lb (88 kg)	31 7/8 in (0.81 m)	9 1/4 in (0.23 m)	4.55 s	1.53 s	2.61 s	4.22 s	6.85 s	37.5 in (0.95 m)	10 ft 5 in (3.18 m)	14 reps
All values from Connecticut's Pro Day

=== Pittsburgh Steelers ===
After going undrafted in the 2018 NFL draft, Summers signed as an undrafted free agent with the Pittsburgh Steelers. He played in all four preseason games, allowing three receptions with two pass breakups on ten targets, but was cut prior to the regular season.

=== Birmingham Iron ===
On October 12, 2018, Summers was signed by the Birmingham Iron. In his debut against the Memphis Express, he allowed one reception for -2 yards, along with one interception and one pass breakup on three targets. He again impressed in week 2 against the Salt Lake Stallions, when he forced a fumble on a punt return that was recovered by teammate Shaheed Salmon for a touchdown, sparking a comeback victory for the Iron. For this, he was named Week 2 AAF Special Teams Player of the Week.

=== Miami Dolphins ===
After the AAF ceased operations in April 2019, Summers signed with the Miami Dolphins on May 12, 2019. He was waived on July 21, 2019.

=== Detroit Lions ===
On August 12, 2019, Summers signed with the Detroit Lions. He was waived during final roster cuts on August 30, 2019.

=== New York Guardians ===
Summers was drafted in the 1st round during phase four in the 2020 XFL draft by the New York Guardians. He had his contract terminated when the league suspended operations on April 10, 2020.

=== Houston Gamblers ===
Summers was selected in the eight round of the 2022 USFL draft by the Houston Gamblers. He was transferred to the inactive roster on April 30, 2022, with a leg injury. He was moved back to the active roster on May 14.

=== Vegas Vipers ===
Summers was signed by the Vegas Vipers of the XFL on March 28, 2023. He was waived in July 2023.

=== Arlington Renegades ===
On July 10, 2023, Summers was claimed off waivers by the Arlington Renegades. He re-signed with the team on January 29, 2024, and again on September 27, 2024.

=== Statistics ===
Year	Team	League	Games		Tackles				Interceptions				
Year	Team	League	GP	GS	Comb	Total	Ast	Sack	INT	Yds	Avg	Lng	TD
2019	BIR	AAF	2	2	6	4	2	0.0	3	10	3.3	10	0
2020	NY	XFL	5	3	13	16	3	0.0	1	16	16.0	16	0
2023	LV	XFL	4	4	8	14	6	0.0	1	0	0.0	0	0
Career			11	9	27	34	11	0.0	3	26	8.6	16	0
