= A. J. Hendy =

American football player (born 1993)

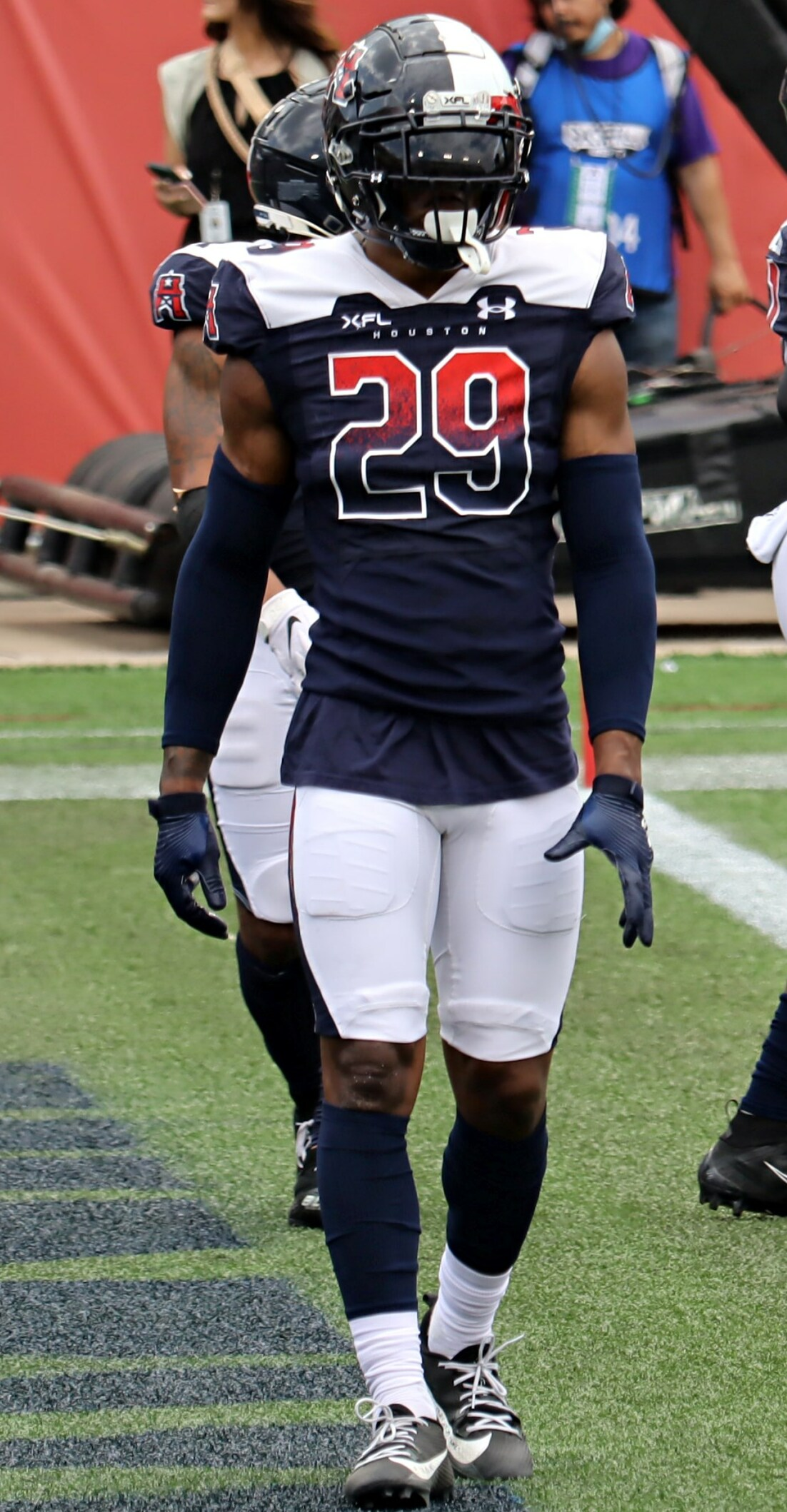
- Hendy with the Houston Roughnecks in 2023

No. 29, 33
- Position: Safety

Personal information
- Born: April 8, 1993 (age 33); Gaithersburg, Maryland, U.S.
- Listed height: 6 ft 0 in (1.83 m)
- Listed weight: 209 lb (95 kg)

Career information
- High school: Bowie (Bowie, Maryland)
- College: Maryland (2011–2015)
- NFL draft: 2016: undrafted

Career history
- Miami Dolphins (2016); Los Angeles Chargers (2017–2018)*; Houston Texans (2018); Houston Texans (2019)*; New York Guardians (2020); Saskatchewan Roughriders (2020–2022); Houston Roughnecks (2023); San Antonio Brahmas (2024)
- * Offseason or practice squad member only
- Stats at Pro Football Reference

Jeremiah "A.J." Hendy (born April 8, 1993) is an American former professional football player who was a safety in the National Football League (NFL). He played college football for the Maryland Terrapins. After going undrafted in the 2016 NFL draft, he signed with the Miami Dolphins of the NFL. He also played for the Los Angeles Chargers and Houston Texans (NFL). Additionally, he had stints with the New York Guardians, Houston Roughnecks, and San Antonio Brahmas of the XFL, and Saskatchewan Roughriders of the Canadian Football League (CFL).

== Early life ==
Hendy attended Bowie High School. While there, he played on offense, defense, and special teams for the football team. As a junior, he recorded 41 receptions for 464 yards and seven touchdowns. He was named overall Most Valuable Player (MVP), and won the Combine King and Fastest Man awards at the Baltimore Combine. He was also a two-time state high jump champion. As a senior, he recorded 592 receiving yards and seven touchdowns. He also recorded 30 tackles and five interceptions. As well as three punt returns for touchdowns. He was a team captain, and a 2010 second-team Big School All-State selection. He was rated as the 32 overall cornerback in the nation by Rivals.com, as well as the eighth overall player in Maryland. SuperPrep ranked him 12th in the Mid-Atlantic 49. He was ranked as the 87th best athlete in the nation by Scouts, Inc. and the 62nd wide receiver by Scout.com. He was recruited by Maryland, Iowa, North Carolina State, and Virginia.

== College career ==
Hendy then attended the University of Maryland, majoring in criminology and criminal justice. As a true freshman in 2011, he became only the second true freshman to start a safety since 1993. That season, he appeared in nine games (three starts). He recorded 30 tackles (20 solo.), one tackle-for-loss, one interception, one pass defensed, and one fumble recovery. In 2012, as a sophomore, he appeared in eight games. He recorded four tackles for the season. As a junior in 2013, he appeared in 12 games. He recorded 32 tackles (20 solo.), one tackle-for-loss, one interception, two passes defensed, and two fumble recoveries. In 2014, he redshirt the season. As a redshirt senior in 2015, he started all 12 games. He recorded 76 tackles (48 solo.), one tackle-for-loss, four passes defensed, and one fumble recovery.

== Professional career ==
Pre-draft measurables
Height	Weight	40-yard dash	10-yard split	20-yard split	20-yard shuttle	Three-cone drill	Vertical jump	Broad jump	Bench press
6 ft 0 in (1.83 m)	208 lb (94 kg)	4.56 s	1.53 s	2.58 s	4.16 s	7.03 s	40 1/2 in (1.03 m)	11 ft 3 in (3.43 m)	16 reps
All values from Maryland pro day.

=== Miami Dolphins ===
After going undrafted in the 2016 NFL draft, Hendy signed with the Miami Dolphins on May 6, 2016.He recorded an interception in his first preseason appearance against the New York Giants. He was released during final cuts on September 3. On September 5, he was signed to the Dolphins' practice squad. On December 28, he was promoted to the Dolphins' active roster. He made his professional debut during Week 17 against the New England Patriots, playing special teams.

On September 2, 2017, Hendy was waived by the Dolphins.

=== Los Angeles Chargers ===
On October 11, 2017, Hendy was signed to the Los Angeles Chargers' practice squad. He signed a reserve/future contract with the Chargers on January 1, 2018.

On September 1, 2018, Hendy was waived by the Chargers and signed to the practice squad the following day.

=== Houston Texans ===
On January 2, 2019, Hendy was signed by the Houston Texans off the Chargers' practice squad. He was waived on July 27, re-signed on August 3, and released on August 30.

=== New York Guardians ===
Hendy was selected by the New York Guardians in the 2020 XFL Supplemental Draft on November 22, 2019. He was named Co-Defensive Captain. Hendy had his contract terminated when the league suspended operations on April 10, 2020.

=== Saskatchewan Roughriders ===
Hendy signed with the Saskatchewan Roughriders of the CFL on May 4, 2020. After the CFL canceled the 2020 season due to the COVID-19 pandemic, Hendy chose to opt-out of his contract with the Roughriders on August 31. He opted back in to his contract with the Roughriders on December 21.

Hendy was placed on the suspended list on May 20, 2021, and reinstated on July 3. He played in 14 games for the Riders during the 2021 season, contributing with 14 defensive tackles, seven special teams tackles and one interception. Hendy re-signed with the Riders on March 28, 2022. He was cut after training camp the following June.

=== Houston Roughnecks ===
On November 17, 2022, Hendy was selected by the Houston Roughnecks of the XFL. The Roughnecks brand was transferred to the Houston Gamblers when the XFL and USFL merged to create the United Football League (UFL).

=== San Antonio Brahmas ===
On January 15, 2024, Hendy was selected by the San Antonio Brahmas in the eighth round of the Super Draft portion of the 2024 UFL dispersal draft. He signed with the team on January 23.
