= Taylor Russolino =

American gridiron football player (born 1989)

Profile
- Position: Placekicker

Personal information
- Born: May 23, 1989 (age 37); Metairie, Louisiana, U.S.
- Listed height: 6 ft 0 in (1.83 m)
- Listed weight: 180 lb (82 kg)

Career information
- High school: Archbishop Rummel (LA)
- College: Millsaps
- NFL draft: 2011: undrafted

Career history
- Marion Blue Racers (2013); New Orleans VooDoo (2014); Spokane Empire (2016); Shanghai Skywalkers (2016); Montreal Alouettes (2017); BC Lions (2019)*; St. Louis Battlehawks (2020); Denver Broncos (2020); Arlington Renegades (2023–2024)
- * Offseason or practice squad member only

Awards and highlights
- XFL champion (2023); First-team All-SCAC (2008); 2× Second-team All-SCAC (2009, 2010); Mid Season All-XFL (2020)

Career NFL statistics
- Field goals: 0
- Field goals attempted: 1
- Field goal %: 0
- Touchbacks: 1
- Stats at Pro Football Reference

Career CFL statistics
- Field goals: 2
- Field goal attempts: 3
- Longest field goal: 19
- Punts: 19
- Punt average: 38.3
- Stats at CFL.ca

Career AFL statistics
- Field goals: 0
- Field goals attempted: 1
- Extra points: 11
- Extra points attempted: 18
- Stats at ArenaFan.com

Taylor Russolino (born May 23, 1989) is an American gridiron football placekicker. He kicked an XFL-record 58-yard field goal during the 2020 XFL season.

== Early life and college ==
A native of Metairie, Louisiana, Russolino did not play football until his senior year of high school. Originally a soccer player, Russolino was approached by the high school football coach and soccer coach to kick for the football team as their normal kicker was playing in a baseball playoff tournament. After participating in a Ray Guy kicking camp, he dropped soccer after receiving advice from NFL kicker John Carney to pursue a football career.

Russolino played college football at Millsaps College at the Division III level, where he was a three-time all-conference selection, and setting multiple kicking records for the program.

== Professional career ==
=== Early career ===
Russolino signed his first professional contract with the Marion Blue Racers of the Continental Indoor Football League in 2013. He signed with the New Orleans VooDoo of the Arena Football League in February 2014. He played in three games, going 11-for-18 on extra point attempts and missed his only field goal attempt. He was placed on injured reserve on April 9, 2014.

Russolino signed with the Spokane Empire of the Indoor Football League in March 2016. Russolino was drafted by the Shanghai Skywalkers in the China Arena Football League draft in June 2016. Russolino was named to the All-Pro South Division All-Stars. He was also one of eight players named to the CAFL Fan's Dream Team.

=== Canadian Football League ===
Russolino signed with the Montreal Alouettes of the Canadian Football League (CFL) on October 26, 2017, to replace their injured regular kicker Boris Bede. Russolino played in two games, punting 19 times for an average of 38.3 yards per punt, and making two of his three field goal attempts. He was released on November 30, 2017.

Russolino signed with the BC Lions of the CFL during training camp on May 18, 2019, and was released before the season on May 30, 2019.

=== St. Louis BattleHawks ===
Russolino was added to the St. Louis BattleHawks' roster in November 2019. While with the BattleHawks, he set the XFL record for longest made field goal, with a 58-yard field goal. While with the BattleHawks, he started a GoFundMe page for front-line workers during the COVID-19 pandemic, a group which his fiancée was a part of. He was named to the 2020 midseason All-XFL team. He had his contract terminated when the league suspended operations on April 10, 2020.

=== Denver Broncos ===
Russolino was signed to the Denver Broncos practice squad on December 7, 2020. He was signed after former punter and XFL broadcaster Pat McAfee recommended him to Broncos special teams coordinator Tom McMahon. Russolino was elevated to the active roster on December 18 for the team's week 15 game against the Buffalo Bills to replace Brandon McManus, who was in COVID-19 protocols, and reverted to the practice squad after the game. Russolino's practice squad contract with the team expired after the season on January 11, 2021.

=== Arlington Renegades ===
On November 17, 2022, Russolino was drafted by the Arlington Renegades of the XFL. During the 2023 season with the Arlington Renegades of the XFL, Russolino converted 16 of 19 field goal attempts in the regular season, including a long of 56 yards. In the postseason, he converted all five of his field goal attempts, including a successful kick from over 50 yards, helping the Renegades win the 2023 XFL Championship. Russolino went 3-3 on field goal attempts in the XFL Championship game.

He re-signed with the team on January 26, 2024.

In 2024, during the inaugural season of the United Football League (UFL), Russolino scored the first points in league history with a 38-yard field goal in the opening game of the season.

He was released on April 22, 2024.

== Career statistics ==
=== XFL / UFL ===
Season	Team	League	Games	Field Goals	Attempts	Percentage	Long
2020	St. Louis Battlehawks	XFL	5	9	10	90.0%	58
2023	Arlington Renegades	XFL	10	16	19	84.2%	56
2023 (Postseason)	Arlington Renegades	XFL	2	5	5	100%	51
2024	Arlington Renegades	UFL	3	5	6	83.3%	52
