= Austin Walter =

American football player (born 1996)

Profile
- Position: Running back

Personal information
- Born: August 17, 1996 (age 30); Crosby, Texas, U.S.
- Listed height: 5 ft 8 in (1.73 m)
- Listed weight: 202 lb (92 kg)

Career information
- High school: Crosby
- College: Rice
- NFL draft: 2019: undrafted

Career history
- San Francisco 49ers (2019)*; New York Giants (2019); Dallas Renegades (2020); San Francisco 49ers (2020); New York Jets (2021); Las Vegas Raiders (2022–2023)
- * Offseason or practice squad member only

Awards and highlights
- Mid Season All-XFL (2020)

Career NFL statistics as of 2023
- Rushing attempts: 27
- Rushing yards: 104
- Rushing touchdowns: 1
- Receptions: 3
- Receiving yards: 36
- Stats at Pro Football Reference

Austin Rashad Walter (born August 17, 1996) is an American professional football running back. He played college football for the Rice Owls.

== College career ==
Walter played college football at Rice, where he rushed for 1,744 yards and 13 touchdowns, averaging 5.1 yards per carry; he also had 79 receptions for 803 yards, and in his senior season, averaged 27.3 yards on 18 kickoff returns.

== Professional career ==
=== San Francisco 49ers (first stint) ===
Walter went undrafted in the 2019 NFL draft. He signed with the San Francisco 49ers on May 4, 2019, after a tryout with the team. He was waived by the 49ers on August 31, 2019.

=== New York Giants ===
On September 18, 2019, Walter was signed to the practice squad of the New York Giants. Following injuries to starting running back Saquon Barkley and backup Wayne Gallman, Walter was promoted to the 53-man roster on October 10, 2019, but then waived the next day.

=== Dallas Renegades ===
On November 22, 2019, Walter was drafted by the Dallas Renegades in the 2020 XFL Supplemental Draft. He had his contract terminated when the league suspended operations on April 10, 2020. He returned a 97-yard kickoff for a touchdown, the longest in XFL franchise history.

=== San Francisco 49ers (second stint) ===
On September 23, 2020, Walter was signed to the 49ers' practice squad. He was elevated to the active roster on November 5 for the team's week 9 game against the Green Bay Packers, and reverted to the practice squad after the game. He was promoted to the active roster on November 11, 2020. He was placed on the reserve/COVID-19 list by the team on December 17, 2020, and activated on December 28. On February 8, 2021, the 49ers signed him to a one-year contract extension. He was waived on May 12, 2021.

=== New York Jets ===
Walter was claimed off waivers by the New York Jets on May 13, 2021. He was waived/injured on August 17, 2021, and placed on injured reserve. He was released on August 26. Walter was re-signed to the practice squad on October 5, 2021. Walter played his first game for the Jets against the Houston Texans on November 28, 2021, and rushed for 38 yards on 9 carries, including his first NFL touchdown. On December 4, 2021, Walter was elevated from the practice squad for the game against the Philadelphia Eagles. On December 7, 2021, Walter was promoted to the active roster. He was waived on May 6, 2022.

=== Las Vegas Raiders ===
On July 29, 2022, Walter signed with the Las Vegas Raiders. A few days later, in the 2022 Pro Football Hall of Fame game, Walter scored a touchdown against the Jacksonville Jaguars. On August 30, 2022, Walter was waived by the Raiders and then signed to the practice squad the next day. He signed a reserve/future contract on January 9, 2023. He was placed on injured reserve on August 3, 2023.
