= G. A. Mangus =

American football coach (born c. 1969)

Current position
- Title: Offensive coordinator
- Team: Brookland-Cayce HS (SC)

Biographical details
- Born: c. 1969 (age 56–57)
- Education: University of Florida (1992)

Playing career
- 1988–1991: Florida
- Position: Quarterback

Coaching career (HC unless noted)
- 1992–1994: Florida (GA)
- 1995–1998: Widener (OC/QB/OL/LB)
- 1999–2000: Ursinus (AHC/OC)
- 2001: Salesianum School (DE) (OC)
- 2002–2005: Delaware Valley
- 2006–2008: Middle Tennessee (OC)
- 2009–2015: South Carolina (OC/QB/TE)
- 2016: South Carolina State (OC)
- 2017–2018: Kutztown (DC/DB)
- 2020: New York Guardians (OC/WR)
- 2022: Heathwood Hall Episcopal (SC) (assistant)
- 2023–2024: Hammond School (SC) (OC)
- 2025–present: Brookland-Cayce HS (SC) (OC)

Head coaching record
- Overall: 35–12
- Tournaments: 4–2 (NCAA D-III playoffs)

Accomplishments and honors

Championships
- 2 MAC (2004–2005)

George Alford Mangus (born c. 1969) is an American college football coach. He is the offensive coordinator for Brookland-Cayce High School, a position he has held since 2025. He was the head football coach for Delaware Valley University from 2002 to 2005. He also coached for Florida, Widener, Ursinus, Salesianum School, Middle Tennessee, South Carolina, South Carolina State, Kutztown, Heathwood Hall Episcopal School, the New York Guardians of the XFL, and Hammond School. He played college football for Florida as a quarterback.

== Head coaching record ==
Year	Team	Overall	Conference	Standing	Bowl/playoffs	D3^{#}
Delaware Valley Aggies (Middle Atlantic Conference) (2002–2005)
2002	Delaware Valley	2–8	1–8	T–10th		
2003	Delaware Valley	9–2	7–2	T–2nd		
2004	Delaware Valley	12–1	9–0	1st	L NCAA Division III Quarterfinal	11
2005	Delaware Valley	12–1	9–0	1st	L NCAA Division III Quarterfinal	6
Delaware Valley:		35–12	26–10			
Total:		35–12				
National championship Conference title Conference division title or championship game berth
