= 2020 XFL season =

Inaugural season of the XFL (2020)

- League: XFL
- Sport: American football
- Duration: Regular season: February 8 – April 12 (planned); February 8 – March 8 (actual)
- Games: Regular season: 10 per team (planned); 5 per team (actual)
- Teams: 8
- TV partner(s): ABC, ESPN, ESPN2, Fox, FS1, FS2
- Best regular season record: Houston Roughnecks (5–0)
- East champions: Not awarded
- East runners-up: Not awarded
- West champions: Not awarded
- West runners-up: Not awarded

2020 XFL Championship
- Venue: TDECU Stadium, Houston, Texas
- Champions: Not awarded
- Runners-up: Not awarded
- Finals MVP: Not awarded

Seasons
- ← 2001 2023 →

The 2020 XFL season was the first season in the reboot of the XFL, and the second in the history of the XFL brand created and owned by professional wrestling magnate Vince McMahon, coming 19 years after the 2001 XFL season.

The season began on February 8, 2020, with the DC Defenders hosting and defeating the Seattle Dragons. The league planned to have a ten-week regular season through April 12, with division championships April 18 and 19, with the XFL Championship scheduled for April 26 in Houston.

In March 2020, amid the COVID-19 pandemic in the United States, the XFL announced that the league would be canceling the rest of the season, ahead of the league's suspension of operations and bankruptcy filing a month later.

== Background ==
In the 2017 ESPN 30 for 30 documentary This Was the XFL, McMahon openly mused about reviving the XFL, noting that changes would need to be made compared to 2001 in order to make it viable and relevant in the modern era. McMahon had purchased the trademarks of the defunct United Football League and an alternative brand, "UrFL" (Your Football League), in early 2017. The following year, the director of the documentary, Charlie Ebersol (son of Dick Ebersol), would go on to help form the Alliance of American Football (AAF) in 2018, hoping to beat the revived XFL in being the first to play (they did by a year). While the league was able to launch in 2019, a year before the XFL's first season, it went bankrupt before its first season finished after it twice lost its major investors. On December 15, 2017, Bleacher Report columnist Brad Shepard reported that McMahon was seriously considering a revival of the XFL, with an expected announcement on January 25, 2018. In a statement to Deadspin, WWE did not confirm or deny the rumors, but did state that McMahon was establishing a new company known as Alpha Entertainment, which would "explore investment opportunities across the sports and entertainment landscapes, including professional football." On December 21, 2017, WWE issued a filing to the Securities and Exchange Commission, stating that McMahon had sold $100 million worth of WWE stock to fund Alpha Entertainment. Alpha Entertainment is headquartered next door to WWE headquarters in Stamford, Connecticut.

On January 25, 2018, Alpha Entertainment announced a new incarnation of the XFL, which would begin with a 10-week inaugural season beginning in January or February 2020. In a press conference, McMahon stated that the new XFL would be dissimilar to its previous incarnation, stating that "There's only so many things that have 'FL' on the end of them and those are already taken. But we aren't going to have much of what the original XFL had." McMahon stated that the league would feature eight teams as a single entity owned by Alpha (the previous XFL was also a single-entity league), which had been revealed in 2019. Alpha Entertainment was established in order to keep the league's management and operations separate from that of WWE. McMahon is prepared to invest as much as $500 million, five times as much as his investment in the 2001 XFL. The XFL's decision to nix cheerleaders is in part due to changing attitudes regarding women's participation in entertaining sports fans. He liquidated an additional $270 million in WWE stock (representing a 4% stake in WWE) in March 2019 to provide additional funding for the league.

McMahon stated that he wanted to play in existing NFL markets but did not identify potential cities specifically and did not rule out any specific cities. McMahon also did not rule out playing on artificial turf. The original XFL avoided artificial playing surfaces (as most such surfaces then were more carpet-like); however, the technology has advanced considerably since 2001, with modern artificial turfs mimicking real grass more closely. John Shumway from KDKA-TV in Pittsburgh and local media from Orlando and San Diego both inquired about potential teams in their respective cities, but McMahon (while stating that "I love Pittsburgh") declined to name any cities for teams. McMahon also stated that teams would have new identities compared to recycling old identities from the old league. The league sent solicitations to thirty metropolitan areas as potential locations for a team.

== Teams ==
As with the 2001 XFL, the 2020 XFL operated eight teams, all centrally owned by the league's holding company, Alpha Entertainment LLC, as a single entity. Alpha Entertainment was spun off from WWE to keep the league's finances separate from the publicly traded professional wrestling enterprise, with McMahon the sole proprietor.

The emergence of the Alliance of American Football created issues selecting cities to host XFL teams, as many potential candidates became home to AAF teams (notably Orlando, the next largest city without an NFL team and an acceptable stadium. Orlando was also one of the original XFL's most successful markets and second in attendance for the 2019 AAF season). Not wanting teams to compete against other spring football teams in the same market, the XFL chose different cities than the AAF.

Commissioner Oliver Luck announced the eight host cities and stadiums for the first franchises on December 5, 2018, and also announced the starting date of February 8, 2020, the weekend after Super Bowl LIV, as the league chose to focus on placing teams in large media markets, selecting five of the top seven largest media markets in the U.S.; based on 2017 census bureau estimates, all eight XFL markets have over 2.9 million residents each (the smallest being St. Louis). This was seen as a stark contrast to the other emerging spring football league, the Alliance of American Football, which primarily chose markets without NFL teams, seen as a decision to avoid competing with existing fan bases; three of the AAF's markets (Birmingham, Memphis, and Salt Lake, the first two of which had teams in the first XFL) had populations less than half that of St. Louis's. The only 2020 XFL market which did host an NFL team was St. Louis, which in 2015 saw its NFL team (the Rams) return to Los Angeles.

Two of the original league's metropolitan areas also received teams in the revival: New York and Los Angeles. All eight teams received new brandings on August 21, 2019: the New York Guardians, DC Defenders, Tampa Bay Vipers, St. Louis BattleHawks, Dallas Renegades, Houston Roughnecks, Seattle Dragons, and Los Angeles Wildcats.

Names and logos for the XFL teams were to be revealed in early June but were delayed over two months from that date. The XFL filed trademarks for five potential team names for its Seattle-based franchise in late June, including one for the eventually chosen name Seattle Dragons, but not for any of the other seven teams. The names, logos and colors for all eight teams were revealed on August 21, 2019, in a livestreamed special. The 2020 XFL draft was held on October 15 and 16, 2019. Training camps began in November.

Besides the eight competitive teams, the XFL had operated a centralized practice squad and farm team, which operated as a full team with a coaching staff and a 40-man roster (encompassing offensive and defensive players but no special teams) but did not play any on-the-record games against the other eight teams. The team shared practice facilities with the Dallas Renegades and was internally known as "Team 9". Team 9 replenished itself after Week 5 when the team's members were assigned to rosters when it expanded to 57 players each; but the season ended abruptly.

Club	City/State	Stadium	Surface	Capacity†	Head coach
West Division
Dallas Renegades	Arlington, Texas	Globe Life Park in Arlington	Grass	48,114	Bob Stoops
Houston Roughnecks	Houston, Texas	TDECU Stadium	Turf	40,000	June Jones
LA Wildcats	Carson, California	Dignity Health Sports Park	Grass	27,000	Winston Moss
Seattle Dragons	Seattle, Washington	Lumen Field	Turf	69,000†	Jim Zorn
East Division
DC Defenders	Washington, D.C.	Audi Field	Grass	20,000	Pep Hamilton
New York Guardians	East Rutherford, New Jersey	MetLife Stadium	Turf	82,500†	Kevin Gilbride
St. Louis BattleHawks	St. Louis, Missouri	The Dome at America's Center	Turf	66,965†	Jonathan Hayes
Tampa Bay Vipers	Tampa, Florida	Raymond James Stadium	Grass	65,618†	Marc Trestman
Practice squad
Team 9	Arlington, Texas	Globe Life Park in Arlington	Grass	25,000	Bart Andrus

†Full stadium capacity. The large stadiums with multiple decks only open the lower bowl for XFL games, similar to the former AAF games and MLS matches played in large stadiums. The XFL has a target stadium size of 30,000 seats, so that in the event of playoff games, the upper decks can be opened to increase capacity.

Locations of teams for the 2020 XFL season, green - practice team, Western Division - red, Eastern Division - blue

=== Team 9 ===
Team 9 was a specialized team that acted as a hybrid farm team and practice squad for the league, and was inspired by a similar scheme employed by NFL Europe. It held a maximum of 40 players at a time and was meant to prepare players for call up to one of the XFL's 8 teams to fill roster vacancies due to injuries of other players or if the teams see a player as a "hidden gem". The team shared practice facilities and support staff with the Dallas Renegades but maintained its own coaching staff; its head coach was Bart Andrus, who was assisted by Pete Kuharchek (defense) and Peter Vaas (offense). Team 9 did not include the specialist positions of kicker, punter, or long snapper, who were instead reserved in a separate "player pool."

During the first two weeks of the season, teams were encouraged to use players from Team 9 to fill roster spots, but were not required to do so, as they may prefer to sign a player unaffiliated with the XFL or re-sign a player who participated in their preseason camps but was cut. After Week 2, exclusively using Team 9 players to fill rosters became a requirement, with Team 9 constantly replenishing itself by adding new players from outside the XFL.

On March 10, each team's maximum roster size increased from 52 to 57 players and the majority of Team 9 was dispersed. Team 9 was to reload to approximately 36 players.

== Players and coaches ==
Each XFL team had 52 players regular-season roster, far more than the 38 in the original XFL and comparable to the size of the 53-man NFL rosters; 46 of those 52 were active on any given game day.

XFL did not have the same eligibility requirements for players as the NFL. Currently the NFL requires all players to be at least 3 years removed from high school to be eligible for a team's roster. Almost all prospects then participate in NCAA football for the 3-year waiting period. This eligibility requirement is an agreement between the NCAA and the NFL. The NFL, in exchange for not signing young players who would ordinarily play in the NCAA, is allowed nearly unlimited access to scout and recruit college players. In the league's inaugural season, safety Kenny Robinson, who had run into eligibility issues that led to him being expelled from college, chose to play in the XFL instead of transferring to another college; Robinson was a success in the XFL and was ultimately selected in the 2020 NFL Draft.

The first head coach and general manager, Dallas's Bob Stoops, was announced February 7, 2019, with the coaches for Seattle (Jim Zorn), Washington (Pep Hamilton), and Tampa Bay (Marc Trestman) following later in the month. Kevin Gilbride named New York's head coach/general manager on April 16, while Jonathan Hayes was announced as the head coach and general manager of the St. Louis franchise two days later. Winston Moss was announced as Los Angeles's head coach on May 7. The last of the inaugural head coaches, Houston's June Jones, was hired May 13 and introduced May 20.

=== Draft ===
The 2020 XFL draft was held October 15 and 16, 2019, via conference call. Seventy-one players were allocated to each team in separate position drafts: one marquee quarterback allocated by the league to each team, ten skill positions, ten offensive linemen, ten defensive linemen and/or linebackers, ten defensive backs, and thirty players of any position. Due to the structure of the draft, there was no true first overall selection. A supplemental draft was held in late November.

=== Compensation ===
The XFL used a standard form contract paying $2,725 per week for each player on the active roster, $1,040 of which is guaranteed. A $2,222 victory bonus is paid to the players on each game's winning team; this feature is a carryover from the original XFL. The contracts expire at the end of the season, freeing players to sign with any other league. Players are also paid $1,040 per week during the preseason and through the playoffs if their team does not qualify. Starting quarterbacks make an annual salary of up to $495,000, with the average XFL quarterback earning $125,000. In contrast to the original XFL, players' health insurance is covered by the league.

Plans were for the league to offer contracts between one and three years in length. Signing for a longer term would make the player eligible for a loyalty bonus above and beyond their tiered salary; in return, the player would not be allowed to play in any other league during the spring, summer, or autumn months, nor is the contract guaranteed. The overall salary cap will be approximately $4,000,000 per team. The XFL chose a more flexible salary structure so as not to overpay for the lower ends of the roster and to be more competitive for better starting quarterbacks.

Head coaches were eligible for up to a $500,000 salary, with each team having a football operations staff of 25 people.

=== Player movement ===
Transactions

On March 10, each team's maximum roster size increased from 52 to 57 players and the majority of Team 9 was dispersed. Team 9 was to reload to approximately 36 players.

=== Notable players ===
- Connor Cook
- Lance Dunbar
- Michael Dunn
- Kony Ealy
- DeMarquis Gates
- S.J. Green
- Taylor Heinicke
- Will Hill III
- Godwin Igwebuike
- Tyree Jackson
- Josh Johnson
- Steven Johnson
- Cardale Jones
- Landry Jones
- Matt Jones
- Marquette King
- Christian Kuntz
- Matt McGloin
- Christine Michael
- Nick Moore
- Rahim Moore
- Aaron Murray
- Storm Norton
- Nick Novak
- Shawn Oakman
- Donald Parham
- Cam Phillips
- Eli Rogers
- Jordan Ta'amu
- P. J. Walker

== Season structure ==
=== Preseason ===
Minicamps were held at each team's discretion in December 2019. The Wildcats hosted their minicamp at the University of Nevada, Las Vegas while the Renegades hosted theirs at Arlington High School. The Vipers hosted their minicamp at the renovated Plant City Stadium, which also served as the team's headquarters and practice venue during the season.

The XFL held its training camps in Houston, Texas, from January 4–22, 2020. Each team trained at a different stadium in the city, with the hometown Houston Roughnecks using their game stadium, TDECU Stadium. The other seven were as follows:

- Dallas Renegades: Darrell Tully Stadium
- DC Defenders: Rice Stadium
- LA Wildcats: Alexander Durley Sports Complex
- New York Guardians: Husky Stadium
- St. Louis BattleHawks: W.W. Thorne Stadium
- Seattle Dragons: Delmar Stadium
- Tampa Bay Vipers: George Turner Stadium

The eight teams held informal scrimmages against each other. The league did not initially plan to host exhibition games, but the television networks requested preseason matchups in order to conduct trial runs for their broadcasts. These were held during the day midweek in late January and were closed to the public.

=== Regular season ===
The league is divided into two divisions, East and West. Each team was given a ten-game schedule with no bye weeks, playing two games against each division rival (one home and one away) and one game against each team in the other division.

==== Cancellation ====
As the COVID-19 pandemic began to escalate in major American cities, there were concerns in regards to the spread of COVID-19. On March 11, the state of Washington imposed social distancing measures prohibiting the gathering of 250 or more persons. The league initially stated that a Seattle Dragons game against Los Angeles would be held behind closed doors as scheduled. McMahon was planning on defying a similar guideline issued by New Jersey and going ahead with a game between the Houston Roughnecks and New York Guardians at MetLife Stadium with a full crowd, as New Jersey governor Phil Murphy had not made those guidelines mandatory at the time and the league was expecting a large attendance. After the National Basketball Association suspended all games after two players tested positive of the virus, further social distancing measures were announced elsewhere and an unnamed Dragons player developed symptoms of the virus (he later tested positive). The next day, the XFL announced it too canceled the remainder of their regular season.

=== Playoffs ===
The playoffs were to feature four teams, two from each division. In contrast to the 2001 XFL (which used a crossover approach in which teams faced the opposite division), the 2020 XFL would feature two division games, with the top two teams in each division facing off against each other to determine who represents the division in the XFL Championship.

On February 13, 2020, the XFL formally announced that the name of the game would be the "XFL Championship" (reviving the alternate title of the first XFL Championship, which was also known as the Million Dollar Game) and would be held at TDECU Stadium in Houston, Texas. The league initially had hoped that the social distancing measures would expire later in the season to allow the championship to be held. Any hope of resuming the season ended on April 10 with the league terminating almost all of its remaining employees and suspending operations.

== Standings ==
2020 XFL standings
East Division
Team	W	L	PCT	TD+/-	TD+	TD-	DIV	PF	PA	DIFF	STK
DC Defenders	3	2	.600	-3	9	12	2–1	82	89	-7	W1
St. Louis BattleHawks	3	2	.600	3	11	8	1–1	97	77	20	L1
New York Guardians	3	2	.600	-1	8	9	1–2	79	85	-6	W2
Tampa Bay Vipers	1	4	.200	-4	11	15	1–1	98	115	-17	L1
West Division
Team	W	L	PCT	TD+/-	TD+	TD-	DIV	PF	PA	DIFF	STK
Houston Roughnecks	5	0	1.000	7	21	14	3–0	158	111	47	W5
Dallas Renegades	2	3	.400	-3	9	12	2–1	90	102	-12	L2
Los Angeles Wildcats	2	3	.400	4	18	14	0–2	129	122	7	W1
Seattle Dragons	1	4	.200	-3	12	15	0–2	87	119	-32	L3
(x)–clinched playoff berth; (y)–clinched conference; (e)–eliminated from playoff contention

== Season schedule ==
=== Regular season ===
Week 1
Date and time	Away team	Result		Home team	Stadium	Attendance	Broadcast	Viewership (millions)	Rating
February 8, 2:00 p.m. ET	Seattle Dragons	19	31	DC Defenders	Audi Field	17,163	ABC	3.30	2.1
February 8, 5:00 p.m. ET	Los Angeles Wildcats	17	37	Houston Roughnecks	TDECU Stadium	17,815	Fox	3.29	2.0
February 9, 2:00 p.m. ET	Tampa Bay Vipers	3	23	New York Guardians	MetLife Stadium	17,634	Fox	3.39	2.1
February 9, 5:00 p.m. ET	St. Louis BattleHawks	15	9	Dallas Renegades	Globe Life Park in Arlington	17,206	ESPN	2.50	1.4

Week 2
Date and time	Away team	Result		Home team	Stadium	Attendance	Broadcast	Viewership (millions)	Rating
February 15, 2:00 p.m. ET	New York Guardians	0	27	DC Defenders	Audi Field	15,031	ABC	2.13	1.5
February 15, 5:00 p.m. ET	Tampa Bay Vipers	9	17	Seattle Dragons	CenturyLink Field	29,172	Fox	2.32	1.3
February 16, 3:00 p.m. ET	Dallas Renegades	25	18	Los Angeles Wildcats	Dignity Health Sports Park	14,979	ABC	2.40	1.5
February 16, 6:00 p.m. ET	St. Louis BattleHawks	24	28	Houston Roughnecks	TDECU Stadium	17,103	FS1	1.36	0.8

Week 3
Date and time	Away team	Result		Home team	Stadium	Attendance	Broadcast	Viewership (millions)	Rating
February 22, 2:00 p.m. ET	Houston Roughnecks	34	27	Tampa Bay Vipers	Raymond James Stadium	18,117	ABC	1.91	1.2
February 22, 5:00 p.m. ET	Dallas Renegades	24	12	Seattle Dragons	CenturyLink Field	22,060	Fox	2.05	1.3
February 23, 3:00 p.m. ET	New York Guardians	9	29	St. Louis BattleHawks	The Dome at America's Center	29,554	ESPN	1.47	0.9
February 23, 6:00 p.m. ET	DC Defenders	9	39	Los Angeles Wildcats	Dignity Health Sports Park	12,221	FS1	1.00	0.5

Week 4
Date and time	Away team	Result		Home team	Stadium	Attendance	Broadcast	Viewership (millions)	Rating
February 29, 2:00 p.m. ET	Los Angeles Wildcats	14	17	New York Guardians	MetLife Stadium	12,116	ABC	1.56	1.0
February 29, 5:00 p.m. ET	Seattle Dragons	16	23	St. Louis BattleHawks	The Dome at America's Center	27,527	Fox	1.80	1.1
March 1, 4:00 p.m. ET	Houston Roughnecks	27	20	Dallas Renegades	Globe Life Park in Arlington	18,332	FS1	1.11	0.6
March 1, 7:00 p.m. ET	DC Defenders	0	25	Tampa Bay Vipers	Raymond James Stadium	12,249	ESPN2	1.03	0.6

Week 5
Date and time	Away team	Result		Home team	Stadium	Attendance	Broadcast	Viewership (millions)	Rating
March 7, 2:00 p.m. ET	Seattle Dragons	23	32	Houston Roughnecks	TDECU Stadium	19,773	ABC	1.55	1.0
March 7, 5:00 p.m. ET	New York Guardians	30	12	Dallas Renegades	Globe Life Park in Arlington	15,950	Fox	1.50	0.9
March 8, 3:00 p.m. ET	St. Louis BattleHawks	6	15	DC Defenders	Audi Field	16,342	FS1	0.83	0.5
March 8, 9:00 p.m. ET	Tampa Bay Vipers	34	41	Los Angeles Wildcats	Dignity Health Sports Park	12,181	ESPN	0.76	0.5

=== Canceled games ===
Week 6
Date and time	Away team	Home team	Stadium	Broadcast
March 14, 2:00 p.m. ET	Houston Roughnecks	New York Guardians	MetLife Stadium	ABC
March 14, 5:00 p.m. ET	St. Louis BattleHawks	Tampa Bay Vipers	Raymond James Stadium	FS2
March 15, 4:00 p.m. ET	Dallas Renegades	DC Defenders	Audi Field	FS1
March 15, 7:00 p.m. ET	Los Angeles Wildcats	Seattle Dragons	CenturyLink Field	ESPN2

Week 7
Date and time	Away team	Home team	Stadium	Broadcast
March 21, 2:00 p.m. ET	Dallas Renegades	Tampa Bay Vipers	Raymond James Stadium	ABC
March 21, 5:00 p.m. ET	Los Angeles Wildcats	St. Louis BattleHawks	The Dome at America's Center	Fox
March 22, 3:00 p.m. ET	New York Guardians	Seattle Dragons	CenturyLink Field	ABC
March 22, 6:00 p.m. ET	DC Defenders	Houston Roughnecks	TDECU Stadium	FS1

Week 8
Date and time	Away team	Home team	Stadium	Broadcast
March 28, 2:00 p.m. ET	Tampa Bay Vipers	DC Defenders	Audi Field	ABC
March 28, 5:00 p.m. ET	St. Louis BattleHawks	New York Guardians	MetLife Stadium	Fox
March 29, 3:00 p.m. ET	Houston Roughnecks	Los Angeles Wildcats	Dignity Health Sports Park	ABC
March 29, 6:00 p.m. ET	Seattle Dragons	Dallas Renegades	Globe Life Park in Arlington	FS1

Week 9
Date and time	Away team	Home team	Stadium	Broadcast
April 2, 8:00 p.m. ET	Dallas Renegades	Houston Roughnecks	TDECU Stadium	Fox
April 4, 2:00 p.m. ET	DC Defenders	New York Guardians	MetLife Stadium	ABC
April 5, 12:00 p.m. ET	Tampa Bay Vipers	St. Louis BattleHawks	The Dome at America's Center	ESPN
April 5, 6:00 p.m. ET	Seattle Dragons	Los Angeles Wildcats	Dignity Health Sports Park	FS1

Week 10
Date and time	Away team	Home team	Stadium	Broadcast
April 9, 8:00 p.m. ET	Los Angeles Wildcats	Dallas Renegades	Globe Life Park in Arlington	Fox
April 11, 2:00 p.m. ET	Houston Roughnecks	Seattle Dragons	CenturyLink Field	ABC
April 12, 3:00 p.m. ET	DC Defenders	St. Louis BattleHawks	The Dome at America's Center	ESPN
April 12, 6:00 p.m. ET	New York Guardians	Tampa Bay Vipers	Raymond James Stadium	FS1

=== Playoffs ===
The playoffs were scheduled to start on April 18 with the East Division semifinal and end with the championship game on April 26. Due to the COVID-19 pandemic however, the XFL couldn’t complete the regular season nor the postseason.

Division Finals
Date and time	Broadcast
April 18, 3:00 p.m. ET	Fox
April 19, 3:00 p.m. ET	ESPN

XFL Championship
Date and time	Stadium	Broadcast
April 26, 3:00 p.m. ET	TDECU Stadium	ESPN

== Attendance ==
Announced attendance figures for each home game. In the weekly columns, dashes (—) indicate away games, while bold font indicates the highest attendance for each week.

Team / Week	1	2	3	4	5	Total	Average
**Dallas Renegades**	17,206	—	—	18,332	15,950	51,488	17,163
**DC Defenders**	17,163	15,031	—	—	16,342	48,536	16,179
**Houston Roughnecks**	**17,815**	17,103	—	—	**19,773**	54,691	18,230
**Los Angeles Wildcats**	—	14,979	12,211	—	12,181	39,371	13,124
**New York Guardians**	17,634	—	—	12,116	—	29,750	14,875
**Seattle Dragons**	—	**29,172**	22,060	—	—	51,232	25,616
**St. Louis Battlehawks**	—	—	**29,554**	**27,527**	—	57,081	28,541
**Tampa Bay Vipers**	—	—	18,117	12,249	—	30,366	15,183
Total	69,818	76,285	81,942	70,224	64,246	334,272	
Average	17,455	19,071	20,486	17,556	16,062		16,714

== Star of the Week ==
The Star of the Week is a weekly award given out by the XFL. The XFL selects eight nominees (one from each team) based on who they feel had the best performance, or the performance that had the most impact, of that week in XFL play and the public votes on their choice. The two winners from Saturday and Sunday's polls go against each other, and once again the public votes for the winner.

Star of the Week
Week	Player	Position	Team	Ref.
Week 1 (Feb. 12)	P. J. Walker (1)	Quarterback	Houston	
Week 2 (Feb. 19)	Cam Phillips (1)	Wide receiver	Houston	
Week 3 (Feb. 26)	Cam Phillips (2)	Wide receiver	Houston	
Week 4 (March 4)	Jordan Ta'amu (1)	Quarterback	St. Louis	
Week 5 (March 11)	Cam Phillips (3)	Wide receiver	Houston	

== Midseason awards ==
The midseason awards are given out by the XFL at the end of Week 5. These awards are given out first by the league selecting four nominees, and the public votes on who should win. The XFL also selected a mid-season All-XFL Team for the best players at each position.

Midseason awards
Award	Player/Coach	Position	Team	Ref.
Coach of the Year	June Jones	—N/a	Houston	

Midseason All-XFL Team
Position	Player	Team
QB	P. J. Walker	Houston
HB	Matt Jones	St. Louis
WR	Cam Phillips	Houston
WR	Dan Williams III	Tampa Bay
WR	Nelson Spruce	Los Angeles
TE	Donald Parham	Dallas
OL	Terry Poole	Houston
OL	Martez Ivey	Tampa Bay
OL	Anthony Coyle	New York
OL	Sebastian Tretola	Houston
OL	Maurquice Shakir	Dallas
DL	Cavon Walker	New York
DL	Will Sutton	Seattle
DL	Devin Taylor	Los Angeles
DL	Anthony Johnson	DC
LB	DeMarquis Gates	Houston
LB	Steven Johnson	Seattle
DB	Tarvarus McFadden	Tampa Bay
DB	Josh Hawkins	Dallas
DB	Deatrick Nichols	Houston
DB	Will Hill	St. Louis
DB	Kenny Robinson	St. Louis
K	Taylor Russolino	St. Louis
P	Hunter Niswander	DC
KR/PR	Austin Walter	Dallas

The Houston Roughnecks had the most number of players on the All-XFL midseason team with 6, with the St. Louis BattleHawks and Dallas Renegades tied for second at four players. The Tampa Bay Vipers had three, and the other four teams with two each.

== Statistical leaders ==
2020 XFL statistical leaders
Category	Player	Team	Stat
Offense
Passing yards	P. J. Walker	HOU	1,338
Rushing yards	De'Veon Smith	TB	365
Receiving yards	Cam Phillips	HOU	455
Touchdowns	Cam Phillips	HOU	9
Defense
Tackles	Steven Johnson	SEA	48
Sacks	Cavon Walker	NY	4.5
Interceptions	Deatrick Nichols	HOU	3
Special teams
Return yards	John Santiago	SEA	440
Field goals made	Austin MacGinnis	DAL	10
Punting average	Marquette King	STL	45.7

== League finances ==
On December 15, 2017, Bleacher Report columnist Brad Shepard reported that McMahon was seriously considering a revival of the XFL, with an expected announcement on January 25, 2018. In a statement to Deadspin, WWE did not confirm or deny the rumors, but did state that McMahon was establishing a new company known as Alpha Entertainment, which would "explore investment opportunities across the sports and entertainment landscapes, including professional football." On December 21, 2017, WWE issued a filing to the Securities and Exchange Commission, stating that McMahon had sold $100 million worth of WWE stock to fund Alpha Entertainment. Alpha Entertainment was headquartered next door to WWE headquarters in Stamford, Connecticut.

On January 25, 2018, Alpha Entertainment announced a new incarnation of the XFL, which would begin with a 10-week inaugural season beginning in January or February 2020. McMahon stated that the league would feature eight teams as a single entity owned by Alpha (the previous XFL was also a single-entity league), which had been revealed in 2019. Alpha Entertainment was established to keep the league's management and operations separate from that of WWE. McMahon is prepared to invest as much as $500 million, five times as much as his investment in the 2001 XFL. He liquidated an additional $270 million in WWE stock (representing a 4% stake in WWE) in March 2019 to provide additional funding for the league.

=== Partnerships ===
The XFL ran test games with community colleges in Mississippi, Your Call Football (YCF) and The Spring League (TSL) during their spring 2019 seasons, to experiment with rule changes. The XFL even had a preliminary discussions with TSL about their league becoming the "Official 'D-League' of the XFL".

=== Gambling ===
In February 2020, the XFL announced that DraftKings would be the official daily fantasy sports provider of the league and an "authorized gaming operator". McMahon has a minority investment in the company.

Luck stated he anticipated mobile sports betting to be legal in many states by the 2020 launch date, much like it is in New Jersey, and hoped to integrate legal sports betting as part of the XFL. Every state hosting an XFL team, except Florida which has an existing law banning sports betting, has either introduced or passed legislation for the legalization of sports betting. "California also has a pending voter referendum that could legalize sports betting." In December 2019, Luck stated he was cooperating with the Las Vegas sportsbooks in providing official information for betting purposes.

The XFL's main broadcast partner has an official partnership with gambling operators, with ESPN partnered with Caesars Entertainment to use its sportsbook information during telecasts (including displaying lines and the over/under directly on the score bug in-game). The league also announced that it is partnering with Genius Sports on an integrity program to "protect the league from illegal activity". The agreement includes monitoring of all pre-game and live betting markets, including alerts and analysis of odds movements.

The XFL also has an in-house gaming app service called PlayXFL where fans can win cash prizes for correctly predicting the exact score of select XFL games each week. Additionally, fans attending an XFL game can opt-in to play a 4-Question Pick'em contest about the game they are attending for the chance to win prizes, including merchandise and tickets, from the applicable home team.

== Broadcasting ==
This was the first year (and the only year of the contract due to no season games in 2021 or 2022) of a three-year agreement with ESPN and Fox Sports to carry all 43 regular season and playoff games.

During the regular season, ABC was scheduled to air ten Saturday games, five of them ended up being televised, and three Sunday games, airing only one of the four Sunday games. ESPN was to air six Sunday games, airing only two of them, and ESPN2 was to air two Sunday games, airing only one of the two. Fox was to air seven Saturday games, five of the seven being televised, one Sunday game, which was televised, and two Thursday games, neither being played. Fox's main cable sports network, FS1, was to air nine Sunday games, with only four being played, and FS2 was to air one Saturday game, which was not played. ESPN and Fox were both scheduled to air one semifinal each, and ESPN was to air the championship game. All three never made the air.

Vegas Stats & Information Network produced supplemental "BetCasts" for iHeartRadio for two games each week, which featured commentary from a sports betting perspective.

=== Viewership ===
In millions of viewers

Broadcaster	1	2	3	4	5	Total	Average
ABC	**3.3**	2.1	1.9	1.6	1.5	12.8	2.1
ABC	—	2.4	—	—	–	12.8	2.1
ESPN	**2.5**	—	1.5	—	0.8	4.8	1.6
ESPN2	—	—	—	**1.0**	—	1.0	1.0
Fox	3.3	2.3	2.1	1.8	1.5	14.3	2.4
Fox	**3.4**	—	—	—	—	14.3	2.4
FS1	—	**1.4**	1.0	1.1	0.8	4.2	1.1
Total	12.5	8.2	6.4	5.5	4.6	37.3	
Average	3.1	2.1	1.6	1.4	1.2		1.9

One decimal place is shown in table but three decimal places are used in all calculations.

=== Audio and radio coverage ===
Station	Owner	Platform	Team affiliation	Notes	Ref.
National
ESPN Xtra	ESPN	SiriusXM	None	Simulcast of television audio feeds	
Fox Sports Radio	Fox Sports	SiriusXM	None	Simulcast of television audio feeds	
BetCast by VSiN	Musburger family	iHeartRadio app, web	None	Gambling-centered audio broadcast	
Local
106.7 WJFK	Entercom	Radio, web, Radio.com app	DC Defenders	Select games over the air, others online-only due to schedule conflicts	
97.5 KFNC	Gow Media	Radio, web	Houston Roughnecks		
PTSMediaSports.com	PTS Media	Web	Houston Roughnecks	Spanish-language broadcast	
710AM KIRO	Bonneville	Radio	Seattle Dragons	Studio programming only, no live games	

== Signees to other professional leagues ==
After the XFL season was cut short on March 12, 2020, players were allowed to sign with National Football League (NFL) or Canadian Football League (CFL) teams beginning on March 22.

=== NFL signings ===
St. Louis BattleHawks safety Kenny Robinson was drafted by the Carolina Panthers in the fifth round of the 2020 NFL draft, as the only NFL Draft-eligible player who played in the XFL in 2020. Also, the following players signed with NFL teams:

NFL signings
Player	Position	XFL team	Date	NFL team	Ref.
Deatrick Nichols	CB	Houston Roughnecks	March 24	New Orleans Saints	
P. J. Walker	QB	Houston Roughnecks	March 25	Carolina Panthers	
Khari Lee	TE	DC Defenders	March 25	Atlanta Falcons	
DeMarquis Gates	LB	Houston Roughnecks	March 26	Minnesota Vikings	
Nick Moore	LS	Tampa Bay Vipers	March 26	Baltimore Ravens	
Dewayne Hendrix	DE	St. Louis BattleHawks	March 30	Pittsburgh Steelers	
Tyree Kinnel	S	DC Defenders	March 30	Pittsburgh Steelers	
Christian Kuntz	LS	Dallas Renegades	March 30	Pittsburgh Steelers	
Edmond Robinson	LB	Houston Roughnecks	March 30	Atlanta Falcons	
Jordan Ta'amu	QB	St. Louis BattleHawks	April 2	Kansas City Chiefs	
Saivion Smith	CB	Houston Roughnecks	April 10	Dallas Cowboys	
Saeed Blacknall	WR	Los Angeles Wildcats	April 13	Pittsburgh Steelers	
Cavon Walker	DT	New York Guardians	April 13	Pittsburgh Steelers	
Dravon Askew-Henry	CB	New York Guardians	April 14	New York Giants	
Austin MacGinnis	K	Dallas Renegades	April 14	Los Angeles Rams	
Storm Norton	OT	Los Angeles Wildcats	April 14	Los Angeles Chargers	
Donald Parham	TE	Dallas Renegades	April 14	Los Angeles Chargers	
Anthony Coyle	OT	New York Guardians	April 16	Pittsburgh Steelers	
John Keenoy	C	Dallas Renegades	April 16	Pittsburgh Steelers	
Arrion Springs	CB	Los Angeles Wildcats	April 16	Pittsburgh Steelers	
Josh Hawkins	CB	Dallas Renegades	April 16	Atlanta Falcons	
Jacques Patrick	RB	Tampa Bay Vipers	April 17	Cincinnati Bengals	
Avery Gennesy	G	Houston Roughnecks	April 17	Tennessee Titans	
Jarron Jones	OT	New York Guardians	April 20	Pittsburgh Steelers	
Kahlil McKenzie	G	Los Angeles Wildcats	April 20	Seattle Seahawks	
Colin Thompson	TE	Tampa Bay Vipers	April 27	Carolina Panthers	
Zac Kerin	G	New York Guardians	April 29	Tennessee Titans	
DaVonte Lambert	DE	St. Louis BattleHawks	April 30	Carolina Panthers	
De'Mornay Pierson-El	WR	St. Louis BattleHawks	April 30	Las Vegas Raiders	
Juwann Bushell-Beatty	G	Houston Roughnecks	May 1	Carolina Panthers	
Andrew Soroh	FS	New York Guardians	June 9	Kansas City Chiefs	
Michael Dunn	G	Seattle Dragons	August 9	Cleveland Browns	
Connor Davis	TE	St. Louis BattleHawks	August 16	New York Jets	
Pace Murphy	OT	Dallas Renegades	August 18	Dallas Cowboys	
Ricky Walker	DT	Tampa Bay Vipers	August 22	Cleveland Browns	
Will Clarke	DE	St. Louis BattleHawks	August 23	Detroit Lions	
Cam Phillips	WR	Houston Roughnecks	August 26	Carolina Panthers	
Jon Toth	C	DC Defenders	August 27	Cleveland Browns	
DeAndre Thompkins	WR	DC Defenders	August 30	Pittsburgh Steelers	
Antonio Callaway	WR	Tampa Bay Vipers	September 7	Miami Dolphins	
Jeff Badet	WR	Dallas Renegades	September 17	Washington Football Team	
Matt McCrane	K	New York Guardians	September 22	Cleveland Browns	
Austin Walter	RB	Dallas Renegades	September 23	San Francisco 49ers	
Willie Beavers	G	Dallas Renegades	September 24	Atlanta Falcons	
Tegray Scales	LB	Dallas Renegades	October 13	Tampa Bay Buccaneers	
Sergio Castillo	K	Houston Roughnecks	October 14	New York Jets	
Walter Palmore	DT	Houston Roughnecks	October 21	Dallas Cowboys	
Hunter Niswander	P	DC Defenders	October 26	Dallas Cowboys	
Elijah Campbell	DB	DC Defenders	November 3	New York Jets	
Giorgio Tavecchio	K	Los Angeles Wildcats	November 10	Tennessee Titans	
Josh Johnson	QB	Los Angeles Wildcats	November 11	San Francisco 49ers	
Taylor Russolino	K	St. Louis BattleHawks	December 7	Denver Broncos	
Gabe Wright	DT	Houston Roughnecks	December 7	Jacksonville Jaguars	
Taylor Heinicke	QB	St. Louis BattleHawks	December 8	Washington Football Team	
Isaiah Williams	G	Tampa Bay Vipers	December 16	San Francisco 49ers	
Austin Rehkow	P	Houston Roughnecks	December 23	Indianapolis Colts	
Jake Lampman	WR	Tampa Bay Vipers	December 23	New Orleans Saints	
Tanner Gentry	WR	New York Guardians	January 4	Buffalo Bills	
Austin Proehl	WR	Seattle Dragons	January 4	San Francisco 49ers	
Tyree Jackson	QB	DC Defenders	January 7	Philadelphia Eagles	
Godwin Igwebuike	S	Seattle Dragons	January 14	Detroit Lions	
Brian Khoury	LS	DC Defenders	March 17	Baltimore Ravens	
Martez Ivey	OT	Tampa Bay Vipers	April 6	Carolina Panthers	
Scott Daly	LS	New York Guardians	May 4	Detroit Lions	
LaDarius Wiley	S	Los Angeles Wildcats	May 13	Seattle Seahawks	
Eric Dungey	QB	Dallas Renegades	May 14	Cincinnati Bengals	

=== CFL signings ===
The following players signed with CFL teams:

CFL signings
Player	Position	XFL team	Date	CFL team	Ref.
Armanti Edwards	WR	Dallas Renegades	April 10	Edmonton Eskimos	
Dontez Byrd	WR	Seattle Dragons	April 13	Hamilton Tiger-Cats	
Joe Powell	SS	St. Louis BattleHawks	April 13	Hamilton Tiger-Cats	
Jalen Saunders	WR	Houston Roughnecks	April 20	Ottawa Redblacks	
Trenton Thompson	DT	Team 9	April 20	Saskatchewan Roughriders	
Sergio Castillo	K	Houston Roughnecks	April 21	BC Lions	
Ranthony Texada	CB	New York Guardians	May 4	Winnipeg Blue Bombers	
A. J. Hendy	SS	New York Guardians	May 4	Saskatchewan Roughriders	
Brandon Wilds	RB	Tampa Bay Vipers	May 7	Calgary Stampeders	
Channing Stribling	CB	Seattle Dragons	May 12	Hamilton Tiger-Cats	
Na'Ty Rodgers	OT	Tampa Bay Vipers	May 13	Ottawa Redblacks	
Terrence Alexander	CB	New York Guardians	May 22	Winnipeg Blue Bombers	
Doran Grant	CB	DC Defenders	May 28	Winnipeg Blue Bombers	
Mekale McKay	WR	New York Guardians	June 11	Winnipeg Blue Bombers	
Alonzo Russell	WR	St. Louis BattleHawks	July 3	Winnipeg Blue Bombers	
Johnathan Alston	CB	Seattle Dragons	December 8	Ottawa Redblacks	
Obum Gwacham	DE	Tampa Bay Vipers	December 9	BC Lions	
James Butler	RB	Houston Roughnecks	December 10	BC Lions	
Jawuan Johnson	LB	New York Guardians	December 14	Ottawa Redblacks	
De'Veon Smith	RB	Tampa Bay Vipers	December 15	BC Lions	
Markus Jones	LB	Team 9	December 17	Saskatchewan Roughriders	
Tyler Roemer	OT	Los Angeles Wildcats	December 17	BC Lions	
Teo Redding	WR	New York Guardians	December 18	Montreal Alouettes	
Jeremy Clark	CB	Seattle Dragons	December 21	Saskatchewan Roughriders	
Sammie Coates	WR	Houston Roughnecks	December 21	Saskatchewan Roughriders	
James Folston Jr.	LB	Dallas Renegades	December 28	Edmonton Football Team	
Dejon Allen	G	St. Louis BattleHawks	December 28	Toronto Argonauts	
Kent Perkins	G	St. Louis BattleHawks	December 29	BC Lions	
Jazz Ferguson	WR	Dallas Renegades	December 30	BC Lions	
Robert Priester	SS	Tampa Bay Vipers	December 30	Edmonton Football Team	
Tre Watson	LB	Dallas Renegades	January 4	Montreal Alouettes	
Derek Dennis	OT	New York Guardians	January 7	Edmonton Football Team	
Demetrious Cox	S	New York Guardians	January 15	Winnipeg Blue Bombers	
Davon Grayson	WR	St. Louis BattleHawks	January 15	Winnipeg Blue Bombers	
D'Juan Hines	LB	New York Guardians	January 18	Ottawa Redblacks	
Jameer Thurman	LB	DC Defenders	January 19	Calgary Stampeders	
Philip Nelson	QB	Dallas Renegades	January 22	Montreal Alouettes	
Eli Rogers	WR	DC Defenders	January 22	Montreal Alouettes	
Nelson Spruce	WR	Los Angeles Wildcats	January 22	Montreal Alouettes	
Trae Elston	S	Houston Roughnecks	January 25	Calgary Stampeders	
Jarrell Owens	DE	New York Guardians	January 25	Calgary Stampeders	
Tavaris Barnes	DE	DC Defenders	January 27	Calgary Stampeders	
Jeremiah Johnson	CB	Houston Roughnecks	January 30	Winnipeg Blue Bombers	
Marwin Evans	S	Dallas Renegades	January 30	Winnipeg Blue Bombers	
Marcelis Branch	S	Tampa Bay Vipers	February 1	Calgary Stampeders	
Kahlil Lewis	WR	Houston Roughnecks	February 2	Hamilton Tiger-Cats	
Khyri Thornton	DT	St. Louis BattleHawks	February 2	Toronto Argonauts	
Treston Decoud	DB	Dallas Renegades	February 3	Toronto Argonauts	
Jermaine Ponder	CB	Seattle Dragons	February 3	Montreal Alouettes	
Ryan Davis	WR	Tampa Bay Vipers	February 5	Ottawa Redblacks	
Taylor Cornelius	QB	Tampa Bay Vipers	February 9	Edmonton Football Team	
Daniel Williams	WR	Tampa Bay Vipers	February 11	Calgary Stampeders	
Reshard Cliett	LB	Dallas Renegades	February 15	Toronto Argonauts	
Matthew Colburn	RB	New York Guardians	February 15	Toronto Argonauts	
Tarvarus McFadden	CB	Tampa Bay Vipers	February 15	Toronto Argonauts	
Shawn Oakman	DE	Los Angeles Wildcats	February 15	Toronto Argonauts	
Anthoula Kelly	CB	Tampa Bay Vipers	February 17	Hamilton Tiger-Cats	
Desmond Lawrence	CB	DC Defenders	February 17	Hamilton Tiger-Cats	
Marko Myers	CB	Seattle Dragons	February 17	Hamilton Tiger-Cats	
Herb Waters	CB	Tampa Bay Vipers	February 17	Hamilton Tiger-Cats	
Kermit Whitfield	WR	Dallas Renegades	February 18	Saskatchewan Roughriders	
Kony Ealy	DE	Houston Roughnecks	February 22	Toronto Argonauts	
Cameron Artis-Payne	RB	Dallas Renegades	February 23	Montreal Alouettes	
Blake Jackson	WR	Houston Roughnecks	February 25	Winnipeg Blue Bombers	
Jalen Tolliver	WR	Tampa Bay Vipers	March 4	Edmonton Football Team	
Stansly Maponga	DE	Seattle Dragons	March 9	Ottawa Redblacks	
Ajene Harris	CB	Houston Roughnecks	March 11	BC Lions	
Andrew Ankrah	DE	St. Louis BattleHawks	March 11	Edmonton Football Team	
Reggie Howard	NT	Los Angeles Wildcats	March 11	Edmonton Football Team	
Nick Holley	WR	Houston Roughnecks	March 12	Calgary Stampeders	
Trey Williams	RB	Seattle Dragons	March 19	Calgary Stampeders	
Wesley Sutton	S	New York Guardians	March 22	Montreal Alouettes	
De'Ondre Wesley	OT	DC Defenders	April 1	Edmonton Football Team	
Casey Sayles	DT	St. Louis BattleHawks	April 5	Winnipeg Blue Bombers	
Prince Charles Iworah	CB	Team 9	April 7	Montreal Alouettes	
Shamarko Thomas	S	DC Defenders	April 19	Ottawa Redblacks	
Carlton Agudosi	WR	St. Louis BattleHawks	April 30	Winnipeg Blue Bombers	
Praise Martin-Oguike	DE	Seattle Dragons	June 4	Ottawa Redblacks	
Cole Boozer	OL	DC Defenders	June 9	Montreal Alouettes	
Rashad Ross	WR	DC Defenders	June 9	Montreal Alouettes	
Jordan Smallwood	WR	Los Angeles Wildcats	June 21	Ottawa Redblacks	
Terry Poole	OT	Houston Roughnecks	June 25	Winnipeg Blue Bombers	
John Yarbrough	C	Tampa Bay Vipers	June 25	Hamilton Tiger-Cats	
Dexter McCoil	LB	St. Louis BattleHawks	June 28	Toronto Argonauts	
Reggie Cole	CB	DC Defenders	June 28	Hamilton Tiger-Cats	
Robert Nelson	CB	St. Louis BattleHawks	June 30	Montreal Alouettes	
Nyles Morgan	LB	Seattle Dragons	July 1	Edmonton Elks	
David Rivers	CB	St. Louis BattleHawks	July 9	Winnipeg Blue Bombers	
Tarean Folston	RB	Tampa Bay Vipers	July 9	Edmonton Elks	
Mike Stevens	CB	Los Angeles Wildcats	July 10	Saskatchewan Roughriders	
