= Ranthony Texada =

American football player (born 1995)

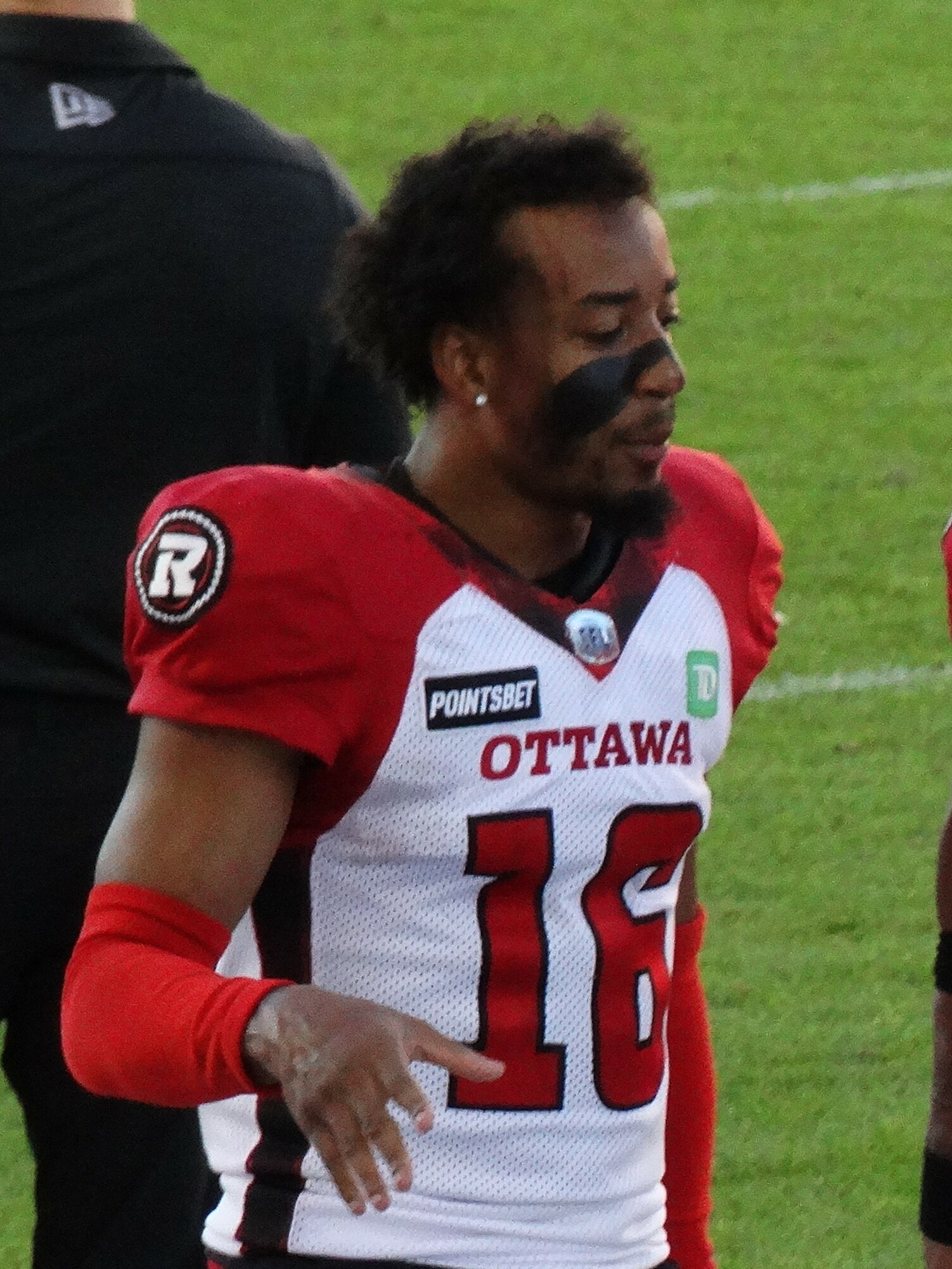
- Texada with the Ottawa Redblacks in 2022

No. 16, 24, 22
- Position: Defensive back

Personal information
- Born: May 16, 1995 (age 31); Frisco, Texas, U.S.
- Listed height: 5 ft 10 in (1.78 m)
- Listed weight: 185 lb (84 kg)

Career information
- High school: Centennial High; Frisco, Texas
- College: TCU
- NFL draft: 2018: undrafted

Career history
- Washington Redskins (2018)*; Ottawa Redblacks (2019)*; New York Guardians (2020); Winnipeg Blue Bombers (2020)*; Ottawa Redblacks (2021–2022); Montreal Alouettes (2022)*; San Antonio Brahmas (2023)
- * Offseason or practice squad member only

Career XFL statistics
- Tackles: 48
- Interceptions: 1

Ranthony Texada II (born May 16, 1995) is an American former professional football defensive back. He was.a member of the Washington Redskins of the National Football League (NFL), New York Guardians and San Antonio Brahmas of the XFL, and Winnipeg Blue Bombers, Ottawa Redblacks, and Montreal Alouettes of the Canadian Football League (CFL).

== College career ==
After using a redshirt season in 2013, Texada played college football for the TCU Horned Frogs from 2014 to 2017. He started in 42 games with the team where he had 117 tackles, 30 pass breakups, three interceptions, and five sacks.

== Professional career ==
=== Washington Redskins ===
After going undrafted in the 2018 NFL draft, Texada signed as an undrafted free agent with the Washington Redskins in 2018, but was released with the final cuts at the conclusion of training camp on September 1, 2018.

=== Ottawa Redblacks (first stint) ===
On November 22, 2018, Texada signed a futures contract with the Ottawa Redblacks for the 2019 season. Following 2019 training camp, he was signed to the team's practice roster on June 8, 2019, but was released one month later on July 8.

=== New York Guardians ===
Texada was drafted in the 10th round, 79th overall, by the New York Guardians in the 2020 XFL draft. He played in five games and recorded 16 tackles and one sack before the league suspended operations and his contract was terminated on April 10, 2020.

=== Winnipeg Blue Bombers ===
On May 4, 2020, Texada signed with the Winnipeg Blue Bombers, but did not play for the team as the Canadian Football League cancelled the 2020 CFL season. He announced that he was opting out of his contract to pursue other playing opportunities on August 25. He opted back into his contract on January 25, 2021. However, Texada was released during training camp on July 26.

=== Ottawa Redblacks (second stint) ===
On August 31, 2021, Texada signed with the Redblacks and was soon after placed on the team's practice roster. He later played in his first CFL game on October 29, against the Calgary Stampeders. He played in three regular season games where he had 11 defensive tackles.

In 2022, Texada began the season on the practice roster, but joined active roster for 7 games following an injury to Abdul Kanneh. He recorded his first career interception in the Labour Day Classic, on September 2, 2022, against the Montreal Alouettes after picking off Trevor Harris. However, he was released shortly after this game on September 7.

=== Montreal Alouettes ===
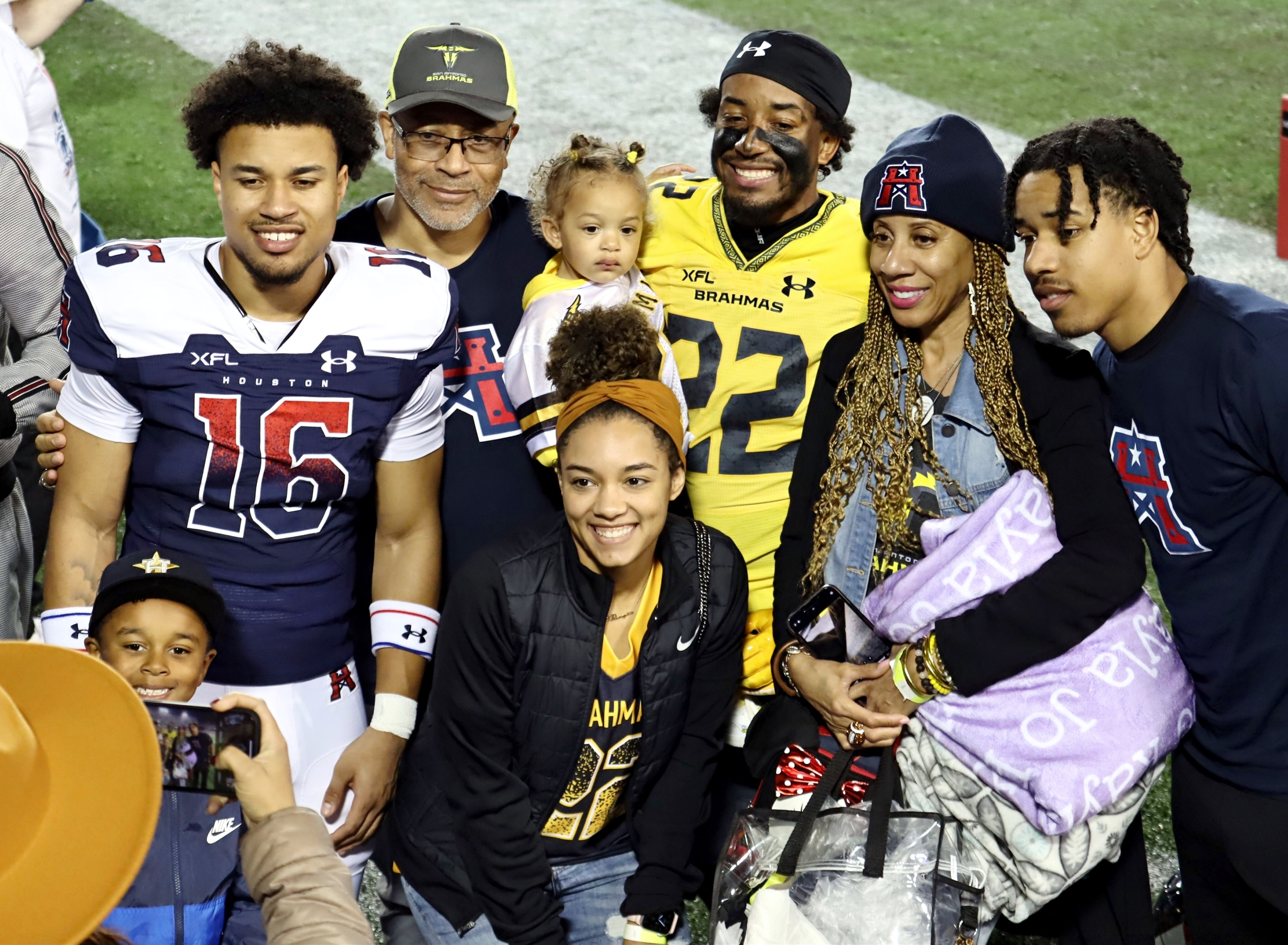
Texada (third from right) with his family, including Houston Roughnecks defensive back Raleigh Texada (far left), following a game for the San Antonio Brahmas in 2023

On September 17, 2022, it was announced that Texada had signed with the Montreal Alouettes practice roster and was released at the end of the season.

=== San Antonio Brahmas ===
The San Antonio Brahmas selected Texada in the 12th round of the 2023 XFL Supplemental Draft on January 1, 2023. He was not part of the roster after the 2024 UFL dispersal draft on January 15, 2024.

== Personal life ==
Texada and his wife, Charli, have one daughter, Rayla. Texada was born to Nerissa and Ranthony Texada Sr. and he has two younger brothers, Raleigh and Ridge, who also play football as defensive backs. Texada played on the same youth baseball team as his future Redblacks teammate, Monshadrik Hunter.
