= Cavon Walker =

American football player (born 1994)

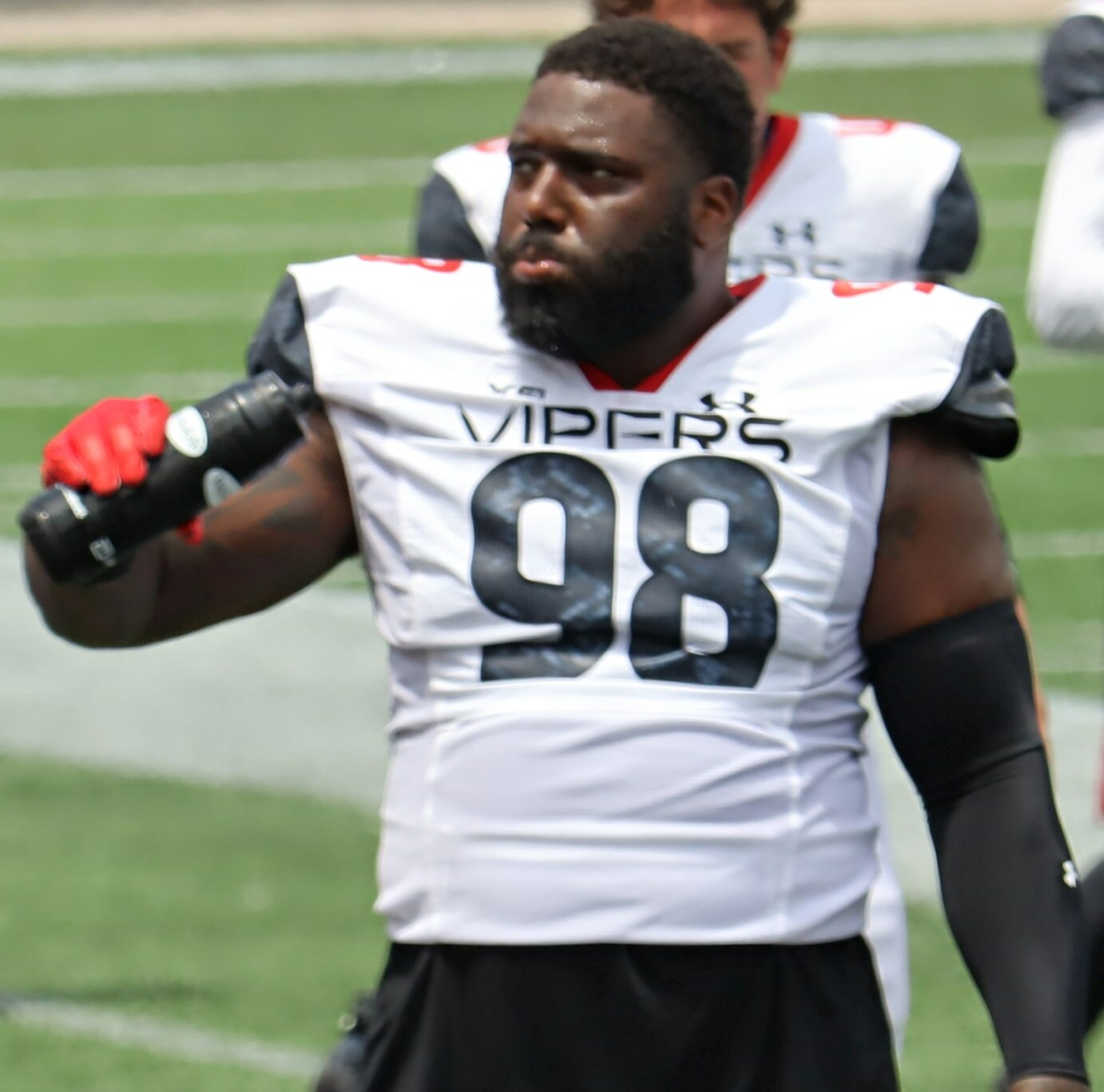
- Walker with the Vegas Vipers in 2023

No. 98
- Position: Defensive end

Personal information
- Born: July 4, 1994 (age 32); Washington, D.C., U.S.
- Listed height: 6 ft 2 in (1.88 m)
- Listed weight: 278 lb (126 kg)

Career information
- High school: Friendship Collegiate Academy Public Charter School
- College: Maryland
- NFL draft: 2018: undrafted

Career history
- Chicago Bears (2018)*; Kansas City Chiefs (2019)*; New York Guardians (2020); Pittsburgh Steelers (2020)*; Michigan Panthers (2022); Vegas Vipers (2023)
- * Offseason or practice squad member only

Awards and highlights
- XFL sacks leader (2020); Mid-season All-XFL (2020)
- Stats at Pro Football Reference

Cavon Walker (born July 4, 1994) is an American former professional football defensive end. He played college football at Maryland.

== Early life ==
Walker was a three-star recruit coming out of high school. Walker committed to play football at Maryland.

== College career ==
Walker played college football at Maryland.

== Professional career ==
=== Chicago Bears ===
On April 28, 2018, Walker was signed by the Chicago Bears as an undrafted free agent. Walker was released during final roster cuts.

=== Kansas City Chiefs ===
Walker was signed to a reserve/future contract with the Kansas City Chiefs following the 2018 NFL season. Walker was waived during final roster cuts.

=== New York Guardians ===
Walker was selected by the New York Guardians in Phase 3 Round 8 of the 2020 XFL draft. Walker led the XFL in sacks. He had his contract terminated when the league suspended operations on April 10, 2020.

=== Pittsburgh Steelers ===
Walker signed with the Pittsburgh Steelers on April 13, 2020. He was waived on September 5, 2020.

=== Michigan Panthers ===
Walker was selected with the first pick of the third round of the 2022 USFL draft by the Michigan Panthers.

=== Vegas Vipers ===
Walker signed with the Vegas Vipers of the XFL on March 16, 2023. The Vipers folded when the XFL and USFL merged to create the United Football League (UFL).
