= Orlando Guardians =

American football team

- Logo
- Uniforms

General information
- Founded: 2018 (as the New York Guardians)
- Folded: 2024
- Colors: Green, lime, grey
- Website: xfl.com/teams/orlando

Personnel
- Owners: Alpha Acquico, LLC: (RedBird Capital Partners; Dwayne Johnson; Dany Garcia)
- Head coach: Kevin Gilbride (2020); Terrell Buckley (2023)

Team history
- New York Guardians (2020–2022); Orlando Guardians (2023)

Home fields
- MetLife Stadium (2020); Camping World Stadium (2023)

League / conference affiliations
- XFL (2020–2023): East Division (2020); South Division (2023)

The Orlando Guardians were a professional American football team based in Orlando, Florida. The Guardians competed in the XFL. The team was founded by Vince McMahon's Alpha Entertainment as the New York Guardians and were owned-and-operated by Dwayne Johnson’s Alpha Acquico. The Guardians played their home games at MetLife Stadium in 2020 and at Camping World Stadium in 2023. The Guardians had a franchise regular season record of 4–11 (.267), the second worst win percentage among all XFL teams.

== History ==
=== New York Guardians (2020, McMahon era) ===
New York, joined Seattle, Houston, LA, St. Louis, DC, Tampa Bay, and Dallas as the XFL's inaugural cities. On April 15, 2019, the team hired Kevin Gilbride, who most recently was the Offensive Coordinator for the New York Giants as their first head coach. The team name and logo were revealed on August 21, 2019, as well as the teams uniforms on December 3, 2019.

On October 15, 2019, The Guardians announced their first player in team history, being assigned former Oakland Raiders Quarterback Matt McGloin.

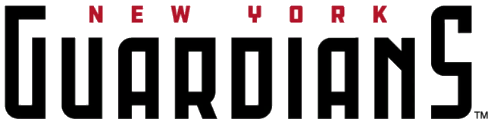
Former Guardians Wordmark logo (2020)

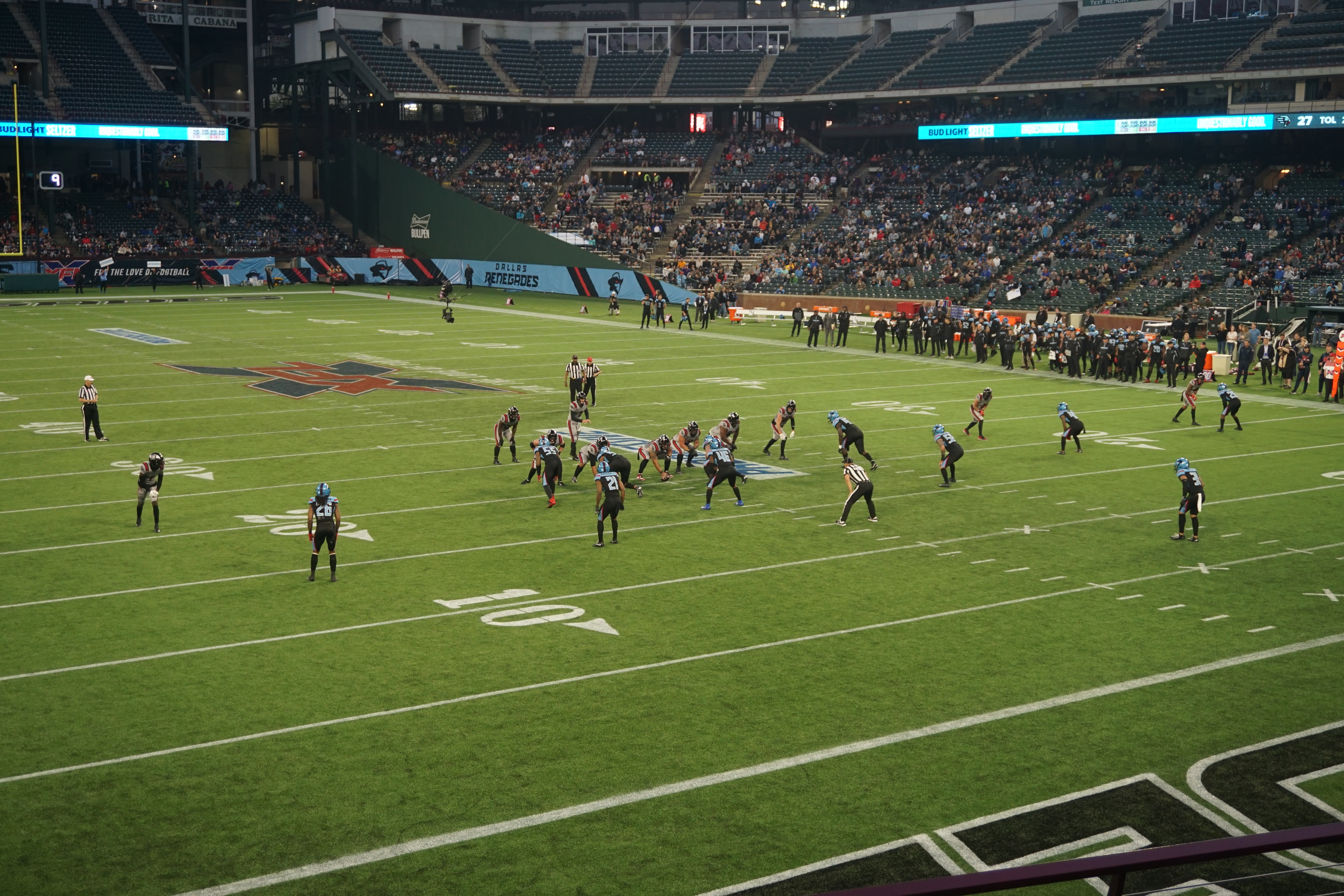
New York in action against Dallas in 2020

The Guardians won the first game in franchise history, topping the Tampa Bay Vipers 23–3 at MetLife Stadium. Quarterback Matt McGloin scored the first touchdown in team history on their first possession, a one-yard score that put them up 6–0. McGloin would later find Colby Pearson for a passing touchdown. Defensively, the Guardians forced three turnovers, including a fumble return for a touchdown by Jamar Summers. Tampa Bay reached the red zone five times, but emerged only with a field goal due to a standout defensive effort. The Guardians' first road game saw them become the victims of the first shutout in the new XFL's history, as they fell to the DC Defenders by a score of 27–0 at Audi Field. The game became notable for a McGloin sideline interview with ABC/ESPN's Dianna Russini, in which he was very critical of the team's offensive gameplan. McGloin was eventually pulled from the game for backup Marquise Williams in the second half. On March 12, 2020, the XFL announced that the remainder of the 2020 XFL season had been cancelled due to the COVID-19 pandemic. The team finished with a 3–2 record. On April 10, 2020, The XFL suspended operations, and all employees, players and staff would be terminated.

=== Orlando Guardians (2023, Dwayne Johnson and Dany Garcia era) ===
As early as April 2020, the XFL was reported to have been relocating a team to Orlando. Orlando had not yet been available at the time the league chose its inaugural eight teams because of the Alliance of American Football placing the Orlando Apollos there, but it was one of the largest markets without an NFL team and had hosted the Orlando Rage, a highly successful team in the original XFL of 2001. The earliest reports said the league was planning to move the Tampa Bay Vipers to Orlando, as the Vipers had only mild support (amid a league-worst 1–4 record) in Tampa, and its practice facility in Plant City was located on Interstate 4 halfway between the two cities, which are 80 miles (130 km) apart. The same reports indicated that the league had hoped to stay in the New York metropolitan area, with the main obstacle being a stadium (MetLife Stadium was one of the largest stadiums in the XFL and had a very poor average attendance). Discussions had begun about potentially moving to the more appropriately sized Red Bull Arena. When team locations were revealed on July 25, 2022, the league (now under ownership of the Dany Garcia-Dwayne Johnson consortium) confirmed that Orlando would receive a team in 2023 and Tampa Bay would no longer have one. In the same announcement, the league also confirmed that there would be no team in the New York area. However, when team brands were leaked in September and confirmed a month later, it was instead revealed that the Vipers brand would be relocated to Las Vegas, Nevada and Orlando would receive the branding of the former New York Guardians.

Terrell Buckley was reported as the Orlando team's head coach on April 6, 2022; the league confirmed this on July 25.

Orlando Guardians finished the season 1–9, only winning against the DC Defenders

In September 2023, Axios reported that the XFL was in advanced talks with the USFL to merge the two leagues prior to the start of their 2024 seasons. On September 28, 2023, the XFL and USFL announced their intent to merge with details surrounding the merger to be announced at a later date. The merger would also require regulatory approval. In October 2023, the XFL filed a trademark application for the name "United Football League". On November 30, 2023, Garcia announced via her Instagram page that the leagues had received regulatory approval for the merger and were finalizing plans for a "combined season" to begin March 30, 2024. The merger was made official on December 31, 2023, and it was announced the Guardians would not be part of the merger.

The UFL announced its return to Orlando on October 7, 2025, with the team slated to play at Inter.co Stadium. The UFL had retained a stadium lease with Camping World Stadium for the league's eventual return, but opted not to exercise it after incoming investor Mike Repole began mandating smaller stadiums for all of the UFL's teams. This team did not revive the Guardians name and instead adopted a new brand, the Orlando Storm.

== Player history ==
=== Current NFL players ===
XFL season	Pos	Name	NFL team
2020	LS	Scott Daly	Green Bay Packers

=== Notable players ===
XFL season	Pos	Name	Notes
2020	QB	Matt McGloin	Former Oakland Raiders Quarterback
2023	QB	Paxton Lynch	Former Denver Broncos Quarterback, 2016 1st Round Pick
2023	WR	Eli Rogers	Former Pittsburgh Steelers Wide Receiver
2023	WR	Cody Latimer	Former Denver Broncos Wide Receiver, 2014 2nd Round Pick
2023	S	Matt Elam	Former Baltimore Ravens Safety, 2013 1st Round Pick

== Coach history ==
=== Head coach history ===
#	Name	Term	Regular season				Playoffs			Awards
#	Name	Term	GC	W	L	Win %	GC	W	L	Awards
New York Guardians
1	Kevin Gilbride	2020	5	3	2	.600	–	–	–	
Orlando Guardians
2	Terrell Buckley	2023	10	1	9	.100	–	–	–	

=== Offensive coordinator history ===
#	Name	Term	Regular season				Playoffs			Awards
#	Name	Term	GC	W	L	Win %	GC	W	L	Awards
New York Guardians
1	G. A. Mangus	2020	5	3	2	.600	–	–	–	
Orlando Guardians
2	Robert Ford	2023	10	1	9	.100	–	–	–	

=== Defensive coordinator history ===
#	Name	Term	Regular season				Playoffs			Awards
#	Name	Term	GC	W	L	Win %	GC	W	L	Awards
New York Guardians
1	Jim Herrmann	2020	5	3	2	.600	–	–	–	
Orlando Guardians
2	Tony Carter	2023	10	1	9	.100	–	–	–	

== Rivalries ==
=== Overall regular season record vs. opponents ===
Team	Record	Win %
Los Angeles Wildcats	1–0	1.000
DC Defenders	1–1	.500
Vegas Vipers	1–1	.500
Arlington Renegades	1–2	.333
Seattle Sea Dragons	0–1	.000
Houston Roughnecks	0–2	.000
San Antonio Brahmas	0–2	.000
St. Louis Battlehawks	0–2	.000

=== Season-by-season record ===
XFL champions^{§}	Division champions^{^}	Wild Card berth^{#}

Season	Team	League	Conference	Division	Regular season			Postseason results	Awards	Head coaches	Pct.
Season	Team	League	Conference	Division	Finish	W	L	Postseason results	Awards	Head coaches	Pct.
2020	2020	XFL		East	3rd	3	2	Season suspended after 5 games due to COVID-19		Kevin Gilbride	.600
2021	No Season										
2022	No Season										
2023	2023	XFL		South	4th	1	9			Terrell Buckley	.100
Total						4	11	All-time regular season record (2020–2023)			.267
Total						0	0	All-time postseason record (2020–2023)			–
Total						4	11	All-time regular season and postseason record (2020–2023)			.267

== Records ==
All-time Guardians leaders
Leader	Player	Record	Years with Guardians
Passing yards	Quinten Dormady	1,507 passing yards	2023
Passing Touchdowns	Quinten Dormady	10 passing touchdowns	2023
Rushing yards	Devin Darrington	294 rushing yards	2023
Rushing Touchdowns	Quinten Dormady Devin Darrington	4 rushing touchdowns	2023 2023
Receiving yards	Cody Latimer	593 receiving yards	2023
Receiving Touchdowns	Cody Latimer	4 receiving touchdowns	2023
Receptions	Cody Latimer	50 receptions	2023
Tackles	Terrance Plummer	56 tackles	2023
Sacks	Cavon Walker	4.5 sacks	2020
Coaching wins	Kevin Gilbride	3 wins	2020

== Market overview ==
The Guardians were the first professional outdoor football team in Orlando since the Orlando Apollos of the Alliance of American Football in 2019, where they averaged over 19,000 fans per game. The Guardians joined the Orlando Magic, Orlando Solar Bears, Orlando City SC, and the Orlando Pride as professional sports teams based in Orlando. The Guardians also joined the Orlando Predators as professional football teams located in Orlando.
