= Dimel =

Dimel is a surname. Notable people with the surname include:

- Dana Dimel (1962–2024), American football player and coach
- Winston Dimel (born 1995), American football player
