= Jack Tocho =

American football player (born 1995)

No. 29, 39
- Position: Safety

Personal information
- Born: November 2, 1995 (age 31); Gastonia, North Carolina, U.S.
- Listed height: 6 ft 0 in (1.83 m)
- Listed weight: 202 lb (92 kg)

Career information
- High school: Independence (Charlotte, North Carolina)
- College: NC State
- NFL draft: 2017: 7th round, 245th overall pick

Career history
- Minnesota Vikings (2017–2018)*; Washington Redskins (2018)*; Birmingham Iron (2019); Pittsburgh Steelers (2019)*; Los Angeles Wildcats (2020); Philadelphia Stars (2022)*
- * Offseason or practice squad member only
- Stats at Pro Football Reference

Jack Zephania Tocho (born November 2, 1995) is an American former professional football safety. He played college football at North Carolina State University, and was selected by the Minnesota Vikings in the seventh round of the 2017 NFL draft.

== Early life ==
Born in Gastonia, North Carolina, Tocho started playing football at the age of eight. He attended Independence High School, where he played cornerback, running back and safety for coach Bill Geiler. Tocho started at linebacker on varsity during his sophomore season because of a void at the position. In 2011, Tocho was moved back to cornerback for his junior year where he earned All-Southwestern Conference honors after ending the campaign with five interceptions, 28 pass breakups, 48 tackles, a forced fumble, a blocked kick, and two touchdowns on kickoff returns.

During the summer, Tocho was timed at 4.49 in the 40-yard dash and recorded a 35.5-inch vertical jump at the Under Armour Combine, after checking in at 6'0" and 175 pounds. As a senior, he was named Independence's 2012 Scholar Athlete of the Year and was named to the Associated Press All-State team after helping lead his team to a 10–3 record and second round of the state playoffs. He totalled 57 tackles (49 of them solo), six interceptions and returned three kicks for touchdowns in his final season. Tocho also participated in track and field for the Patriots.

Despite his combined numbers and on-field accomplishments, Tocho was an under the radar prospect and only NC State and Virginia expressed interest in him. After taking a visit to NC State, he committed to play college football for the Wolfpack on January 18, 2013.

== Professional career ==
=== Pre-draft ===
Tocho ran a 4.54-second 40-yard dash at the 2017 NFL Combine.

External videos
- Tocho performing at the NFL Combine
- Tocho gets drafted by Minnesota

Pre-draft measurables
Height	Weight	Arm length	Hand span	40-yard dash	10-yard split	20-yard split	20-yard shuttle	Three-cone drill	Vertical jump	Broad jump	Bench press
6 ft 0 1/4 in (1.84 m)	202 lb (92 kg)	31 5/8 in (0.80 m)	9 3/8 in (0.24 m)	4.52 s	1.56 s	2.62 s	4.34 s	7.11 s	35 in (0.89 m)	10 ft 5 in (3.18 m)	21 reps
All values are from NFL Combine except 40-yard dash and agility drills

=== Minnesota Vikings ===
Tocho was selected in the seventh round (245th overall) by the Minnesota Vikings in the 2017 NFL draft. Tocho is the fifth player in Vikings history to be drafted from North Carolina State, joining running back Ted Brown, cornerback Dewayne Washington, safety Brian Williams and linebacker Audie Cole. Tocho was the only player in the defensive back position group taken by the Vikings in the 2017 draft. On September 2, 2017, Tocho was waived by the Vikings. He was signed to their practice squad on September 20, 2017. He was released on November 1, 2017, and was re-signed on November 14. He was released again on December 12, 2017, but was re-signed three days later. He signed a reserve/future contract with the Vikings on January 29, 2018.

On September 1, 2018, Tocho was waived by the Vikings and was signed to the practice squad the next day. He was released on September 19, 2018.

=== Washington Redskins ===
On December 19, 2018, Tocho was signed to the Washington Redskins practice squad.

=== Birmingham Iron ===
In 2019, Tocho joined the Birmingham Iron of the Alliance of American Football (AAF).

=== Pittsburgh Steelers ===
Tocho was signed by the Pittsburgh Steelers on April 5, 2019, three days after the AAF suspended football operations. He was released on May 9, 2019.

=== Los Angeles Wildcats ===
In October 2019, Tocho was selected by the Los Angeles Wildcats of the XFL in the 2020 XFL draft. He had his contract terminated when the league suspended operations on April 10, 2020.

== Personal life ==
Tocho's parents, David and Gertrude, immigrated to the United States from Kenya in pursuit of a better life. His middle name, Zephania, comes from his paternal grandfather. Tocho was a two-time Academic All-ACC performer, qualifying for the honor by maintaining a 3.0 cumulative grade point average during his undergraduate academic career. He earned his undergraduate degree in finance with a minor in accounting in just three years.
