= Chad Kanoff =

American football player (born 1994)

No. 6, 2, 3
- Position: Quarterback

Personal information
- Born: October 6, 1994 (age 32); Pacific Palisades, California, U.S.
- Listed height: 6 ft 4 in (1.93 m)
- Listed weight: 225 lb (102 kg)

Career information
- High school: Harvard-Westlake School (Los Angeles, California)
- College: Princeton
- NFL draft: 2018: undrafted

Career history
- Arizona Cardinals (2018); Detroit Lions (2019)*; Tampa Bay Buccaneers (2019)*; New York Guardians (2020)*; Los Angeles Wildcats (2020)
- * Offseason or practice squad member only

Awards and highlights
- Bushnell Cup (2017); First-team All-Ivy League (2017); Second-team All-Ivy League (2016)

Charles "Chad" Kanoff (born October 6, 1994) is an American former professional football player who was a quarterback in the National Football League (NFL). He played college football for the Princeton Tigers. He signed as an undrafted free agent with the Arizona Cardinals in 2018.

== College career ==
After missing the 2014 season due to a shoulder injury, Kanoff started his first game in a spring exhibition in Japan vs the Kwansei Gakuin Fighters in 2015 where the Tigers won 36-7. Kanoff was named the Legacy Bowl MVP. In the 2015 season he started all 10 games, and became the first Princeton quarterback since Chad Roghair (1991) to win his first four collegiate starts. In the 2016 season, Kanoff earned second-team All-Ivy League honors as the starting quarterback and tri-captain after leading Princeton to the Ivy League championship. In the 2017 season, Kanoff became Princeton's 11th Bushnell Cup winner as the Ivy League Offensive Player of the Year after a record-breaking season. He broke the Ivy League record for single-season passing yards with 3,474, and single-season completion percentage with 73.2% (previous mark was 70.4%), and was 2nd all-time for touchdowns in a season with 29. Handed Harvard its worst home Ivy loss in 50 years (52-17) by going 31 for 35 for 421 yards and two touchdowns. Kanoff also broke the Princeton career record for passing yards with 7,510.

== Professional career ==
=== Arizona Cardinals ===
After going undrafted in the 2018 NFL draft, Kanoff signed as an undrafted free agent with the Arizona Cardinals on May 1, 2018. He was waived on September 1, 2018 and was signed to the practice squad the next day. He was promoted to the active roster on November 24, 2018. He was waived on November 29, 2018 and re-signed to the practice squad. He signed a reserve/future contract with the Cardinals on December 31, 2018.

On August 31, 2019, Kanoff was waived by the Cardinals during final roster cuts.

=== Detroit Lions ===
On September 4, 2019, Kanoff was signed to the Detroit Lions practice squad. He was released on September 11.

=== Tampa Bay Buccaneers ===
On October 9, 2019, Kanoff was signed to the Tampa Bay Buccaneers practice squad. His practice squad contract with the team expired on January 6, 2020.

=== New York Guardians ===
Kanoff signed with the New York Guardians of the XFL on January 5, 2020.

=== Los Angeles Wildcats ===
Kanoff was traded to the Los Angeles Wildcats in exchange for Luis Perez on January 19, 2020. Kanoff scored the first touchdown in Los Angeles Wildcats (XFL) franchise history with a scramble left for a five yard score.
He had his contract terminated when the league suspended operations on April 10, 2020.

=== Career statistics ===
Year	Team	Games		Passing								Rushing			
Year	Team	GP	GS	Cmp	Att	Pct	Yds	Avg	TD	Int	Rtg	Att	Yds	Avg	TD
2020	LA	1	1	21	40	53	214	5.4	1	1	66.0	4	21	5.3	1
