= Ty Knott =

American football coach (born 1965)

Personal information
- Born: December 9, 1965 (age 60); Los Angeles, California, U.S.

Career information
- College: Oregon Tech

Career history

Coaching
- Oregon Tech (1988–1989) Defensive backs coach; Whittier College (1994–1995); Indiana University (1997–1999); Mt. San Antonio (2000); Greenville College (2001); Jacksonville Jaguars (2002) Offensive assistant; New Orleans Saints (2003–2005) Defensive quality control coach; Green Bay Packers (2006–2008) Offensive quality control coach; Texas Southern (2011) Special teams coordinator; Minnesota–Crookston (2012) Defensive coordinator; Memphis Express (2019) Special teams coordinator/running backs coach; Los Angeles Wildcats (2020) Assistant head coach/Tight ends; Saint Mary of the Woods College (2021) Head coach-Sprint Football; Bentley University (2022) Offensive coordinator/Quarterback Coach; Seattle Sea Dragons (2023) Wide receivers coach/Special teams coordinator

Operations
- San Francisco 49ers (2009–2010) Director of Player Development

Ty Knott (born December 9, 1965) is an American football who recently served as the wide receivers coach and special teams coordinator for the Seattle Sea Dragons of the XFL.

== Early life ==
Knott was born on December 9, 1965, in Los Angeles, California. He attended the Oregon Institute of Technology where he played as a defensive back.

== Career ==
Knott worked as an assistant at Whittier College, Indiana University, Mt. San Antonio College, and Greenville College, University of Minnesota Crookston, Texas Southern University and, Saint Mary of the Woods College.

In the National Football League, Knott was an offensive assistant for the Jacksonville Jaguars in 2002. A year later, he became the defensive quality control coach for the New Orleans Saints, a position he served from 2003 to 2005. He was hired as the offensive quality control coach of the Green Bay Packers in 2006, but was fired after the 2008 season. In 2009 and 2010, he was the Director of Player Development for the San Francisco 49ers, where he worked with head coach Mike Singletary.

In 2018, Knott reunited with Singletary on the Memphis Express of the Alliance of American Football, where Knott served as running backs coach and special teams coordinator. The following year, he became assistant head coach and tight ends coach for the Los Angeles Wildcats of the XFL.

In November 2021 Knott was announced as the inaugural Head Sprint Football coach at Saint Mary of the Woods College, as of April 2022 Knott is no longer at the university, having never coached a game for the school.

Starting in 2022 Knott served as the offensive coordinator and quarterback coach for the Bentley Falcons football team, an NCAA Division II program.

Knott was officially hired by the Seattle Sea Dragons on September 13, 2022. On January 1, 2024, it was announced the Sea Dragons would not be a part of the UFL Merger.
