= Ahmad Dixon =

American football player (born 1991)

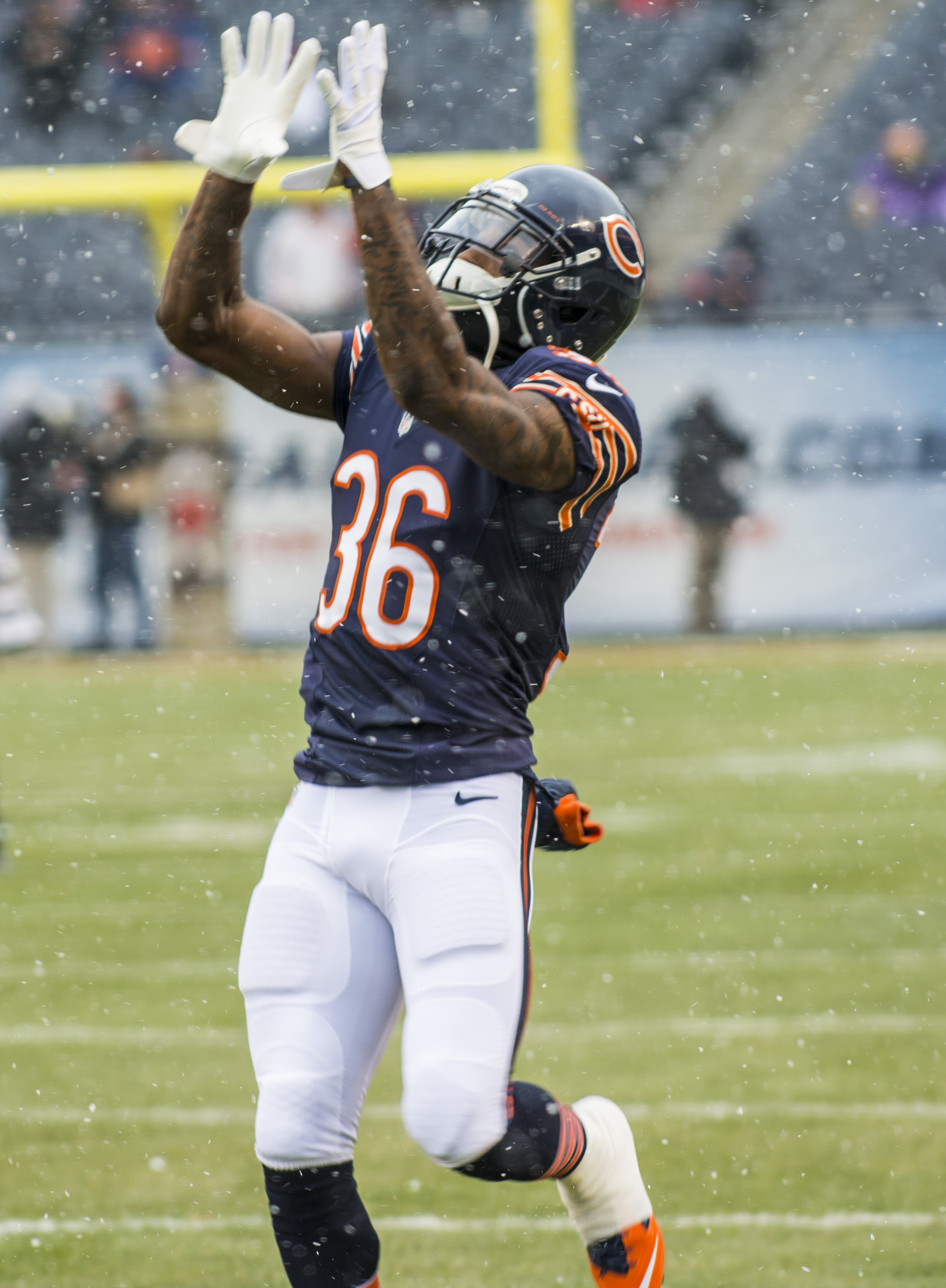
- Dixon playing for the Chicago Bears in 2014

No. 36
- Position: Safety

Personal information
- Born: September 5, 1991 (age 35); Waco, Texas, U.S.
- Listed height: 6 ft 0 in (1.83 m)
- Listed weight: 210 lb (95 kg)

Career information
- High school: Midway (Waco)
- College: Baylor
- NFL draft: 2014: 7th round, 248th overall pick

Career history
- Dallas Cowboys (2014)*; Minnesota Vikings (2014)*; Chicago Bears (2014); Miami Dolphins (2014)*; Minnesota Vikings (2014); Edmonton Eskimos (2017); Edmonton Eskimos (2018)*; Los Angeles Wildcats (2020); Massachusetts Pirates (2021); Philadelphia Stars (2022); Massachusetts Pirates (2023)*
- * Offseason or practice squad member only

Awards and highlights
- Second-team All-American (2013); First-team All-Big 12 (2013)
- Stats at Pro Football Reference

Ahmad D'shaad Dixon (born September 5, 1991) is an American former professional football safety. He played college football for the Baylor Bears and was selected by the Dallas Cowboys in the seventh round of the 2014 NFL draft.

== Early life ==
Dixon attended Midway High School in Waco, Texas, where he registered more than 300 tackles in his prep career. As senior in 2010, he was named first-team All-District 16-4A and 1st Team All-State honors safety, for the third consecutive season after leading Midway High to a 9–3 record. He totaled 114 tackles, 10 tackles for losses, batted down 9 passes, 4 interceptions, and averaged 40 yards per kickoff return, including a long one of 87 yards. He played in the 2010 U.S. Army All-American Bowl in San Antonio, Texas.

He was also a standout track & field athlete, and was part of a Midway 4x400 meter relay squad that advanced to state track meet in 2008 and 2009. Capturing gold as a sophomore in 2008.

Considered a four-star recruit by Rivals.com, he was rated as the 18th best safety prospect in the nation. He accepted a football scholarship from Baylor over offers from Oklahoma State, Tennessee and Texas.

== College career ==
Dixon as a true freshman played in 11 games (missed two with injuries) as a backup safety and on special teams. The next year, he became a starter and switched from safety to the hybrid nickelback position, recording 89 tackles (fourth on team), 3 passes defensed and one interception.

In 2012, he started 13 games, while registering 102 tackles (third on the team), 3 passes defensed, 2 interceptions and one sack. As a senior, he started 12 games (missed one because of a targeting penalty) playing mostly as a safety (one game at nickelback), finishing with 81 tackles (second on the team), 6 passes defensed and one interception. He received second-team All-Big 12 and second-team All-American honors at the end of the season.

== Professional career ==
Pre-draft measurables
| Height | Weight | 40-yard dash | 10-yard split | 20-yard split | 20-yard shuttle | Three-cone drill | Vertical jump | Broad jump | Bench press |
|---|---|---|---|---|---|---|---|---|---|
| 6 ft 0 in (1.83 m) | 212 lb (96 kg) | 4.48 s | 1.59 s | 2.60 s | 4.39 s | 7.28 s | 34 in (0.86 m) | 9 ft 3 in (2.82 m) | 14 reps |
All values from NFL Combine and Pro Day

=== Dallas Cowboys ===
Dixon was selected in the seventh round (248th overall) of the 2014 NFL draft by the Dallas Cowboys. After earning praise from head coach Jason Garrett for his play in the preseason game against the San Diego Chargers where he registered 12 tackles, he was late for the walk-through practice before playing the Baltimore Ravens, which led to the team suspending him for that game.

Even though he made the initial regular season roster, after being late for a team meeting on September first, he was waived the same day to make room for C. J. Spillman.

=== Minnesota Vikings (first stint) ===
The Minnesota Vikings signed him to their practice squad on September 3, 2014.

=== Chicago Bears ===
The Chicago Bears signed him from the Vikings practice squad on September 8, 2014. He was released on November 18, to make room for Marc Mariani, after registering four special teams tackles and a fumble recovery in five games.

=== Miami Dolphins ===
On November 25, 2014, he was signed by the Miami Dolphins to their practice squad. He was cut on December second, to make room for linebacker Jake Knott.

=== Minnesota Vikings (second stint) ===
On December 6, 2014, he was signed to the Vikings practice squad. On December 17, he was promoted to the active roster, filling the spot vacated after offensive tackle J'Marcus Webb was waived. He was released on May 7, 2015.

=== Edmonton Eskimos (first stint) ===
Dixon signed with the Edmonton Eskimos of the Canadian Football League on December 9, 2016. He was released on May 1, 2017, but was re-signed on June 5. He was released again on June 17. On September 12, he was added to the practice roster, and promoted to the active roster on September 15. He appeared in one game before being released on September 21.

=== The Spring League ===
In 2018, he agreed to play in The Spring League, a non-paying developmental league, as part of the South team.

=== Edmonton Eskimos (second stint) ===
On January 25, 2018, Dixon re-signed with the Eskimos. He was released during final roster cuts on June 10.

=== Los Angeles Wildcats ===
Dixon was selected in the 6th round during phase four in the 2020 XFL draft by the Los Angeles Wildcats. In March, amid the COVID-19 pandemic, the league announced that it would be cancelling the rest of the season. Playing in all 5 games, he registered 44 tackles and no interceptions. He had his contract terminated when the league suspended operations on April 10, 2020.

=== Massachusetts Pirates (first stint) ===
Dixon played for the Massachusetts Pirates of the Indoor Football League in 2021, recording 49 tackles, one sack, one interception and four pass break ups. The Pirates won the United Bowl in 2021.

=== Philadelphia Stars ===
On March 10, 2022, Dixon was drafted by the Philadelphia Stars of the United States Football League.

=== Massachusetts Pirates (second stint) ===
Dixon signed with the Massachusetts Pirates of the Indoor Football League on July 17, 2023. He was released on August 28, 2023.

=== Statistics ===
| Year | League | Team | Games | | Tackles | | | | Interceptions | | | | | | Fumbles | | | |
| Year | League | Team | GP | GS | Cmb | Solo | Ast | Sck | PD | Int | Yds | Avg | Lng | TD | FF | FR | Yds | TD |
|---|---|---|---|---|---|---|---|---|---|---|---|---|---|---|---|---|---|---|
| 2014 | NFL | CHI | 5 | 0 | 3 | 2 | 1 | 0.0 | - | 0 | 0 | 0.0 | 0 | 0 | 0 | 1 | 0 | 0 |
| 2017 | CFL | EDM | 1 | 0 | 0 | 0 | 0 | 0.0 | - | 0 | 0 | 0 | 0 | 0 | 0 | 0 | 0 | 0 |
| 2020 | XFL | SEA | 5 | 4 | 45 | 31 | 14 | 0.0 | - | 0 | 0 | 0.0 | 0 | 0 | 0 | 0 | 0 | 0 |
| 2022 | USFL | PHI | 9 | 9 | 41 | 28 | 13 | 0.0 | 1 | 1 | 12 | 12.0 | 12 | 0 | 2 | 1 | 0 | 0 |
| Career | | | 20 | 13 | 89 | 61 | 18 | 0.0 | 1 | 1 | 12 | 12.0 | 12 | 0 | 2 | 2 | 0 | 0 |
