= Tre McBride =

American football player (born 1992)

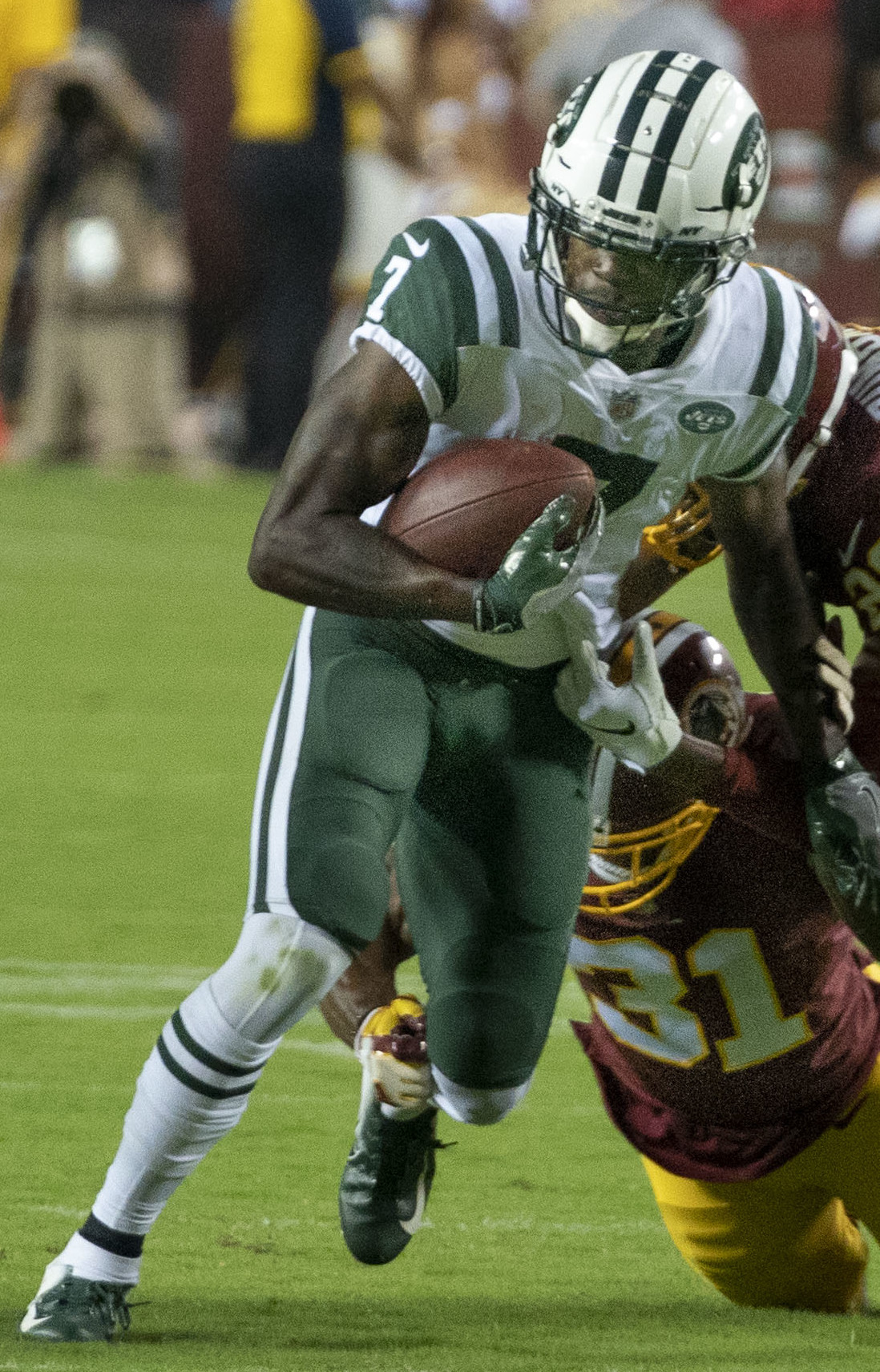
- McBride with the New York Jets in 2018

No. 16, 10, 18
- Position: Wide receiver

Personal information
- Born: December 1, 1992 (age 33); McDonough, Georgia, U.S.
- Listed height: 6 ft 0 in (1.83 m)
- Listed weight: 210 lb (95 kg)

Career information
- High school: Ola (McDonough)
- College: William & Mary
- NFL draft: 2015: 7th round, 245th overall pick

Career history
- Tennessee Titans (2015–2016); Chicago Bears (2017); New York Jets (2017–2018)*; Washington Redskins (2019)*; Jacksonville Jaguars (2019)*; DC Defenders (2020)*; Los Angeles Wildcats (2020)
- * Offseason or practice squad member only

Career NFL statistics
- Receptions: 10
- Receiving yards: 152
- Receiving touchdowns: 2
- Stats at Pro Football Reference

Tre McBride (born December 1, 1992) is an American former professional football player who was a wide receiver in the National Football League (NFL). He played college football for the William & Mary Tribe, and was selected by the Tennessee Titans in the seventh round of the 2015 NFL draft.

== Early life ==
McBride attended Ola High School in McDonough, Georgia. He played on the football team and had 1,500 all-purpose yards as a senior and 1,000 as a junior. He also lettered in basketball and track & field, where he had personal-bests of 24.00 seconds in the 200-meter dash, 1.83 meters (6 feet) in the high jump and 13.0 meters (42 feet, 6.5 inches) in the triple jump.

== College career ==
McBride played at the College of William & Mary from 2011 to 2014. As a freshman, he played in all 11 games and had 14 receptions for 146 yards. He was the first freshman wide receiver since 2005 to play for William & Mary. As a sophomore, McBride started all 11 games and led the team with 55 receptions for 897 yards and 10 touchdowns. As a junior, he started 11 of 12 games and again led the team with 63 receptions for 801 yards and five touchdowns. He was also the kick returner and led the team with 1,533 total all-purpose yards. As a senior, he had 64 receptions for 809 yards and four touchdowns. Against Villanova, he set the school record for most all-purpose yards in a game with 359.

== Professional career ==
=== Pre-draft ===
McBride played in the 2015 East–West Shrine Game, where he impressed and improved his stock for the 2015 NFL draft.

Pre-draft measurables
Height	Weight	Arm length	Hand span	40-yard dash	10-yard split	20-yard split	20-yard shuttle	Three-cone drill	Vertical jump	Broad jump	Bench press
6 ft 0 1/4 in (1.84 m)	210 lb (95 kg)	32 1/8 in (0.82 m)	9 in (0.23 m)	4.41 s	1.49 s	2.55 s	4.08 s	6.96 s	38.0 in (0.97 m)	10 ft 2 in (3.10 m)	16 reps
All values from NFL Combine

=== Tennessee Titans ===
McBride was selected by the Tennessee Titans in the seventh round, 245th overall, in the 2015 NFL draft. On September 5, 2015, he was waived and was signed to the practice squad the next day. On November 17, McBride was elevated to the active roster.

McBride was waived by the Titans on September 5, 2016. The next day, he was signed to the Titans' practice squad. He was promoted to the active roster on November 1. On September 2, 2017, McBride was waived by the Titans.

=== Chicago Bears ===
On September 3, 2017, McBride was claimed off waivers by the Chicago Bears. He was waived on September 23, and was re-signed to the practice squad. McBride was promoted back to the active roster on October 2. He was waived on November 28.

=== New York Jets ===
On December 1, 2017, McBride was signed to the New York Jets' practice squad. He signed a reserve/future contract with the Jets on January 1, 2018.

On September 1, 2018, McBride was waived by the Jets.

=== Washington Redskins ===
On January 2, 2019, McBride signed a reserve/future contract with the Washington Redskins, with him later being waived on April 30.

=== Jacksonville Jaguars ===
On June 13, 2019, McBride signed with the Jacksonville Jaguars. He was waived by Jacksonville on August 31.

=== DC Defenders ===
McBride was selected by the DC Defenders of the XFL in the 2nd round in the 2020 XFL draft.

=== Los Angeles Wildcats ===
McBride was traded to the Los Angeles Wildcats in exchange for wide receiver Rashad Ross on January 12, 2020. He had his contract terminated when the league suspended operations on April 10.
