= Winston Moss =

American football player and coach (born 1965)

No. 57, 58, 99, 55
- Position: Linebacker

Personal information
- Born: December 24, 1965 (age 60); Miami, Florida, U.S.
- Listed height: 6 ft 3 in (1.91 m)
- Listed weight: 245 lb (111 kg)

Career information
- High school: Miami Southridge (Miami, Florida)
- College: Miami (FL)
- NFL draft: 1987: 2nd round, 50th overall pick

Career history

Playing
- Tampa Bay Buccaneers (1987–1990); Los Angeles Raiders (1991–1994); Seattle Seahawks (1995–1997)

Coaching
- Seattle Seahawks (1998) Defensive quality control; New Orleans Saints (2000) Defensive quality control; New Orleans Saints (2001–2005) Linebackers coach; Green Bay Packers (2006) Linebackers coach; Green Bay Packers (2007–2018) Assistant head coach & linebackers coach; Los Angeles Wildcats (2020) Head coach & general manager

Awards and highlights
- Super Bowl champion (XLV); National champion (1983); Second-team All-South Independent (1986)

Career NFL statistics
- Games played: 169
- Total tackles: 431
- Sacks: 20.5
- Interceptions: 3
- Total touchdowns: 1
- Stats at Pro Football Reference

Head coaching record
- Career: 2–3 (.400) (XFL)

Winston N. Moss (born December 24, 1965) is an American former professional football player, coach and executive. He played as a linebacker in the National Football League (NFL).

Moss served as head coach and general manager of the Los Angeles Wildcats of the XFL. He was formerly the assistant head coach and linebackers coach for the NFL's Green Bay Packers.

Pre-draft measurables
Height	Weight	Arm length	Hand span	40-yard dash	10-yard split	20-yard split	20-yard shuttle	Vertical jump	Broad jump	Bench press
6 ft 3 1/4 in (1.91 m)	235 lb (107 kg)	31 1/2 in (0.80 m)	9 1/4 in (0.23 m)	4.69 s	1.71 s	2.78 s	4.36 s	30.0 in (0.76 m)	9 ft 3 in (2.82 m)	16 reps
All values from NFL Combine

He was selected by the Tampa Bay Buccaneers in the second round of the 1987 NFL draft. Moss attended Miami Southridge High School and was an all-state linebacker. He played college football for the Miami Hurricanes.

Moss also played for the Los Angeles Raiders and Seattle Seahawks.

== Coaching career ==
Moss began his coaching career in 1998 as a defensive quality control assistant for the Seattle Seahawks. He was hired by the New Orleans Saints in 2000 as defensive assistant/quality control; he was promoted to linebackers coach near the end of that season to replace John Bunting, who departed to become head coach at the University of North Carolina. Moss was hired by the Packers to become their linebackers coach on January 19, 2006. He was promoted to assistant head coach by head coach Mike McCarthy on January 15, 2007. Following a disappointing 2008 season for the Packers, Moss was the only major defensive coach not to be fired by McCarthy. In 2016, Moss led the Packers' coaching staff in coaching Team Irvin in the Pro Bowl, replacing McCarthy, who declined to travel to Hawaii due to illness. On December 4, 2018, just two days after McCarthy was fired as head coach, Moss was relieved of his coaching duties after thirteen seasons with the team.

On May 7, 2019, Moss was hired as the head coach and general manager of the Los Angeles Wildcats.

== Head coaching record ==
=== XFL ===
Team	Year	Regular season					Postseason			
Team	Year	Won	Lost	Ties	Win %	Finish	Won	Lost	Win %	Result
LAW	2020	2	3	0	.400	TBD	0	0	.000	Season ended
Total		2	3	0	.400		0	0	.000	
