= Storm Norton =

American football player (born 1994)

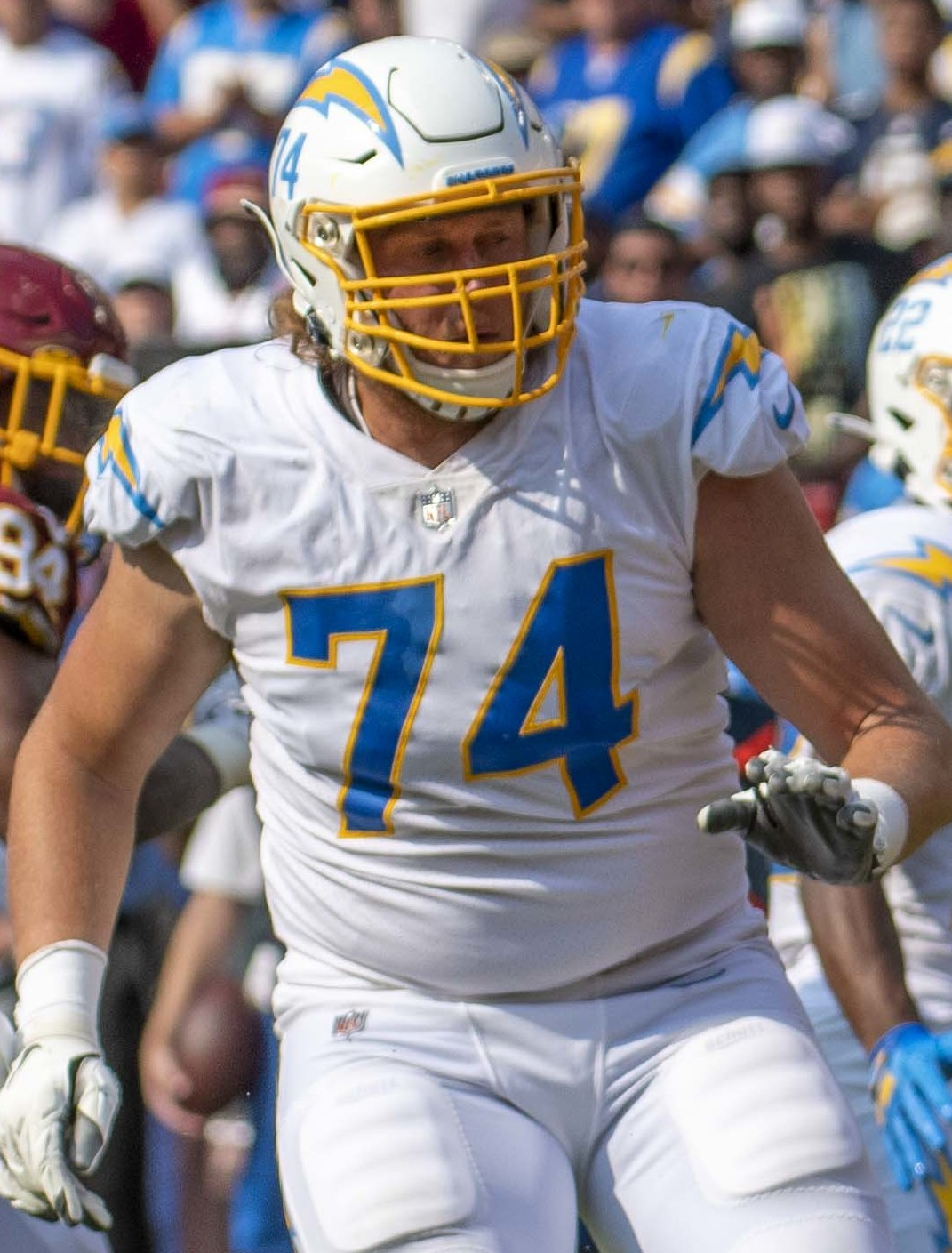
- Norton with the Los Angeles Chargers in 2021

No. 77 – Atlanta Falcons
- Position: Offensive tackle
- Roster status: Physically unable to perform

Personal information
- Born: May 16, 1994 (age 32); Toledo, Ohio, U.S.
- Listed height: 6 ft 7 in (2.01 m)
- Listed weight: 310 lb (141 kg)

Career information
- High school: Whitmer (Toledo)
- College: Toledo (2012–2016)
- NFL draft: 2017: undrafted

Career history
- Detroit Lions (2017); Arizona Cardinals (2017)*; Minnesota Vikings (2017–2019); Los Angeles Wildcats (2020); Los Angeles Chargers (2020–2022); New Orleans Saints (2023)*; Atlanta Falcons (2023–present)
- * Offseason or practice squad member only

Awards and highlights
- 2× First-team All-MAC (2015, 2016)

Career NFL statistics as of 2025
- Games played: 67
- Games started: 22
- Stats at Pro Football Reference

Storm Willis Norton (born May 16, 1994) is an American professional football offensive tackle for the Atlanta Falcons of the National Football League (NFL). He played college football for the Toledo Rockets and signed with the Detroit Lions as an undrafted free agent in 2017.

== Professional career ==
Pre-draft measurables
Height	Weight	Arm length	Hand span	Wingspan	40-yard dash	10-yard split	20-yard split	20-yard shuttle	Three-cone drill	Vertical jump	Broad jump	Bench press
6 ft 7 1/4 in (2.01 m)	307 lb (139 kg)	35 1/4 in (0.90 m)	10 1/8 in (0.26 m)	7 ft 0 7/8 in (2.16 m)	5.12 s	1.74 s	2.94 s	4.64 s	7.40 s	28.5 in (0.72 m)	8 ft 10 in (2.69 m)	15 reps
All values from Pro Day

=== Detroit Lions ===
Norton signed with the Detroit Lions as an undrafted free agent on May 12, 2017. He was waived by the Lions on September 2, and was re–signed to the Lions' practice squad the next day. Norton was promoted to the active roster on September 9. He was waived two days later and was re-signed to the practice squad. Norton was released by the Lions on September 25. He was re-signed to the team's practice squad on October 26, but was released a few days later.

=== Arizona Cardinals ===
On November 6, 2017, Norton was signed to the Arizona Cardinals' practice squad. On November 30, Norton was released by the Cardinals.

=== Minnesota Vikings ===
On December 12, 2017, Norton was signed to the Minnesota Vikings' practice squad. He was released on January 16, 2018. Norton signed a reserve/future contract with the Vikings on January 29.

On September 1, 2018, Norton was waived by the Vikings and was signed to the practice squad the next day. He was promoted to the active roster on October 27. He was waived again on November 3, and re-signed to the practice squad. He signed a reserve/future contract with the Vikings on January 2, 2019.

On August 31, 2019, Norton was waived by the Vikings.

=== Los Angeles Wildcats ===
Norton was selected by the Los Angeles Wildcats of the XFL with the first overall pick in the second phase of the 2020 XFL draft. Pro Football Focus named Norton as the highest rated offensive lineman during the COVID-19 pandemic shortened XFL season. He had his contract terminated when the league suspended operations on April 10, 2020.

=== Los Angeles Chargers ===
Norton signed with the Los Angeles Chargers on April 14, 2020.

=== New Orleans Saints ===
On March 16, 2023, Norton signed a one-year contract with the New Orleans Saints. He was released on August 29, and re-signed to the practice squad.

=== Atlanta Falcons ===
On September 26, 2023, Norton was signed by the Atlanta Falcons off of the Saints' practice squad. He made 14 appearances (three starts) for Atlanta during the season. In 2024, Norton played in all 17 games for the Falcons, including one start.

On August 22, 2025, it was announced that Norton would miss 6-to-8 weeks after undergoing ankle surgery. On October 22, Norton was designated to return from injured reserve. After his 21-day activation window closed on November 12, he reverted to season-ending injured reserve.

On June 11, 2026, Norton was placed on the reserve/physically unable to perform list.
