= Cedric Reed =

American football player (born 1992)

No. 56, 66, 94
- Position: Defensive end

Personal information
- Born: October 9, 1992 (age 34); Cleveland, Texas, U.S.
- Listed height: 6 ft 6 in (1.98 m)
- Listed weight: 271 lb (123 kg)

Career information
- High school: Cleveland (TX)
- College: Texas
- NFL draft: 2015: undrafted

Career history
- Buffalo Bills (2015)*; Miami Dolphins (2016)*; Los Angeles Wildcats (2020)
- * Offseason or practice squad member only

Awards and highlights
- First-team All-Big 12 (2013); Second-team All-Big 12 (2014)
- Stats at Pro Football Reference

Cedric Reed (born October 9, 1992) is an American former professional football defensive end. He was signed by the Buffalo Bills as an undrafted free agent in 2015. He played college football at Texas.

== College career ==
Reed made 32 starts for the Longhorns, tallying 37 career tackles for loss, 18 sacks, and six forced fumbles.

== Professional career ==
=== Buffalo Bills ===
Reed was signed by the Buffalo Bills as an undrafted free agent following the 2015 NFL draft. On August 31, 2015, he was released by the Bills. On September 11, 2015, the Bills signed Reed to their practice squad. On July 30, 2016, Reed was released by the Bills.

=== Miami Dolphins ===
Reed later signed with the Miami Dolphins. On September 3, 2016, he was released by the Dolphins as part of final roster cuts.

=== Los Angeles Wildcats ===
In October 2019, Reed was picked by the Los Angeles Wildcats as part of the 2020 XFL draft's open phase. He had his contract terminated when the league suspended operations on April 10, 2020.

== Personal life ==
Reed’s cousin, Jonathan Marshall, currently plays in the National Football League.
