= Los Angeles Wildcats (XFL) =

XFL (2020) team based in Los Angeles, California

Logo

General information
- Founded: 2018
- Folded: 2020 (2022 Officially)
- Headquartered: Los Angeles, California
- Colors: Black, red, light orange

Personnel
- Owner: Alpha Entertainment, LLC
- General manager: Winston Moss
- Head coach: Winston Moss
- President: Heather Brooks Karatz

Team history
- Los Angeles Wildcats (2020)

Home fields
- Dignity Health Sports Park (2020)

League / conference affiliations
- XFL (2020): West Division (2020)

The Los Angeles Wildcats (LA Wildcats) were a professional American football team based in the Los Angeles metropolitan area. The team was founded by Vince McMahon’s Alpha Entertainment and was an owned-and-operated member of the second XFL. The Wildcats played their home games at Dignity Health Sports Park. On March 8, 2020, the Wildcats played their final game against the Tampa Bay Vipers, which was the final XFL game before the league suspended operations due to the COVID-19 pandemic.

== History ==
On December 5, 2018, Los Angeles was announced as one of eight cities that would join the newly reformed XFL, as well as Seattle, Houston, Los Angeles, New York, St. Louis, Tampa Bay, and Dallas. On May 7, 2019, Winston Moss was announced as the team's head coach. On August 21, 2019, the team revealed its name, logos, and identity as the Los Angeles Wildcats, alongside the rest of the XFL teams. A secondary logo was released August 24.

On October 15, 2019, the Wildcats announced their first player in team history, being assigned former Birmingham Iron Quarterback Luis Perez, who was later traded to the New York Guardians.

On February 8, 2020, the team played its first game losing to the Houston Roughnecks 37–17 in Houston. Chad Kanoff scored the first touchdown in franchise history with a scramble left for a five-yard score. On February 23, 2020, the Wildcats earned their first win in franchise history, defeating the DC Defenders 39–9. On March 8, 2020, the Wildcats came from behind to win against the Tampa Bay Vipers 41–34 in what was the final game of the 2020 iteration of the XFL. On March 12, 2020, The XFL announced that the remainder of the 2020 XFL season had been cancelled due to the COVID-19 pandemic. The team finished with a 2–3 record. On April 10, 2020, the XFL suspended operations, with all of the league's employees, players, and staff terminated.

On July 24, 2022, the XFL announced its reactivation for the 2023 season, and confirmed that the Wildcats would not return for that season. On October 31, 2022, the league announced that the Wildcats' place in the league was taken by the San Antonio Brahmas.

== Final roster ==
2020 Los Angeles Wildcats final roster
Quarterbacks: 8 Josh Johnson; 3 Chad Kanoff; 2 Jalan McClendon; Running backs: 31 Terrell Alex; 28 Martez Carter; 38 Winston Dimel FB; 41 DuJuan Harris; 34 Elijah Hood; 24 Larry Rose; Wide receivers: -- Sergio Bailey; 80 Saeed Blacknall; 17 Jalen Greene; 18 Adonis Jennings; 15 Tre McBride; 84 Jordan Smallwood; 11 Nelson Spruce; Tight ends: 88 De'Quan Hampton; 85 Ryan O'Malley	Offensive linemen: 65 Sean Brown T; 59 Fred Lauina G; 75 Lene Maiava T; 72 Storm Norton T; 73 Jaelin Robinson T; 74 Tyler Roemer T; 56 Nico Siragusa G; 66 Patrick Vahe C; 62 Dwayne Wallace G; Defensive linemen: 99 Latarius Brady DE; 90 Roderick Henderson NT; 97 Reggie Howard NT; 95 Alex Jenkins DE; 77 Shawn Oakman DE; 91 Boogie Roberts DE; 96 Andrew Stelter NT; 98 Devin Taylor DE	Linebackers: 53 Alex Funches; 50 Quentin Gause ILB; 54 Taiwan Jones ILB; 59 Victor Ochi OLB; 94 Cedric Reed OLB; 57 Will Smith ILB; 52 Tre' Williams ILB; Defensive backs: 35 Bryce Cheek CB; 22 Jerome Couplin S; 21 Mar'Sean Diggs S; 36 Ahmad Dixon S; 20 Jaylen Dunlap CB; 27 Harlan Miller CB; 33 Arrion Springs CB; 23 Mike Stevens CB; 30 Bradley Sylve CB; 47 Roman Tatum CB; 29 Jack Tocho S; 32 LaDarius Wiley S; Special teams: 45 Ryan Navarro LS; 4 Giorgio Tavecchio K; 7 Shane Tripucka P	Reserve lists: 82 Brandon Barnes TE (IR); 77 Ryan Cummings G (IR); 70 Toa Lobendahn G (IR); 44 Willie Mays OLB (IR); 70 Kahlil McKenzie G/C (IR); 78 Anthony Morris OT (IR); 9 Nick Novak K (IR); -- Damian Prince OT (IR); 93 Trevon Sanders DE (IR); 6 Colton Schmidt P (IR); 57 active, 10 inactive

== Staff ==
2020 Los Angeles Wildcats staff
Front office: Director of player personnel – Joey Clinkscales; Director of football operations – Charles Bailey; Manager of football operations – Ty Knott; Head coaches: General manager/Head coach – Winston Moss; Assistant head coach/tight ends – Ty Knott; Offensive coaches: Offensive coordinator/quarterbacks – Norm Chow; Running backs – Dave Atkins; Receivers – Mike Wilson; Offensive line – Jerry Fontenot; Offensive quality control – Kade Rannings	Defensive coaches: Defensive line – Vince Amey; Defensive backs – Otis Smith; Defensive quality control – Al Brown; Special teams coaches: Special teams coordinator/safeties – Martin Bayless

== Player history ==
=== Current NFL players ===
XFL Season	Pos	Name	NFL team
2020	QB	Josh Johnson	Cincinnati Bengals

=== Notable players ===
XFL Season	Pos	Name	Notes
2020	RB	DuJuan Harris	Former Green Bay Packers Running Back
2020	P	Colton Schmidt	Former Buffalo Bills Punter
2020	K	Nick Novak	Former San Diego Chargers Kicker

== Coach history ==
=== Head coach history ===
#	Name	Term	Regular season				Playoffs			Awards
#	Name	Term	GC	W	L	Win %	GC	W	L	Awards
Los Angeles Wildcats
1	Winston Moss	2020	5	2	3	.400	–	–	–	

=== Offensive coordinator history ===
#	Name	Term	Regular season				Playoffs			Awards
#	Name	Term	GC	W	L	Win %	GC	W	L	Awards
Los Angeles Wildcats
1	Norm Chow	2020	5	2	3	.400	–	–	–	

=== Defensive coordinator history ===
#	Name	Term	Regular season				Playoffs			Awards
#	Name	Term	GC	W	L	Win %	GC	W	L	Awards
Los Angeles Wildcats
1	Pepper Johnson	2020	1	0	1	.000	–	–	–	
2	Winston Moss	2020	4	2	2	.500	–	–	–	

== Rivalries ==
=== Overall regular season record vs. opponents ===
Team	Record	Win %
Vegas Vipers	1–0	1.000
DC Defenders	1–0	1.000
Houston Roughnecks	0–1	.000
Orlando Guardians	0–1	.000
Arlington Renegades	0–1	.000
Seattle Sea Dragons	0–0	N/A
St. Louis Battlehawks	0–0	N/A

=== Season-by-season record ===
Season	Team	League	Conference	Division	Regular season			Postseason results	Awards	Head coaches	Pct.
Season	Team	League	Conference	Division	Finish	W	L	Postseason results	Awards	Head coaches	Pct.
2020	2020	XFL		West	3rd	2	3	Season suspended after 5 games due to COVID-19		Winston Moss	.400

== Records ==
All-time WIldcats leaders
Leader	Player	Record	Years with Wildcats
Passing yards	Josh Johnson	1,092 passing yards	2020
Passing Touchdowns	Josh Johnson	11 passing touchdowns	2020
Rushing yards	Elijah Hood	78 rushing yards	2020
Rushing Touchdowns	Martez Carter	2 rushing touchdowns	2020
Receiving yards	Nelson Spruce	267 receiving yards	2020
Receiving Touchdowns	Tre McBride	4 receiving touchdowns	2020
Receptions	Nelson Spruce	20 receptions	2020
Tackles	Ahmad Dixon	45 tackles	2020
Sacks	Cedric Reed	3.0 sacks	2020
Interceptions	Mike Stevens Jack Tocho	2 Interceptions 2 Interceptions	2020 2020
Coaching wins	Winston Moss	2 wins	2020

== Market overview ==
Los Angeles is one of two cities to have also hosted a team in the original XFL, the other being New York/New Jersey; the Los Angeles Xtreme was the champion of the earlier XFL in the league's only season. (A third broader megalopolis, Central Florida, has also hosted teams in both the 2001 and 2020 incarnations of the league.)

As television networks have traditionally required alternative leagues to field teams in New York and Los Angeles to secure television coverage without brokering the airtime, Southern California has a long history of alternative professional teams. In addition to the Xtreme, the city has hosted: the Los Angeles Avengers, LA KISS, Anaheim Piranhas and Los Angeles Cobras in the Arena Football League; the Los Angeles Express in the USFL; the Southern California Sun in the World Football League; the Orange County Ramblers and short-lived Long Beach Admirals in the Continental Football League; and numerous teams in the Pacific Coast Professional Football League in the 1930s and 1940s.

The Wildcats were in one of the most heavily crowded sports markets in the United States, competing for sports dollars against two NFL teams (Los Angeles Rams and Los Angeles Chargers), two NHL teams (Los Angeles Kings and Anaheim Ducks), two NBA teams (Los Angeles Lakers and Los Angeles Clippers), multiple NCAA Division I college basketball and college football programs, and in March and April, both the LA Galaxy and Los Angeles FC in MLS and the Los Angeles Dodgers and Los Angeles Angels in the MLB
