= Dana Dimel =

American football player and coach (1962–2024)

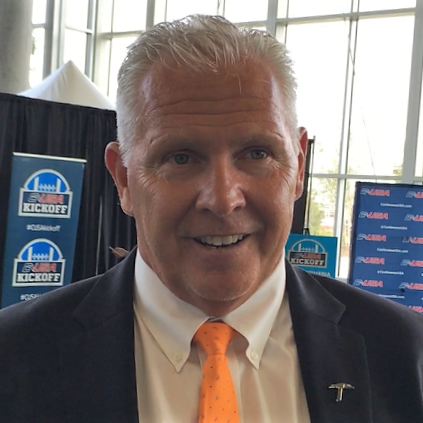
- Dimel in 2018

Biographical details
- Born: October 9, 1962; Columbus, Ohio, U.S.
- Died: December 3, 2024 (aged 62); Champaign, Illinois, U.S.

Playing career
- 1982–1983: Hutchinson
- 1984–1986: Kansas State
- 1987: Minnesota Vikings*
- Positions: Defensive lineman, tackle

Coaching career (HC unless noted)
- 1987–1988: Kansas State (GA)
- 1989–1992: Kansas State (OL)
- 1993–1994: Kansas State (RGC/OL)
- 1995–1996: Kansas State (OC)
- 1997–1999: Wyoming
- 2000–2002: Houston
- 2005: Kansas State (GA)
- 2006–2007: Arizona (TE)
- 2008: Arizona (TE/RB)
- 2009–2017: Kansas State (OC/RB/TE)
- 2018–2023: UTEP
- 2024: Illinois (senior off. assistant)

Head coaching record
- Overall: 50–88
- Bowls: 0–1

Dana August Dimel (October 9, 1962 – December 3, 2024) was an American college football coach and player. He served as the head football coach of the University of Wyoming from 1997 to 1999, the University of Houston from 2000 to 2002, and the University of Texas at El Paso (UTEP) from 2018 to 2023, compiling a career head coaching record of 50–88. Dimel also coached as an assistant at Kansas State University and the University of Arizona.

== Playing career ==
Dimel played high school football at Upper Arlington High School in Upper Arlington, Ohio. He was named First Team All-Central Ohio League as a defensive linemen in 1980. Dimel then played at Hutchinson Community College before signing with Kansas State University.

After one season on the defensive line, Dimel made the switch to offensive tackle for his final two years at Kansas State. He was named All-American by the National Strength and Conditioning Association. He was signed by the Minnesota Vikings of the National Football League (NFL) as a free agent in June 1987 and released in August.

Dimel was named to the Kansas State all decade team for the 1980s.

== Coaching career ==
Dimel was a long-time assistant during his first stint at Kansas State under Bill Snyder, from 1987 to 1996. Dimel was instrumental in four consecutive Top 20 final rankings. As the offensive coordinator in 1995 and 1996, the Wildcats won nineteen games and finished sixth and seventeenth in the coaches' poll in respective years.

From 1997 to 1999, Dimel was the head football coach at the University of Wyoming, and compiled a 22–13 record. At the time he became head coach, he was the youngest head coach in Division I-A.

In 2000, after Dimel's rapid success at Wyoming, he became the head coach at the University of Houston. Previous success would not follow him to Houston, however. During his three seasons the Cougars compiled an 8–26 record—including an 0–11 season in 2001, the worst in school history.

In 2006, Dimel became the tight ends coach at the University of Arizona. In October 2006, he took over as running game coordinator for the team as well. After his promotion, the Wildcats beat three top 25 teams.

Dimel returned to Kansas State, and helped them to a 21–5 record over the 2011 and 2012 seasons. The Wildcats finished in the Top 15 each season and quarterback Collin Klein was a finalist for the Heisman Trophy. In 2012, Kansas State was crowned champions of the Big 12 and earned a trip to the Fiesta Bowl.

In December 2017, Dimel was named the head coach at UTEP. UTEP fired Dimel following the 2023 season.

On July 22, 2024, Dimel was hired as a senior offensive assistant for Illinois under head coach Bret Bielema.

== Personal life and death ==
From 1999 until his death, Dimel was married to Julie Josephson Dimel. They had a son and daughter together. Their son, Winston, was a fullback for his father at UTEP in 2018.

Dimel died in his sleep in Champaign, Illinois, on December 3, 2024, at the age of 62.

== Head coaching record ==
Year	Team	Overall	Conference	Standing	Bowl/playoffs
Wyoming Cowboys (Western Athletic Conference) (1997–1998)
1997	Wyoming	7–6	4–4	T–4th (Pacific)	
1998	Wyoming	8–3	6–2	2nd (Mountain)	
Wyoming Cowboys (Mountain West Conference) (1999)
1999	Wyoming	7–4	4–3	4th	
Wyoming:		22–13	14–9		
Houston Cougars (Conference USA) (2000–2002)
2000	Houston	3–8	2–5	T–7th	
2001	Houston	0–11	0–7	10th	
2002	Houston	5–7	3–5	8th	
Houston:		8–26	5–17		
UTEP Miners (Conference USA) (2018–2023)
2018	UTEP	1–11	1–7	T–6th (West)	
2019	UTEP	1–11	0–8	7th (West)	
2020	UTEP	3–5	0–4	7th (West)	
2021	UTEP	7–6	4–4	4th (West)	L New Mexico
2022	UTEP	5–7	3–5	T–7th	
2023	UTEP	3–9	2–6	T–6th	
UTEP:		20–49	10–34		
Total:		50–88			
