= Winston Dimel =

American football player (born 1995)

No. 38
- Position: Fullback

Personal information
- Born: October 9, 1995 (age 31); Manhattan, Kansas, U.S.
- Listed height: 6 ft 1 in (1.85 m)
- Listed weight: 242 lb (110 kg)

Career information
- High school: Manhattan
- College: Kansas State (2014–2017); UTEP (2018)
- NFL draft: 2019: undrafted

Career history
- Seattle Seahawks (2019)*; Los Angeles Wildcats (2020); Pittsburgh Maulers (2022)
- * Offseason or practice squad member only

Winston M. Dimel (born October 9, 1995) is an American former professional football fullback. He played college football at Kansas State and UTEP.

== College career ==
=== Kansas State ===
After graduating high school, Dimel enrolled at Kansas State, where in his first year he redshirted.

After being a redshirt throughout the 2014 season, Dimel started 13 games at fullback, recording 28 rushing attempts for 86 yards and 6 touchdowns. Receiving, he had 8 catches for 261 yards and 2 touchdowns. By the end of the season he earned First-team All-Big 12 (Coaches) and First-team Academic All-Big 12.

In 2016, Dimel started 13 games again at fullback, making 30 rush attempts for 92 yards and 12 touchdowns. Receiving, he had 6 catches for 66 yards. At the end of the season he was named Second-team Academic All-Big 12, First-team All-Big 12 (Coaches) and Third-team All-Big 12 (Phil Steele).

For his last season at Kansas State, Dimel started all 13 games at fullback. He had 19 rush attempts for 63 yards and 4 touchdowns, while recording 8 catches for 91 yards and 1 touchdown receiving. At the end of the season he earned Second-team Academic All-Big 12, Preseason All-Big 12, Third-team All-Big 12 (Phil Steele), and Second-team All-Big 12 (Coaches).

=== UTEP ===
After playing with Kansas State he transferred to UTEP, where his father Dana Dimel became the head coach. In his only season with the team, Dimel played in just 6 games. On the ground he had 4 rush attempts for -3 yards and receiving he had 9 catches for 89 yards. At the end of the season he was named to the C-USA Commissioner's Honor Roll.

== Professional career ==
Pre-draft measurables
Height	Weight	Arm length	Hand span	40-yard dash	10-yard split	20-yard split	20-yard shuttle	Three-cone drill	Vertical jump	Broad jump
6 ft 0 1/8 in (1.83 m)	232 lb (105 kg)	28 3/4 in (0.73 m)	8 5/8 in (0.22 m)	4.78 s	1.68 s	2.76 s	4.46 s	7.20 s	33.5 in (0.85 m)	9 ft 4 in (2.84 m)
All values from NFL Combine/Pro Day

=== Seattle Seahawks ===
After going undrafted in 2019 Dimel was signed by the Seattle Seahawks on May 3, 2019.

=== Los Angeles Wildcats ===
On February 25, 2020, Dimel was signed by the Los Angeles Wildcats. He played in 2 games where he had 1 catch for 8 yards. He had his contract terminated when the league suspended operations on April 10, 2020.

=== Pittsburgh Maulers ===
On March 10, 2022, Dimel was drafted by the Pittsburgh Maulers of the United States Football League (USFL).
