= XFL (2020–2023) =

Professional American football league

- Most recent season or competition: 2023 XFL season
- Classification: Spring football league
- Sport: American football
- Founded: January 25, 2018
- Founder: Vince McMahon
- First season: 2020
- Folded: December 31, 2023 (Merged into UFL); October 7, 2025 (conference dissolved)
- Owners: XFL Properties LLC; (RedBird Capital Partners); (Dwayne Johnson); (Dany Garcia)
- President: Russ Brandon
- Motto: "For the love of football" (2020 edition)
- No. of teams: 8
- Country: United States
- Headquarters: Centerfield Office Building; Arlington, Texas, U.S.
- Last champions: Arlington Renegades (1st title)
- Most titles: Arlington Renegades (1 title)
- Broadcasters: United States: ABC/ESPN/ESPN2/FX; International: See list
- Streaming partners: United States: ESPN+
- Related competitions: Direct: USFL, UFL, TSL; Affiliated: IFL; Other: NFL, CFL, AAF, FXFL
- Website: xfl.com

The XFL was a professional American football minor league consisting of eight teams located across the United States in mid-sized to major markets. The XFL league headquarters were in Stamford, Connecticut in 2020, and Arlington, Texas in 2023.

The league was founded by WWE executive Vince McMahon in 2018, as a continuation successor to the league of the same name he founded in 2001. McMahon founded the new XFL to create a league with fewer off-field controversies and faster, simpler play compared to the bigger National Football League (NFL), and one without the features inspired by professional wrestling or entertainment elements of its predecessor. The league and its eight teams were originally owned by McMahon's Alpha Entertainment. Seasons ran from February to May, with each of the league's teams playing a ten-game regular season, and four progressing to the playoffs to crown a season champion.

After only five weeks of play in its inaugural 2020 season, the league abruptly ceased play due to the COVID-19 pandemic, and filed for bankruptcy on April 13. In August 2020, actor and professional wrestler Dwayne Johnson, along with longtime business partner and ex-wife Dany Garcia, led a consortium to purchase the XFL for $15 million. The league returned to play on February 18, 2023, positioned as a minor league.

The XFL operated in the winter and early spring months, after the end of the NFL season and before the start of the USFL season. The league had a player personnel partnership with the Indoor Football League (IFL), with the IFL functioning as the XFL's de facto minor league.

On September 28, 2023, the XFL announced its intention to merge with the United States Football League. On November 30, 2023, the leagues issued a statement that they "completed the antitrust review process in connection with the proposed merger of the XFL and USFL and intend to play a combined season this spring kicking off on Saturday, March 30. We are now finalizing terms of the definitive agreement". On December 31, the name of the combined league was confirmed as the United Football League, with each component league surviving as a conference within the UFL. For the following two seasons, the XFL operated as a conference within the UFL.

The XFL was formally dissolved as a conference on October 7, 2025. As of that date, three XFL teams have survived: the St. Louis Battlehawks, DC Defenders and Dallas Renegades. XFL Properties LLC remains the UFL's legal owner.

== History ==
=== Original XFL (2001) ===
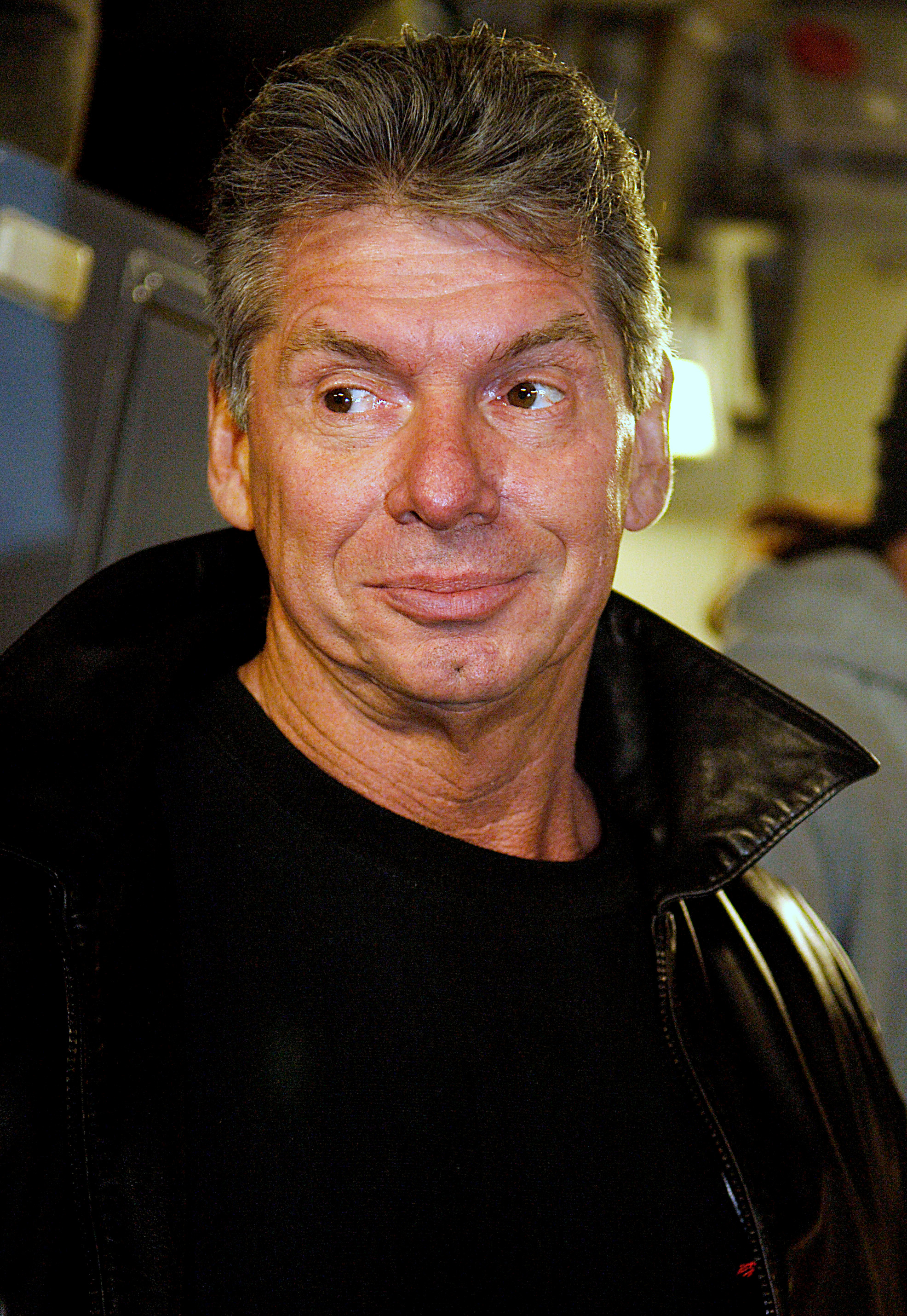
Vince McMahon, the founder of Alpha Entertainment, LLC

The original XFL ran for a single season in 2001, as a joint venture between the World Wrestling Federation (WWF) and NBC spearheaded by Vince McMahon and NBC executive Dick Ebersol. The league attempted to be a competitor to the National Football League (NFL)—the predominant professional league of American football in the United States (and where NBC had lost its broadcast rights to CBS three years earlier), running during the late winter and early spring to take advantage of lingering desire for football after the end of the NFL season. It featured various modifications to the rules of football in order to increase its intensity, as well as on-air innovations such as Skycams, placing microphones on players, and in-game interviews with players. The league was criticized for relying too heavily on "sports entertainment" gimmicks similar to professional wrestling and for a football product that was exceptionally inept (in the words of Bob Costas, "mediocre high school football"). Despite strong ratings for its first games, viewership eventually nosedived, and the league folded after the conclusion of the inaugural season. Both partners lost $35 million on the XFL, and McMahon eventually conceded that the league was a "colossal failure".

=== Rebuild ===
In the 2017 ESPN 30 for 30 documentary This Was the XFL, McMahon openly mused about reviving the XFL, noting that changes would need to be made compared to 2001 to make it viable and relevant in the modern era. McMahon had purchased the trademarks of the defunct United Football League (UFL) and an alternative brand, "UrFL" (Your Football League), in early 2017. The following year, the director of the documentary, Charlie Ebersol (son of Dick Ebersol), would go on to help form the Alliance of American Football (AAF) in 2018, hoping to beat the revived XFL in being the first to play (by a year). While the league was able to launch in 2019, a year before the XFL's first season, it went bankrupt before its first season finished after it twice lost its major investors. On December 15, 2017, Bleacher Report columnist Brad Shepard reported that McMahon was seriously considering a revival of the XFL, with an expected announcement on January 25, 2018. In a statement to Deadspin, WWE did not confirm or deny the rumors, but did state that McMahon was establishing a new company known as Alpha Entertainment, which would "explore investment opportunities across the sports and entertainment landscapes, including professional football." On December 21, 2017, WWE issued a filing to the Securities and Exchange Commission, stating that McMahon had sold $100 million worth of WWE stock to fund Alpha Entertainment. Alpha Entertainment was headquartered next door to WWE headquarters in Stamford, Connecticut.

On January 25, 2018, Alpha Entertainment announced a new incarnation of the XFL, which would begin with a 10-week inaugural season beginning in January or February 2020. In a press conference, McMahon stated that the new XFL would be dissimilar to its previous incarnation, stating that "There's only so many things that have 'FL' on the end of them and those are already taken. But we aren't going to have much of what the original XFL had." McMahon stated that the league would feature eight teams as a single entity owned by Alpha (the previous XFL was also a single-entity league), which had been revealed in 2019. Alpha Entertainment was established to keep the league's management and operations separate from that of WWE. McMahon is prepared to invest as much as $500 million, five times as much as his investment in the 2001 XFL. He liquidated an additional $270 million in WWE stock (representing a 4% stake in WWE) in March 2019 to provide additional funding for the league.

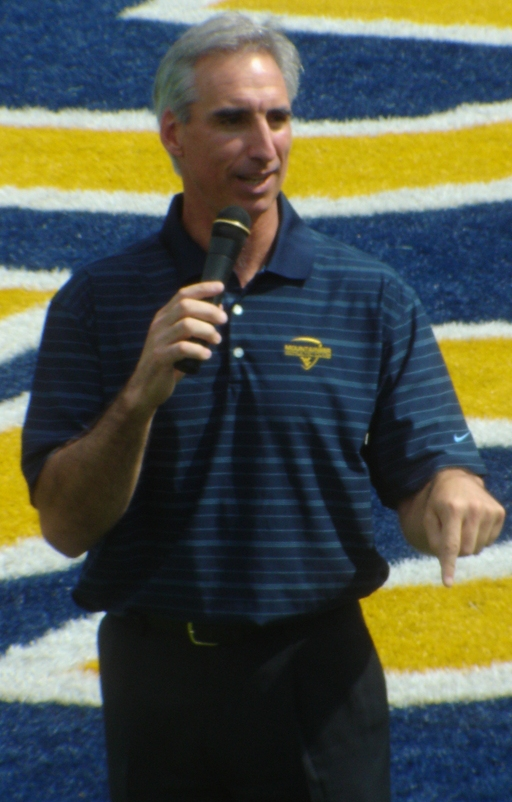
Oliver Luck, former commissioner of the XFL

The XFL under McMahon discouraged political gestures by players during games such as, for example, taking a knee in protest. McMahon also planned to forbid any player with a criminal record from participating. Commissioner Oliver Luck later walked back the latter decision, noting that the policy had not yet been finalized, and stated in April 2019 that it would allow its teams to sign Johnny Manziel, who was convicted of domestic violence in 2016. Manziel nonetheless was excluded from the inaugural draft and player allocations, with the league later stating that it had "no interest" in him. Felony convictions are still a disqualification. McMahon justified his intentions by stating that the XFL would be "evaluating a player based on many things, including the quality of human being they are", and that "people don't want social and political issues coming into play when they are trying to be entertained". He suggested that players who wish to express political opinions should do so on their time. Luck stated in October 2018 that the ban on protesting during the national anthem would be written into player contracts as a condition of employment and that the stipulation was McMahon's idea; Luck agreed that the league aimed to be as non-political as possible. Players were not barred from using cannabis, as the league did not test for the drug.

McMahon did not initially reveal any specific details on rule changes that the new XFL would feature but did state that he aimed to reduce the length of games to around two hours (in contrast to the standard in American football, which generally runs slightly over three hours). The league later revised this to a two-and-a-half-hour target length. Later, when announcing new changes to overtime rules, it was implied that television broadcasts would have three-hour time slots, into which the entire game and overtime would fit. Test games resulted in an average game time of 2 hours and 40 minutes with a comparable number of plays to an NFL game. Halfway through the first season, the average length of a regular-season game clocked in at 2 hours, 50 minutes, the same as the Canadian Football League. He also noted that by announcing it two years in advance (unlike the original XFL, which was only announced one year in advance), there would also be more time to prepare the league to deliver a more desirable product. McMahon said the timing of the announcement was not meant to coincide with a recent ratings downturn being experienced by the NFL, adding, "What has happened there is their business, and I'm not going to knock those guys, but I am going to learn from their mistakes as anyone would if they were tasked with reimagining a new football league."

On June 5, 2018, Oliver Luck was named the league's commissioner and chief executive officer. Luck left his previous positions with the NCAA to take over the operations of the XFL. Doug Whaley, most recently general manager of the Buffalo Bills, was hired as the league's senior vice president of football operations on November 8, 2018. On January 22, 2019, Jeffrey Pollack was named the president and chief operating officer, coming from his previous role as the chief marketing and strategy officer and special adviser for the Los Angeles Chargers.

McMahon stated that he wanted to play in existing NFL markets but did not identify potential cities specifically and did not rule out any specific cities. McMahon also did not rule out playing on artificial turf. The original XFL avoided artificial playing surfaces (as most such surfaces then were more carpet-like); however, the technology advanced considerably since 2001, with modern artificial turfs mimicking real grass more closely. John Shumway from KDKA-TV in Pittsburgh and local media from Orlando and San Diego both inquired about potential teams in their respective cities, but McMahon (while stating that "I love Pittsburgh") declined to name any cities for teams. McMahon also stated that teams would have new identities compared to recycling old identities from the old league. The league sent solicitations to thirty metropolitan areas as potential locations for a team.

Commissioner Luck announced the eight host cities and stadiums for the first franchises on December 5, 2018, and also announced the starting date of February 8, 2020, the weekend after Super Bowl LIV, the date on which its first two games were later played. Its first head coach and general manager, Dallas's Bob Stoops, was announced February 7, 2019, with the coaches for Seattle (Jim Zorn), DC (Pep Hamilton), and Tampa Bay (Marc Trestman) following later in the month. The last of the inaugural head coaches, Houston's June Jones, was hired May 13 and introduced May 20. The emergence of the Alliance of American Football created issues selecting cities to host XFL teams, as many potential candidates became home to AAF teams (notably Orlando, the next largest city without an NFL team and an acceptable stadium. Orlando was also one of the original XFL's most successful markets and second in attendance for the 2019 AAF season). Not wanting teams to compete against other spring football teams in the same market, the XFL chose different cities than the AAF.

The league chose to focus on placing teams in large media markets, selecting five of the top seven largest media markets in the U.S.; based on 2017 census bureau estimates, all eight 2020 XFL markets had over 2.9 million residents each (the smallest being St. Louis). This was seen as a stark contrast to the other emerging spring football league, the Alliance of American Football, which primarily chose markets without NFL teams, seen as a decision to avoid competing with existing fan bases; two of the AAF's markets (Birmingham and Memphis, which both had teams in the first XFL) had populations less than half that of St. Louis's. The only 2020 XFL market that did not host an NFL team was St. Louis, which in 2015 saw its NFL team (the Rams) return to Los Angeles.

In May 2019, the XFL placed a bid on some of the AAF's former assets as part of that league's bankruptcy proceedings. The league was outbid by former Arena Football League executive Jerry Kurz. Several months earlier in December 2018, Charlie Ebersol asked Vince McMahon about merging the AAF (which had then yet to start its ultimately-aborted sole season) with the XFL. McMahon turned him down.

The league signed its first player, quarterback Landry Jones, on August 15, 2019. The XFL revealed team names and logos on August 21, 2019. Players were assigned to each team in the 2020 XFL draft from October 15 to 16, with schedules released October 22 and ticket sales opening to the general public October 24. Uniforms were revealed December 3.

In the week leading up to the kickoff, the XFL secured sponsorships from Gatorade and Anheuser-Busch. The Anheuser-Busch sponsorship was used to promote Bud Light Seltzer; the "seltzer chug" became a postgame locker room tradition in part because of the product placement deal. After averaging 3.1 million viewers in its first week, average ratings for the XFL would drop to 1.5 million viewers during its fifth and final week.

Former logo of the XFL, used for their 2020 season

=== Mid-season cancellation ===
On March 12, 2020, the league canceled the remainder of its regular-season games over concerns related to the COVID-19 pandemic; similar concerns led other major sports leagues, including the NBA, NHL, MLS, MLB, MLR seasons and NCAA to suspend or cancel games. The announcement came after a Seattle Dragons player, who self-reported symptoms to his team's medical staff, had been tested for coronavirus but had not yet received his results (the unnamed player eventually tested positive). Although teams only played five games, the league announced it would pay all players their base salary for the rest of the season; players who received legitimate offers from the NFL or Canadian Football League (CFL) would be allowed to sign with those teams but with a clause requiring them to return to their XFL teams if the league were able to hold its championship game. At the time, the league still planned on having a 2021 season; it was exploring relocating as many as three of its teams, with the league contacting authorities in San Antonio, Texas, in early April about potentially placing a franchise there. Other potential 2021 actions included moving the Tampa Bay Vipers to Orlando and the New York Guardians to a smaller New Jersey stadium, Red Bull Arena.

On April 10, 2020, league president Jeffrey Pollack informed employees on a conference call that the league was suspending operations and that all employees would be terminated. Three days later, on April 13, the league filed for Chapter 11 bankruptcy protection, stating that the coronavirus pandemic had deprived the league of tens of millions of dollars in revenue. With the bankruptcy filing, the league put itself up for sale and began the process of seeking a buyer to maximize the value of its assets to pay off creditors. Luck, who had returned home to Indiana March 13, was fired from his position before the bankruptcy filing, which led him to sue McMahon personally for wrongful termination on April 21.

On May 20, 2020, the league made its first actions toward resuming operations by asking authorities in St. Louis, Houston and Seattle to reinstate stadium lease agreements that it had previously been attempting to discharge in the bankruptcy.

On May 26, 2020, court filings in the XFL bankruptcy case revealed key dates surrounding the possible sale of the league. As part of the bankruptcy agreement, McMahon agreed not to buy back the XFL. The deadline to file as a bidder was set for July 30, the auction was scheduled to take place August 3 and the sale hearing was set for August 7 at 10 am. However, court documents which were made public on July 28, 2020, revealed that the XFL would not sell unless they successfully negotiated a new broadcasting agreement.

On July 1, 2020, ESPN filed a motion in court stating that they would be willing to consider broadcasting the XFL again under new ownership, but also made clear they would not hold any stake in XFL assets. ESPN even stated that the XFL's "services, skills and talents are not fungible." On July 23, 2020, Fox also filed a motion in court which signaled a willingness to broadcast the XFL as well, but only under the condition that a new league owner could negotiate a new broadcasting agreement. Fox described the XFL as a "Debtor". On July 28, 2020, it was revealed that ABC had joined Fox and ESPN in calling for new television deals via the court system. It was also reported that ESPN, which is also connected to ABC, wanted to sever ties with the XFL. However, Fox was still open to continuing negotiations with the XFL, but wanted new terms for any future broadcasting agreement and was noncommittal. Fox briefly considered purchasing the XFL in partnership with RedBird Capital Partners, but ultimately decided to instead launch the United States Football League in 2022.

=== Sale and relaunch ===
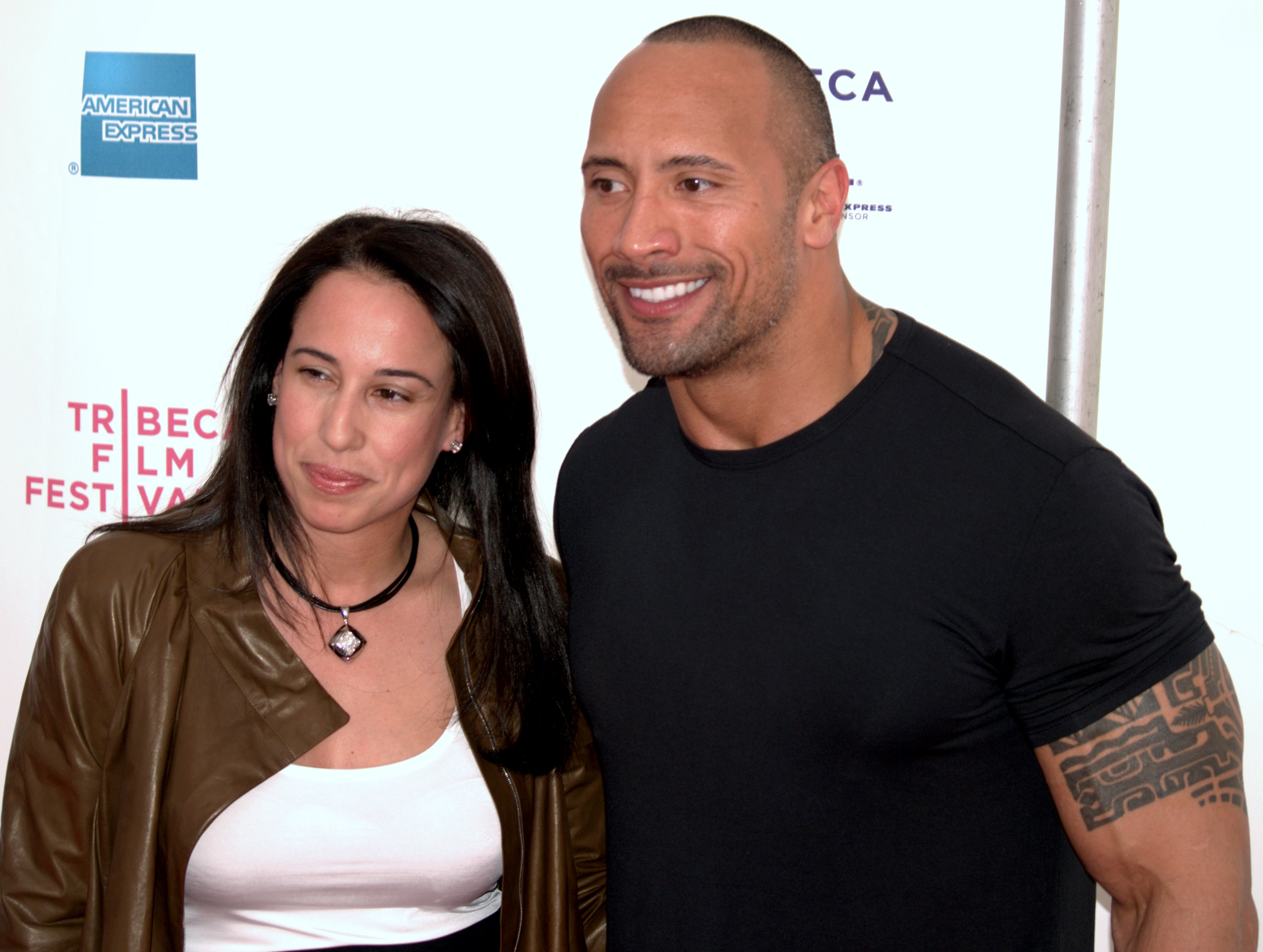
Dany Garcia and Dwayne Johnson led the consortium that purchased the XFL out of bankruptcy in August 2020.

On August 3, 2020, it was reported that a consortium led by Dwayne "The Rock" Johnson, Dany Garcia, and Gerry Cardinale (through Cardinale's fund RedBird Capital Partners) purchased the XFL for $15 million just hours before an auction could take place; the purchase received court approval on August 7, 2020. The XFL's parent company originally listed the league with assets and liabilities in the range of $10 million to $50 million. Johnson, who previously worked for McMahon as WWE wrestler The Rock, played collegiate football with the Miami Hurricanes in the 1990s and as a professional with the Calgary Stampeders of the Canadian Football League; he and Garcia were married from 1997 to 2007 and have remained business partners since their divorce. Cardinale's previous investments included the New York Yankees' side projects (such as YES Network and Legends Hospitality) and Suddenlink Communications. On August 21, 2020, the transition of ownership was completed, with Johnson stating "The deal is officially closed and 'the keys' to the XFL have been handed over." On October 1, 2020, the XFL announced its return in spring 2022. Johnson and Garcia both stated that they would rescind the policy forbidding kneeling during the national anthem and would instead openly support and encourage such behavior in an October 14 interview with Vice.

==== CFL merger talks ====
On March 10, 2021, it was announced that the XFL and CFL had entered into formal talks ahead of "opportunities for the leagues to collaborate, innovate, and grow the game of football". According to XFL President & CEO Jeffrey Pollack, the league had decided to hit the pause button on their planned 2022 season, so they could focus on talks with the CFL. Both sides have declined to rule out any particular outcome from their talks which could have theoretically included a merger or acquisition. On July 7, 2021, both leagues ended the discussions with no agreement; in the same statement, the XFL cancelled its 2022 season, intending to return in "Spring 2023".

On October 14, 2021, it was revealed that the XFL and Jeffrey Pollack had parted ways, leaving the role as president vacant. On November 8, 2021, in its first substantial public actions since its sale, the league announced the hiring of an executive team; five of the nine hires, including Doug Whaley, returned from the McMahon era. The league named NFL Network Analyst Marc Ross as its new EVP, as well as Russ Brandon, under whom Whaley had worked in the Buffalo Bills organization, as its new president, replacing the outgoing Pollack. On December 21, 2021, the XFL announced six new additions to the football operations department; two of the six hires returned from the McMahon era.

==== 2023 season ====
On December 2, 2021, it was revealed on Dany Garcia's Instagram page that the 2023 XFL Season would start on February 18, 2023. It was later revealed on January 4, 2022, on Dwayne Johnson's and Dany Garcia's social media pages that training camp was set to begin on January 4, 2023.

On March 11, 2022, multiple news reports indicated that the XFL had hired Reggie Barlow away from the Virginia State Trojans to serve as a head coach. Virginia State confirmed Barlow had taken a job with the XFL. On April 6, 2022, multiple news reports indicated that the XFL had hired their second head coach in former NFL defensive back Terrell Buckley. The reports indicated Buckley would coach a team in Orlando, Florida; Orlando was not among the eight cities that hosted an XFL team in 2020 but had begun discussions with the XFL during the 2020 season about relocating the Tampa Bay Vipers there. Orlando had hosted the Orlando Apollos, the second top-attended team in the Alliance of American Football in 2019 and the Orlando Rage, one of the most successful teams in the original XFL in 2001.

On April 6, 2022, a report came out that sources close to the league had mentioned that XFL would be keeping five teams in their original 2020 locations (DC Defenders, St. Louis Battlehawks, Dallas Renegades, Houston Roughnecks and Seattle Dragons), following through with the Vipers proposed move to Orlando, and adding two new teams in San Antonio and Las Vegas. The teams in San Antonio and Las Vegas would replace the New York Guardians and the Los Angeles Wildcats, respectively. According to the same report, the league was looking to re-hire Renegades head coach Bob Stoops and potentially bring back former Vipers head coach Marc Trestman in another capacity, while noting that in regard to coaches, "the situation (was) fluid" at the time and that several other former NFL players were being considered for coaching positions. Seattle and St. Louis, the XFL's two highest-attended teams in 2020, were long expected to return.

On April 6, 2022, the XFL announced a new brand identity from a partnership with R/GA, including streamlining its logo to distance itself from the original XFL even more; the X in the logo represents the "intersection of dreams and opportunity". Togethxr, a media and commerce company founded by athletes Alex Morgan, Sue Bird, Chloe Kim, and Simone Manuel, issued a legal notice to the XFL over similarities between Togethxr's logo and a promotional image that the XFL produced with the word "together" between a vertically split letter X. Both Togethxr's company name and the word "together" in the XFL image are rendered in all caps.

On April 13, 2022, the XFL confirmed the hirings of Stoops, Buckley and Barlow, along with the league's five other head coaches, without identifying which teams they would coach. The other head coaches hired were Wade Phillips, Rod Woodson, Anthony Becht, Jim Haslett and Hines Ward.

On May 17, 2022, the official kickoff date for the 2023 season was announced to be on February 18. It was also announced that all XFL games would be broadcast on ABC as well as the networks of ESPN, ESPN2 and FX as part of a deal with The Walt Disney Company that lasts until 2027.

On May 18, 2022, two separate reports indicated that The Dome at America's Center had left 5 open dates anticipating the BattleHawks' return, and that TDECU Stadium would host XFL games in 2023.

On June 9, 2022, directors of player personnel and offensive and defensive coordinators were announced. Among the announcements was the confirmation of June Jones joining Haslett's staff, as well as Gregg Williams on Barlow's staff.

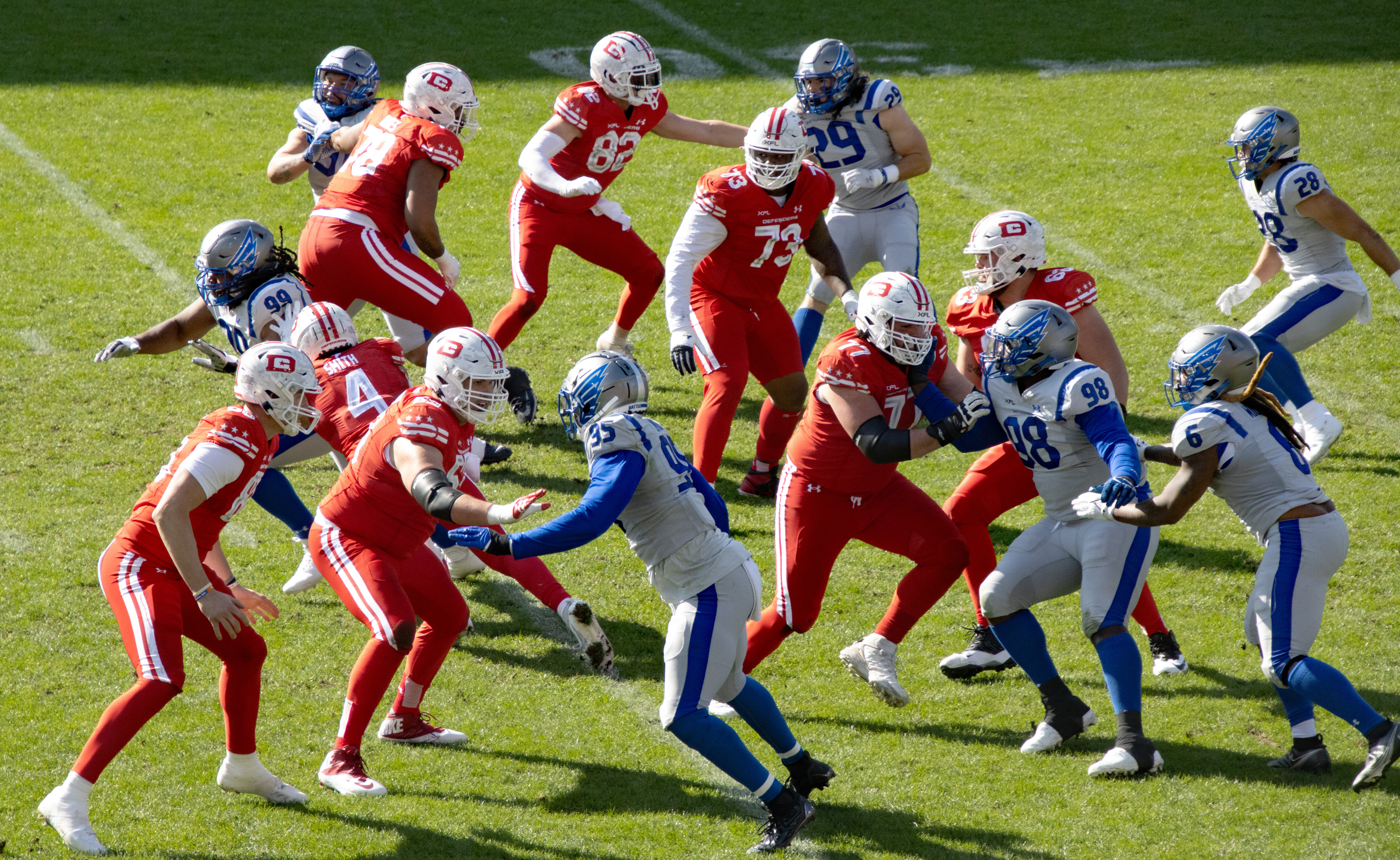
A game between the DC Defenders and St. Louis BattleHawks in 2023

On July 18, 2022, Kevin Seifert announced that cities and stadiums, which would largely be on the same scale as college, NFL, and Major League Soccer (MLS) venues the league had used in 2020, would be announced by the end of July, and implied that teams that did not have trademark disputes and were returning from their home cities would retain their 2020 brands.

On July 25, 2022, Johnson and Garcia held an XFL Townhall at Texas Live! where they confirmed team locations, venues, and staff allocation. All 2020 XFL teams except the Los Angeles Wildcats would return. They would be replaced by a team in San Antonio, with the Tampa Bay Vipers and New York Guardians relocating to Las Vegas and Orlando respectively.

On August 8, 2022, it was first reported that the XFL was looking for new equity investors in the league. The league had retained PJT Partners to help with the search and raise $125 million in equity funding, while new investors could own up to 35%-45% of the XFL.

Forbes reported in June 2023 that the XFL had spent approximately $140 million in expenses over the course of the 2023 season and earned $80 million in gross revenue, roughly $20 million of which came from its broadcast contract with ESPN. The league estimated an increase in revenue to $100 million for the 2024 season and profitability by 2026. Johnson confirmed that ESPN had become a "stakeholder" in the league after sports journalist Andrew Marchand claimed the XFL was not receiving a rights fee, which Johnson stated was "not true." The XFL also revealed they have capital commitments through Year 4, including ESPN's annual rights payment and sponsorship deals with Progressive Corporation and Under Armour.

=== XFL–USFL merger ===
On March 27, 2023, Garcia said in a USA Today interview that XFL started planning for the 2024 season and declared: "absolutely, there will be a 2024 XFL football season."

In May 2023, the XFL made league-wide cuts affecting up to 30 people, including key personnel CMO Janet Duch and VP of Marketing Anthony Zucconi. The league would later state it was part of a restructuring strategy "to transition into a dual full-time and seasonal-based employment model to improve efficiency and drive sustainable business performance across all markets, given the seasonal nature of the business". In July 2023, league President Russ Brandon also assumed the role of CEO of the organization.

In September 2023, Axios reported that the XFL was in advanced talks with the USFL to merge the two leagues prior to the start of their 2024 seasons. On September 28, 2023, the XFL and USFL announced their intent to merge with details surrounding the merger to be announced at a later date. The merger would also require regulatory approval. In October 2023 the XFL filed a trademark application for the name "United Football League". On November 30, 2023, Garcia announced via her Instagram page that the leagues had received regulatory approval for the merger and were finalizing plans for a "combined season" to begin March 30, 2024. The merger was formally announced on Fox NFL Sunday on December 31, 2023, with both leagues cancelling their planned season while surviving teams will play the 2024 season in the newly formed United Football League.

== Teams ==
On July 25, 2022, Johnson and Garcia held a XFL Townhall at Texas Live! in Arlington where they confirmed all 2020 XFL markets except Los Angeles, Tampa Bay, and New York would return. Los Angeles, Tampa Bay, and New York would be replaced by teams in San Antonio, Las Vegas, and Orlando respectively.

Club	City/State	Stadium	Surface	Capacity†	1st season	Head coach	Ultimate Fate
North Division
DC Defenders	Washington, D.C.	Audi Field	Grass	20,000	2020	Reggie Barlow	Joined UFL
Seattle Sea Dragons	Seattle, Washington	Lumen Field	Turf	68,740†	2020	Jim Haslett	Suspended, on retainer
St. Louis BattleHawks	St. Louis, Missouri	The Dome at America's Center	Turf	67,277†	2020	Anthony Becht	Joined UFL
Vegas Vipers	Las Vegas, Nevada	Cashman Field	Grass	12,500	2020	Anthony Blevins	Folded
South Division
Arlington Renegades	Arlington, Texas	Choctaw Stadium	Grass	25,000	2020	Bob Stoops	Joined UFL
Houston Roughnecks	Houston, Texas	TDECU Stadium	Turf	40,000†	2020	Wade Phillips	Branding transferred
Orlando Guardians	Orlando, Florida	Camping World Stadium	Turf	60,219†	2020	Terrell Buckley	Folded, replaced by Orlando Storm in 2026
San Antonio Brahmas	San Antonio, Texas	Alamodome	Turf	64,000†	2023	Hines Ward	Joined UFL, Folded in 2025

Defunct franchises
Club	City/State	Stadium	Surface	Only season	Head coach
Los Angeles Wildcats	Carson, California	Dignity Health Sports Park	Grass	2020	Winston Moss
Team 9 (Note: Team 9 was a specialized team acting as a hybrid farm team and practice squad for the league, and was inspired by a similar scheme employed by NFL Europe. It held a maximum of 40 players at a time and was meant to prepare players for calling up to one of the XFL's 8 teams to fill roster vacancies due to injuries of other players or if the teams see a player as a "hidden gem". The team shared practice facilities and support staff with the Dallas Renegades but maintained its own coaching staff; its head coach was Bart Andrus.)	Arlington, Texas	Globe Life Park in Arlington	Grass	2020	Bart Andrus

†Full stadium capacity. The large stadiums with multiple decks only open the lower bowl for XFL games, similar to the former AAF games and MLS matches played in large stadiums. The XFL has a target stadium size of 30,000 seats so that in the event of playoff games, the upper decks can be opened to increase capacity.

Locations of current & former teams for the 2024 XFL season, (South Division – red; North Division – blue; Former – black)

=== Timeline ===
" * " indicates Championship Season
Deactivated Teams in grey

== Rule changes ==
The XFL ran test games with community colleges in Mississippi, Your Call Football, and The Spring League during their spring 2019 seasons, to experiment with rule changes. It hired Dean Blandino as its head of officiating. On December 7, 2022, the league confirmed it would be keeping the rulebook used in 2020.

=== Kickoffs ===
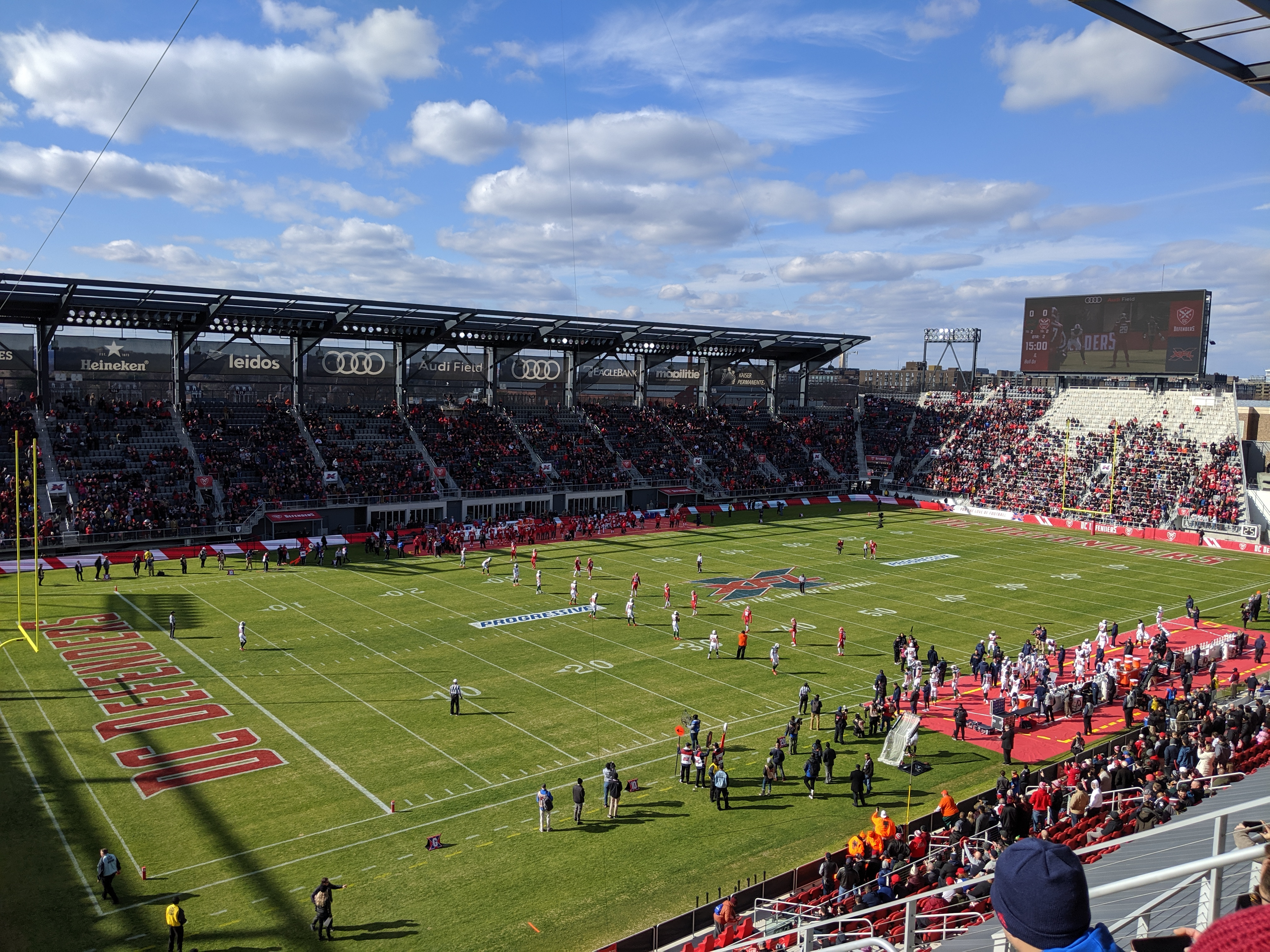
First ever XFL kickoff between the DC Defenders and Seattle Dragons at Audi Field.

The league has an active interest in reviving the kickoffs as an element of the game, in contrast to the former AAF, which eliminated kickoffs outright, and the NFL and college football, both of which imposed rules minimizing the impact of the kickoff in the mid-2010s to improve player safety. Many of these kickoff rules were adapted from rules created by The Spring League's predecessor, the Fall Experimental Football League:

- The spot of the kickoff is set at the kicking team's 30-yard line. (The NFL used the 30-yard line as its standard from 1994 to 2010; the current NFL and college standard is the 35-yard line.) However, members of the kicking team (excluding the kicker) line up at the receiving team's 35-yard line and blockers on the receiving team must line up at their 30-yard line. Only the kicker and returner(s) can move until the ball is either caught or three seconds after it hits the ground.
- Kickoffs that go out of bounds, or fall short of the receiving team's 20-yard line, come to the kicking team's 45-yard line. (The NFL and NCAA only require a kick travel 10 yards; kicks out of bounds are placed at the receiving team's 40-yard line.)
- The XFL uses two different types of touchbacks. A major touchback occurs when a kick travels into the end zone in the air, which results in the receiving team taking possession at the 35. A minor touchback occurs when the ball bounces into the end zone, which results in the receiving team taking possession at the 15. These rules discourage either team from purposefully taking a touchback.
- Teams can request to attempt an onside kick under more conventional kickoff rules. If a team opts for an onside kick, the ball must travel at least ten yards before it can be recovered by the kicking team (as with other leagues) but may not travel more than 20 yards downfield in the air from the spot of the kick, to prevent the formation from being used as a loophole. Beginning in 2023, a team that scores in the fourth quarter has the option of taking the "Fourth and 15" option in lieu of a kickoff, retaining the ball on their own 25-yard line and having one opportunity to reach their 40 and get a new first down.

=== Punts ===
- The XFL does not allow gunners; all players on a punting team must remain on or behind the line of scrimmage until the ball is kicked. (This is a carryover from the original XFL, although that league had scrapped the rule midway through its only season.)
- The coffin corner punt is treated as a touchback and brought to the 35-yard line. The attempts to neutralize punt coverage are made to encourage more fourth-down conversions; Luck conceded halfway through the inaugural season that the effort was largely unsuccessful, as coaches continued to punt as usual.
- The same touchback rules for kickoffs also apply to punts.

=== Points after touchdown ===
The conventional extra point kick was replaced with a scrimmage play, varying in point value depending on how far the touchdown-scoring team chooses to take the snap from the goal line: a two-yard attempt scores a single point, a five-yard attempt two points, and a ten-yard attempt three points. (This rule is also a carryover from the original XFL, which added the rule only for the playoffs. The Stars Football League also used the rule during its existence.) In the event the defense secures a turnover and returns the ball for a touchdown, the defensive team scores the same number of points as the offense was aiming to score. In the event of a defensive penalty during the conversion attempt, the defense is penalized half the distance to the goal but the value of the attempt remains the same as it was prior to the penalty being enforced.

=== Double-forward pass ===
Teams can attempt two forward passes on the same play, so long as the ball never crosses the line of scrimmage before the second pass. This also means that if a pass is batted back towards the quarterback, he is eligible to throw it again; Landry Jones of Dallas successfully utilized this rule in a game.

=== Fumbles into the defensive end zone ===
Beginning in 2023, if an offensive player fumbles the ball from outside the end zone and it goes through the end zone without being recovered, the offense retains possession at the point of the fumble (if the fumble occurred on fourth down, final possession is determined by whether the ball carrier reached the line to gain before the fumble), consistent with the rule for other forward fumbles. At most other levels (except the USFL, which adopted the same rule at the same time), the team on offense loses possession of the ball and the opponent is awarded possession at its own 20-yard line.

=== Overtime ===
Overtime is decided by a three-round shootout of two-point conversions similar to a penalty shootout in soccer or ice hockey. Such a shootout had never been attempted in organized football at the time the rule was proposed; in April 2019, the NCAA adopted a similar concept for games that reach a fifth overtime starting with the 2019 FBS season. Unlike other football leagues, a coin toss is not used to determine who is on offense first; instead, the visiting team is on offense first and home team on defense first for each round, similar to baseball. The defense is not able to score, as should a turnover occur, the play would be dead. Defensive penalties result in the ball moving up to the 1-yard line, while any subsequent defensive penalty on any play, even in future rounds, result in a score awarded to the offensive team. Pre-snap offensive penalties result in the ball being respotted under regular rules, while post-snap offensive penalties result in a loss of down and no score. If both teams remain tied after three rounds, multiple rounds of conversions will be played until one team succeeds, thus ensuring that no game can end in a draw. The overtime procedure was originally to be five rounds in 2020 had it been needed (none of the 20 games that season ended regulation with both teams tied) before it was reduced to three rounds prior to 2023.

=== Clock changes ===
- Outside of the two-minute warning, the clock runs continuously. During this time, the clock only stops during a change of possession. This reverses after the two-minute warning (which the XFL uses), after which the clock stops after all plays from scrimmage until the ball is spotted and reverts to NFL timing rules otherwise, stopping after incomplete passes, advancing the ball out of bounds and spiking the football. (Arena football has long used a continuous clock with even fewer stoppages; Canadian football does not use a continuous clock but stops the clock after all plays from scrimmage following that code's three-minute warning.)
- As of 2023, the play clock is 35 seconds from the end of the previous play, same as the 2001 XFL and AAF. In 2020, the XFL play clock ran 25 seconds long measured from the spotting of the ball, roughly the same as the NCAA rule for plays when the clock is stopped. (This is five seconds longer than the CFL rule, which is 20 seconds from the spotting of the ball. The XFL's efforts to speed up spotting were aimed to make the two lengths of time nearly the same, 30 to 32 seconds overall.) The NFL standard is 40 seconds from the end of the previous play, also used during the NCAA during plays when the clock is running. In conjunction with this rule, the XFL has a one-way radio in all offensive players' helmets to allow the offensive coordinator to run a no-huddle offense and call plays directly to all of the players from the sidelines. This eliminates the need for a huddle.
- Instant replay reviews are limited to 60 seconds. In 2020, there were no coach's challenges; the sky judge originated all reviews automatically. In 2023, as an experiment, the league allowed a single coach's challenge for each team, which can challenge any ruling or penalty, including those that cannot be challenged in college or other professional leagues. They risk losing a timeout if the call stands; they get an extra challenge if call is reversed.

=== Officiating changes ===
- The XFL expands on the NCAA system of eight on-field officials (which includes the center judge not used professionally in either the NFL or CFL) including a ninth official, a specialized "ball judge" whose only duty is to quickly spot the ball after the end of the previous play. By utilizing the ball judge, who wears a red hat to differentiate themself from the other officials, the league aims to have a ball-spotting time of between five and seven seconds.
- A new rule proposal would add a "tap penalty", imposed on individual players instead of entire teams. Players who commit a foul which is not serious enough to warrant a penalty flag will be sent off the field for one play. This type of enforcement will keep the game moving quickly without allowing players to break the rules. Unlike the almost analogous power play used in ice hockey, the offending team would be allowed to substitute another player.
- The defunct Alliance of American Football introduced the sky judge, an additional official in the press booth for the sole purpose of reviewing on-field decisions. Luck had said he thought this was a great innovation to the game and, in December 2019, confirmed the XFL would use the sky judge. Robert Lu, who served as the AAF's sky judge in 2019, continues in that capacity with the new UFL.
- Penalty enforcement placed priority on fouls that pose a threat to player safety, with less emphasis on procedural violations so as not to slow down the game with unnecessary penalty calls. Officials also had access to both teams' play calls. The sky judge had full access to the officials' microphones.
- All six of the XFL's officiating crews had at least one woman.
- The league used Lazser Down chain crew equipment which uses radio waves to precisely measure the spotting of the ball.

=== Ball ===
The football used in XFL games is the traditional brown color used in most other leagues, in contrast to the 2001 XFL's black and red ball. Each team has its own balls for use in home games, marked with the XFL and home team logo. For the 2020 XFL season, a two-tone "X" in the home team's colors adorned each point and runs through the middle of each panel of the ball, intended to allow the receivers to track the ball easily in lieu of striping. Five balls, each with a different texture of leather, were tested during the Summer Showcases and The Spring League. The winning texture, a custom patent-pending design known as "X-Pebble", was released November 25, 2019. The design was created and is manufactured by Team Issue of Dallas, Texas, in what became their first professional football contract.

The XFL announced in November 2022 that it would no longer use the "X-Pebble" ball, and debuted a new official league ball, which uses the Horween leather used in other professional leagues and features the signature of Dany Garcia, XFL Chairwoman. The ball continues to be manufactured in Dallas.

=== Miscellaneous ===
The league used the amateur football (high school and college) and CFL standard of one foot in bounds for a complete forward pass.

- Offensive linemen are allowed to advance up to two yards downfield on a forward pass.
- At the start of the game, the designated home team automatically got to choose to kick off, receive, or defer to the second half. There was no coin toss traditionally seen in other football leagues, or any opening scramble that was a hallmark of the original XFL. In the event of overtime, the visiting team was given the choice of going first or second or selecting which end zone to attack (with the home team getting the other choice).
- Players were allowed to wear colored or decorated visors.
- There was a 10-minute halftime. Only the Championship Game had a 30-minute halftime.

=== Proposed ===
These were rule changes which the league had considered using, though they were either not officially tested or were discarded in preseason testing:

- Previous proposals for the kickoff had the ball moved as far back as the 15-yard line, to make touchbacks nearly impossible. A similar rule is used in the UFL, which carried over from the USFL; in those leagues, the kickoff was from the 20-yard line.
- The original proposal for the multiple forward pass rule would have treated any pass behind the line of scrimmage as a lateral pass. Luck stated that this would also have the added benefit of simplifying officiating, as he surmised it would be easier to judge whether a person was behind a fixed line of scrimmage compared to whether a pass thrown by a moving player was traveling along a parallel line. The XFL ran test plays with double forward passes during its rules testing in Mississippi. Under this rule, all players behind the line of scrimmage would have been eligible receivers, including those on the offensive line, and thus it would eliminate the "illegal touching of a forward pass" penalty at other levels of the game. Offensive linemen would still have been prohibited from advancing downfield before a forward pass that crosses the line of scrimmage is in the air. (McMahon had proposed a similar but broader rule change during the run of the original XFL, which would have made all players eligible receivers, but the league's coaches rejected the proposal as too radical of a change to make mid-season.) It also would have had the intended consequence of employing utility players who play multiple positions and have a broader range of skills. In November 2019, an ESPN.com article noted that the rule had been thrown out before the season began, and that offensive linemen would still not be allowed to touch forward passes, regardless of where the ball was.
- The league proposed using a wider one-yard neutral zone used by the CFL. (The NFL, college, and high school standard is the length of the football, approximately 11 inches.) This rule became less likely after testing, as the league feared it would make short-yardage situations too easy to convert for the offensive team.
- The original XFL allowed for forward motion by a single backfield player (normally, American football allows for only lateral or backward motion by one backfielder, and the CFL allows all backfielders to move wherever they desire). The XFL had briefly mentioned they might use this rule again.
- During the announcement of the league, McMahon suggested the XFL may eliminate halftime completely. This was eventually abandoned, and instead, there is, as mentioned in the rules above, a ten-minute halftime period.
- A proposed rule used in the earliest preseason tests would have prohibited offensive linemen (excluding the snapper) from putting their hand on the ground, outlawing the three-point stance used at all other levels of the game.
- The XFL had announced that there would be no fair catches and that a five-yard halo rule would instead be used; both of these rules are used in the CFL and were prominent rules in the original XFL. The XFL legalized the fair catch in the official rulebook while noting that the other rule changes were intended to make its use uncommon. The league did allow the use of a fair catch kick.

== Draft ==
=== 2020 ===
The 2020 XFL Draft was held October 15 and 16, 2019, via conference call. Seventy-one players were allocated to each team in separate position drafts: one marquee quarterback allocated by the league to each team, ten skill positions, ten offensive linemen, ten defensive linemen and/or linebackers, ten defensive backs, and thirty players of any position. Due to the structure of the draft, there was no true first overall selection. A supplemental draft was held in late November.

=== 2023 ===
The XFL 2023 draft took place at the UFC Apex in Enterprise, Nevada, while the player pool consisted of 1,700 eligible players, after XFL personnel have evaluated nearly 6,000 players in seven XFL showcases, NFL training camps and tryouts. Of those, 528 players advanced to the preseason rosters.

The 2023 XFL Draft followed the same basic layout as the 2020 XFL draft: starting quarterbacks were allocated in a separate process and revealed November 15, while the remaining positions were separated by position. It followed a "snake" format, with each position phase following a random order set prior to the draft, and that order reversing between odd and even rounds of the phase.

=== 2023 offseason (pre-merger) ===
In an interview after the 2023 season, XFL's Senior Vice President of Player Personnel Doug Whaley disclosed that the league planned a "rookie" draft scheduled for June 16, 2023, and would conduct "multiple drafts" in the fall of 2023.

== Season structure ==
The XFL has a 10-week regular season, with each team hosting 5 home games, and no bye week. This is followed by a two-week post-season, featuring the top two teams in each division competing in a single-elimination bracket. The league is split into two divisions of four teams. Each team plays all three teams in their division twice, once each of home and road. Each team also plays the remaining teams in the league once. This is the same schedule model used by the original XFL and by the former AAF. Both leagues followed an Eastern/Western division, which the XFL also confirmed during its Summer Showcase in Dallas. The XFL East includes New York, DC, Tampa, and St. Louis while the West includes Seattle, Los Angeles, Dallas, and Houston.

Four games are played per week during the regular season, consisting mainly of afternoon/primetime doubleheaders played on Saturdays and Sundays. One game per week in the final two weeks of the regular season is tentatively scheduled to be played on Thursday night instead of Saturday. The playoffs, despite initial reports stating they would use the same crossover approach used by the 2001 XFL, with each division's regular-season winner facing the other division's runner-up, instead use a division championship model, with the top two teams in the division playing each other. The 2020 XFL Championship Game was scheduled to be played at TDECU Stadium in Houston.

== Players ==
Each XFL team in 2020 had 52 players regular-season roster, far more than the 38 in the original XFL and comparable to the size of the 53-man NFL rosters; 46 of those 52 are active on any given game day. The league carried 51 players, with 46 active on game day in 2023.

XFL did not have the same eligibility requirements for players as the NFL. Currently the NFL requires all players to be at least 3 years removed from high school to be eligible for a team's roster. Almost all prospects then participate in NCAA football for the 3-year waiting period. This eligibility requirement is an agreement between the NCAA and the NFL. The NFL, in exchange for not signing young players who would ordinarily play in the NCAA, is allowed nearly unlimited access to scout and recruit college players. With the XFL not using the same set of requirements for players, there was the possibility the league would sign players who are less than 3 years out of high school. The XFL also did not rule out signing players who play college football when it was first announced in 2019, something the NFL has not done since 1925, which (former commissioner) Luck said was to be considered on a case-by-case basis; In the league's inaugural season, safety Kenny Robinson, who had run into eligibility issues that led to him being expelled from college, chose to play in the XFL instead of transferring to another college; Robinson was a success in the XFL and was ultimately selected in the 2020 NFL Draft.

In 2020 the league's primary target for players was veteran backups (such as the kind Luck developed in his time in NFL Europe, citing Kurt Warner, Brad Johnson and Jake Delhomme as examples) who may not be getting the repetitions needed to develop properly on NFL scout teams and practice squads. Due to budget concerns and an unwillingness to antagonize the NFL, it did not get into bidding wars for marquee players, but didn't intend to be just a "developmental" league to the NFL, rather a "'standalone' and 'complement' league". In contrast, the 2023 season of the XFL saw the league take a much lower emphasis on professional experience when selecting its quarterbacks, as it noted that the veterans "washed out early" compared to the younger, less experienced talent and that its 2020 breakout star—P. J. Walker—was better known at the time for bouncing on and off the Indianapolis Colts practice squad before joining the XFL and ultimately landing the starting position with the Carolina Panthers. The new ownership also embraced more of a "developmental" mentality when they signed a collaboration agreement with the NFL and introduced the "54th man" slogan, which refer to the NFL 53-men roster limit.

The XFL did not employ separate general managers for each team; instead, each team's head coach doubled as his team's respective general manager. Each team had a team president. The league did not use a territorial draft and teams were not restricted to the locations from which they could select players; this differs from the Alliance of American Football and other alternative football leagues.

=== Current NFL players ===
- Chris Blair
- Elijah Campbell
- Scott Daly
- Lukas Denis
- Ben DiNucci
- Michael Dunn
- Austin Faoliu
- DeMarquis Gates
- Jack Heflin
- Taylor Heinicke
- Godwin Igwebuike
- Lucky Jackson
- Tyree Jackson
- Josh Johnson
- Jaryd Jones-Smith
- Christian Kuntz
- Niko Lalos
- LaCale London
- Nick Moore
- A. J. McCarron
- Storm Norton
- Donald Parham
- P. J. Walker
- Austin Walter
- Barry Wesley
- Daniel Whelan

=== Notable players ===
- Geronimo Allison
- Kalen Ballage
- Vic Beasley
- Martavis Bryant
- Antonio Callaway
- Connor Cook
- Sean Davis
- Lance Dunbar
- Kony Ealy
- Matt Elam
- Josh Gordon
- Brett Hundley
- Steven Johnson
- Cardale Jones
- Landry Jones
- Matt Jones
- Marquette King
- Cody Latimer
- Cre'Von LeBlanc
- Phillip Lindsay
- Paxton Lynch
- A. J. McCarron
- Matt McGloin
- Christine Michael
- Rahim Moore
- Aaron Murray
- Eli Rogers
- D. J. Swearinger

=== Compensation ===
==== 2020 season ====
In 2020, the XFL used a standard form contract paying $2,725 per week for each player on the active roster, $1,040 of which is guaranteed. A $2,222 victory bonus is paid to the players on each game's winning team; this feature is a carryover from the original XFL. The contracts expire at the end of the season, freeing players to sign with any other league. Players are also paid $1,040 per week during the preseason and through the playoffs if their team does not qualify. Starting quarterbacks make an annual salary of up to $495,000, with the average XFL quarterback earning $125,000.

Plans were for the league to offer contracts between one and three years in length. Signing for a longer term would make the player eligible for a loyalty bonus above and beyond their tiered salary; in return, the player would not be allowed to play in any other league during the spring, summer, or autumn months, nor was the contract guaranteed. The overall salary cap was approximately $4,000,000 per team. The XFL chose a more flexible salary structure so as not to overpay for the lower ends of the roster and to be more competitive for better starting quarterbacks.

Head coaches were eligible for up to a $500,000 salary, with each team having a football operations staff of 25 people. In contrast to the original XFL, players' health insurance is covered by the league. Players did not form a labor union by the time play commenced, thus league policies are not subject to collective bargaining, which could have helped prevent work stoppages like a lockout or strike.

==== 2023 season ====
In 2023, the XFL used a standard form contract paying $800 per week in training camp, $1,500 per game week where the player is inactive, and $5,000 per game week where the player is active. A $1,000 victory bonus is paid to the players on each game's winning team, including inactive players. The active roster is 51, with 45 being active on game day. Starting quarterbacks were again eligible for a higher salary, which was yet to be determined as of July 2022; the highest paid quarterback in the league for 2023 was reputed to be Vegas Vipers quarterback Brett Hundley, who was paid $200,000 for his time with the Vipers, while AJ McCarron and Jordan Ta'amu both made over $100,000. The average annual salary for a season long active XFL player was thus $59,000, plus free health insurance including vision and dental, as well as room and board in the league's hub at Arlington, Texas throughout the season, valued at approximately $20,000. Players also won $8,000 for winning their conference championship and $12,500 for winning the league championship.

On March 10, 2023, the United Steelworkers announced that it had received a petition from players in the XFL for a vote on unionizing the league's players. The USW has an affiliation with the United Football Players Association, whose founder Kenneth Farrow II plays for the Arlington Renegades. On April 19, the XFL players decided against joining the union by vote of 124 to 73.

==== 2024 planned season ====
After the 2023 season concluded, Doug Whaley, XFL's Senior Vice President of Player Personnel, said in an interview that the league delaying contracts for 2024 season due to a potential unionization of players from "another entity" (not the USW), later revealed to be the National Football League Players Association. Russ Giglio, Senior Director, Player Administration and Officiating Operations, also mentioned that 2023 season players has a mutual 'opt-in' agreement: "The players that finish the season have a mutual option with the team to sign back. The team wants the player back, the player wants to come back, we’ll sign a contract". On December 29, 2023, XFL players were notified by Whaley that their current contracts and health benefits would expire on December 31, 2023.

== Partnerships ==
=== 2020 season ===
The XFL ran test games with community colleges in Mississippi, Your Call Football (YCF), and The Spring League (TSL) during their spring 2019 seasons, to experiment with rule changes. The XFL even had a preliminary discussion with TSL about their league becoming an "Official 'D-League' of the XFL".

In 2019, Stephen Austin's American National Combines conducted the league's "Summer Showcase combines". Austin directed eight Showcases in each of the league's eight team locations in June and the second week of July 2019.

=== 2023 season ===
Under McMahon's ownership, the XFL explicitly avoided any minor league developmental partnership with the NFL or any other league, so as not to lose control of its personnel decisions. This policy changed in 2022 when the XFL signed a collaboration agreement with the NFL to "experiment with proposed rules, test new equipment and develop prospective officials and coaches and explore new ways to address player safety". Johnson also said that "the XFL specifically designed its schedule to give its players the best chance of latching on with an NFL team in May", while Cardinal stated that "the minor league analogy is valid, that's an important part of this."

The league had a player personnel partnership with the Indoor Football League, with the IFL functioning as its de facto minor league, while it also has a partnership with the NFL Alumni Academy to develop potential players which state that every player graduated from the program has an "opt-in" option for XFL contract. In an interview after the 2023 season Senior Vice President of Player Personnel, Doug Whaley, said the XFL don't know if the partnership with the NFLAA will continue: "We haven’t heard if they’re going to do it again. So we’re waiting to see what they said".

The XFL used American National Combines (ANC) for "supplemental showcase" for players on the "XFL waitlist" for the 2023 season. On March 20, 2023, the league announced it has named ANC as the "official regional combines partner", with the ANC running a year-round scouting event, allowing the XFL to "identify more high-quality and talented players".

The XFL also had a partnership agreement with the Under the Lights Flag Football, an international youth flag football league for boys and girls from kindergarten through 12th grade. The two entities also co-hosted the first-ever Youth Flag Football World Championship in San Antonio, Texas on December 27–30, 2022.

== Records ==
All-time XFL leaders
Leader	Team	Player	Record	Years in XFL
Passing yards	Seattle Sea Dragons	Ben DiNucci	2,671 passing yards	2023
Passing Touchdowns	St. Louis Battlehawks	A. J. McCarron	24 passing touchdowns	2023
Rushing yards	DC Defenders	Abram Smith	791 rushing yards	2023
Rushing Touchdowns	DC Defenders; Arlington Renegades	Abram Smith; De'Veon Smith	7 rushing touchdowns	2023
Receiving Yards	Seattle Sea Dragons	Jahcour Pearson	670 receiving yards	2023
Receiving Touchdowns	Houston Roughnecks	Cam Phillips	9 receiving touchdowns	2020
Receptions	Seattle Sea Dragons	Jahcour Pearson	60 receptions	2023
Tackles	San Antonio Brahmas	Jordan Williams	51 tackles	2023
Sacks	Houston Roughnecks	Trent Harris	9.5 sacks	2023
Interceptions	Houston Roughnecks	Ajene Harris	5 interceptions	2020–2023
Coaching wins	DC Defenders	Reggie Barlow	9 wins	2023

XFL attendance records
Year	Week	Team	Attendance
2023	4	St. Louis Battlehawks	38,310
2023	5	St. Louis Battlehawks	35,868
2023	8	St. Louis Battlehawks	35,167
2023	9	St. Louis Battlehawks	33,142
2023	10	St. Louis Battlehawks	33,034
2020	3	St. Louis Battlehawks	29,554
2020	2	Seattle Dragons	29,172
2020	4	St. Louis Battlehawks	27,527
2023	1	San Antonio Brahmas	24,245
2023	Championship	XFL Championship in San Antonio	22,754

== Gambling ==
In February 2020, the XFL announced that DraftKings would be the official daily fantasy sports provider of the league and an "authorized gaming operator". McMahon has a minority investment in the company.

Luck stated he anticipated mobile sports betting to be legal in many states by the 2020 launch date, much like it is in New Jersey, and hoped to integrate legal sports betting as part of the XFL. Every state hosting an XFL team, except Florida (which has an existing law banning sports betting), and California (which had a pending voter referendum on sports betting) had either introduced or passed legislation for the legalization of sports betting. In December 2019, Luck stated he was cooperating with the Las Vegas sportsbooks in providing official information for betting purposes.

Both of the XFL's main broadcast partners in 2020 had official partnerships with gambling operators, with ESPN partnered with Caesars Entertainment to use its sportsbook information during telecasts (including displaying lines and the over/under directly on the score bug in-game—a feature that ESPN retained as sole rightsholder in the 2023 season), and Fox being a partner with Flutter Entertainment on Fox Bet. The league also announced a partnership with Genius Sports on an integrity program to "protect the league from illegal activity". The agreement includes monitoring of all pre-game and live betting markets, including alerts and analysis of odds movements.

The XFL also has an in-house gaming app service called PlayXFL where fans can win cash prizes for correctly predicting the exact score of select XFL games each week. Additionally, fans attending an XFL game can opt-in to play a 4-Question Pick'em contest about the game they are attending for the chance to win prizes, including merchandise and tickets, from the applicable home team.

== Broadcasting ==
In January 2019, Sports Business Journal reported that the XFL was desiring that the majority of games air on broadcast television and was in preliminary talks with ABC/ESPN and Fox Sports as potential broadcast partners. The XFL confirmed these arrangements on May 6, 2019, under a three-year deal. XFL games were split primarily among ABC, Fox, ESPN, and FS1. ESPN would broadcast the western division championship and the XFL championship, while one game each was scheduled for ESPN2 and FS2.

The Wall Street Journal reported via inside sources that neither the broadcasters or the league in 2020 made any upfront payments, but that the XFL sold the in-game sponsorship inventory. The networks covered the production costs, held the digital rights to their telecasts, and the right to sell the conventional commercial inventory during their games. Although the networks had ultimate control over the game presentation, McMahon and his longtime media man Joe Cohen brought back many of the features from the original XFL such as the skycam and the on-field "Bubba Cams", along with some innovations introduced in the AAF. The broadcast partners are given access to all on-field microphones, including the coach-to-player radios, referees and the sky judge. As with the original XFL, sideline reporters are given full access to coaches and players for interviews at all times. In terms of financial investment into the telecast, ESPN lead play-by-play man Steve Levy described it as "not getting the Monday Night Football treatment (...) but it's pretty close." (Levy would later become the lead Monday Night Football play-by-play announcer for the NFL's 2020 season, but was later replaced in 2022 by former Fox voice Joe Buck).

Upon the announcement of the new XFL, McMahon stated that he aimed to leverage streaming media as part of broadcasting arrangements and argued that fans wanted "totally different ways" to see the game, rather than having digital streams be only a straight simulcast of the television broadcast. The XFL would not consider viewership to be a metric of its success; McMahon argued that "to me the landscape has changed in so many different ways. Just look at technology and companies like Facebook and Amazon bidding for sports rights. Even if ratings go down, there's no denying that live sports rights continue to be valuable and continue to deliver." Luck stated that broadcasts would not feature the same sports entertainment gimmicks as the original XFL, explaining that "in football, you don't need that bravado and swagger and flair, because it's always there."

Curt Menefee (host of Fox NFL Sunday) and Joel Klatt (lead analyst for Fox's Big Noon Saturday) served as Fox's lead XFL broadcast team in 2020. Fox also auditioned Greg Olsen for the second XFL broadcast team in October 2019 by having him call an NFL game during his bye week from the Carolina Panthers and eventually hired him as color commentator for the second broadcast team, which features Kevin Burkhardt on play-by-play. Brock Huard was the sideline reporter for Fox's lead broadcast while Jenny Taft covered the sidelines for their second broadcast team. In week 5, New Orleans Saints star Cameron Jordan served as a guest sideline reporter for Fox's lead broadcast. ESPN and ABC's top team for 2020 featured Steve Levy (#2 announcer for Monday Night Football and lead studio host/play-by-play man for ESPN's NHL coverage), former Alabama Crimson Tide quarterback Greg McElroy, Tom Luginbill, and Dianna Russini, and their second team included Tom Hart (lead announcer for ESPN's SEC Network) and Joey Galloway. Former Indianapolis Colts punter Pat McAfee served as week 1 sideline reporter for the second team but withdrew after the first week out of discomfort in the role; he was replaced on the sidelines by Cole Cubelic (who works with Hart on SEC Network as a sideline reporter) and Molly McGrath in weeks 2–5. In lieu of network-employed rules analysts, Dean Blandino (one of Fox's NFL and College Football rules expert), head of officiating for the XFL is made available to analyze replay reviews and officials' rulings.

On February 6, 2020, the XFL announced a partnership with iHeartMedia and Vegas Stats & Information Network (VSiN), under which iHeartRadio would stream gambling-centric "BetCast" coverage of two games per-week. A league-produced pregame show was released before each game day on the XFL's official YouTube channel. Jonathan Coachman and Alyse Ashton served as the co-hosts. Coachman expressed anger at McMahon at not being paid for his work due to the league's bankruptcy, citing it as the main reason he chose not to return in 2023.

On May 17, 2022, it was announced that ESPN parent company The Walt Disney Company had acquired five years' exclusive rights to the XFL beginning in the 2023 season. All games are broadcast by either ESPN, ESPN2, ABC, or FX. The deal is worth between $100 million and $150 million. Some refute the idea and claimed that the XFL is not getting a rights fee from ESPN, and the agreement is a rights agreement for the games to be on the air, but without payment. In a tweet, Dwayne Johnson responded to the claims and said: "ESPN is a stakeholder in XFL. Long term partners", implying that ESPN are partners in the league. Ben Fischer of Sports Business Journal confirmed in March 2024 that The Walt Disney Company had purchased a stake in the XFL, a stake that carried over after the merger into the UFL.

=== International broadcasters ===
ESPN Latin America simulcasts select ESPN Deportes games through Disney-owned FOX Sports 2, except Argentina. ESPN International's ESPN Player service streams XFL games in Europe and MENA. ESPN's British partner BT Sport also airs XFL games. In Germany, Austria, and Switzerland, Sport1 and its pay-TV channel Sport1+ is broadcasting the XFL.

In Canada, the XFL is broadcast in English solely online through TSN+, a subscription over-the-top service owned by TSN. Games carried on ABC are available on traditional television in portions of the country via antenna, cable and satellite systems.

== Champions ==
XFL Champions
Date	Winning Team	Score	Losing Tean	Score	Stadium	Location	MVP	Attendance	Network	Viewership
April 26, 2020	Canceled amid the COVID-19 pandemic				TDECU Stadium	Houston, Texas	^{—}	^{—}	ESPN	^{—}
May 13, 2023	Arlington Renegades	35	DC Defenders	26	Alamodome	San Antonio, Texas	Luis Perez	22,754	ABC	1.40 million

== Reception and viewership ==
=== 2020 season ===
The XFL received mostly positive reviews on opening weekend. Conor Orr of Sports Illustrated credited the league with generating positive social media buzz without relying on a single viral event (as the Alliance of American Football, which Orr had eviscerated in a three-part series for SI less than a year prior, had done with a singular hit on AAF quarterback Mike Bercovici). Orr summarized the XFL as "on-the-rails, appropriately-quirky spring football." Michael David Smith of Profootballtalk.com noted that "there was a lot to like" about the league.

In a mixed review for USA Today, Lorenzo Reyes wrote that "There will be much that the league will want to learn from as it tries to grow." Another mixed review from Ben Kercheval at CBS Sports stated, "While Saturday provided fans with the type of excitement they were hoping to get from the league, Sunday was evidence that start-up leagues still face uphill battles getting watchable football on television."

Viewership for the first week of play averaged 3.1 million, but by Week 4 the average had decreased to 1.4 million. This led Smith of Profootballtalk.com to conclude that if "the XFL settles into the range of around 1 million to 2 million viewers per game and stabilizes throughout the season, the league would seem to be viable. If ratings continue to drop as the season progresses, that would spell trouble for the upstart league."

=== 2023 season ===
The XFL's second return to play began with a game between the Vegas Vipers and Arlington Renegades on Saturday, February 18, 2023. The first week of games received tentative praise, with Bill Shea of The Athletic grading the return a B− in an article titled, "I watched the XFL 3.0 so you don't have to (but you should!): The key takeaways." However, TV ratings declined in comparison to the XFL's 2020 debut. 1.54 million people watched the first game in 2023, down from the 3.3 million who watched the first game aired on ABC in 2020. Week 2's ratings again lagged as the games were the first to not air on broadcast television.

On March 12, the St. Louis BattleHawks eclipsed their own previously set attendance record from 2020 with 38,310 spectators at their first home game of the season, a game against the Arlington Renegades.

After the 2023 XFL Championship Game ESPN's vice president of programming and acquisitions, Tim Reed, expressed satisfaction with the viewership results.
