= 2023 XFL draft =

2023 American football player draft

General information
- Date: November 15–17, 2022
- Time: 8:30 AM PT
- Location: Enterprise, Nevada

Overview
- League: XFL

The 2023 XFL draft was the player selection process to fill the rosters of the eight teams for the 2023 XFL season, and the second draft in the rebooted version of the XFL history, following the 2020 draft.

The draft was held on November 15–17, 2022, with results released through the XFL's social media channels.

== Eligibility ==
The XFL 2023 draft pool consists of 1,700 players that are eligible. Of those, 528 players will advance to the preseason rosters.

XFL personnel have evaluated nearly 6,000 players in seven XFL showcases: Washington, D.C. (College Park, MD), HBCU (Jackson, MS), Florida (Bradenton, FL), Arizona (Tempe, AZ), Hawaii (Honolulu, HI), Texas (Arlington, TX) and "supplemental showcase" for players on the "XFL waitlist" in San Diego, CA, which was run by American National Combines (ANC). The league also held a separate "Specialist Showcase" run by Nick Novak's Novak Kicking & Consulting.

Selected players who participated in XFL showcases were given a "Player Pool Invitation" which was an official invitation to the 2023 draft. XFL personnel also evaluated and invited players from NFL training camps and tryouts. Players from 2020 XFL season were giving an automatic entry into the league's draft pool. International players were excluded, since the league was ineligible to seek P visas for players from outside the United States.

== Structure ==
The 2023 XFL Draft followed the same basic layout as the 2020 XFL draft: starting quarterbacks will be allocated in a separate process and revealed November 15, while the remaining positions will be separated by position. It followed a "snake" format, with each position phase following a random order set prior to the draft, and that order reversing between odd and even rounds of the phase.

- November 15
  - Phase 0: Quarterbacks—2 rounds
- November 16
  - Phase 1: offensive skill positions (running backs, wide receivers, and tight ends)—11 rounds
  - Phase 2: defensive backs (cornerbacks and safeties)—11 rounds
  - Phase 3: defensive front seven players (defensive linemen and linebackers)—11 rounds
  - Phase 4: offensive linemen (offensive tackles, guards, and centers)—11 rounds
- November 17
  - Phase 5: special teams (kicking players, long snappers)—3 rounds
  - Phase 6: open draft (any position)—11 rounds

A supplemental draft was held on January 1, 2023 to allow players who were obligated to another league at the time of the November draft (this included players from the 2022 USFL season who signed before a loophole in the league's reserve clause was closed, as well as players on National Football League practice squad) to join the league.

Teams did not have any reserve rights to any players they had employed in 2020, and thus all of the league's roster spots will be filled by way of the draft or the supplemental draft. Also, there were no territorial or college rights.

== Draft results ==
=== Phase 0: Tier 1 quarterback allocations ===
XFL team	Player	Pos.	College	Notes
Arlington Renegades	Kyle Sloter	QB	Northern Colorado	
Arlington Renegades	Drew Plitt	QB	Ball State	
DC Defenders	Eric Dungey	QB	Syracuse	
DC Defenders	D'Eriq King	QB	Miami (FL)	King was signed to the Carolina Panthers Practice Squad the day before the draft, and was assigned on a later date
Houston Roughnecks	Kaleb Eleby	QB	Western Michigan	
Houston Roughnecks	Brandon Silvers	QB	Troy	
Houston Roughnecks	Kurt Benkert	QB	Virginia	Benkert declined to sign a contract with the league; the Roughnecks retain his rights should he do so
Orlando Guardians	Quinten Dormady	QB	Central Michigan	
Orlando Guardians	Deondre Francois	QB	Hampton	
San Antonio Brahmas	Jawon Pass	QB	Prairie View A&M	
San Antonio Brahmas	Anthony Russo	QB	Michigan State	
Seattle Sea Dragons	Ben DiNucci	QB	James Madison	
Seattle Sea Dragons	Steven Montez	QB	Colorado	
St. Louis BattleHawks	A. J. McCarron	QB	Alabama	
St. Louis BattleHawks	Ryan Willis	QB	Virginia Tech	
Vegas Vipers	Jalan McClendon	QB	Baylor	
Vegas Vipers	Luis Perez	QB	Texas A&M–Commerce	

=== Phase 1: Skill Players ===
Rnd.	Pick #	XFL team	Player	Pos.	College	Notes
1	1	DC Defenders	Abram Smith	RB	Baylor	
1	2	St. Louis BattleHawks	Marcell Ateman	WR	Oklahoma State	
1	3	San Antonio Brahmas	Jacques Patrick	RB	Florida State	
1	4	Orlando Guardians	Charleston Rambo	WR	Miami (FL)	
1	5	Vegas Vipers	Martavis Bryant	WR	Clemson	
1	6	Seattle Sea Dragons	Kevin Shaa	WR	Liberty	
1	7	Arlington Renegades	Sal Cannella	TE	Auburn	
1	8	Houston Roughnecks	Adrian Killins	RB	UCF	
2	9	Houston Roughnecks	Garrett Owens	TE	Duquesne	
2	10	Arlington Renegades	De'Montre Tuggle	RB	Ohio	
2	11	Seattle Sea Dragons	T. J. Hammonds	RB	Arkansas	
2	12	Vegas Vipers	John Lovett	RB	Penn State	
2	13	Orlando Guardians	Andrew Jamiel	WR	Stonehill	
2	14	San Antonio Brahmas	Calvin Turner	RB	Hawaii	
2	15	St. Louis BattleHawks	Ja'Marcus Bradley	WR	Louisiana–Lafayette	
2	16	DC Defenders	Jequez Ezzard	WR	Sam Houston State	
3	17	DC Defenders	K. D. Cannon	WR	Baylor	
3	18	St. Louis BattleHawks	Jaylen Smith	TE	Louisville	
3	19	San Antonio Brahmas	Kendrick Rogers	WR	Texas A&M	
3	20	Orlando Guardians	Stephen Guidry	WR	Mississippi State	
3	21	Vegas Vipers	Brandon Dillon	TE	Marian (IN)	
3	22	Seattle Sea Dragons	Juwan Green	WR	SUNY Albany	
3	23	Arlington Renegades	LuJuan Winningham	WR	Central Arkansas	
3	24	Houston Roughnecks	Cedric Byrd	WR	Hawaii	
4	25	Houston Roughnecks	Deontay Burnett	WR	USC	
4	26	Arlington Renegades	Brandon Arconado	WR	Washington State	
4	27	Seattle Sea Dragons	Jahcour Pearson	WR	Ole Miss	
4	28	Vegas Vipers	Sean Price	TE	South Florida	
4	29	Orlando Guardians	Ryan Becker	TE	SMU	
4	30	San Antonio Brahmas	Jalen Tolliver	WR	Arkansas–Monticello	
4	31	St. Louis BattleHawks	Mataeo Durant	RB	Duke	
4	32	DC Defenders	Jazz Ferguson	WR	Northwestern State	
5	33	DC Defenders	Briley Moore	TE	Kansas State	
5	34	St. Louis BattleHawks	Darrius Shepherd	WR	North Dakota State	
5	35	San Antonio Brahmas	Dylan Parham	TE	NC State	
5	36	Orlando Guardians	Jah-Maine Martin	RB	North Carolina A&T	
5	37	Vegas Vipers	Matt Jones	RB	Florida	
5	38	Seattle Sea Dragons	Brenden Knox	RB	Marshall	
5	39	Arlington Renegades	Keith Ford	RB	Texas A&M	
5	40	Houston Roughnecks	Justin Smith	WR	Norfolk State	
6	41	Houston Roughnecks	Max Borghi	RB	Washington State	
6	42	Arlington Renegades	Shaun Beyer	TE	Iowa	
6	43	Seattle Sea Dragons	Damion Willis	WR	Troy	
6	44	Vegas Vipers	Jeff Badet	WR	Oklahoma	
6	45	Orlando Guardians	Dontez Byrd	WR	Tennessee Tech	
6	46	San Antonio Brahmas	Kalen Ballage	RB	Arizona State	
6	47	St. Louis BattleHawks	Brian Hill	RB	Wyoming	
6	48	DC Defenders	Ryquell Armstead	RB	Temple	
7	49	DC Defenders	Pooka Williams	RB	Kansas	
7	50	St. Louis BattleHawks	Jordan Thomas	TE	Mississippi State	
7	51	San Antonio Brahmas	Alize Mack	TE	Notre Dame	
7	52	Orlando Guardians	Devin Darrington	RB	Virginia	
7	53	Vegas Vipers	Isiah Macklin	WR	NC Central	
7	54	Seattle Sea Dragons	Rashard Davis	WR	James Madison	
7	55	Arlington Renegades	JaCorey Sullivan	WR	Central Michigan	
7	56	Houston Roughnecks	Jontre Kirklin	WR	LSU	
8	57	Houston Roughnecks	Aaron Nelson	WR	Delaware Valley	
8	58	Arlington Renegades	Alex Ellis	TE	Tennessee	
8	59	Seattle Sea Dragons	Tayvian Cunningham	WR	Arizona	
8	60	Vegas Vipers	Mathew Sexton	WR	Eastern Michigan	
8	61	Orlando Guardians	Octayvius Miles	WR	Alabama A&M	
8	62	San Antonio Brahmas	Terry Wright	WR	Purdue	
8	63	St. Louis BattleHawks	Donteea Dye	WR	Heidelberg	
8	64	DC Defenders	Ethan Wolf	TE	Tennessee	
9	65	DC Defenders	Josh Hammond	WR	Florida	
9	66	St. Louis BattleHawks	Abdul Adams	RB	Syracuse	
9	67	San Antonio Brahmas	T. J. Vasher	WR	Texas Tech	
9	68	Orlando Guardians	Patrick Smith	WR	Tennessee State	
9	69	Vegas Vipers	DeAndre Torrey	RB	North Texas	
9	70	Seattle Sea Dragons	Joshua Perkins	TE	Washington	
9	71	Arlington Renegades	Jackson Anthrop	WR	Purdue	
9	72	Houston Roughnecks	Darece Roberson	WR	Wayne State	
10	73	Houston Roughnecks	B. J. Byrd	WR	Morehead State	
10	74	Arlington Renegades	Dexter Williams	RB	Notre Dame	
10	75	Seattle Sea Dragons	Scottie Phillips	RB	Ole Miss	
10	76	Vegas Vipers	Saeed Blacknall	WR	Penn State	
10	77	Orlando Guardians	Dieuly Aristilde	WR	Bethel (TN)	
10	78	San Antonio Brahmas	Travis Jonsen	WR	Montana State	
10	79	St. Louis BattleHawks	Jovani Haskins	TE	Rutgers	
10	80	DC Defenders	Kahale Warring	TE	San Diego State	
11	81	DC Defenders	Lucky Jackson	WR	Western Kentucky	
11	82	St. Louis BattleHawks	Austin Proehl	WR	North Carolina	
11	83	San Antonio Brahmas	Deandre Goolsby	TE	Florida	
11	84	Orlando Guardians	Cody Latimer	WR	Indiana	
11	85	Vegas Vipers	Grayson Gunter	TE	Southern Miss	
11	86	Seattle Sea Dragons	Jaylon Redd	WR	Oregon	
11	87	Arlington Renegades	Jordan Smallwood	WR	Oklahoma	
11	88	Houston Roughnecks	Brycen Alleyne	RB	Delaware State	

=== Phase 2: Defensive backs ===
Rnd.	Pick #	XFL team	Player	Pos.	College	Notes
1	1	Orlando Guardians	C. J. Holmes	CB	Jackson State	
1	2	San Antonio Brahmas	Luq Barcoo	CB	San Diego State	
1	3	St. Louis BattleHawks	Ben DeLuca	S	UNC Charlotte	
1	4	DC Defenders	Parnell Motley	CB	Oklahoma	
1	5	Houston Roughnecks	Raleigh Texada	CB	Baylor	
1	6	Arlington Renegades	De'Vante Bausby	CB	Pitt State	
1	7	Seattle Sea Dragons	Chris Jones	CB	Nebraska	
1	8	Vegas Vipers	Keylon Kennedy	CB	Garden City CC	
2	9	Vegas Vipers	Jameson Houston	CB	Baylor	
2	10	Seattle Sea Dragons	Antoine Brooks	S	Maryland	
2	11	Arlington Renegades	Josh Hawkins	CB	East Carolina	
2	12	Houston Roughnecks	Ajene Harris	CB	USC	
2	13	DC Defenders	DeJuan Neal	CB	Shepherd	
2	14	St. Louis BattleHawks	Channing Stribling	CB	Michigan	
2	15	San Antonio Brahmas	Kary Vincent Jr.	CB	LSU	
2	16	Orlando Guardians	Javaris Davis	CB	Auburn	
3	17	Orlando Guardians	Dee Virgin	CB	West Alabama	
3	18	San Antonio Brahmas	Bubba Bolden	SS	Miami (FL)	
3	19	St. Louis BattleHawks	Quenton Meeks	CB	Stanford	
3	20	DC Defenders	Anthoula Kelly	CB	Fresno State	
3	21	Houston Roughnecks	A. J. Hendy	S	Maryland	
3	22	Arlington Renegades	Will Hill	S	Florida	
3	23	Seattle Sea Dragons	Linden Stephens	CB	Cincinnati	
3	24	Vegas Vipers	Maurice Smith	S	Georgia	
4	25	Vegas Vipers	Mister Harriel	S	California State–Sacramento	
4	26	Seattle Sea Dragons	Shabari Davis	CB	Southeast Missouri State	
4	27	Arlington Renegades	Robert Nelson	CB	Arizona State	
4	28	Houston Roughnecks	Devin Hafford	CB	Tarleton State	
4	29	DC Defenders	Kentrell Brice	SS	Louisiana Tech	
4	30	St. Louis BattleHawks	Brandon Sebastian	CB	Boston College	
4	31	San Antonio Brahmas	Elijah Jones	CB	Oregon State	
4	32	Orlando Guardians	Mike Lee	CB	Kansas	
5	33	Orlando Guardians	Antwan Collier	S	Florida A&M	
5	34	San Antonio Brahmas	Abrae Booker-Currin	FS	Adams State	
5	35	St. Louis BattleHawks	Evan Fields	S	Arizona State	
5	36	DC Defenders	Joshua Allen	SS	Miami (OH)	
5	37	Houston Roughnecks	Alexander Myres	CB	Houston	
5	38	Arlington Renegades	Shakur Brown	CB	Michigan State	
5	39	Seattle Sea Dragons	Reggie Robinson	CB	Tulsa	
5	40	Vegas Vipers	Nijuel Hill	CB	Delaware	
6	41	Vegas Vipers	Nick Pickett	S	Oregon	
6	42	Seattle Sea Dragons	Kareem Orr	CB	Tennessee–Chattanooga	
6	43	Arlington Renegades	Cameron Lewis	S	LSU	
6	44	Houston Roughnecks	Kevin Toliver	CB	LSU	
6	45	DC Defenders	Cortez Davis	CB	Hawaii	
6	46	St. Louis BattleHawks	Elijah Hamilton	CB	Louisiana Tech	
6	47	San Antonio Brahmas	Terrell Bonds	CB	Tennessee State	
6	48	Orlando Guardians	Maurice Smitherman	CB	Mississippi State	
7	49	Orlando Guardians	Marcus Murphy	S	Mississippi State	
7	50	San Antonio Brahmas	Coney Durr	CB	Minnesota	
7	51	St. Louis BattleHawks	Jonathan Alexander	S	UNC Charlotte	
7	52	DC Defenders	Santos Ramirez	S	Arkansas	
7	53	Houston Roughnecks	Jordan Mosley	S	Maryland	
7	54	Arlington Renegades	Delonte Hood	CB	Peru State	
7	55	Seattle Sea Dragons	Qwynnterrio Cole	S	Louisville	
7	56	Vegas Vipers	Antonio Phillips	CB	Ball State	
8	57	Vegas Vipers	Will Adams	S	Virginia State	
8	58	Seattle Sea Dragons	Rojesterman Farris	CB	Hawaii	
8	59	Arlington Renegades	Rahim Moore	FS	UCLA	
8	60	Houston Roughnecks	Brandon Easterling	S	Dayton	
8	61	DC Defenders	Travon Fuller	CB	Tulsa	
8	62	St. Louis BattleHawks	D'Angelo Ross	CB	New Mexico	
8	63	San Antonio Brahmas	Ryan Lewis	CB	Pitt	
8	64	Orlando Guardians	Roman Tatum	CB	Southern Illinois	
9	65	Orlando Guardians	Najeem Hosein	FS	Ferris State	
9	66	San Antonio Brahmas	Cedric Stone	S	Liberty	
9	67	St. Louis BattleHawks	Lukas Denis	S	Boston College	
9	68	DC Defenders	Junior Faulk	CB	Delta State	
9	69	Houston Roughnecks	Michael Lawson	FS	Western Illinois	
9	70	Arlington Renegades	Abu Daramy-Swaray	CB	Colgate	
9	71	Seattle Sea Dragons	Kendall Karcz	S	St. Norbert	
9	72	Vegas Vipers	Deontay Anderson	S	Houston	
10	73	Vegas Vipers	Adam Sparks	CB	Louisiana–Monroe	
10	74	Seattle Sea Dragons	Roger Cray	CB	Old Dominion	
10	75	Arlington Renegades	T. J. Green	S	Clemson	
10	76	Houston Roughnecks	David Tolentino	CB	Grand View	
10	77	DC Defenders	C. J. Anthony	S	Garden City CC	
10	78	St. Louis BattleHawks	Tareke Lewis	CB	Utah	
10	79	San Antonio Brahmas	Tenny Adewusi	S	Delaware	
10	80	Orlando Guardians	Shaquille Wiggins	CB	Tennessee	
11	81	Orlando Guardians	Matt Elam	S	Florida	
11	82	San Antonio Brahmas	Jack Koerner	S	Iowa	
11	83	St. Louis BattleHawks	Mike Hampton	CB	South Florida	
11	84	DC Defenders	Holton Hill	CB	Texas	
11	85	Houston Roughnecks	John Brannon	CB	Western Carolina	
11	86	Arlington Renegades	Donatello Brown	CB	Valdosta State	
11	87	Seattle Sea Dragons	Mykael Wright	CB	Oregon	
11	88	Vegas Vipers	Stephen Roberts	SS	Auburn	

=== Phase 3: Defensive front seven ===
Rnd.	Pick #	XFL team	Player	Pos.	College	Notes
1	1	Vegas Vipers	Vic Beasley	LB	Clemson	
1	2	Seattle Sea Dragons	Elijah Ponder	DT	Cincinnati	
1	3	Arlington Renegades	Otaro Alaka	LB	Texas A&M	
1	4	Houston Roughnecks	Deandre Johnson	LB	Miami (FL)	
1	5	DC Defenders	Niles Scott	DT	Frostburg State	
1	6	St. Louis BattleHawks	Lakiem Williams	LB	Syracuse	
1	7	San Antonio Brahmas	Justin Alexandre	DT	Incarnate Word	
1	8	Orlando Guardians	Nick Coe	DE	Auburn	
2	9	Orlando Guardians	Gerald Willis	DT	Miami (FL)	
2	10	San Antonio Brahmas	Riko Jeffers	LB	Texas Tech	
2	11	St. Louis BattleHawks	Emeke Egbule	LB	Houston	
2	12	DC Defenders	Andre Mintze	LB	Vanderbilt	
2	13	Houston Roughnecks	John Daka	DE	James Madison	
2	14	Arlington Renegades	Josiah Coatney	DT	Ole Miss	
2	15	Seattle Sea Dragons	Niko Lalos	DE	Dartmouth	
2	16	Vegas Vipers	Max Roberts	LB	Boston College	
3	17	Vegas Vipers	Robert Windsor	DT	Penn State	
3	18	Seattle Sea Dragons	Curtis Weaver	DE	Boise State	
3	19	Arlington Renegades	Will Clarke	DE	West Virginia	
3	20	Houston Roughnecks	Tavante Beckett	LB	Marshall	
3	21	DC Defenders	Jacub Panasiuk	DE	Michigan State	
3	22	St. Louis BattleHawks	Willie Harvey	LB	Iowa State	
3	23	San Antonio Brahmas	Denzel Chukwukelu	DT	Texas–El Paso	
3	24	Orlando Guardians	Stansly Maponga	DE	TCU	
4	25	Orlando Guardians	Keonte Schad	DT	Oregon State	
4	26	San Antonio Brahmas	Youhanna Ghaifan	DT	Wyoming	
4	27	St. Louis BattleHawks	LaCale London	DT	Western Illinois	
4	28	DC Defenders	Fadol Brown	DE	Ole Miss	
4	29	Houston Roughnecks	Elijah Qualls	DT	Washington	
4	30	Arlington Renegades	DaVonte Lambert	DT	Auburn	
4	31	Seattle Sea Dragons	Austin Faoliu	DT	Oregon	
4	32	Vegas Vipers	Pita Taumoepenu	LB	Utah	
5	33	Vegas Vipers	Jah'Sheem Martin	DT	Pace	
5	34	Seattle Sea Dragons	Jordan Evans	LB	Oklahoma	
5	35	Arlington Renegades	Jessie Lemonier	LB	Liberty	
5	36	Houston Roughnecks	Austin Edwards	DE	Ferris State	
5	37	DC Defenders	Anthony Hines	LB	Texas A&M	
5	38	St. Louis BattleHawks	Kevin Atkins	DT	Fresno State	
5	39	San Antonio Brahmas	Owen Carney	LB	Illinois	
5	40	Orlando Guardians	Emmanuel Olenga	DE	Tennessee State	
6	41	Orlando Guardians	Terrance Smith	LB	Florida State	
6	42	San Antonio Brahmas	Omari Cobb	LB	Marshall	
6	43	St. Louis BattleHawks	Drew Singleton	LB	Rutgers	
6	44	DC Defenders	Dame Ndiaye	DE	Portland State	
6	45	Houston Roughnecks	Chauncey Rivers	LB	Mississippi State	
6	46	Arlington Renegades	Bruce Hector	DT	South Florida	
6	47	Seattle Sea Dragons	Tre Walker	LB	Idaho	
6	48	Vegas Vipers	D. J. Calhoun	LB	Arizona State	
7	49	Vegas Vipers	Paul Dawson	LB	TCU	
7	50	Seattle Sea Dragons	Daniel Joseph	DE	NC State	
7	51	Arlington Renegades	Ryan Mueller	DE	Kansas State	
7	52	Houston Roughnecks	Tariqious Tisdale	DE	Ole Miss	
7	53	DC Defenders	Jamal Brooks	LB	South Alabama	
7	54	St. Louis BattleHawks	Elorm Lumor	DE	Towson	
7	55	San Antonio Brahmas	Prince Emili	DT	Penn	
7	56	Orlando Guardians	Terrance Plummer	LB	UCF	
8	57	Orlando Guardians	Caeveon Patton	DT	Texas State	
8	58	San Antonio Brahmas	Andrzej Hughes-Murray	LB	Oregon State	
8	59	St. Louis BattleHawks	Gelen Robinson	DE	Purdue	
8	60	DC Defenders	Joseph Wallace	DT	Sam Houston State	
8	61	Houston Roughnecks	Ellis Brooks	LB	Penn State	
8	62	Arlington Renegades	Doug Costin	DT	Miami (OH)	
8	63	Seattle Sea Dragons	Emmanuel Smith	LB	Vanderbilt	
8	64	Vegas Vipers	C. J. Avery	LB	Louisville	
9	65	Vegas Vipers	LaRon Stokes	DE	Oklahoma	
9	66	Seattle Sea Dragons	Antwuan Jackson	DT	Ohio State	
9	67	Arlington Renegades	Nick Temple	LB	Cincinnati	
9	68	Houston Roughnecks	Diego Fagot	LB	Navy	
9	69	DC Defenders	Aaron Sterling	LB	South Carolina	
9	70	St. Louis BattleHawks	Mike Rose	LB	Iowa State	
9	71	San Antonio Brahmas	Joel Dublanko	LB	Cincinnati	
9	72	Orlando Guardians	Khristian Tate	DT	Georgetown	
10	73	Orlando Guardians	Jacoby Jones	DE	Texas	
10	74	San Antonio Brahmas	Drew Beesley	DE	Michigan State	
10	75	St. Louis BattleHawks	Seth Walter	DE	Dartmouth	
10	76	DC Defenders	Jarrell Owens	DE	Oklahoma State	
10	77	Houston Roughnecks	C. J. Brewer	DT	Coastal Carolina	
10	78	Arlington Renegades	Josh Watson	LB	Colorado State	
10	79	Seattle Sea Dragons	Tuzar Skipper	LB	Toledo	
10	80	Vegas Vipers	Rod Henderson	DT	Alabama State	
11	81	Vegas Vipers	Jawuan Johnson	LB	TCU	
11	82	Seattle Sea Dragons	P. J. Hall	DE	Sam Houston State	
11	83	Arlington Renegades	Isaiah Graham-Mobley	LB	Boston College	
11	84	Houston Roughnecks	Jaquan Artis	DE	Lenoir–Rhyne	
11	85	DC Defenders	Jordan Williams	DT	Virginia Tech	
11	86	St. Louis BattleHawks	Phil Campbell	LB	Pitt	
11	87	San Antonio Brahmas	Mike Tverdov	DE	Rutgers	
11	88	Orlando Guardians	DeCalon Brooks	LB	Florida State	

=== Phase 4: Offensive line ===
Rnd.	Pick #	XFL team	Player	Pos.	College	Notes
1	1	Houston Roughnecks	Jack Snyder	OL	San Jose State	
1	2	Arlington Renegades	Cameron Hunt	OL	Oregon	
1	3	Seattle Sea Dragons	Chris Owens	OL	Alabama	
1	4	Vegas Vipers	Antonio Garcia	OL	Troy	
1	5	Orlando Guardians	Brandon Murphy	OL	St. Thomas	
1	6	San Antonio Brahmas	Luke Juriga	OL	Western Michigan	
1	7	St. Louis BattleHawks	Jaryd Jones-Smith	OL	Pitt	
1	8	DC Defenders	TJ Storment	OL	Texas Tech	
2	9	DC Defenders	Cody Conway	OL	Syracuse	
2	10	St. Louis BattleHawks	Shane Carpenter	OL	Louisiana Tech	
2	11	San Antonio Brahmas	Darius James	OL	Auburn	
2	12	Orlando Guardians	Kamalie Matthews	OL	Murray State	
2	13	Vegas Vipers	Ben Petrula	OL	Boston College	
2	14	Seattle Sea Dragons	Michal Menet	OL	Penn State	
2	15	Arlington Renegades	Garrett McGhin	OL	East Carolina	
2	16	Houston Roughnecks	Desmond Noel	OL	Florida Atlantic	
3	17	Houston Roughnecks	Shamarious Gilmore	OL	Georgia State	
3	18	Arlington Renegades	Mike Horton	OL	Auburn	
3	19	Seattle Sea Dragons	Jacob Capra	OL	San Diego State	
3	20	Vegas Vipers	Dohnovan West	OL	Arizona State	
3	21	Orlando Guardians	Jachai Baker	OL	South Alabama	
3	22	San Antonio Brahmas	Willie Wright	OL	Tulsa	
3	23	St. Louis BattleHawks	Steven Gonzalez	OL	Penn State	
3	24	DC Defenders	Ty Clary	OL	Arkansas	
4	25	DC Defenders	Greg Long	OL	Purdue	
4	26	St. Louis BattleHawks	Jay Williams	OL	Florida A&M	
4	27	San Antonio Brahmas	Marcus Tatum	OL	UCF	
4	28	Orlando Guardians	T. J. Bradley	OL	Maryland	
4	29	Vegas Vipers	Jamil Demby	OL	Maine	
4	30	Seattle Sea Dragons	Julien Davenport	OL	Bucknell	
4	31	Arlington Renegades	Darta Lee	OL	Texas–El Paso	
4	32	Houston Roughnecks	Sam Cooper	OL	Merrimack	
5	33	Houston Roughnecks	Tommy Champion	OL	Mississippi State	
5	34	Arlington Renegades	Cam Carter	OL	Murray State	
5	35	Seattle Sea Dragons	Liam Jimmons	OL	USC	
5	36	Vegas Vipers	Clayton Bradley	OL	Nevada–Las Vegas	
5	37	Orlando Guardians	Joshua Frazier	OL	Alabama	
5	38	San Antonio Brahmas	Malcolm Bunche	OL	UCLA	
5	39	St. Louis BattleHawks	Jon Toth	OL	Kentucky	
5	40	DC Defenders	D’Marcus Hayes	OL	Georgia	
6	41	DC Defenders	Michael Maietti	OL	Missouri	
6	42	St. Louis BattleHawks	Tison Gray	OL	South Carolina State	
6	43	San Antonio Brahmas	Roubbens Joseph	OL	SUNY Buffalo	
6	44	Orlando Guardians	Zeveyon Furcron	OL	Southern Illinois	
6	45	Vegas Vipers	Michael Miller	OL	Washburn	
6	46	Seattle Sea Dragons	Paul Grattan	OL	UCLA	
6	47	Arlington Renegades	Boe Wilson	OL	Western Kentucky	
6	48	Houston Roughnecks	Kary Kutsch	OL	Colorado	
7	49	Houston Roughnecks	Dareuan Parker	OL	Mississippi State	
7	50	Arlington Renegades	Jake Stetz	OL	Boise State	
7	51	Seattle Sea Dragons	Frank Ball	OL	Virginia State	
7	52	Vegas Vipers	Quinterrius Eatmon	OL	South Florida	
7	53	Orlando Guardians	Jordan Ighofose	OL	Grambling	
7	54	San Antonio Brahmas	Norman Price	OL	Southern Miss	
7	55	St. Louis BattleHawks	Daishawn Dixon	OL	San Diego State	
7	56	DC Defenders	Dwayne Wallace	OL	Kansas	
8	57	DC Defenders	Tyler Witt	OL	Purdue	
8	58	St. Louis BattleHawks	Bryce Foxworth	OL	Southern Miss	
8	59	San Antonio Brahmas	Kohl Levao	OL	Hawaii	
8	60	Orlando Guardians	Jalen Spady	OL	Florida A&M	
8	61	Vegas Vipers	Avery Young	OL	Auburn	
8	62	Seattle Sea Dragons	Tyrin Arceneaux	OL	West Georgia	
8	63	Arlington Renegades	Brian Folkerts	OL	Washburn	
8	64	Houston Roughnecks	Dylan Pasquali	OL	Ferris State	
9	65	Houston Roughnecks	Alex Mollette	OL	Marshall	
9	66	Arlington Renegades	Keene Forbes	OL	Florida A&M	
9	67	Seattle Sea Dragons	Jovann Letuli	OL	Akron	
9	68	Vegas Vipers	Tony Adams	OL	NC State	
9	69	Orlando Guardians	Shawn Page	OL	Merrimack	
9	70	San Antonio Brahmas	Johnathan Irizarry	OL	Mississippi Valley State	
9	71	St. Louis BattleHawks	Christian Olmstead	OL	Findlay	
9	72	DC Defenders	Liam Fornadel	OL	James Madison	
10	73	DC Defenders	No Selection Made			
10	74	St. Louis BattleHawks	No Selection Made			
10	75	San Antonio Brahmas	No Selection Made			
10	76	Orlando Guardians	Sunday Deng	OL	Northwestern Oklahoma State	
10	77	Vegas Vipers	Tre Johnson	OL	Jackson State	
10	78	Seattle Sea Dragons	No Selection Made			
10	79	Arlington Renegades	No Selection Made			
10	80	Houston Roughnecks	No Selection Made			
11	81	Houston Roughnecks	No Selection Made			
11	82	Arlington Renegades	No Selection Made			
11	83	Seattle Sea Dragons	No Selection Made			
11	84	Vegas Vipers	Fernando Frye	OL	East Carolina	
11	85	Orlando Guardians	No Selection Made			
11	86	San Antonio Brahmas	No Selection Made			
11	87	St. Louis BattleHawks	No Selection Made			
11	88	DC Defenders	No Selection Made			

=== Phase 5: Specialists ===
The specialist draft consisted of three rounds with a total of 24 players selected. Each team selected a long snapper, a kicker and a punter.

Rnd.	Pick #	XFL team	Player	Pos.	College	Notes
1	1	Arlington Renegades	Taylor Russolino	K	Millsaps	
1	2	DC Defenders	Daniel Whelan	P	UC Davis	
1	3	St. Louis BattleHawks	Sterling Hofrichter	P	Syracuse	
1	4	Vegas Vipers	Michael Carrizosa	P	San Jose State	
1	5	Houston Roughnecks	Hunter Duplessis	K	UTSA	
1	6	Orlando Guardians	José Borregales	K	Miami (FL)	
1	7	San Antonio Brahmas	Rex Sunahara	LS	West Virginia	
1	8	Seattle Sea Dragons	Thomas Fletcher	LS	Alabama	
2	9	Seattle Sea Dragons	Cameron Nizialek	P	Georgia	
2	10	San Antonio Brahmas	John Parker Romo	K	Virginia Tech	
2	11	Orlando Guardians	Tommy Auger	LS	St. John's (MN)	
2	12	Houston Roughnecks	Brian Khoury	LS	Carnegie Mellon	
2	13	Vegas Vipers	Bailey Giffen	K	Lamar	
2	14	St. Louis BattleHawks	Donny Hageman	K	San Diego State	
2	15	DC Defenders	Erik Lawson	LS	East Carolina	
2	16	Arlington Renegades	Antonio Ortiz	LS	TCU	
3	17	Arlington Renegades	Marquette King	P	Fort Valley State	
3	18	DC Defenders	Jake Schum	P	SUNY Buffalo	
3	19	St. Louis BattleHawks	Billy Taylor	LS	Rutgers	
3	20	Vegas Vipers	Adam Higuera	LS	Tulsa	
3	21	Houston Roughnecks	Race Porter	P	Washington	
3	22	Orlando Guardians	Andrew Anckle	P	McKendree	
3	23	San Antonio Brahmas	Brad Wing	P	LSU	
3	24	Seattle Sea Dragons	Brandon Ruiz	K	Mississippi State	

=== Phase 6: Open draft ===
Rnd.	Pick #	XFL team	Player	Pos.	College	Notes
1	1	Seattle Sea Dragons	Josh Seltzner	OL	Wisconsin	
1	2	San Antonio Brahmas	Matthew Gotel	DT	Webber International	
1	3	Orlando Guardians	Jeremiah Gemmel	LB	North Carolina	
1	4	Houston Roughnecks	Chauncey Manac	LB	Louisiana–Lafayette	
1	5	Vegas Vipers	Travis Koontz	TE	Texas Tech	
1	6	St. Louis BattleHawks	Allie Green	CB	Missouri	
1	7	DC Defenders	Zimari Manning	WR	Tarleton State	
1	8	Arlington Renegades	Sean Modster	WR	Boise State	
2	9	Arlington Renegades	Edmond Robinson	LB	Newberry	
2	10	DC Defenders	Reggie Stubblefield	DB	Kansas State	
2	11	St. Louis BattleHawks	George Campbell	WR	West Virginia	
2	12	Vegas Vipers	Jalen Pinkney	DE	Northern Illinois	
2	13	Houston Roughnecks	Duke Ejiofor	LB	Wake Forest	
2	14	Orlando Guardians	Lakia Henry	LB	Ole Miss	
2	15	San Antonio Brahmas	Julian McCleod	DE	Wagner	
2	16	Seattle Sea Dragons	Sama Paama	DL	Washington	
3	17	Seattle Sea Dragons	Julius Turner	DT	Rutgers	
3	18	San Antonio Brahmas	Landen Akers	WR	Iowa State	
3	19	Orlando Guardians	Erroll Thompson	LB	Mississippi State	
3	20	Houston Roughnecks	Ben Putman	WR	Nevada	
3	21	Vegas Vipers	Marwin Evans	SS	Utah State	
3	22	St. Louis BattleHawks	Damion Daniels	DT	Nebraska	
3	23	DC Defenders	Jesse Aniebonam	DE	Maryland	
3	24	Arlington Renegades	Kenneth Farrow	RB	Houston	
4	25	Arlington Renegades	T. J. Barnes	DT	Georgia Tech	
4	26	DC Defenders	Manasseh Bailey	WR	Morgan State	
4	27	St. Louis BattleHawks	Steven Mitchell	WR	USC	
4	28	Vegas Vipers	Mustageem Williams	WR	Tennessee	
4	29	Houston Roughnecks	Travell Harris	WR	Washington State	
4	30	Orlando Guardians	Abram Holland	OL	New Mexico State	
4	31	San Antonio Brahmas	Stephen Denmark	CB	Valdosta State	
4	32	Seattle Sea Dragons	Blake Jackson	WR	Mary Hardin-Baylor	
5	33	Seattle Sea Dragons	McLane Mannix	WR	Texas Tech	
5	34	San Antonio Brahmas	Dai'Jean Dixon	WR	Nicholls State	
5	35	Orlando Guardians	D'Anfernee McGriff	TE	Florida State	
5	36	Houston Roughnecks	Trevon Mason	DT	Arizona	
5	37	Vegas Vipers	Cinque Sweeting	WR	Slippery Rock	
5	38	St. Louis BattleHawks	Leddie Brown	RB	West Virginia	
5	39	DC Defenders	Artavis Pierce	RB	Oregon State	
5	40	Arlington Renegades	Isaac Nauta	TE	Georgia	
6	41	Arlington Renegades	Micah Dew-Treadway	DT	Minnesota	
6	42	DC Defenders	Simmie Cobbs	WR	Indiana	
6	43	St. Louis BattleHawks	Silas Kelly	LB	Coastal Carolina	
6	44	Vegas Vipers	Cassanova McKinzy	LB	Auburn	
6	45	Houston Roughnecks	Brandon Lewis	WR	Air Force	
6	46	Orlando Guardians	Mark Williams	CB	Eastern Illinois	
6	47	San Antonio Brahmas	Ben Davis	LB	Texas	
6	48	Seattle Sea Dragons	Jaylin Thomas	LB	Ball State	
7	49	Seattle Sea Dragons	Erik Hansen	DE	Upper Iowa	
7	50	San Antonio Brahmas	Rico Gafford	CB	Wyoming	
7	51	Orlando Guardians	Tyler Williams	CB	Mississippi State	
7	52	Houston Roughnecks	Koby Quansah	LB	Duke	
7	53	Vegas Vipers	Nick Guggemos	TE	St. Thomas	
7	54	St. Louis BattleHawks	Jake Sutherland	TE	Morehead State	
7	55	DC Defenders	K. J. Sails	CB	South Florida	
7	56	Arlington Renegades	Flynn Nagel	WR	Northwestern	
8	57	Arlington Renegades	Joe Powell	SS	Globe Institute of Technology	
8	58	DC Defenders	No Selection Made			
8	59	St. Louis BattleHawks	Gary Jennings	WR	West Virginia	
8	60	Vegas Vipers	Luke Holloway	LB	Idaho State	
8	61	Houston Roughnecks	Warren Thomas	LB	Midland Lutheran	
8	62	Orlando Guardians	Lashard Durr	CB	Mississippi State	
8	63	San Antonio Brahmas	Jon Hilliman	RB	Rutgers	
8	64	Seattle Sea Dragons	O'Bryan Goodson	DT	Memphis	
9	65	Seattle Sea Dragons	No Selection Made			
9	66	San Antonio Brahmas	No Selection Made			
9	67	Orlando Guardians	Justin Rogers	CB	Texas–El Paso	
9	68	Houston Roughnecks	Trevor Allen	RB	Northern Iowa	
9	69	Vegas Vipers	Rod Smith	RB	Ohio State	
9	70	St. Louis BattleHawks	Taniela Tupou	DT	Washington	
9	71	DC Defenders	No Selection Made			
9	72	Arlington Renegades	Glen Logan	DT	LSU	
10	73	Arlington Renegades	No Selection Made			
10	74	DC Defenders	No Selection Made			
10	75	St. Louis BattleHawks	No Selection Made			
10	76	Vegas Vipers	Devion Clayton	WR		Clayton did not attend college
10	77	Houston Roughnecks	Mike Boykin	DE	North Alabama	
10	78	Orlando Guardians	Kelvin Taylor	RB	Florida	
10	79	San Antonio Brahmas	No Selection Made			
10	80	Seattle Sea Dragons	Alex Thomas	FS	Ferris State	
11	81	Seattle Sea Dragons	Morgan Ellison	RB	Southeastern Louisiana	
11	82	San Antonio Brahmas	No Selection Made			
11	83	Orlando Guardians	Bruce Thompson	WR	Langston	
11	84	Houston Roughnecks	Andrew Whitaker	CB	Washington (MO)	
11	85	Vegas Vipers	No Selection Made			
11	86	St. Louis BattleHawks	No Selection Made			
11	87	DC Defenders	No Selection Made			
11	88	Arlington Renegades	No Selection Made			

=== Phase 7: Additional quarterback allocations ===
Rnd.	Pick #	XFL team	Player	Pos.	College	Notes
1	1	Arlington Renegades	Kevin Anderson	QB	Fordham	
1	2	DC Defenders	No Selection Made			Jordan Ta'amu was assigned to DC on January 6, 2023, after his contract expired
1	3	Houston Roughnecks	Cole McDonald	QB	Hawaii	
1	4	Vegas Vipers	No Selection Made			Bryan Scott was assigned on January 1, 2023, after his USFL contract expired
1	5	Orlando Guardians	Mitch Kidd	QB	Redlands	
1	6	Seattle Sea Dragons	Brian Lewerke	QB	Michigan State	
1	7	St. Louis BattleHawks	Nick Tiano	QB	Tennessee-Chattanooga	
1	8	San Antonio Brahmas	Reid Sinnett	QB	San Diego	
2	9	San Antonio Brahmas	Jack Coan	QB	Notre Dame	

== Supplemental draft ==
XFL supplemental draft was held 1 January 2023. The draft consisted of 17 rounds, with a total of 90 players selected. The teams followed a snake-style format with the pick order reversing each round. The selections included 1) players who were previously ineligible to be drafted, and 2) players who were not selected during the XFL Draft November 16-17. NFL Alumni Academy graduates who were not selected will be assigned to teams and instructed to report to training camp with their teammates.

Rnd.	Pick #	XFL team	Player	Pos.	College	Notes
1	1	St. Louis BattleHawks	Juwann Bushell-Beatty	T	Michigan	
1	2	San Antonio Brahmas	Chidi Okeke	T	Tennessee State	
1	3	Arlington Renegades	Teton Saltes	T	New Mexico	
1	4	Seattle Sea Dragons	Kai Absheer	T	FIU	
1	5	Vegas Vipers	Isaiah Williams	G	Akron	
1	6	Orlando Guardians	Eli Rogers	WR	Louisville	
1	7	DC Defenders	Davin Bellamy	DE	Georgia	
1	8	Houston Roughnecks	William Likely	CB	Maryland	
2	9	Houston Roughnecks	Derick Roberson	DE	Sam Houston State	
2	10	DC Defenders	Reggie Northrup	LB	Florida State	
2	11	Orlando Guardians	Trevon Sanders	DT	Troy	
2	12	Vegas Vipers	Destiny Vaeao	DT	Washington State	
2	13	Seattle Sea Dragons	Ryan Pope-Williams	T	San Diego State	
2	14	Arlington Renegades	Jamal Carter	CB	Miami (FL)	
2	15	San Antonio Brahmas	Kamilo Tongamoa	DT	Iowa State	
2	16	St. Louis BattleHawks	Travis Feeney	CB	Washington	
3	17	St. Louis BattleHawks	Freedom Akinmoladun	DE	Nebraska	
3	18	San Antonio Brahmas	Terry Poole	T	San Diego State	
3	19	Arlington Renegades	Donald Payne	LB	Stetson	
3	20	Seattle Sea Dragons	Jared Thomas	C	Northwestern	
3	21	Vegas Vipers	Emmanuel Beal	LB	Oklahoma	
3	22	Orlando Guardians	Tegray Scales	LB	Indiana	
3	23	DC Defenders	Liam Ryan	T	Washington State	
3	24	Houston Roughnecks	Emmanuel Ellerbee	LB	Rice	
4	25	Houston Roughnecks	John Yarbrough	T	Richmond	
4	26	DC Defenders	Josh Avery	DT	Southeast Missouri State	
4	27	Orlando Guardians	Josh Harvey-Clemons	S	Louisville	
4	28	Vegas Vipers	Cyrus Holder	WR	Duquesne	
4	29	Seattle Sea Dragons	Shareef Miller	FS	Penn State	
4	30	Arlington Renegades	George Moore	T	Oregon	
4	31	San Antonio Brahmas	Delontae Scott	DE	SMU	
4	32	St. Louis BattleHawks	Nate Meadors	CB	UCLA	
5	33	St. Louis BattleHawks	Hakeem Butler	WR	Iowa State	
5	34	San Antonio Brahmas	Mike Scott	DE	Oklahoma State	
5	35	Arlington Renegades	Aaron Adeoye	DE	Southeast Missouri State	
5	36	Seattle Sea Dragons	Clarence Hicks	LB	Texas–San Antonio	
5	37	Vegas Vipers	Matt Cohen	T	Louisville	
5	38	Orlando Guardians	Aaron Dilworth	WR	Texas A&M–Kingsville	
5	39	DC Defenders	Tyler Catalina	T	Georgia	
5	40	Houston Roughnecks	Sean Davis	CB	Maryland	
6	41	Houston Roughnecks	Sewo Olonilua	FB	TCU	
6	42	DC Defenders	Francis Bernard	LB	Utah	
6	43	Orlando Guardians	Darius Clark	RB	Newberry	
6	44	Vegas Vipers	Wes Bowers	LB	Bowie State	
6	45	Seattle Sea Dragons	Josh Gordon	WR	Baylor	
6	46	Arlington Renegades	Tomasi Laulile	DT	BYU	
6	47	San Antonio Brahmas	Sean Williams	FS	Navy	
6	48	St. Louis BattleHawks	Shakir Soto	DT	Pitt	
7	49	St. Louis BattleHawks	Chris Cooper	S	Stony Brook	
7	50	San Antonio Brahmas	Jordan McCray	C	UCF	
7	51	Arlington Renegades	Maea Teuhema	T	Southeastern Louisiana	
7	52	Seattle Sea Dragons	Tejan Koroma	C	BYU	
7	53	Vegas Vipers	Trey Dickerson	CB	Emporia State	
7	54	DC Defenders	Terrill Hanks	LB	New Mexico State	
7	55	Houston Roughnecks	James Stanley	TE	Hampton	
8	56	Houston Roughnecks	Antonio Nunn	WR	SUNY Buffalo	
8	57	DC Defenders	Markell Utsey	DT	Arkansas	
8	58	Seattle Sea Dragons	Jordan Veasy	WR	UC Berkeley	
8	59	Arlington Renegades	Deveon Smith	RB	Michigan	
8	60	San Antonio Brahmas	De'Sean Downey	LB	UMass	
8	61	St. Louis BattleHawks	Vadal Alexander	G	LSU	
9	62	St. Louis BattleHawks	Carson Wells	LB	Colorado	
9	63	San Antonio Brahmas	Cody Brown	S	Arkansas State	
9	64	Arlington Renegades	Darren Evans	CB	LSU	
9	65	Seattle Sea Dragons	Alijah Holder	FS	Stanford	
9	66	DC Defenders	Brian Herrien	RB	Georgia	
10	67	DC Defenders	Ferrod Gardner	LB	Louisiana–Lafayette	
10	68	Seattle Sea Dragons	Khalique Washington	T	Southern Miss	
10	69	Arlington Renegades	Tyler Vaughns	WR	USC	
10	70	San Antonio Brahmas	Kelvin Pinkney	DT	South Florida	
10	71	St. Louis BattleHawks	Tre Watson	LB	Maryland	
11	72	St. Louis BattleHawks	Alexander Matheson	LS	Cal Lutheran	
11	73	San Antonio Brahmas	Chase Pine	LB	Pitt	
11	74	Arlington Renegades	Colin Schooler	LB	Texas Tech	
11	75	Seattle Sea Dragons	Zech Thomas	G	Pitt State	
11	76	DC Defenders	Caliph Brice	LB	Florida Atlantic	
12	77	DC Defenders	Josh Lanier	WR	Jackson State	
12	78	Seattle Sea Dragons	Chris Rice	DE	Castleton	
12	79	Arlington Renegades	Debione Renfro	CB	Texas A&M	
12	80	San Antonio Brahmas	Ranthony Texada	CB	TCU	
12	81	St. Louis BattleHawks	Darius Bradwell	RB	Tulane	
13	82	St. Louis BattleHawks	Nyquan Murray	WR	Florida State	
13	83	San Antonio Brahmas	Deon Yelder	TE	Western Kentucky	
13	84	Arlington Renegades	Quintin Vinzant	WR	CETYS–Mexico	
13	85	Seattle Sea Dragons	Ben Beise	TE	Wisconsin–River Falls	
14	86	San Antonio Brahmas	Reggie Corbin	RB	Illinois	
14	87	St. Louis BattleHawks	Charlie Taumoepeau	TE	Portland State	
15	88	San Antonio Brahmas	Marcus Santos-Silva	TE	Texas Tech	
16	89	San Antonio Brahmas	Jordan Williams	LB	Baylor	
17	90	San Antonio Brahmas	Devin Ross	WR	Colorado	

== NFL Alumni Academy Player allocation ==
Player allocations were announced via the XFL Communications Department's Twitter page on January 6. The allocations were announced by team, rather than an order of selections. All teams were allocated ten additional players with the exceptions of the Houston Roughnecks and Vegas Vipers who were allocated nine players.

XFL team	Player	Pos.	College	Notes
Arlington Renegades	Jibri Blount	TE	NC Central	
Arlington Renegades	Raheem Bramwell	LB	Shaw	
Arlington Renegades	Kameron Brown	WR	Coastal Carolina	
Arlington Renegades	Jeremy Cox	RB	Old Dominion	
Arlington Renegades	James Fagan	T	Hampton	
Arlington Renegades	Kaleb Prejean	DT	Temple	
Arlington Renegades	Elijah Reed	SS	South Dakota	
Arlington Renegades	Mike Van Hoeven	C	Eastern Michigan	
Arlington Renegades	Chad Williams	WR	Grambling	
Arlington Renegades	Dominick Wood-Anderson	TE	Tennessee	
DC Defenders	Trae Barry	TE	Boston College	
DC Defenders	Tariq Bitson	WR	Tarleton State	
DC Defenders	Malik Fisher	DE	Villanova	
DC Defenders	Jaylen Flye-Sadler	T	Lindenwood	
DC Defenders	Lawrence Keys	T	UNC–Pembroke	
DC Defenders	Bernard McCall	TE	Livingstone	
DC Defenders	Tommy McIntyre	TE	SMU	
DC Defenders	Nydair Rouse	CB	West Chester	
DC Defenders	Shane Simpson	RB	Virginia	
DC Defenders	ArDarius Stewart	WR	Alabama	
Houston Roughnecks	Tevin Floyd	LB	Citadel	
Houston Roughnecks	Kyle Fourtenbary	TE	Northern Iowa	
Houston Roughnecks	Kenneth George	CB	Tennessee	
Houston Roughnecks	Jake Herslow	WR	Houston	
Houston Roughnecks	Ulric Jones	DT	South Carolina	
Houston Roughnecks	Antwon Kincade	S	Western Kentucky	
Houston Roughnecks	Dejoun Lee	RB	Delaware	
Houston Roughnecks	Shaquille Morris	T	Wichita State	
Houston Roughnecks	Scean Mustin	DT	Sam Houston State	
Orlando Guardians	Ja'Quain Blakely	DT	Tennessee	
Orlando Guardians	Baylen Buchanan	CB	Louisiana Tech	
Orlando Guardians	Logan Carter	TE	Oklahoma State	
Orlando Guardians	Justin Foster	DT	Samford	
Orlando Guardians	Vincent Hobbs	TE	Texas A&M–Commerce	
Orlando Guardians	Elhassan Ibrahim	CB	UC Berkeley	
Orlando Guardians	Armond Lloyd	DT	Samford	
Orlando Guardians	Deddrick Thomas	WR	Mississippi State	
Orlando Guardians	Dalyn Wade-Perry	DT	Stanford	
Orlando Guardians	Bobo Wilson	WR	Florida State	
San Antonio Brahmas	Jordan Anthony	LB	Troy	
San Antonio Brahmas	Divine Buckrham	DB	Lamar	
San Antonio Brahmas	Trayvon Hards	TE	Central Methodist	
San Antonio Brahmas	Nathaniel Hines	T	Texas Southern	
San Antonio Brahmas	Tabari Hines	WR	NC State	
San Antonio Brahmas	Camron Lewis	WR	Tarleton State	
San Antonio Brahmas	Moe Neal	RB	Syracuse	
San Antonio Brahmas	Nick Raby	DT	Southern Illinois	
San Antonio Brahmas	TyLan Shelby	DE	Louisiana–Monroe	
San Antonio Brahmas	T. J. Simmons	WR	West Virginia	
Seattle Sea Dragons	Jared Aiken	T	Winston-Salem State	
Seattle Sea Dragons	Joe Beckett	LB	Wofford	
Seattle Sea Dragons	Adam Coon	G	Michigan	
Seattle Sea Dragons	Imoni Donadelle	WR	Northwest Missouri State	
Seattle Sea Dragons	LaDarius Galloway	RB	Tennessee–Martin	
Seattle Sea Dragons	Zafir Kelly	CB	South Carolina State	
Seattle Sea Dragons	Kelvin McKnight	WR	Samford	
Seattle Sea Dragons	Howard Stephens	DT	Shorter	
Seattle Sea Dragons	Larry Tharpe	DT	Arizona	
Seattle Sea Dragons	Jamar Washington	WR	Southern	
St. Louis BattleHawks	AJ Greene	WR	New Haven	
St. Louis BattleHawks	Hezekiah Grimsley	WR	Hampton	
St. Louis BattleHawks	Marvin Moody	LB	Tulane	
St. Louis BattleHawks	Bryce Nunnelly	WR	Western Michigan	
St. Louis BattleHawks	Jakoby Pappillion	CB	Southern A&M	
St. Louis BattleHawks	Caleb Vander Esch	WR	South Dakota	
St. Louis BattleHawks	KiShawn Walker	CB	Kentucky Wesleyan	
St. Louis BattleHawks	Kareem Walker	RB	South Alabama	
St. Louis BattleHawks	Brendon White	S	Rutgers	
St. Louis BattleHawks	Jovaun Woolford	T	Rice	
Vegas Vipers	Cecil Cherry	LB	Tennessee–Martin	
Vegas Vipers	Larry Dalla Betta	TE	Webber International	
Vegas Vipers	Tyran Dixon	DT	Newberry	
Vegas Vipers	Bryant Jones	DT	Mississippi Valley State	
Vegas Vipers	Taeyler Porter	RB	Arkansas–Pine Bluff	
Vegas Vipers	Najee Reams	CB	North Carolina A&T	
Vegas Vipers	Cam Sutton	TE	Fresno State	
Vegas Vipers	Larry Williams	G	Oklahoma State	
Vegas Vipers	Jordan Wilson	TE	Florida State	
