= Terrence Magee =

American football player (born 1993)

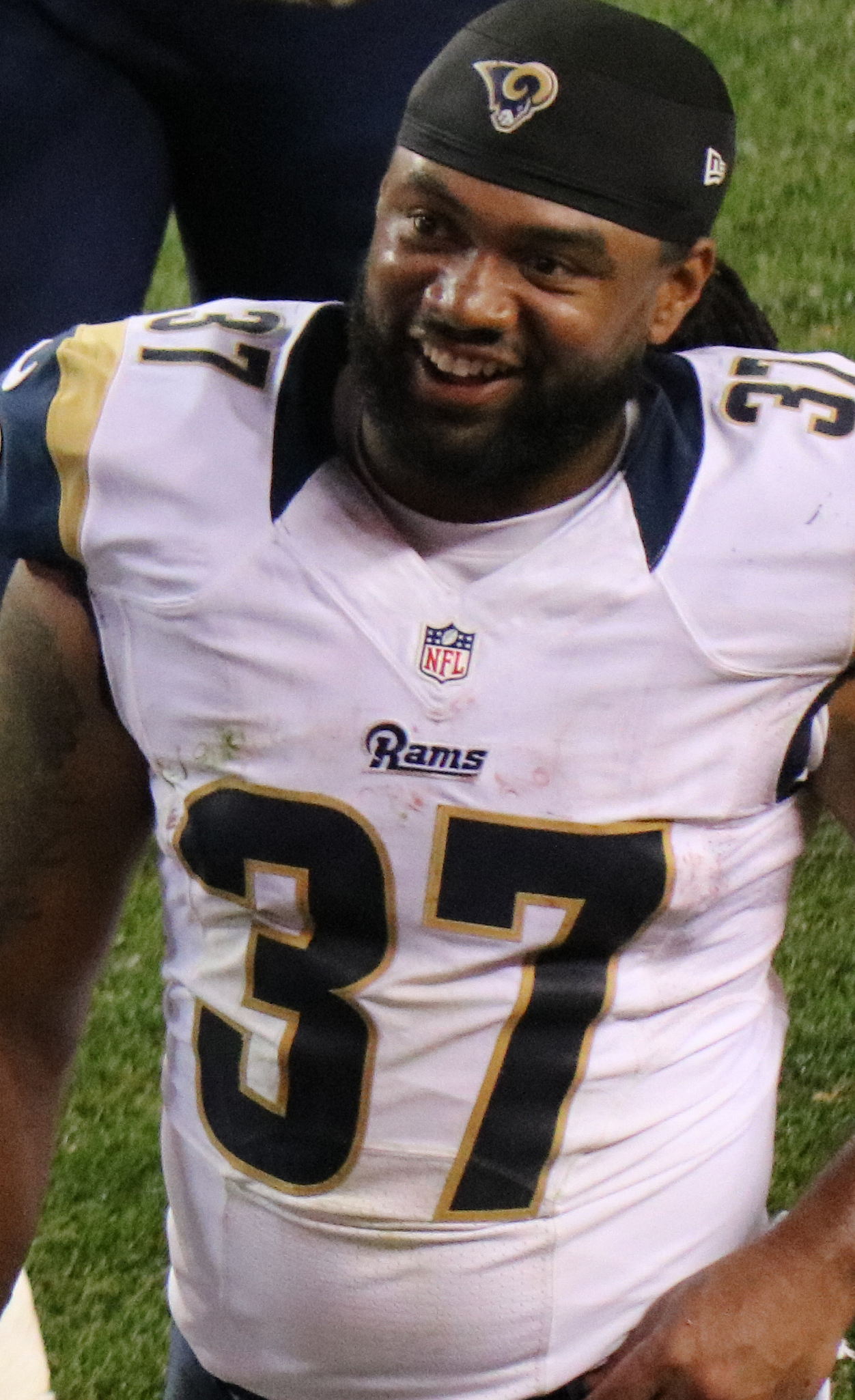
- Magee with the Los Angeles Rams in 2016

No. 30, 43, 25
- Position: Running back

Personal information
- Born: March 16, 1993 (age 33); Franklinton, Louisiana, U.S.
- Listed height: 5 ft 8 in (1.73 m)
- Listed weight: 214 lb (97 kg)

Career information
- High school: Franklinton
- College: LSU (2011–2014)
- NFL draft: 2015: undrafted

Career history
- Baltimore Ravens (2015); Los Angeles Rams (2016)*; Seattle Seahawks (2016); Cleveland Browns (2016)*; Seattle Seahawks (2016); Cleveland Browns (2017)*; Atlanta Falcons (2017); Memphis Express (2019)
- * Offseason or practice squad member only

Career NFL statistics
- Rushing attempts: 5
- Rushing yards: 17
- Receptions: 1
- Receiving yards: 2
- Stats at Pro Football Reference

Terrence Tyler Magee (born March 16, 1993) is an American former professional football player who was a running back in the National Football League (NFL). He played college football for the LSU Tigers and was signed by the Baltimore Ravens as an undrafted free agent following the 2015 NFL draft.

== Professional career ==
=== Baltimore Ravens ===
Following the 2015 NFL draft, Magee was signed by the Baltimore Ravens as an undrafted free agent. On September 5, 2015, he was released by the Ravens. On September 8, 2015, he was re-signed by the Ravens and was added to the active roster. On September 22, 2015, Magee was released by the Ravens to make room for cornerback Will Davis, who the Ravens acquired via trade. He cleared waivers and was signed to the Ravens' practice squad. On October 17, 2015, Jacobs was promoted to the 53-man roster, replacing cornerback Charles James. On October 26, 2015, Magee was waived as the Ravens promoted wide receiver Jeremy Butler. On October 28, 2015, he was re-signed to the practice squad. On November 28, 2015, he was released from practice squad. On December 2, 2015, he was re-signed to the practice squad along with wide receiver Chuck Jacobs. On December 15, 2015, the Ravens promoted Magee and cornerback Jumal Rolle to the active roster, cutting running back Raheem Mostert and placed defensive end Chris Canty on injured reserve. On May 6, 2016, the Ravens waived Magee and wide receiver Chuck Jacobs.

=== Los Angeles Rams ===
On June 7, 2016, Magee signed with the Los Angeles Rams. On September 3, 2016, he was waived by the Rams as part of final roster cuts. The next day, he was signed to the Rams' practice squad. On September 9, he was released from the Rams' practice squad.

=== Seattle Seahawks (first stint) ===
On September 21, 2016, Magee was signed to the Seahawks' practice squad. On September 24, he was promoted to the active roster. He was released by the team on September 28, 2016.

=== Cleveland Browns (first stint) ===
On October 26, 2016, Magee was signed to the Cleveland Browns' practice squad.

=== Seattle Seahawks (second stint) ===
On December 20, 2016, Magee was signed by the Seahawks off the Browns' practice squad. On May 9, 2017, he was released by the Seahawks.

=== Cleveland Browns (second stint) ===
On June 1, 2017, Magee was signed by the Browns. He was waived by the Browns on September 2, 2017 and was signed to the practice squad the next day.

=== Atlanta Falcons ===
On November 14, 2017, Magee was signed by the Atlanta Falcons off the Browns' practice squad. He was waived by the Falcons on December 4, 2017 and re-signed to the practice squad. He was promoted to the active roster on January 2, 2018.

On May 15, 2018, Magee was waived by the Falcons. He was re-signed on June 13, 2018. He was waived again on September 1, 2018.

=== Memphis Express ===
In 2019, Magee joined the Memphis Express of the Alliance of American Football. The league ceased operations in April 2019.
