= Ifedi =

Ifedi is a surname. Notable people with the surname include:

- Germain Ifedi (born 1994), American football player
- Martin Ifedi (born 1991), American football player
