= Cathedral High School (St. Cloud, Minnesota) =

- The Cathedral "Crusaders" logo

Location
- 312 7th Avenue North; St. Cloud, (Stearns County), Minnesota 56303; United States; 45°33′47″N 94°9′47″W

Information
- Funding type: Private, Coeducational
- Religious affiliation: Roman Catholic
- Established: 1884
- Principal: Kathy Crispo
- Grades: 6–12
- Enrollment: 578 (2006)
- Colors: Royal Blue and Gold
- Fight song: Fight Fight Crusaders
- Team name: Crusaders
- Accreditation: North Central Association of Colleges and Schools
- Website: https://ccsprek12.org/

Cathedral High School is a Roman Catholic coeducational parochial high school located in St. Cloud, Minnesota. One of the four high schools in the St. Cloud area, as of September 2022, Cathedral High School enrolls approximately 750 students grades 6–12. Cathedral High School employs 53 faculty members, 100% of which hold bachelor's degrees. The faculty to student ratio is 1:14. It is located in the Roman Catholic Diocese of Saint Cloud.

== History ==
Cathedral High School was established in 1902 when Sister Eleanor Irving, O.S.B. opened a 25-student coeducational school. In 1914, the administration began constructing a new building to house the school. As the school grew, in 1938 another new building (the present-day "Center Building") began construction. In 1947, the school made another addition to its campus by purchasing the "North Building" from adjacent Holy Angels church. This building later became the main Theatre for the school in 1967. Finally, the "South Building" was completed in 1958; shortly thereafter, Cathedral reached its peak enrollment of 1,621 students in 1963. The buildings have no air conditioning.

John XXIII Middle School, named after Pope John XXIII, was established in 1971 when area Catholic elementary schools, concerned about the education of their 7th and 8th grade students, suggested the upper two grades of their respective schools be consolidated. In 1982 Cathedral High School and John XXIII middle school were fused into one school with one administration. John XXIII middle school was absorbed into the high school starting in the fall of 2011. It no longer exists. There were 40 fewer incoming seventh grade students in 2013.

== Campus ==
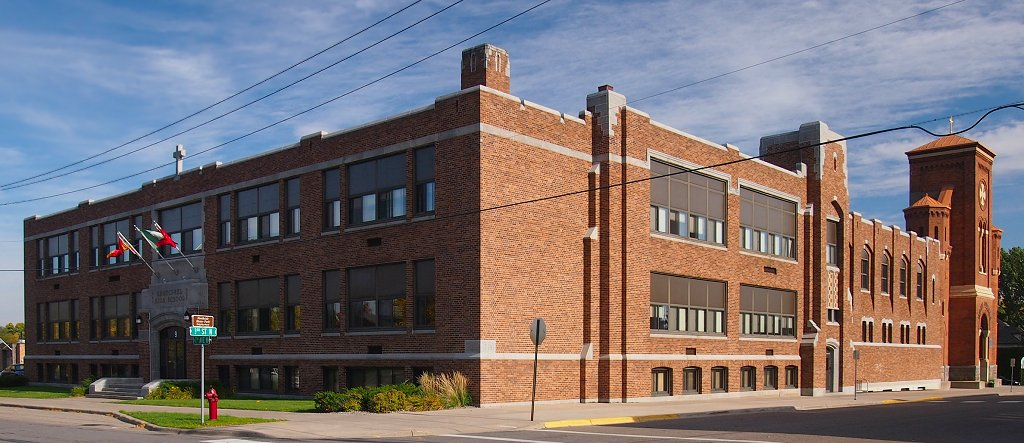
Cathedral High School from the south

The Cathedral High School/John XXIII Middle School campus consists of four buildings: the North Gymnasium, the Center Building, the South Building and the Holy Angels Performing Arts Center (HAPAC). Originally Holy Angels church, the HAPAC was converted into a performing arts center in 1995.

- North Gymnasium: houses the main athletic gymnasium for the schools and includes offices, a classroom, vending machines, locker rooms, and a weightlifting room.
- Center Building: a three-floor building housing lockers for 7th and 8th grade students; the building contains math, art, science, social studies, a computer lab, religion and English classrooms, a smaller gymnasium (primarily used by the middle school), and a science laboratory. Built in 1938, the building was designed by St. Cloud architect Nairne W. Fisher, who was also architect for St. Mary's Cathedral in St. Cloud, and at age 28, designed the Art Deco Mundelein College building in Chicago.
- South Building: a three-floor building primarily used by the high school; the building also contains 9th-12th grade student lockers, math, art, science, theology and English classrooms, another science laboratory, the cafeteria, the library, and a computer lab.
- Holy Angels Performing Arts Center, The old Holy Angels Cathedral : the first floor of this building contains the band, choir, and orchestra rehearsal rooms, while the second floor is a large theater for the school's dramatic productions, several school assemblies, and musical concerts.

Although the Center Building is the location for the Middle School lockers and the South Building the location for High School lockers, all students attend classes in both buildings.

The most interesting feature of the school's campus is its tunnel system. All of the buildings are connected by tunnels; in the cold Minnesota winter, the administration does not allow students to pass between classes outdoors. While the tunnels regularly become congested, they serve as the most efficient way to get to class on time during the winter. The tunnel system also serves as a secure way to keep the school safe from possible intruders. In the winter all entrances are closed and locked except the main entrance, which is equipped with a security camera.

Although the school grounds do not contain many athletic venues (no football field, soccer field, swimming pool, baseball/softball diamonds, tennis courts, or track), with the exception of Rau Field which is used primarily for phys. ed classes, Cathedral still has some of the best performing athletes in MN Class A (see Extracurricular Activities below). The school often uses other area high schools' venues or rents public facilities from the city.

In January 2009, Cathedral High School announced it would tear down the 119-year-old "Zardetti House", built for St. Cloud's first Bishop Otto Zardetti, and turn it into a parking lot. The building had been unused since it was declared unsafe the previous fall.

In January 2014, Anne Schleper, a Cathedral graduate, represented Team USA in women's hockey at the Olympics.

== Extra-curricular activities ==
Cathedral offers over 50 activities for its students, including all major sports and many extracurricular activities such as Knowledge Bowl, Jazz band, National Honor Society, and an annual musical theater production. There is also a CHS fishing club which does both summer and ice fishing events.

Students are also required to complete 72 hours of service within the community before graduation. Of these hours, ten of them must be through a student's parish. Other special programs that CHS offers include Campus Ministry, Link Crew, mission and language trips, and Student Ambassadors.

Cathedral's home baseball stadiums, Dick Putz Field and Joe Faber Field, located in Saint Cloud, Minnesota, are the sites of the Minnesota Class AA State High School Baseball Tournament, held in June.

== School statistics ==
=== General ===
| Statistic | Cathedral High School | State (MN) Average |
|---|---|---|
| Percentage of students of color: | 11% | 22% |
| School days in calendar year: | 172 | 175 |
| Hours in school day: | 7 | 6 |
| Number of teachers: | 60 | NA |
| Teacher to student ratio: | 1:14 | 1:16 |

=== Scholastic achievement ===
| Statistic | Cathedral High School | United States Average |
|---|---|---|
| Average ACT composite score | 24.05 | 20.09 |
| Average SAT verbal score | 627 (9% of senior class) | 507 |
| Average SAT math score | 608 | 520 |
| Average SAT writing score | 587 | 516 |

=== National Merit ===
From 2004 to 2014, 62 seniors were recognized by the National Merit Scholarship Program, including 44 commended scholars and 21 finalists.

== Trivia ==
- Film director Stephen Sommers, in his debut film, 1989's Catch Me If You Can, used Cathedral High School's campus as the setting for many scenes.

== Notable alumni ==
- Tom Burgmeier, former Major League Baseball pitcher
- Keith F. Hughes, Minnesota state senator and lawyer
- Tommy Auger, Professional football player
- Nate Schmidt, Professional American Ice Hockey Player (NHL)
- Anne Schleper, Olympic Women's Ice Hockey Player
- Austin Poganski, Professional American Ice Hockey Player (NHL)

== Resources ==
1. Privateschool.com information
2. Historic website for Cathedral High School
