= Manasseh Bailey =

American football player (born 1997)

Profile
- Position: Wide receiver

Personal information
- Born: June 27, 1997 (age 29); New York, New York, U.S.
- Listed height: 6 ft 1 in (1.85 m)
- Listed weight: 195 lb (88 kg)

Career information
- High school: Suitland (Suitland, Maryland)
- College: Morgan State
- NFL draft: 2020: undrafted

Career history
- Philadelphia Eagles (2020)*; Los Angeles Chargers (2020)*; New York Jets (2021)*; Montreal Alouettes (2021)*; Birmingham Stallions (2022); DC Defenders (2023)*; Winnipeg Blue Bombers (2023)*
- * Offseason or practice squad member only
- Stats at Pro Football Reference

Manasseh Bailey (born June 27, 1997) is an American former professional football wide receiver. He played college football at Morgan State. He has been a member of the Philadelphia Eagles, Los Angeles Chargers, and New York Jets of the National Football League (NFL), the Montreal Alouettes and Winnipeg Blue Bombers of the Canadian Football League (CFL), the DC Defenders of the XFL, and the Birmingham Stallions of the United States Football League (USFL).

== Professional career ==
=== Philadelphia Eagles ===
Bailey signed with the Philadelphia Eagles as an undrafted free agent following the 2020 NFL draft on April 26, 2020. He was waived during final roster cuts on September 3, 2020,

=== Los Angeles Chargers ===
On December 9, 2020, Bailey was signed to the Los Angeles Chargers' practice squad. On December 12, 2020, Bailey was released from the Los Angeles Chargers.

=== New York Jets ===
On January 13, 2021, Bailey signed a future contract with the New York Jets.

=== Montreal Alouettes ===
On October 9, 2021, Bailey signed with the Montreal Alouettes and was put on the Practice Squad on October 26, 2021.

=== Birmingham Stallions ===
Bailey was selected in the 17th round of the 2022 USFL draft by the Birmingham Stallions. He was released on April 22, 2022.

=== DC Defenders ===
Bailey was selected by the DC Defenders in the 2023 XFL draft.

=== Winnipeg Blue Bombers ===
On March 13, 2023, Bailey signed with the Winnipeg Blue Bombers of the Canadian Football League (CFL). On June 3, 2023, Bailey was released by the Blue Bombers.
