= Will Lewis (American football) =

American football player, coach, and executive (born 1958)

Houston Gamblers
- Title: General manager

Personal information
- Born: January 16, 1958 (age 68); Quakertown, Pennsylvania, U.S.
- Listed height: 5 ft 9 in (1.75 m)
- Listed weight: 185 lb (84 kg)

Career information
- High school: Pennridge (PA)
- College: Millersville
- NFL draft: 1980: undrafted

Career history

Playing
- Seattle Seahawks (1980–1981); Kansas City Chiefs (1981); Denver Gold (1983); Houston Gamblers (1984–1985); Ottawa Rough Riders (1986); Montreal Alouettes (1986); Ottawa Rough Riders (1986-1988); Hamilton Tiger-Cats (1989); Winnipeg Blue Bombers (1989)

Coaching
- New York/New Jersey Knights (1992) Defensive assistant coach; University of Maine (1994) Defensive secondary coach; Atlanta Falcons (1995–1996) Defensive assistant coach

Operations
- Green Bay Packers (1997) Scout; Green Bay Packers (1998) Pro personnel assistant; Seattle Seahawks (1999–2009) Director of pro personnel; Seattle Seahawks (2010–2012) Vice president of football operations; Kansas City Chiefs (2013–2017) Director of pro scouting; Memphis Express (2019) General manager; Houston Roughnecks (2020) Assistant director of pro personnel; San Antonio Brahmas (2023) Director of player personnel; Houston Roughnecks / Gamblers (2025–present) General manager

Awards and highlights
- Millersville Athletic Hall of Fame (1996)

Career NFL statistics
- Fumble recoveries: 4
- Return yards: 1,412
- Touchdowns: 1
- Stats at Pro Football Reference

Willie L. Lewis (born January 16, 1958) is an American football executive and former professional player who is the general manager for the Houston Gamblers of the United Football League (UFL). He was most recently the director of player personnel for the San Antonio Brahmas of the XFL and assistant director of pro personnel for the Houston Roughnecks of the XFL. He was the general manager for the Memphis Express of the Alliance of American Football (AAF). He previously served as an executive in the National Football League (NFL) for 20 years, including tenures with the Seattle Seahawks and Kansas City Chiefs. Most notably, he was the Seahawks vice president of football operations from 2010 to 2012.

== Playing career ==
Lewis was signed by the Seattle Seahawks as an undrafted free agent in 1980 out of Millersville State College — now Millersville University of Pennsylvania. He played in 26 NFL games, returning 45 kickoffs for a 21.4-yard average and 56 punts for an 8.0-yard average, including a 75-yard touchdown as a rookie versus the Denver Broncos. Following his NFL career, Lewis played three seasons in the United States Football League (USFL) with the Denver Gold (1983) and Houston Gamblers (1984–85). After the USFL's collapse, Lewis continued his playing career in the Canadian Football League (CFL). There he was a member of the Ottawa Roughriders (1986, 1987–88), Montreal Alouettes (1986), Hamilton Tiger-Cats (1989) and Winnipeg Blue Bombers (1989).

== Executive career ==
Lewis was hired by the Kansas City Chiefs of the National Football League on May 16, 2013.

In 2018, Lewis became the general manager of the Memphis Express of the Alliance of American Football. The following year, he was hired by the XFL's Houston Roughnecks as assistant director of pro personnel under fellow ex-AAF GM Randy Mueller.

On December 28, 2023, Lewis was out with the Brahmas after resignation from Head Coach Hines Ward.

On July 5, 2024, Lewis was hired by the Houston Roughnecks to be their new general manager.

== Personal life ==
Lewis is the father of Ryan Lewis, an XFL cornerback with the Brahmas and a cousin of ESPN analyst Louis Riddick and Robb Riddick, who is a former running back for the Buffalo Bills. Will has been married to his wife, Kimmberly, since 1993 and they have 3 grown children, Ryan, Drew and Troy. Will also has a daughter, Krysta.
