= Josh Jasper =

American gridiron football player (born 1987)

Profile
- Position: Placekicker

Personal information
- Born: November 26, 1987 (age 38); Memphis, Tennessee, U.S.
- Listed height: 5 ft 11 in (1.80 m)
- Listed weight: 170 lb (77 kg)

Career information
- High school: Ridgeway (Memphis)
- College: LSU
- NFL draft: 2011: undrafted

Career history
- Tampa Bay Buccaneers (2011)*; Toronto Argonauts (2012)*; New Orleans VooDoo (2014); Toronto Argonauts (2014)*; Memphis Express (2019)
- * Offseason or practice squad member only

Awards and highlights
- BCS national champion (2007); Consensus All-American (2010); First-team All-SEC (2010)

Career AFL statistics
- FG made: 1
- FG att: 2
- PAT made: 10
- PAT att: 16
- Tackles: 2
- Stats at ArenaFan.com

Joshua Norwood Jasper (born November 26, 1987) is an American former football placekicker. He set the Tennessee state record for career high school field goals, with 44, and his longest field goal was 54 yards. In 2010, he was a consensus All-American placekicker playing college football for the LSU Tigers in his senior year, after leading the nation with 28 field goals. He had the best placekicking percentage in LSU history as of 2011. In July 2011, the Tampa Bay Buccaneers signed him as a free agent.

== Early life ==
Jasper was born in Memphis, Tennessee. He played football and soccer at Ridgeway High School in Memphis. Originally, he was a quarterback and wide receiver, before moving over to kicker for his junior and senior years. He was rated the No. 12 kicker in the U.S. by Scout.com as a senior. His longest field goal as a high schooler was 54 yards and he set the state's record for total career field goals, with 44.

== College career ==
Jasper attended Louisiana State University, where he played for coach Les Miles's LSU Tigers football team from 2007 to 2010. He completed 47 of 56 field goal attempts as a Tiger (83.9%), the best percentage in team history, and the second best in Southeastern Conference (SEC) history.

During his junior season in 2009, he tied for the third-longest field goal in LSU history, at 52 yards. In a spring game, he kicked a 57-yard field goal. He also set a school record in September 2010 with five field goals in one game, against Mississippi State, while tying the school record of 17 kicking points in one game.

During his senior season in 2010, he led the country with twenty-eight field goals. He was recognized as a consensus first-team All-American placekicker, after receiving first-team honors from the Football Writers Association of America and Sporting News. In addition to kicking field goals, he punted as LSU's "pooch punter", kicked kickoffs, and rushed a handful of times for first downs. He was also a first-team All-SEC selection, the SEC Special Teams Player of the Week (vs. Mississippi State, vs. Ole Miss), and the Lou Groza Award Star of the Week (vs. Mississippi State, vs. Alabama, vs. UL-Monroe). He capped his career by playing in the 2011 Senior Bowl.

== Professional career ==
Despite his high school and college success, prognosticators were uncertain whether Jasper would be drafted in the April 2011 NFL draft, as in the prior five years just nine kickers were drafted. NFL draft analyst Mike Detillier opined that he might be a later-round draftee.

He was not picked in the draft. He had to wait until the NFL lockout ended before he could sign with a team as a free agent.

=== Tampa Bay Buccaneers ===
On July 26, 2011, Jasper said he had agreed to terms with the Tampa Bay Buccaneers on a rookie free agent deal. He was released on August 5.

=== Toronto Argonauts ===
On October 4, 2012, Jasper was signed by the Toronto Argonauts of the Canadian Football League. He was released by the team on October 17.

=== New Orleans VooDoo ===
On November 19, 2013, Jasper was assigned to the New Orleans VooDoo of the Arena Football League.

=== Memphis Express ===
On August 21, 2018, Jasper signed with the Memphis Express of the Alliance of American Football. He was waived on February 27, 2019.
