= Marvin Moody Jr. =

American football player (born 2000)

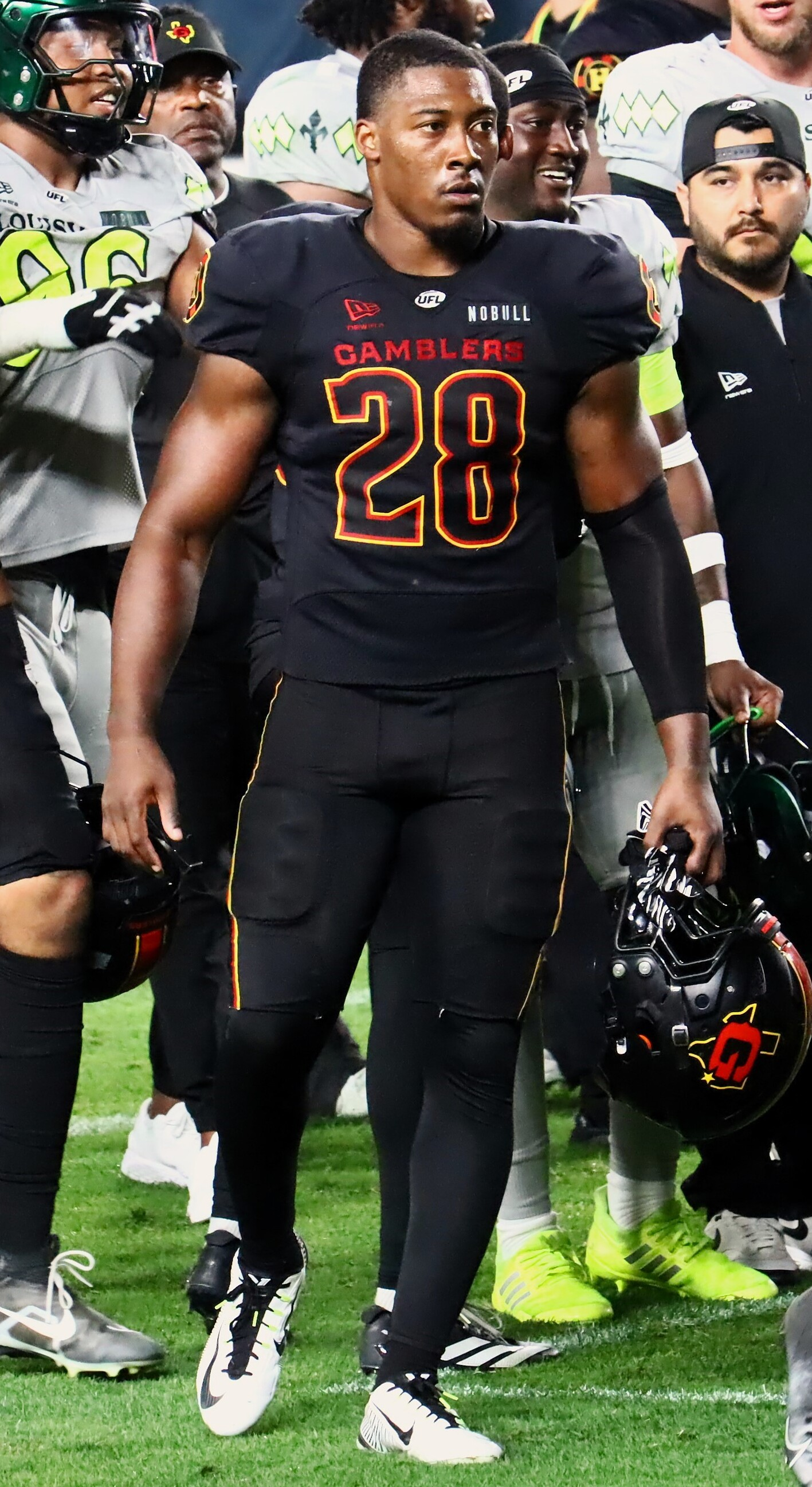
- Moody with the Houston Gamblers in 2026

No. 28 – Dallas Renegades
- Position: Linebacker
- Roster status: Active

Personal information
- Born: February 23, 1999 (age 27)
- Listed height: 6 ft 2 in (1.88 m)
- Listed weight: 230 lb (104 kg)

Career information
- High school: Bryant
- College: Tulane (2017–2021)
- NFL draft: 2022: undrafted

Career history
- Houston Roughnecks (2024); Cleveland Browns (2024)*; Houston Roughnecks (2025); Cleveland Browns (2025)*; Houston Gamblers (2026); Dallas Renegades (2027–present)
- * Offseason or practice squad member only

Marvin Moody Jr. (born February 23, 1999) is an American professional football linebacker for the Dallas Renegades of the United Football League (UFL). He played college football for the Tulane Green Wave.

== Early life ==
Moody attended Bryant High School in Arkansas. As a senior, he had 51 tackles, five tackles for loss, three sacks, a quarterback hurry and four pass breakups. Lightly recruited, he committed to Tulane over Central Arkansas.

== College career ==
As a freshman in 2017, Moody played sparingly and had five tackles in 11 games. As a junior in 2019, he had 56 tackles including 5.5 for loss and two sacks. In 2020, Moody compiled 68 tackles including 6.5 for loss. He had 39 tackles in 2021.

== Professional career ==
Moody was allocated to the St. Louis Battlehawks in the 2023 XFL draft but did not play for the team. He signed with the Houston Roughnecks on January 23, 2024. Moody had 40 tackles (26 solos, 14 assists), two tackles for loss, and one pass breakup in 10 games. He was waived on August 20, 2024.

On August 21, 2024, Moody signed with the Cleveland Browns. In one preseason game, he had two tackles. Moody was released by the Browns on August 26, 2024.

Moody was re-signed by the Roughnecks on November 2, 2024. In 2025, he recorded 65 tackles (42 solos, 23 assists), one tackle for loss, one interception for 32 yards, one touchdown, and three pass breakups in 10 games.

On August 21, 2025, Moody signed with the Cleveland Browns. On August 24, Moody was waived by the Browns.

On January 13, 2026, Moody was selected by the Houston Gamblers in the 2026 UFL draft.
