= Memphis Express =

Former professional American football team in Memphis, Tennessee

Logo

General information
- Founded: 2018
- Folded: 2019
- Colors: Red, blue & white

Personnel
- Head coach: Mike Singletary
- President: Kosha Irby

Team history
- Memphis Express (2019)

Home fields
- Liberty Bowl Memorial Stadium (2019)

League / conference affiliations
- Alliance of American Football: Eastern Conference (2019)

The Memphis Express was a professional American football franchise based in Memphis, Tennessee. It was a member of the Alliance of American Football (AAF) during its single season in 2019. They played their home games at Liberty Bowl Memorial Stadium, and were coached by former NFL player and head coach Mike Singletary.

On April 2, 2019, the league's football operations were reportedly suspended, and on April 4 the league allowed players to leave their contracts to sign with NFL teams.

== History ==
The Alliance of American Football announced the awarding of the third inaugural league team, Alliance Memphis, on May 4, 2018. This announcement was followed by the May 10, 2018, announcement of Mike Singletary as the team's head coach.

On July 30, 2018, the Alliance announced team Memphis had signed its first 29 players. On September 20, the league announced four eastern inaugural franchises' names and logos including Memphis as the Memphis Express. The name is derived from Memphis' significance as a mail and cargo transport city being the "World Headquarters" of FedEx (formerly Federal Express), with an airplane being featured in the logo. (FedEx CEO Frederick W. Smith had previously owned the Memphis Mad Dogs pro football team in the 1990s; as the AAF was a single-entity league that never progressed to selling individual franchises as originally planned, Smith had no involvement or investment with the Express, despite the use of the Express name and imagery.)

On January 5, 2019, training camp opened in San Antonio, Texas. The final 52-man roster was released on January 30. The Express' inaugural game, played against the Birmingham Iron at Legion Field on February 10, ended in a 26–0 shutout loss. Their first home game was a 20–18 loss against the Arizona Hotshots during week 2. Memphis notched their first win on March 2, with a 26–23 victory over the San Diego Fleet at Liberty Bowl Memorial Stadium.

On March 16, 2019, shortly after the Express fell to 1–5 in a 22–9 loss to the Salt Lake Stallions, the team announced they had signed Heisman Trophy winning quarterback Johnny Manziel.

On April 2, 2019, the league's football operations were suspended, and on April 4 the league allowed players to leave their contracts to sign with NFL teams. On April 17, 2019, the league announced the cessation of business operations after filing for Chapter 7 bankruptcy.

== Final roster ==
2019 Memphis Express final roster
Quarterbacks: 14 Christian Hackenberg; 2 Johnny Manziel; 12 Brandon Silvers; Running backs: 32 Kenny Hilliard; 43 Terrence Magee; 49 Anthony Manzo-Lewis; 20 Zac Stacy; Wide receivers: 18 Dontez Byrd; 19 Amir Carlisle; 15 Fabian Guerra; 17 Reece Horn; 81 Pig Howard; 83 Drew Morgan; 82 Gerrard Sheppard; 86 Dan Williams; Tight ends: 80 Brandon Barnes; 85 Cordon Moog; 89 Adrien Robinson	Offensive linemen: 68 Ty Allen G; 60 Daronte Bouldin G; 71 Christian Morris T; 70 Robert Myers G; 61 Oni Omoile G/C; 65 Demetrius Rhaney C; 67 Dallas Thomas G; 73 Logan Tuley-Tillman T; 76 Toby Weathersby T; Defensive linemen: 94 Latarius Brady DT; 90 Corey Crawford DE; 97 Greg Gilmore DT; 95 Montori Hughes DT; 93 Martin Ifedi DE; 98 Corey Vereen DE; 92 Julius Warmsley DT; 91 Jamichael Winston DE	Linebackers: 56 Freddie Bishop OLB; 58 DeMarquis Gates OLB; 54 Quentin Gause MLB; 53 Andrew Jackson MLB; 55 Davis Tull OLB; Defensive backs: 21 Terrell Bonds CB; 31 Jonathan Cook SS/FS; 39 Jeremy Cutrer CB; 24 Charles James CB; 45 Colton Jumper SS; 28 Brandon Maiden SS; 33 Justin Martin CB; 30 Channing Stribling CB; 25 Arnold Tarpley III FS; Special teams: 3 Austin MacGinnis K; 51 Ryan Navarro LS; 4 Ryan Winslow P	Reserve lists: 34 Sherman Badie RB (IR); -- Deondre Clark DE (IR); 66 Jessamen Dunker T (IR); 73 Tayo Fabuluje T (IR); -- Colin Jeter TE (IR); 96 Anthony Johnson DE (IR); 15 Devin Lucien WR (IR); 8 Zach Mettenberger QB (IR); 99 Sam Montgomery DE (IR); 77 Anthony Morris T (IR); 87 Luke Papilion TE (IR); Rights list: Jarvion Franklin RB; Taiwan Jones ILB; 52 Active, 13 Inactive

=== Allocation pool ===
The Express' assigned area, which designated player rights, included the following colleges:

Colleges

- Arkansas
- Austin Peay
- Carson–Newman
- Chattanooga
- East Tennessee State
- Kentucky
- Lane College
- LSU
- Memphis
- Middle Tennessee
- Ole Miss
- Tennessee
- Tennessee State
- Tennessee Tech
- Tusculum
- UT Martin
- Vanderbilt

National Football League (NFL)

- Cincinnati Bengals
- Indianapolis Colts
- New Orleans Saints
- Tennessee Titans

Canadian Football League (CFL)

- Winnipeg Blue Bombers

== Staff ==
Memphis Express staff
Front office: General manager – Will Lewis; Head coaches: Head coach – Mike Singletary; Offensive coaches: Offensive Coordinator/Quarterbacks – David Lee; Wide receivers – Bobby Blizzard; Offensive line – Steve Marshall	Defensive coaches: Defensive coordinator – Dennis Thurman; Defensive line – Matt Singletary; Linebackers – Pepper Johnson; Linebackers – Tom Mason; Secondary – Oshiomogho Atogwe; Quality control – Seth Gibson; Special teams coaches: Special teams coordinator/Running backs – Ty Knott

== 2019 season ==
2019 Memphis Express season
- Owner: Alliance of American Football
- General manager: Will Lewis
- Head coach: Mike Singletary
- Home stadium: Liberty Bowl Memorial Stadium

Results
- Record: 2–6
- League place: 3rd (tie), Eastern Conference

=== Final standings ===
2019 Alliance of American Football standings
Eastern Conference
Club	W–L	PCT	CONF	PF	PA	DIFF	SOS	SOV	STK
Orlando Apollos	7–1	.875	5–0	236	136	100	.406	.375	W2
Birmingham Iron	5–3	.625	3–2	165	133	32	.406	.300	W1
Memphis Express	2–6	.250	1–4	152	194	-42	.578	.500	L1
Atlanta Legends	2–6	.250	1–4	88	213	-125	.609	.438	L3
Western Conference
Club	W–L	PCT	CONF	PF	PA	DIFF	SOS	SOV	STK
San Antonio Commanders	5–3	.625	3–2	158	154	4	.516	.450	L1
Arizona Hotshots	5–3	.625	3–2	186	144	42	.469	.500	W3
San Diego Fleet	3–5	.375	2–3	158	161	-3	.469	.417	L3
Salt Lake Stallions	3–5	.375	2–3	135	143	-8	.547	.417	W1

=== Schedule ===
==== Preseason ====
Week	Date	Opponent	Result	Record	Venue
–	January 28	at Salt Lake Stallions	L 22–29	0–1	Alamodome

==== Regular season ====
Week	Date	Opponent	Result	Record	Venue
1	February 10	at Birmingham Iron	L 0–26	0–1	Legion Field
2	February 16	Arizona Hotshots	L 18–20	0–2	Liberty Bowl Memorial Stadium
3	February 23	at Orlando Apollos	L 17–21	0–3	Spectrum Stadium
4	March 2	San Diego Fleet	W 26–23	1–3	Liberty Bowl Memorial Stadium
5	March 10	at Atlanta Legends	L 20–23	1–4	Georgia State Stadium
6	March 16	at Salt Lake Stallions	L 9–22	1–5	Rice–Eccles Stadium
7	March 24	Birmingham Iron	W 31–25 (OT)	2–5	Liberty Bowl Memorial Stadium
8	March 30	Orlando Apollos	L 31–34	2–6	Liberty Bowl Memorial Stadium
9	April 6	at San Antonio Commanders	Not played		Alamodome
10	April 13	Atlanta Legends	Not played		Liberty Bowl Memorial Stadium

=== Game summaries ===
==== Week 1: at Birmingham ====
Week One: Memphis Express at Birmingham Iron – Game summary

Quarter	1	2	3	4	Total
Express	0	0	0	0	0
Iron	3	6	0	17	26

at Legion Field, Birmingham, Alabama

- Date: February 10
- Game time: 3:00 p.m. CT
- Game attendance: 17,039
- Referee: Brandon Cruse
- TV announcers (CBS Sports Network): Ben Holden, Adam Archuleta, and John Schriffen
- NoExtraPoints AAF

Game information

First Quarter

- (9:44) BIRM – Nick Novak 29-yard field goal, Iron 3–0

Second Quarter

- (10:36) BIRM – Nick Novak 28-yard field goal, Iron 6–0
- (3:21) BIRM – Nick Novak 47-yard field goal, Iron 9–0

Third Quarter
No scoring plays
Fourth Quarter

- (13:26) BIRM – Trent Richardson 4-yard rush (Luis Perez pass to Trent Richardson), Iron 17–0
- (4:17) BIRM – Nick Novak 32 yard field goal, Iron 20–0
- (1:55) BIRM – Trent Richardson 5-yard rush (rush failed), Iron 26–0

Top Passers

- MEM – Christian Hackenberg – 10/23, 87 yards, 1 INT
- BIRM – Luis Perez – 19/33, 252 yards

Top Rushers

- MEM – Zac Stacy – 12 carries, 58 yards
- BIRM – Trent Richardson – 23 carries, 58 yards, 2 TD

Top Receivers

- MEM – Alton Howard – 4 receptions, 33 yards
- BIRM – Quinton Patton – 4 receptions, 107 yards

==== Week 2: Arizona ====
Week Two: Arizona Hotshots at Memphis Express – Game summary

Quarter	1	2	3	4	Total
Hotshots	0	0	6	14	20
Express	9	3	0	6	18

at Liberty Bowl Memorial Stadium, Memphis, Tennessee

- Date: February 16
- Game time: 7:00 p.m. CT
- Game attendance: 11,980
- Referee: Reggie Smith
- TV announcers (NFL Network): Dan Hellie, Brian Billick, Mike Smith, and Jenny Dell
- NoExtraPoints AAF

Game information

First Quarter

- (8:03) MEM – Josh Jasper 38-yard field goal, Express 3–0
- (5:37) MEM – Zac Stacy 9-yard rush (rush failed), Express 9–0

Second Quarter

- (8:36) MEM – Josh Jasper 35-yard field goal, Express 12–0

Third Quarter

- (1:06) ARIZ – John Wolford 16-yard pass to Rashad Ross (pass failed), Express 12–6

Fourth Quarter

- (13:39) MEM – Christian Hackenberg 4-yard rush (pass failed), Express 18–6
- (11:31) ARIZ – Justin Stockton 45-yard rush (John Wolford rush), Express 18–14
- (7:07) ARIZ – John Wolford 4-yard pass to Tim Cook (pass failed), Hotshots 20–18

Top Passers

- ARIZ – John Wolford – 14/22, 194 yards, 2 TD, 2 INT
- MEM – Christian Hackenberg – 14/25, 102 yards

Top Rushers

- ARIZ – Tim Cook – 13 carries, 73 yards
- MEM – Zac Stacy – 19 carries, 101 yards, 1 TD

Top Receivers

- ARIZ – Josh Huff – 2 receptions, 84 yards
- MEM – Reece Horn – 5 receptions, 56 yards

==== Week 3: at Orlando ====
Week Three: Memphis Express at Orlando Apollos – Game summary

Quarter	1	2	3	4	Total
Express	0	0	6	11	17
Apollos	9	0	6	6	21

at Spectrum Stadium, Orlando, Florida

- Date: February 23
- Game time: 7:00 p.m. CT
- Game attendance: 20,394
- Referee: Jeff Heaser
- TV announcers (NFL Network): Andrew Siciliano, Steve Mariucci, Jason Fische
- NoExtraPoints AAF

Game information

First Quarter

- (13:21) ORL – D'Ernest Johnson 4-yard rush (rush failed), Apollos 6–0
- (7:37) ORL – Elliot Fry 31-yard field goal, Apollos 9–0

Second Quarter
No scoring plays
Third Quarter

- (10:05) MEM – Zach Mettenberger 30-yard pass to Devin Lucien (pass failed), Apollos 9–6
- (6:40) ORL – Garrett Gilbert 37 yard pass to Rannell Hall (pass failed), Apollos 15–6

Fourth Quarter

- (14:11) MEM – Josh Jasper 27-yard field goal, Apollos 15–9
- (9:07) ORL – Garrett Gilbert 21-yard rush (rush failed), Apollos 21–9
- (5:40) MEM – Zach Mettenberger 40-yard pass to Gerrard Sheppard (Zach Mettenberger pass to Anthony Manzo-Lewis), Apollos 21–17

Top Passers

- MEM – Zach Mettenberger – 9/12, 120 yards, 2 TD
- ORL – Garrett Gilbert – 14/28, 207 yards, TD

Top Rushers

- MEM – Sherman Badie – 8 attempts, 59 yards
- ORL – D'Ernest Johnson – 13 attempts, 79 yards

Top Receivers

- MEM – Devin Lucien – 3 receptions, 51 yards, TD
- ORL – Rannell Hall – 4 receptions, 68 yards, TD

==== Week 4: San Diego ====
Week Four: San Diego Fleet at Memphis Express – Game summary

Quarter	1	2	3	4	Total
Fleet	14	6	0	3	23
Express	3	12	0	11	26

at Liberty Bowl Memorial Stadium, Memphis, Tennessee

- Date: March 2
- Game time: 3:00 p.m. CT
- Game attendance: 13,621
- Referee: James Carter
- TV announcers (B/R Live): Mark Malone, James Jones
- NoExtraPoints AAF

Game information

First Quarter

- (12:22) SD – Ron Brooks 57-yard punt return for touchdown (rush failed), Fleet 6–0
- (3:21) MEM – Austin MacGinnis 46-yard field goal, Fleet 6–3
- (0:57) SD – Philip Nelson 6-yard pass to Dontez Ford (Terrell Watson rush), Fleet 14–3

Second Quarter

- (10:58) MEM – Austin MacGinnis 40-yard field goal, Fleet 14–6
- (5:41) SD – Alex Ross 30-yard pass to Marcus Baugh (rush failed), Fleet 20–6
- (1:55) MEM – Austin MacGinnis 35-yard field goal, Fleet 20–9
- (0:18) MEM – Zach Mettenberger 1-yard rush (pass failed), Fleet 20–15

Third Quarter
No scoring plays
Fourth Quarter

- (14:03) SD – Donny Hageman 46-yard field goal, Fleet 23–15
- (6:01) MEM – Zach Mettenberger 6-yard pass to Terrence Magee (Zach Mettenberger rush), Tied 23–23
- (2:42) MEM – Austin MacGinnis 45-yard field goal, Express 26–23

Top Passers

- SD – Philip Nelson – 9/12, 110 yards, 1 TD
- MEM – Zach Mettenberger – 18/25, 174 yards, 1 TD

Top Rushers

- SD – Terrell Watson – 10 carries, 43 yards
- MEM – Zac Stacy – 18 carries, 39 yards

Top Receivers

- SD – Dontez Ford – 3 receptions, 71 yards, 1 TD
- MEM – Reece Horn – 4 receptions, 63 yards

==== Week 5: at Atlanta ====
Week Five: Memphis Express at Atlanta Legends – Game summary

Quarter	1	2	3	4	Total
Express	6	6	8	0	20
Legends	3	11	0	9	23

at Georgia State Stadium, Atlanta, Georgia

- Date: March 10
- Game time: 3:00 p.m. CT
- Game attendance: 10,829
- Referee: Tra Blake
- TV announcers (CBS Sports Network): Ben Holden, Adam Archuleta, John Schriffen
- NoExtraPoints AAF

Game information

First Quarter

- (7:33) ATL – Younghoe Koo 38-yard field goal, Legends 3–0
- (4:55) MEM – Zac Stacy 7-yard rush (pass failed), Express 6–3

Second Quarter

- (13:25) ATL – Tarean Folston 2-yard rush (Aaron Murray pass to Justin Thomas), Legends 11–6
- (9:18) MEM – Zac Stacy 3-yard rush (pass failed), Express 12–11
- (0:00) ATL – Younghoe Koo 25-yard field goal, Legends 14–12

Third Quarter

- (3:39) MEM – Zach Mettenberger 1-yard rush (Terrence Magee rush), Express 20–14

Fourth Quarter

- (11:50) ATL – Aaron Murray 2-yard pass to Tarean Folston (pass failed), Tied 20–20
- (0:09) ATL – Younghoe Koo 35-yard field goal, Legends 23–20

Top Passers

- MEM – Zach Mettenberger – 9/17, 181 yards, 1 INT
- ATL – Aaron Murray – 27/43, 306 yards, 1 TD

Top Rushers

- MEM – Zac Stacy – 13 carries, 41 yards, 2 TD
- ATL – Tarean Folston – 11 carries, 83 yards, 1 TD

Top Receivers

- MEM – Sherman Badie – 1 reception, 56 yards
- ATL – Seantavius Jones – 5 receptions, 89 yards

==== Week 6: at Salt Lake ====
Week Six: Memphis Express at Salt Lake Stallions – Game summary

Quarter	1	2	3	4	Total
Express	0	9	0	0	9
Stallions	16	3	0	3	22

at Rice–Eccles Stadium, Salt Lake City, Utah

- Date: March 16
- Game time: 3:00 p.m. CT
- Game weather: Sunny • Temperature: 47 °F (8 °C) • Wind: 5–10 mph
- Game attendance: 8,150
- Referee: Reggie Smith
- TV announcers (B/R Live): Mark Malone, Marvin Lewis, Maurice Jones-Drew
- NoExtraPoints AAF

Game information

First Quarter

- (9:18) SL – Josh Woodrum 11-yard pass to Nick Truesdell (Josh Woodrum pass to Jordan Leslie), Stallions 8–0
- (0:40) SL – Josh Woodrum 14-yard pass to Anthony Denham (Josh Woodrum pass to Terrell Newby), Stallions 16–0

Second Quarter

- (11:07) SL – Taylor Bertolet 26-yard field goal, Stallions 19–0
- (7:15) MEM – Austin MacGinnis 31-yard field goal, Stallions 19–3
- (1:54) MEM – Brandon Silvers 11-yard pass to Zac Stacy (pass failed), Stallions 19–9

Third Quarter
No scoring plays
Fourth Quarter

- (11:57) SL – Taylor Bertolet 22-yard field goal, Stallions 22–9

Top Passers

- MEM – Brandon Silvers – 23/37, 242 yards, 1 TD
- SL – Josh Woodrum – 24/37, 243 yards, 2 TD, 1 INT

Top Rushers

- MEM – Zac Stacy – 11 carries, 31 yards
- SL – Joel Bouagnon – 19 carries, 60 yards

Top Receivers

- MEM – Reece Horn – 8 receptions, 129 yards
- SL – Nick Truesdell – 5 receptions, 67 yards, 1 TD

==== Week 7: Birmingham ====
Week Seven: Birmingham Iron at Memphis Express – Game summary

Quarter	1	2	3	4	OT	Total
Iron	8	8	3	6	0	25
Express	0	8	6	11	6	31

at Liberty Bowl Memorial Stadium, Memphis, Tennessee

- Date: March 24
- Game time: 7:00 p.m. CT
- Game weather: Cloudy • Temperature: 71 °F (22 °C) • Wind: 13 mph
- Game attendance: 13,758
- Referee: Tra Blake
- TV announcers (NFL Network): Matt "Money" Smith, Marvin Lewis
- NoExtraPoints AAF

Game information

First Quarter

- (6:18) BIRM – Luis Perez 11-yard pass to Braedon Bowman (Trent Richardson rush), Iron 8–0

Second Quarter

- (14:56) MEM – Terrence Magee 1-yard rush (Brandon Silvers pass to Dan Williams), Tied 8–8
- (13:44) BIRM – Trent Richardson 1-yard rush (Trent Richardson rush), Iron 16–8

Third Quarter

- (9:04) BIRM – Nick Novak 28-yard field goal, Iron 19–8
- (3:54) MEM – Blocked punt returned 50 yards for touchdown by Terrell Bonds (pass failed), Iron 19–14

Fourth Quarter

- (9:01) BIRM – Luis Perez 4-yard pass to Wes Saxton (pass failed), Iron 25–14
- (4:16) MEM – Austin MacGinnis 22-yard field goal, Iron 25–17
- (0:24) MEM – Brandon Silvers 7-yard pass to Reece Horn (Brandon Silvers pass to Brandon Barnes), Tied 25–25

Overtime

- MEM – Brandon Silvers 10-yard pass to Dan Williams, Express 31–25

Top Passers

- BIRM – Luis Perez – 16/37, 235 yards, 2 TD
- MEM – Brandon Silvers – 24/35, 266 yards, 2 TD

Top Rushers

- BIRM – Trent Richardson – 16 carries, 56 yards, 1 TD
- MEM – Johnny Manziel – 2 carries, 20 yards

Top Receivers

- BIRM – Amba Etta-Tawo – 3 receptions, 71 yards
- MEM – Reece Horn – 7 receptions, 113 yards, 1 TD

This was the first overtime game in AAF history. Despite newly signed quarterback Johnny Manziel playing a few series for the Express, starter Brandon Silvers led the team to a comeback victory, keeping its slim postseason chances alive.

==== Week 8: Orlando ====
Week Eight: Orlando Apollos at Memphis Express – Game summary

Quarter	1	2	3	4	Total
Apollos	3	11	8	12	34
Express	0	9	14	8	31

at Liberty Bowl Memorial Stadium, Memphis, Tennessee

- Date: March 30
- Game time: 1:00 p.m. CT
- Game attendance: 12,417
- Referee: Reggie Smith
- TV announcers (TNT): Dan Hellie, Brock Huard
- NoExtraPoints AAF

Game information

First Quarter

- (9:30) ORL – Elliott Fry 25-yard field goal, Apollos 3–0

Second Quarter

- (12:52) ORL – Elliott Fry 37-yard field goal, Apollos 6–0
- (8:45) MEM – Austin MacGinnis 51-yard field goal, Apollos 6–3
- (6:55) MEM – Austin MacGinnis 29-yard field goal, Tied 6–6
- (1:55) ORL – D'Ernest Johnson 3-yard rush (D'Ernest Johnson rush), Apollos 14–6
- (0:09) MEM – Austin MacGinnis 34-yard field goal, Apollos 14–9

Third Quarter

- (13:54) ORL – Garrett Gilbert 65-yard pass to Donteea Dye (Garrett Gilbert pass to Chris Thompson), Apollos 22–9
- (8:13) MEM – Terrence Magee 2-yard rush (Brandon Silvers pass to Dontez Byrd), Apollos 22–17
- (2:36) MEM – Cory Crawford 7-yard fumble return (pass failed), Express 23–22

Fourth Quarter

- (8:23) MEM – Brandon Silvers 9-yard pass to Dontez Byrd (Garrett Gilbert pass to Gerrard Sheppard), Express 31–22
- (4:59) ORL – Garrett Gilbert 18-yard pass to Charles Johnson (pass failed), Express 31–28
- (1:51) ORL – De'Veon Smith 1-yard rush (rush failed), Apollos 34–31

Top Passers

- ORL – Garrett Gilbert – 22/40, 310 yards, 2 TD, 2 INT
- MEM – Brandon Silvers – 30/49, 269 yards, 1 TD, 1 INT

Top Rushers

- ORL – De'Veon Smith – 10 carries, 27 yards, 1 TD
- MEM – Terrence Magee – 9 carries, 39 yards, 1 TD

Top Receivers

- ORL – Charles Johnson – 8 receptions, 135 yards, 1 TD
- MEM – Gerrard Sheppard – 9 receptions, 98 yards

== Media ==
In addition to league-wide television coverage through NFL Network, CBS Sports Network, TNT, and B/R Live, Memphis' games were also broadcast on local radio by KWNW, an iHeartMedia station branded as 101.9 Kiss FM.
