= 2011 Senior Bowl =

2011 Under Armour Senior Bowl
- 62nd Senior Bowl
North Team	South Team
10	24
Head coach: Marvin Lewis (Cincinnati Bengals)	Head coach: Chan Gailey (Buffalo Bills)
	1	2	3	4	Total
North	0	0	10	0	10
South	10	7	0	7	24
- Date: January 29, 2011
- Season: 2010
- Stadium: Ladd–Peebles Stadium
- Location: Mobile, Alabama
- MVP: Christian Ponder
- Referee: John McDaid
- Attendance: 40,646

United States TV coverage
- Network: NFL Network

The 2011 Senior Bowl was an all-star college football exhibition game featuring players from the 2010 college football season, and prospects for the 2011 draft of the professional National Football League (NFL). The 62nd edition of the Senior Bowl was won by the South team, 24–10.

The game was played on January 29, 2011, at 3 pm CST (4 p.m. Eastern time) at Ladd–Peebles Stadium in Mobile, Alabama, between "North" and "South" teams. The coaching staff of the Cincinnati Bengals, led by head coach Marvin Lewis, coached the North team. The coaching staff of the Buffalo Bills, led by head coach Chan Gailey, coached the South team.

Coverage of the event was in high-definition on the NFL Network. Clothing company Under Armour sponsored the game for the fifth consecutive year and provided apparel for the game.

For the South team, quarterback Christian Ponder, formerly with Florida State, threw 132 yards and two touchdowns and was named the Most Valuable Player. Leonard Hankerson, former Miami Hurricanes wide receiver, had five catches for 100 yards and one touchdown. He was named the Under Armour Offensive Player of the Game.

== Game summary ==
=== Scoring summary ===
Scoring Play	Score
1st Quarter
SOUTH - Josh Jasper 23-yard field goal, 09:57	SOUTH 3 - 0
SOUTH - Leonard Hankerson 18-yard pass from Christian Ponder (Josh Jasper kick), 02:14	SOUTH 10 - 0
2nd Quarter
SOUTH - Noel Devine 1-yard run (Josh Jasper kick), 04:05	SOUTH 17 - 0
3rd Quarter
NORTH - Kai Forbath 24-yard field goal, 05:09	SOUTH 17 - 3
NORTH - Da'Rel Scott 1-yard run (Alex Henery kick), 00:19	SOUTH 17 - 10
4th Quarter
SOUTH - Jeremy Kerley 23-yard pass from Christian Ponder (Josh Jasper kick), 03:04	SOUTH 24 - 10

=== Statistics ===
Statistics	North	South
First downs	13	20
Total offense, plays - yards	50-238	71-317
Rushes-yards (net)	19-0	43-127
Passing yards (net)	238	190
Passes, Att-Comp-Int	31-17-1	28-15-0
Time of Possession	24:02	35:58
