= Gerrard Sheppard =

American gridiron football player (born 1990)

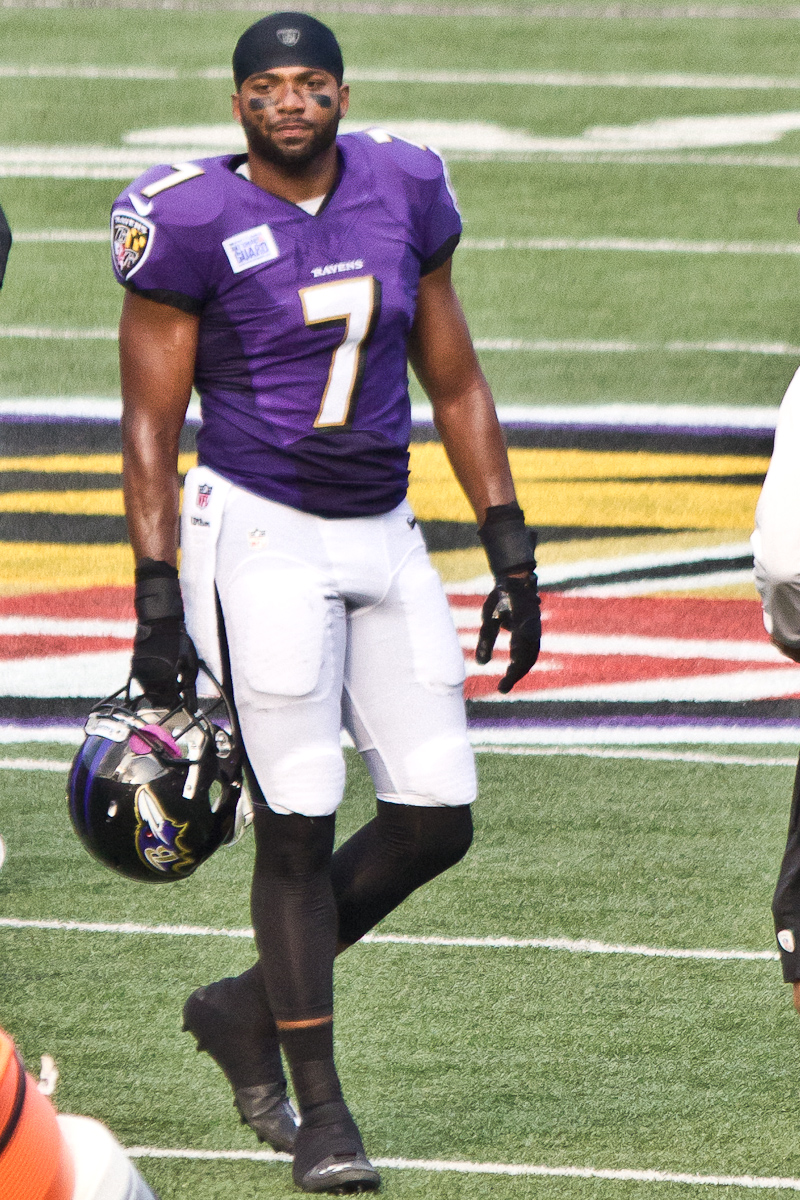
- Sheppard with the Ravens in 2013

No. 7, 9, 13, 82, 88
- Position: Wide receiver

Personal information
- Born: November 16, 1990 (age 35); Owings Mills, Maryland, U.S.
- Listed height: 6 ft 2 in (1.88 m)
- Listed weight: 210 lb (95 kg)

Career information
- College: Towson
- NFL draft: 2013: undrafted

Career history
- Baltimore Ravens (2013–2014)*; Green Bay Packers (2014)*; Winnipeg Blue Bombers (2016–2017); Memphis Express (2019)
- * Offseason or practice squad member only
- Stats at Pro Football Reference

Gerrard Sheppard (born November 16, 1990) is an American former football wide receiver. He played college football at Towson.

== Early life ==
He attended McDonogh High School. He was named to the first-team All-Metro team in his senior year in high school. He also named to the first-team All-State team.

== College career ==
He played only eight games at Connecticut in 2010 and played in the Tostito’s Fiesta Bowl against the Oklahoma Sooners.

He then transferred to Towson, where he played in every game in 2011 season as a backup wide receiver and was the team's third leading receiver for the season.

== Professional career ==
On April 27, 2013, he signed with the Baltimore Ravens as an undrafted free agent. On August 25, 2013, he was waived by the Ravens but was later added to their practice squad on September 2.

In 2019, Sheppard joined the Memphis Express of the Alliance of American Football, but failed to make the final roster. He was re-signed on February 13, 2019. The league ceased operations in April 2019.

== Personal life ==
In 2017, Sheppard and his sister Shanae launched Sunset Raw Juice Bar, which has locations in Owings Mills and Fulton.
