= Keith F. Hughes =

American politician and lawyer (1936–2021)

Keith F. Hughes (July 27, 1936 – September 21, 2021) was an American politician and lawyer.

Hughes was born in St. Cloud, Minnesota and graduated the Cathedral High School in St. Cloud. Hughes served in the Reserve Officers' Training Corps while going to college and then served in the Minnesota National Guard. He received his bachelor's degree from College of Saint Benedict and Saint John's University in Collegeville, Minnesota and his law degree from University of Minnesota Law School. He practiced law in St. Cloud and lived with his wife and family in St. Cloud. Hughes served in the Minnesota Senate from 1965 to 1972. Hughes died at the St. Cloud Hospital in St. Cloud, Minnesota.
