= Martin Ifedi =

American football player (born 1991)

No. 96, 71, 67, 98, 93, 58
- Position: Defensive end

Personal information
- Born: September 4, 1991 (age 35); Houston, Texas, U.S.
- Listed height: 6 ft 3 in (1.91 m)
- Listed weight: 275 lb (125 kg)

Career information
- High school: Houston (TX) Westside
- College: Memphis
- NFL draft: 2015: 7th round, 227th overall pick

Career history
- St. Louis Rams (2015)*; Tampa Bay Buccaneers (2015–2016)*; Atlanta Falcons (2016–2017); Memphis Express (2019); Seattle Dragons (2020)*; Team 9 (2020)*; Seattle Dragons (2020)
- * Offseason or practice squad member only

Awards and highlights
- Second-team All-C-USA (2012)
- Stats at Pro Football Reference

Martin Ndubuisi Ifedi (born September 4, 1991) is an American former professional football defensive end. He played college football at Memphis.

== Professional career ==
Pre-draft measurables
Height	Weight	Arm length	Hand span	40-yard dash	10-yard split	20-yard split	20-yard shuttle	Three-cone drill	Vertical jump	Broad jump	Bench press
6 ft 3 1/8 in (1.91 m)	275 lb (125 kg)	33 7/8 in (0.86 m)	10 in (0.25 m)	4.88 s	1.68 s	2.83 s	4.58 s	7.39 s	31.0 in (0.79 m)	9 ft 3 in (2.82 m)	17 reps

=== St. Louis Rams ===
Ifedi was selected in the seventh round, 227th overall, by the St. Louis Rams in the 2015 NFL draft. He was released by the team on September 5, 2015.

=== Tampa Bay Buccaneers ===
On November 10, 2015, Ifedi was signed to the practice squad of the Tampa Bay Buccaneers. He was released on May 10, 2016, but was re-signed August 5, 2016. On August 28, 2016, he was waived by the Buccaneers.

=== Atlanta Falcons ===
On December 27, 2016, Ifedi was signed to the Atlanta Falcons' practice squad. He signed a reserve/future contract with the Falcons on February 7, 2017. On April 30, 2017, he was waived by the Falcons. He re-signed with the Falcons on June 13, 2017. He was waived/injured on September 2, 2017, and placed on injured reserve. Ifedi was waived on April 10, 2018.

=== Memphis Express ===
In 2018, Ifedi signed with the Memphis Express of the Alliance of American Football for the 2019 season. However, he was placed on injured reserve before the start of the regular season, and waived on March 4, 2019. He was added to the team's rights list and re-signed to a contract on March 19. He was activated to the team's roster on March 20. He was placed on injured reserve on April 1. The league ceased operations in April 2019.

=== Seattle Dragons ===
In October 2019, Ifedi was picked up by the Seattle Dragons of the XFL during the 2020 XFL draft's open phase. He signed a contract with the team on January 8, 2020. He was waived during final roster cuts on January 22, 2020. He was signed to the XFL's practice squad team, referred to as Team 9, on January 30, 2020. Ifedi was re-signed by the Dragons on March 9, 2020. He had his contract terminated when the league suspended operations on April 10, 2020.

== Personal life ==
Ifedi is also a member of the Kappa Eta (ΚΗ) chapter of Alpha Phi Alpha fraternity. His younger brother, Germain, plays for the Cleveland Browns.
