= Dontez Byrd =

American gridiron football player (born 1995)

Nicholls Colonels
- Title: Wide receivers coach

Personal information
- Born: August 9, 1995 (age 31); Louisville, Kentucky, U.S.
- Listed height: 5 ft 11 in (1.80 m)
- Listed weight: 180 lb (82 kg)

Career information
- High school: Ballard (Louisville, Kentucky)
- College: Tennessee Tech
- NFL draft: 2018: undrafted

Career history

Playing
- Atlanta Falcons (2018)*; Memphis Express (2019); Seattle Dragons (2020); Hamilton Tiger-Cats (2020–2021)*; Massachusetts Pirates (2021); Orlando Guardians (2023)
- * Offseason or practice squad member only

Coaching
- Western Kentucky (2023–2024) Offensive quality control coach; Tulsa (2025) Offensive analyst; Nicholls (2026–present) Wide receivers coach

Awards and highlights
- United Bowl champion (2021)

Dontez Byrd (born August 9, 1995) is an American college football coach and former professional wide receiver. He is the wide receivers coach for Nicholls State University, a position he received January 2026. He played college football at the University of Louisville and Tennessee Tech University. He was signed by the Atlanta Falcons as an undrafted free agent after the 2018 NFL draft.

== College career ==
=== Louisville ===
Byrd graduated from Ballard High School in Louisville, Kentucky, with zero scholarship offers to play collegiate football. Byrd was a walk-on at the University of Louisville and played 23 games at Louisville between 2013 and 2015 where mostly played special teams.

=== Tennessee Tech ===
Byrd transferred from Louisville to Tennessee Tech on February 4, 2016. Byrd played 22 games at Tennessee Tech and hauled in 152 catches for 1,936 receiving yards and 13 touchdowns between 2016 and 2017.

== Professional career ==
=== Atlanta Falcons ===
Byrd signed with the Atlanta Falcons as an undrafted free agent on April 18, 2018. He was released on September 1, 2018.

=== Memphis Express ===
Prior to the inaugural Alliance of American Football Season, Byrd signed with the Memphis Express. Byrd played six game for Memphis and had 10 catches for 136 receiving and one touchdown. The AAF ceased operations on April 2, 2019, with all player contracts being terminated with two scheduled games left in the season.

=== Seattle Dragons ===
On January 14, 2020, Byrd signed with the Seattle Dragons of the XFL. Byrd played five games for Seattle and had five catches for 44 yards. The XFL cancelled the rest of the 2020 Season with five scheduled games left due to the COVID-19 pandemic and later suspended league operations and terminated staff and player contracts.

=== Hamilton Tiger-Cats ===
Byrd signed with the Hamilton Tiger-Cats of the CFL on April 19, 2020. After the 2020 CFL season was cancelled, Byrd opted out of his contract on August 31, 2020. Byrd was re-signed on December 10, 2020, and was released June 23, 2021.

=== Massachusetts Pirates ===
Byrd signed with the Massachusetts Pirates of the IFL on June 29, 2021. Byrd played 10 games for the Pirates and had 20 catches for 262 yards and three touchdowns. Byrd helped lead the Pirate to their first ever IFL United Bowl championship win, in which he had three catches for 23 yards.

=== Orlando Guardians ===
On November 17, 2022, Byrd was drafted by the Orlando Guardians of the XFL.
