= Tommy Auger =

American football player (born 1996)

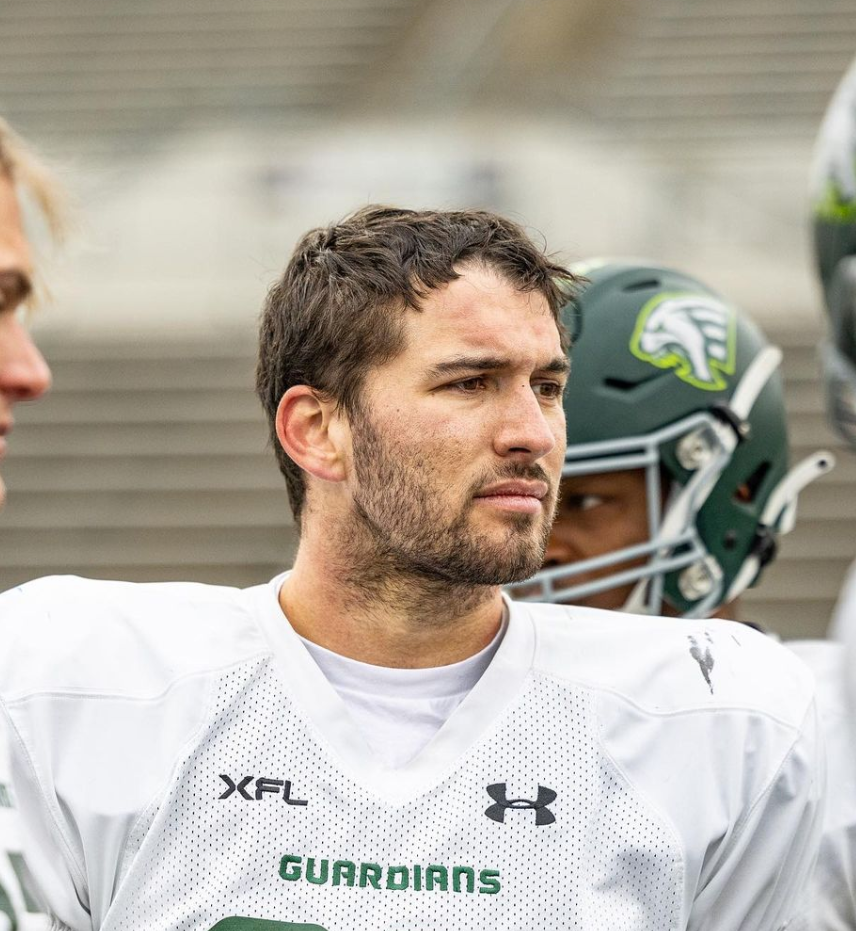
- Auger with the Orlando Guardians in 2023

No. 39 – Osos de Monterrey
- Position: Tight end

Personal information
- Born: December 12, 1996 (age 29)
- Listed height: 6 ft 4 in (1.93 m)
- Listed weight: 245 lb (111 kg)

Career information
- High school: Cathedral High School (MN)
- College: St. John's University (MN)

Career history
- Cineplexx Blue Devils (2021); FCF Bored Apes (2022); Orlando Guardians (2023); Fundidores de Monterrey (2023–2024); IBM Big Blue (2025); Osos de Monterrey (2025-present)

Awards and highlights
- AFCA All-American (2018); FCF All-Pro (2022); 4x LFA All-Pro (2023, 2024, 2025, 2026); LFA records: TE Single-Season Receptions: 65 (2023); TE Single-Season Yards: 694 (2023); TE Single-Season TDs: 7 (2024)

Tommy Auger (born December 12, 1996) is an American football tight end who plays for the Osos de Monterrey in the Liga de Futbol Americano Profesional. He played college football for the St. John's Johnnies from 2015 to 2019.

== Early life ==
Auger attended Cathedral High School in St. Cloud, Minnesota. As a senior, he led the state of Minnesota in receptions with 90, also adding 927 yards receiving and 5 touchdowns. Including 30 receptions for 307 yards in the section playoffs, which were 1st and 2nd respectively in the state. Auger is named multiple times in the Minnesota State High School League record book. In the state of Minnesota, he is 1st in single-season receptions (90), 3rd & 7th in single-game receptions (15 & 14), 4th in career receptions (142), 6th in career solo tackles (180), and 10th in career receiving yards (1606). On November 25, 2014, Auger was named to the Associated Press All-State football team alongside future NFL players Ben Ellefson, Jesper Horsted, Blake Cashman, and Carter Coughlin. On April 7, 2015, Auger was named a Minnesota High School Scholar Athlete award winner by the National Football Foundation.

== College career ==
Auger spent his four years at St. John's University in Collegeville, Minnesota, playing both college football and college baseball. During his freshman year, Auger appeared in all 12 games for the Johnnies playing mostly on special teams. The following year as a sophomore, Auger earned the starting spot at tight end and was fourth on the team in receptions (16) and fifth in receiving yards (268). On November 5, 2016, Auger had a season-high 5 receptions for 95 yards against MIAC opponent Hamline University. As a junior, Auger had 11 catches for 139 yards and 2 touchdowns. As a senior, Auger earned first team All-MIAC and second team All-American at the tight end position. He finished the season with 26 catches for 303 yards and 7 touchdowns. Auger ended his career at St. John's with 53 catches for 710 yards and 9 touchdowns.

== Professional career ==
=== Cineplexx Blue Devils ===
In December 2020, Auger signed a contract to play with the Cineplexx Blue Devils in Hohenems, Austria. The Blue Devils played in the second highest tier of the Austrian Football League. The 2021 season in Austria was shortened to 6 games to avoid the spread of COVID-19. In the six game season, Auger led the division in receptions (38), receiving yards (654) and receiving touchdowns (8). The Blue Devils ended the season 2-4 and missed the 2021 playoffs.

=== Fan Controlled Football ===
On January 21, 2022, Auger signed with the Fan Controlled Football league. The 2022 season of Fan Controlled Football featured players such as Heisman Trophy winner, Johnny Manziel and NFL Hall of Famer, Terrell Owens. Auger played on the Bored Apes who entered the playoffs as the top seed and lost in the People's Championship to the Zappers led by Kelly Bryant. Auger was named to FCF All-Pro as the first team tight end as voted on by the players of the league.

=== Orlando Guardians ===
On November 17, 2022, Auger was drafted by the Orlando Guardians of the XFL. He was drafted as a TE/LS in the second round of the specialist portion of the draft. On November 26, Auger was listed as one of the top 10 prospects for the Guardians for the 2023 season. On February 9, 2023, Auger was released from the Guardians during final cuts.

=== Monterrey Fundidores/Osos ===
On February 17, 2023, Auger signed with the Monterrey Fundidores of Liga de Futbol Americano Profesional (LFA). Auger ended the 2023 regular season and playoffs with 65 receptions for 694 receiving yards and 5 touchdowns, leading all LFA tight ends in those categories. Auger also broke the LFA single-season tight end records for receptions (54), receiving yards (584) and touchdowns (4) in the regular season. On February 21, 2024, Auger was named to the 2023 LFA All-Pro team.

On December 14, 2023, Auger re-signed with the Fundidores for the 2024 season. Auger ended the 2024 regular season and playoffs with 42 receptions for 552 yards and 7 touchdowns, leading all LFA tight ends in those categories. The seven touchdown broke his own tight end receiving touchdowns record from the previous season. On May 1, 2025, Auger was named to the 2024 LFA All-Pro team.

On March 14, 2025, Auger re-signed with the Monterrey team, now re-branded to Osos, for the 2025 season. Auger ended the 2025 regular season and playoffs with 40 receptions for 527 receiving yards and four touchdowns, leading all LFA tight ends in those categories. The Osos ended their season in a 13-12 loss to the Mexicas de la Ciudad de México in Tazón México VIII.

On March 25, 2026, Auger re-signed for another season in Monterrey. He ended the 2026 season with 35 receptions for 357 yards and 5 touchdowns, leading all LFA tight ends in those categories. The Osos ended their season in 24-12 loss to the Caudillos de Chihuahua in Taz ón Mexico IX.

Auger is the all-time record holder among LFA tight ends for receptions, receiving yards and touchdowns. Among all LFA receivers, he ranks 3rd all-time in receptions, 4th all-time in receiving yards and 4th all-time in touchdowns.

=== IBM Big Blue ===
On July 21, 2025, Auger signed with IBM Big Blue of the X-League in Japan. He ended the 2025 season 43 receptions for 461 yards and 5 touchdowns, leading X-League tight ends in each category.
