= Divine Buckrham =

American gridiron football player (born 1999)

No. 11 – Munich Ravens
- Position: Safety
- Roster status: Active

Personal information
- Born: December 5, 1999 (age 26)
- Listed height: 6 ft 0 in (1.83 m)
- Listed weight: 194 lb (88 kg)

Career information
- High school: The Kiski School (Saltsburg, Pennsylvania)
- College: Lehigh (2017–2020); Lamar (2021)
- NFL draft: 2022: undrafted

Career history
- Potsdam Royals (2022); San Antonio Brahmas (2023); Raiders Tirol (2023); Frankfurt Galaxy (2024); Vienna Vikings (2025); Munich Ravens (2026–present)

Awards and highlights
- GFL North Champion (2022)

Divine Buckrham (born December 5, 1999) is an American football defensive back for the Munich Ravens of the European Football Alliance (EFA). He played college football for the Lehigh Mountain Hawks and the Lamar Cardinals.

== Early life and high school ==
Buckrham attended The Kiski School in Saltsburg, Pennsylvania, where he served as team captain for two years and also participated in wrestling and track and field. During his high school career, the Cougars consistently won the Centennial Cup. At the end of his high school career, he represented an American select team in a game against a local Shanghai football club, earning the title of Offensive MVP.

== College career ==
=== Lehigh ===
In 2017, Buckrham committed to play college football at Lehigh University, where he primarily played in the secondary. He earned a spot in the startling lineup during his rookie season, holding down the "Rover" position for the final five games. That year, the Mountain Hawks shared the Patriot League championship title. Starting in the 2019 season, During his senior season (which was postponed to the spring of 2021 due to the COVID-19 pandemic), he served as team captain but appeared in only the first game due to an injury. Over the course of 34 games for the Mountain Hawks, he recorded a total of 95 tackles and three pass breakups. He received several honors in 2021 including the Patriot League's Award of Outstanding Leadership and Character and his university's Barry Fetterman Award which recognizes his loyalty, selflessness and his dedication to Lehigh football. Additionally, he received the James J. Duane III Student Life Leadership Award, the Ujima Award and the Student Senate Leadership Award.

=== Lamar ===
For the 2021 season, Buckrham transferred to Lamar University. There, he was a key part of the Cardinals' defense, recording 52 tackles, an interception and eight pass break-ups in eleven games.

== Professional career ==
In May 2022, Buckrham participated in a Pittsburgh Steelers rookie minicamp. but was not signed afterwards.

=== Potsdame Royals ===
Buckrham would sign a contract with the Potsdam Royals of the German Football League (GFL). He played in twelve games for the Royals, helping the team win the Northern Division title with 73 tackles, three interceptions and seven pass break-ups. They were defeated by the Schwäbisch Hall Unicorns in the German Bowl.

=== San Antonio Brahmas ===
Buckrham was on the San Antonio Brahmas' roster during the 2023 XFL season, where he played in six games.

=== Raiders Tirol ===
Shortly after the conclusion of the XFL regular season, he was announced as a signee for the Raiders Tirol of the European League of Football (ELF). Buckrham played in all twelve games for the Innsbruck-based franchise. He led the team with three interceptions. Additionally, he recorded 58 tackles and broke up nine passes, but would miss out on the playoffs with the Raiders.

=== Frankfurt Galaxy ===
Buckrham signed to play for the Frankfurt Galaxy for the 2024 ELF season.

=== Vienna Vikings ===
On January 19, 2025, Buckrham signed to play for the Vienna Vikings.

=== Munich Ravens ===
Buckrham signed to play for the Munich Ravens in 2026.

== Personal life ==
Buckrham has two brothers and two sisters. In addition to English, he also speaks Chinese.
