= Chuck Jacobs =

American gridiron football player (born 1990)

No. 17
- Position: Wide receiver / Specialist

Personal information
- Born: May 11, 1990 (age 36); San Francisco, California, U.S.
- Listed height: 6 ft 0 in (1.83 m)
- Listed weight: 178 lb (81 kg)

Career information
- High school: John F. Kennedy (Richmond, California)
- College: Laney (2009–2010); Utah State (2011–2012)
- NFL draft: 2013: undrafted

Career history
- San Francisco 49ers (2013–2014); Baltimore Ravens (2015); Toronto Argonauts (2017)

Awards and highlights
- Second-team All-WAC (2012)
- Stats at Pro Football Reference

Chuck Jacobs (born May 11, 1990) is an American former football wide receiver. He signed as an undrafted free agent with the San Francisco 49ers in 2013. He was also a member of the Baltimore Ravens and Toronto Argonauts. After attending Laney College he went on to play at Utah State.

== College career ==
=== Laney College ===
Jacobs began attending Laney College after graduating from high school in 2009. While playing for Laney he caught 27 passes for 238 yards and 2 touchdowns in 2010.

=== Utah State ===
In 2011, he began attending Utah State and playing for their football team as a wide receiver. As a junior in his first season with Utah State, he played in all 13 games, while starting in 5. He ended his junior season with 20 receptions, 218 receiving yards, and 2 touchdown receptions.

Jacobs returned as a senior to play in all 13 games with 6 starts. He had his best year at the collegiate level, ending the 2012 season with 41 receptions, 608 receiving yards, and also tied for a team-high 5 touchdown receptions.

He finished his collegiate career at Utah State with 61 receptions, 826 receiving yards, and 7 receiving touchdowns.

== Professional career ==
=== San Francisco 49ers ===
Jacobs went undrafted during the 2013 NFL draft and was signed as an undrafted free agent by the San Francisco 49ers.

On August 8, 2014, the 49ers waived/injured Jacobs due to tearing his ACL in the 49ers first 2014 pre-season game. He was placed on the team's injured reserve the following day.

Jacobs was waived on August 31, 2015 as part of mandatory roster cuts before the start of the season.

=== Baltimore Ravens ===
After a rash of injuries to Steve Smith Sr. and their receiving corps, Jacobs was signed to the Baltimore Ravens practice squad on November 4, 2015. On November 23, 2015, the Ravens released newly acquired veteran wide receiver Joe Morgan and promoted Jacobs to the active roster. He was waived by the Ravens on November 30. On December 2, 2015, he was re-signed to the practice squad. On May 6, 2016, the Ravens waived Jacobs. On August 29, 2016, Jacobs was waived by the Ravens.

=== Toronto Argonauts ===
Jacobs signed with the Toronto Argonauts of the Canadian Football League (CFL) on February 1, 2017. He was released on May 27, 2017.

== Personal life ==
Jacobs was born to JoAnn and Jesse Jacobs and has 7 sisters and 5 brothers. He graduated from Kennedy High School in Richmond, California and also lettered in track and field and basketball, leading his basketball team to a 27–6 record his senior year. He graduated in the fall of 2012 with an interdisciplinary studies degree with an emphasis on sociology and physical education from Utah State.
