= Charles James (American football) =

American football player (born 1990)

No. 31, 37, 38, 21
- Position: Cornerback

Personal information
- Born: May 14, 1990 (age 36); Jacksonville, Florida, U.S.
- Listed height: 5 ft 9 in (1.75 m)
- Listed weight: 179 lb (81 kg)

Career information
- High school: Mandarin (Jacksonville)
- College: Charleston Southern (2009–2012)
- NFL draft: 2013: undrafted

Career history
- New York Giants (2013); Houston Texans (2014–2015)*; Baltimore Ravens (2015); Houston Texans (2015–2016); Indianapolis Colts (2016); Buffalo Bills (2017)*; Jacksonville Jaguars (2017)*; Memphis Express (2019); St. Louis BattleHawks (2020)*; Houston Roughnecks (2020)
- * Offseason or practice squad member only

Career NFL statistics
- Total tackles: 43
- Pass deflections: 2
- Stats at Pro Football Reference

Charles James II (born May 14, 1990) is an American former professional football player who was a cornerback in the National Football League (NFL). He played college football for the Charleston Southern Buccaneers, and signed with the New York Giants as an undrafted free agent in 2013. James was also a member of the Houston Texans, Baltimore Ravens, Indianapolis Colts, Buffalo Bills, Jacksonville Jaguars, Memphis Express, St. Louis BattleHawks, and Houston Roughnecks.

== Professional career ==
=== New York Giants ===
James joined the New York Giants on May 10, 2013, as an undrafted free agent. He was released on August 31, 2013, and was signed to the practice squad the next day. He was promoted to the active roster on October 5, 2013, where he played in 12 regular season games mostly on special teams. James was released by the Giants on August 26, 2014.

=== First stint with Texans ===
James was signed to the Houston Texans' practice squad on October 1, 2014, and was promoted to the active roster on December 29, 2014. He was released by the Texans on September 5, 2015.

It was during this time that James became a fan favorite on the Texans' edition of Hard Knocks. He was used at running back in Week 3 of the preseason, scoring a 73-yard touchdown run that was taken away by a penalty.

=== Baltimore Ravens ===
James was signed to the Baltimore Ravens' practice squad on September 8, 2015. On October 13, 2015, he was signed to the active roster. On October 17, 2015, James was waived by the Ravens.

=== Second stint with Texans ===
James was claimed off waivers by the Texans on October 19, 2015. He was placed on injured reserve on December 28, 2015, with a foot injury. He was re-signed by the Texans on March 7, 2016.

On December 5, 2016, James was waived by the Texans.

=== Indianapolis Colts ===
James signed with the Indianapolis Colts on December 12, 2016. He was released on May 1, 2017.

=== Buffalo Bills ===
On May 2, 2017, James was claimed off waivers by the Buffalo Bills. He was waived on August 12, 2017.

=== Jacksonville Jaguars ===
James was claimed off waivers by the Jacksonville Jaguars on August 14, 2017. He was released on September 1, 2017.

=== Memphis Express ===
In 2019, James signed with the Memphis Express of the Alliance of American Football. The league ceased operations in April 2019.

=== St. Louis BattleHawks ===
On October 16, 2019, James was drafted by the XFL to play for the St. Louis BattleHawks.

=== Houston Roughnecks ===
James was traded to the Houston Roughnecks on January 21, 2020. He had his contract terminated when the league suspended operations on April 10, 2020.
