= Terrell Bonds =

American football player (born 1996)

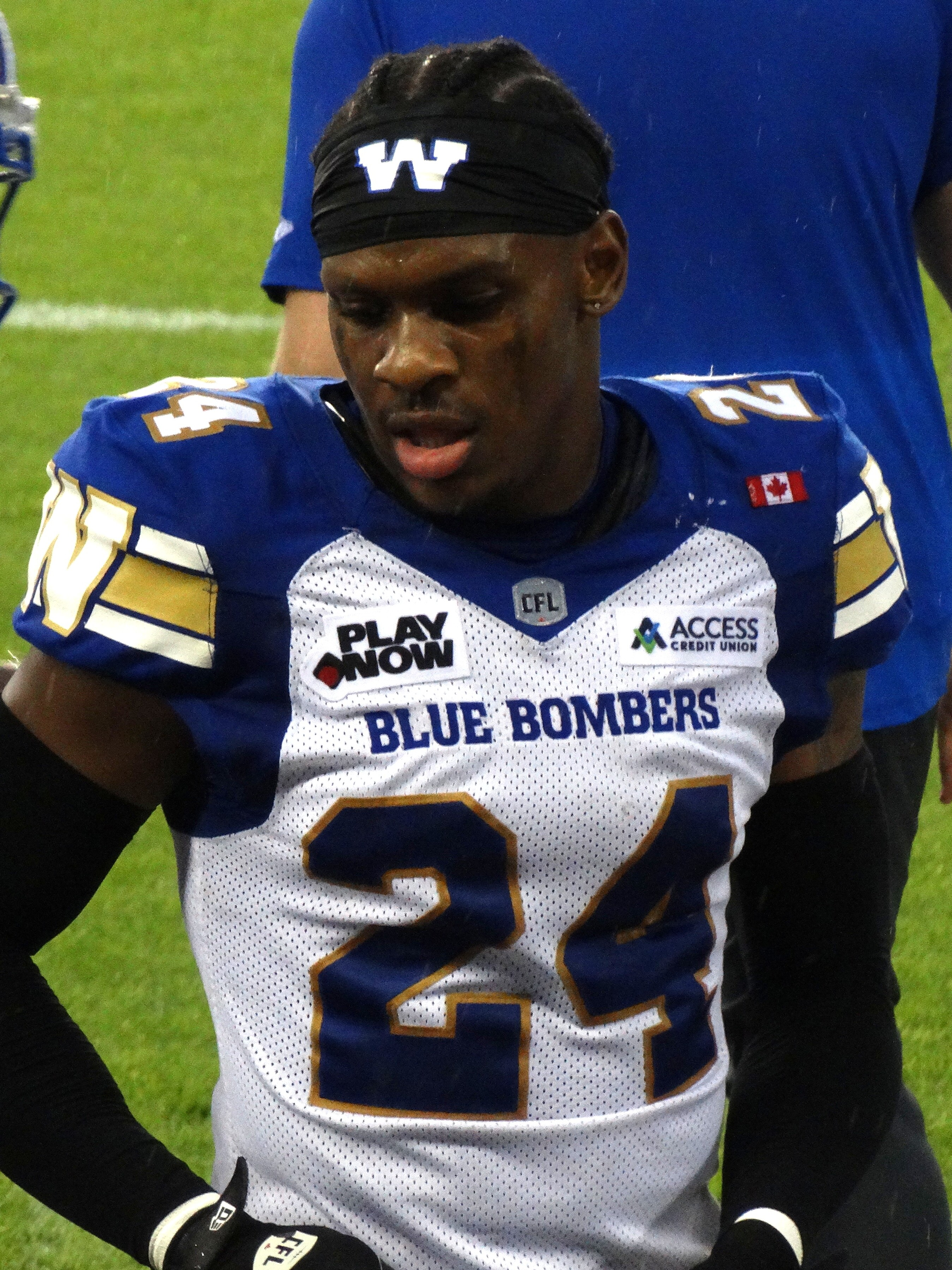
- Bonds with the Winnipeg Blue Bombers in 2025

Profile
- Position: Cornerback

Personal information
- Born: July 22, 1996 (age 30); Miami, Florida, U.S.
- Listed height: 5 ft 8 in (1.73 m)
- Listed weight: 182 lb (83 kg)

Career information
- High school: Miami Central High School
- College: Tennessee State (2014–2017)
- NFL draft: 2018: undrafted

Career history
- Memphis Express (2019); Baltimore Ravens (2019–2020); Miami Dolphins (2021)*; Pittsburgh Maulers (2022); Tennessee Titans (2022)*; San Antonio Brahmas (2023); Birmingham Stallions (2024)*; Winnipeg Blue Bombers (2024–2025)
- * Offseason or practice squad member only

Career NFL statistics
- Total tackles: 6
- Stats at Pro Football Reference
- Stats at CFL.ca

Terrell Bonds (born July 22, 1996) is an American professional football cornerback. He most recently played for the Winnipeg Blue Bombers of the Canadian Football League (CFL). He played college football at Tennessee State.

== College career ==
Bonds played college football for the Tennessee State Tigers.

== Professional career ==
Pre-draft measurables
Height	Weight	Arm length	Hand span	40-yard dash	10-yard split	20-yard split	20-yard shuttle	Three-cone drill	Vertical jump	Broad jump	Bench press
5 ft 8 1/2 in (1.74 m)	182 lb (83 kg)	31 in (0.79 m)	9 3/8 in (0.24 m)	4.50 s	1.63 s	2.63 s	4.34 s	7.12 s	34.5 in (0.88 m)	10 ft 1 in (3.07 m)	14 reps
All values from Pro Day

=== Memphis Express ===
Bonds played for the Memphis Express of the AAF for all 8 weeks until the league folded. He had a total of 14 tackles and a blocked punt for a touchdown

=== Baltimore Ravens ===
After the AAF ceased operations in April 2019, Bonds signed with the Baltimore Ravens of the National Football League on May 6, 2019. Bonds was released on August 31, 2019, as part of their final roster cuts, but later re-signed to the practice squad. He signed a reserve/future contract with the Ravens on January 13, 2020.

Bonds was waived on September 5, 2020, and re-signed to the practice squad the next day. He was elevated to the active roster on September 28 and October 31 for the team's weeks 3 and 8 games against the Kansas City Chiefs and Pittsburgh Steelers, and reverted to the practice squad after each game. He was placed on the practice squad/COVID-19 list by the team on November 3, 2020, and activated back to the practice squad four days later. He was promoted to the active roster on November 7. He was placed on injured reserve on November 17, 2020, after suffering a knee injury in Week 10. He was placed back on the COVID-19 list on November 30, 2020, and moved back to injured reserve on December 15. He was activated on December 31, 2020, but waived a day later and re-signed to the practice squad on January 4, 2021. His practice squad contract with the team expired after the season on January 25, 2021.

=== Miami Dolphins ===
The Miami Dolphins signed Bonds to a reserve/future contract on January 26, 2021. He was waived on August 21, 2021.

=== Pittsburgh Maulers ===
Bonds was selected in the 9th round of the 2022 USFL draft by the Pittsburgh Maulers.

=== Tennessee Titans ===
On August 3, 2022, Bonds signed with the Tennessee Titans. He was waived ten days later.

=== San Antonio Brahmas ===
On November 17, 2022, Bonds was drafted by the San Antonio Brahmas of the XFL.

=== Birmingham Stallions ===
On January 15, 2024, Bonds was selected by the Birmingham Stallions in the fourth round of the Super Draft portion of the 2024 UFL dispersal draft. He signed with the team on January 22. He was released on March 10, 2024.

=== Winnipeg Blue Bombers ===
On March 22, 2024, Bonds signed with the Winnipeg Blue Bombers of the Canadian Football League (CFL). Bonds became a free agent when his contract expired on February 10, 2026.
