= 2020 Tampa Bay Vipers season =

American professional football season

- Owner: Alpha Entertainment, LLC
- General manager: Marc Trestman
- Head coach: Marc Trestman
- Home stadium: Raymond James Stadium

Results
- Record: 1–4
- League place: 4th XFL East

The 2020 Tampa Bay Vipers season was the only season for the Tampa Bay Vipers as a professional American football franchise. They played as charter members of the XFL, one of eight teams to compete in the league for the 2020 season. The Vipers played their home games at Raymond James Stadium and were led by head coach Marc Trestman.

Their inaugural season was cut short due to the COVID-19 pandemic and the XFL officially suspended operations for the remainder of the season on March 20, 2020.

== Standings ==
2020 XFL standings
East Division
Team	W	L	PCT	TD+/-	TD+	TD-	DIV	PF	PA	DIFF	STK
DC Defenders	3	2	.600	-3	9	12	2–1	82	89	-7	W1
St. Louis BattleHawks	3	2	.600	3	11	8	1–1	97	77	20	L1
New York Guardians	3	2	.600	-1	8	9	1–2	79	85	-6	W2
Tampa Bay Vipers	1	4	.200	-4	11	15	1–1	98	115	-17	L1
West Division
Team	W	L	PCT	TD+/-	TD+	TD-	DIV	PF	PA	DIFF	STK
Houston Roughnecks	5	0	1.000	7	21	14	3–0	158	111	47	W5
Dallas Renegades	2	3	.400	-3	9	12	2–1	90	102	-12	L2
Los Angeles Wildcats	2	3	.400	4	18	14	0–2	129	122	7	W1
Seattle Dragons	1	4	.200	-3	12	15	0–2	87	119	-32	L3
(x)–clinched playoff berth; (y)–clinched conference; (e)–eliminated from playoff contention

== Schedule ==
All times Eastern

Week	Day	Date	Kickoff	TV	Opponent	Results		Location
Week	Day	Date	Kickoff	TV	Opponent	Score	Record	Location
1	Sunday	February 9	2:00 p.m.	Fox	at New York Guardians	L 3–23	0–1	MetLife Stadium
2	Saturday	February 15	5:00 p.m.	Fox	at Seattle Dragons	L 9–17	0–2	CenturyLink Field
3	Saturday	February 22	2:00 p.m.	ABC	Houston Roughnecks	L 27–34	0–3	Raymond James Stadium
4	Sunday	March 1	7:00 p.m.	ESPN2	DC Defenders	W 25–0	1–3	Raymond James Stadium
5	Sunday	March 8	9:00 p.m.	ESPN	at Los Angeles Wildcats	L 34–41	1–4	Dignity Health Sports Park
6	Saturday	March 14	5:00 p.m.	FS2	St. Louis BattleHawks	Not played		Raymond James Stadium
7	Saturday	March 21	2:00 p.m.	ABC	Dallas Renegades	Not played		Raymond James Stadium
8	Saturday	March 28	2:00 p.m.	ABC	at DC Defenders	Not played		Audi Field
9	Sunday	April 5	Noon	ESPN	at St. Louis BattleHawks	Not played		The Dome at America's Center
10	Sunday	April 12	TBA		New York Guardians	Not played		Raymond James Stadium

== Final roster ==
2020 Tampa Bay Vipers final roster
Quarterbacks: 4 Taylor Cornelius; 9 Quinton Flowers; 11 Aaron Murray; Running backs: 36 Tarean Folston; 29 Jacques Patrick; 24 De'Veon Smith; 34 Brandon Wilds; Wide receivers: 12 Ryan Davis; 1 S. J. Green; 18 Reece Horn; 15 Seantavius Jones; 16 Jake Lampman; 19 Tanner McEvoy; 17 Jalen Tolliver; 81 Dan Williams; Tight ends: 80 DeAndre Goolsby; 89 Pharoah McKever; 86 Colin Thompson; 85 Nick Truesdell	Offensive linemen: 76 Daronte Bouldin G; 67 Jerald Foster G; 73 Martez Ivey T; 78 Marquis Lucas T/G; 63 Jordan McCray C; 69 Na'Ty Rodgers T; 75 Andrew Tiller G; 71 Isaiah Williams T; 50 John Yarbrough C/G; Defensive linemen: 92 Josh Banks DT; 94 Shane Bowman DT; 58 Obum Gwacham DE; 53 Deiontrez Mount DE; 96 Jason Neill DE; 91 Bobby Richardson DE; 93 Kellen Soulek DT; 97 Ricky Walker DT; 49 Nikita Whitlock DT	Linebackers: 57 Thurston Armbrister OLB; 43 Emmanuel Beal MLB; 52 Reggie Northrup OLB; 41 Terrance Plummer OLB; 45 Lucas Wacha MLB; Defensive backs: 35 Marcelis Branch FS; 31 Trey Caldwell CB; 28 Bryce Canady FS; 27 Micah Hannemann CB; 30 Demontre Hurst SS; 23 Anthoula Kelly CB; 20 Tarvarus McFadden CB; 21 Robert Priester SS; 37 Robenson Therezie SS; 26 Herb Waters CB; Special teams: 3 Andrew Franks K; 42 Nick Moore LS; 10 Jake Schum P	Reserve lists: 5 Antonio Callaway WR (IR); 22 Rannell Hall CB (IR); 33 Shelton Lewis CB (IR); -- Christian Morris T (IR); 55 active, 4 inactive

== Staff ==
2020 Tampa Bay Vipers staff
Front office: President – Josh Bullock; Director of player personnel – Josh Hinch; Director of Football Operations – Josh Moore; Manager of Football Operations/Scout – Ron Selesky; Head coaches: Head coach/general manager – Marc Trestman; Offensive coaches: Offensive coordinator/Receivers – Jaime Elizondo; Quarterbacks – Josh Neiswander; Running backs – Justin Poindexter; Tight ends – Pete Mangurian; Offensive Line – Jonathan Himebauch	Defensive coaches: Defensive coordinator – Jerry Glanville; Defensive line – Bert Hill; Linebackers – Mike Archer; Secondary – William Fields

== Season summary ==
In the first week of the season, the Vipers took a loss to the New York Guardians, only scoring a field goal in the 3rd quarter. They then lost to the Seattle Dragons in the second week of the season, losing 17–9 in Seattle. Even after the two losses, they put up a fight against the then 2-0 Houston Roughnecks, only losing by a mere 7 points at home. They got their first win of the XFL season against the DC Defenders, shutting them out 25–0 to advance to 1–3. In week 5, they blew an 18-point lead and lost to the Los Angeles Wildcats on the road 41–34.

== Game summaries ==
=== Week 1: at New York Guardians ===
Week 1 — Tampa Bay at New York

Quarter	1	2	3	4	Total
Vipers	0	0	3	0	3
Guardians	7	10	0	6	23

at MetLife Stadium, East Rutherford, New Jersey

- Date: Sunday, February 9
- Game time: 2:00 p.m. EST
- Game weather: Cloudy • Temperature: 42 °F (6 °C) • Wind: E 6 mph
- Game attendance: 17,634
- Referee: Jeff Heaser
- TV announcers (Fox): Kevin Burkhardt (play-by-play), Greg Olsen (analyst), Jenny Taft (sideline)

Game information

First quarter

- NY – Matt McGloin 1-yard rush (1-pt. good), 9:55. Guardians 7–0. Drive: 8 plays, 48 yards, 5:08.

Second quarter

- NY – Colby Pearson 12-yard pass from Matt McGloin (1-pt good), 13:38. Guardians 14–0. Drive: 3 plays, 57 yards, 1:21.
- NY – Matt McCrane 49-yard field goal, 0:05. Guardians 17–0. Drive: 3 plays, 37 yards, 0:31.

Third quarter

- TB – Andrew Franks 23-yard field goal, 1:05. Guardians 17–3. Drive: 16 plays, 77 yards, 7:42.

Fourth quarter

- NY – Jamar Summers 27-yard fumble return (1-pt. failed), 12:09. Guardians 23–3.

Top passers

- TB – Aaron Murray – 16/34, 231 yards, TD, 2 INT
- NY – Matt McGloin – 15/29, 182 yards, TD

Top rushers

- TB – De'Veon Smith – 16 carries, 79 yards
- NY – Darius Victor – 9 carries, 32 yards

Top receivers

- TB – Daniel Williams – 6 receptions, 123 yards
- NY – Mekale McKay – 3 receptions, 58 yards

Tampa Bay entered the game as a 3½ point favorite, but went on to suffer a 20-point blowout loss on the road. The Vipers suffered 4 turnovers and gave up 3 touchdowns while only getting 1 field goal, despite getting inside the 5-yard line multiple times.

=== Week 2: at Seattle Dragons ===
Week 2 — Tampa Bay at Seattle

Quarter	1	2	3	4	Total
Vipers	0	3	6	0	9
Dragons	0	0	14	3	17

at CenturyLink Field, Seattle, Washington

- Date: Saturday, February 15
- Game time: 5:00 p.m. EST
- Game weather: Rain • Temperature: 46 °F (8 °C) • Wind: S 12 mph
- Game attendance: 29,172
- Referee: Tra Blake
- TV announcers (Fox): Curt Menefee (play-by-play), Joel Klatt (analyst)

Game information

First quarter
No scoring
Second quarter

- TB – Andrew Franks 36-yard field goal, 2:36. Vipers 3–0. Drive: 9 plays, 44 yards, 4:58.

Third quarter

- TB – Tarvarus McFadden 78-yard interception return (1-pt failed), 12:18. Vipers 9–0.
- SEA – Keenan Reynolds 68-yard pass from Brandon Silvers (2-pt failed), 11:26. Vipers 9–6. Drive: 2 plays, 69 yards, 0:33.
- SEA – Marcell Frazier 1-yard interception return (2-pt good), 5:31. Dragons 14–9.

Fourth quarter

- SEA – Ernesto Lacayo 27-yard field goal, 1:07. Dragons 17–9. Drive: 7 plays, 35 yards, 1:38.

Top passers

- TB – Taylor Cornelius – 16/27, 154 yards, 0 TD, 2 INT
- SEA – Brandon Silvers – 7/18, 91 yards, 1 TD, 1 INT

Top rushers

- TB – Jacques Patrick – 14 carries, 73 yards
- SEA – Trey Williams – 11 carries, 45 yards

Top receivers

- TB – Reece Horn – 5 receptions, 51 yards
- SEA – Keenan Reynolds – 3 receptions, 87 yards, 1 TD

=== Week 3: Houston Roughnecks ===
Week 3 — Houston at Tampa Bay

Quarter	1	2	3	4	Total
Roughnecks	9	9	8	8	34
Vipers	3	15	6	3	27

at Raymond James Stadium, Tampa, Florida

- Date: Saturday, February 22
- Game time: 2:00 p.m. EST
- Game weather: Cloudy • Temperature: 69 °F (21 °C) • Wind: ENE 13 mph
- Game attendance: 18,117
- Referee: James Carter
- TV announcers (ABC): Steve Levy (play-by-play), Greg McElroy (analyst), Tom Luginbill and Dianna Russini (sideline)

Game information

First quarter

- TB – Andrew Franks 48-yard field goal, 12:34. Vipers 3–0. Drive: 7 plays, 29 yards, 2:26.
- HOU – Cam Phillips 84-yard pass from Phillip Walker (3-pt. good), 3:49. Roughnecks 9–3. Drive: 1 play, 84 yards, 0:13.

Second quarter

- TB – Quinton Flowers 7-yard rush (1-pt. good), 9:17. Vipers 10–9. Drive: 7 plays, 58 yards, 2:51.
- HOU – Phillip Walker 8-yard rush (3-pt. failed), 5:06. Roughnecks 15–10. Drive: 8 plays, 76 yards, 4:12.
- HOU – Sergio Castillo 28-yard field goal, 1:00. Roughnecks 18–10. Drive: 7 plays, 49 yards, 2:17.
- TB – Taylor Cornelius 1-yard rush (2-pt. good), 0:03. Tied 18–18. Drive: 6 plays, 59 yards, 0:56.

Third quarter

- HOU – Cam Phillips 24-yard pass from Phillip Walker (2-pt. good), 12:13. Roughnecks 26–18. Drive: 5 plays, 80 yards, 2:27.
- TB – Daniel Williams 20-yard pass from Taylor Cornelius (2-pt. failed), 2:13. Roughnecks 26–24. Drive: 8 plays, 61 yards, 3:45.

Fourth quarter

- TB – Andrew Franks 43-yard field goal, 12:51. Vipers 27–26. Drive: 6 plays, 23 yards, 2:06.
- HOU – Cam Phillips 17 yard pass from Phillip Walker (2-pt. good), 10:31. Roughnecks 34–27. Drive: 5 plays, 63 yards, 2:24.

Top passers

- HOU – Phillip Walker – 24/36, 306 yards, 3 TD
- TB – Taylor Cornelius – 16/31, 193 yards, TD, INT

Top rushers

- HOU – James Butler – 7 carries, 72 yards
- TB – De'Veon Smith – 15 carries, 49 yards

Top receivers

- HOU – Cam Phillips – 8 receptions, 194 yards, 3 TD
- TB – Jalen Tolliver – 8 receptions, 104 yards

=== Week 4: DC Defenders ===
Week 4 — DC at Tampa Bay

Quarter	1	2	3	4	Total
Defenders	0	0	0	0	0
Vipers	7	9	6	3	25

at Raymond James Stadium, Tampa, Florida

- Date: Sunday, March 1
- Game time: 7:00 p.m. EST
- Game weather: Mostly cloudy • Temperature: 60 °F (16 °C) • Wind: NNE 3 mph
- Referee: Jeff Heaser
- TV announcers (ESPN2): Tom Hart (play-by-play), Joey Galloway (analyst), Pat McAfee (sideline)

Game information

First quarter

- TB – Jacques Patrick 8-yard rush (1-pt. good), 8:43. Vipers 7–0. Drive: 11 plays, 75 yards, 4:29.

Second quarter

- TB – DeAndre Goolsby 13-yard pass from Taylor Cornelius (1-pt. failed), 13:41. Vipers 13–0. Drive: 15 plays, 75 yards, 6:48.
- TB – Andrew Franks 40–yard field goal, 3:45. Vipers 16–0. Drive: 9 plays, 47 yards, 4:46.

Third quarter

- TB – Taylor Cornelius 17-yard rush (2-pt. failed), 4:36. Vipers 22–0. Drive: 3 plays, 23 yards, 1:05.

Fourth quarter

- TB – Andrew Franks 26-yard field goal, 10:17. Vipers 25–0. Drive: 17 plays, 71 yards, 7:22.

Top passers

- DC – Cardale Jones – 9/22, 72 yards, INT
- TB – Taylor Cornelius – 24/31, 211 yards, TD, INT

Top rushers

- DC – Donnel Pumphrey – 7 carries, 34 yards
- TB – De'Veon Smith – 24 carries, 122 yards

Top receivers

- DC – Donnel Pumphrey – 3 receptions, 32 yards
- TB – Daniel Williams – 7 receptions, 72 yards

=== Week 5: at Los Angeles Wildcats ===
Week 5 — Tampa Bay at Los Angeles

Quarter	1	2	3	4	Total
Vipers	10	14	0	10	34
Wildcats	0	20	7	14	41

at Dignity Health Sports Park, Los Angeles, California

- Date: Sunday, March 8
- Game time: 9:00 p.m. EST / 6:00 p.m. PST
- Referee: Reggie Smith
- TV announcers (ESPN): Tom Hart (play-by-play), Joey Galloway (analyst), Pat McAfee (sideline)

Game information

First quarter

Second quarter

Third quarter

Fourth quarter

Top passers

- TB –
- LA –

Top rushers

- TB –
- LA –

Top receivers

- TB –
- LA –
