= 2014 Senior Bowl =

2014 Reese's Senior Bowl
- 65th Senior Bowl
North Team	South Team
10	20
Head coach: Mike Smith (Atlanta Falcons)	Head coach: Gus Bradley (Jacksonville Jaguars)
	1	2	3	4	Total
North	0	3	0	7	10
South	10	10	0	0	20
- Date: January 25, 2014
- Season: 2013
- Stadium: Ladd–Peebles Stadium
- Location: Mobile, Alabama
- MVP: Dee Ford
- Referee: Scott Novak
- Attendance: 37,914

United States TV coverage
- Network: NFL Network

The 2014 Senior Bowl was an all-star college football exhibition game featured players from the 2013 college football season, and prospects for the 2014 draft of the professional National Football League (NFL). The game concluded the post-season that began on December 21, 2013. It was sponsored by Reese's Peanut Butter Cups and is officially known as the Reese's Senior Bowl.

The game was played on January 25, 2014, at 3:00 p.m. CST, at Ladd–Peebles Stadium in Mobile, Alabama, between "North" and "South" teams, with the South team winning the game 20–10. Mike Smith of the Atlanta Falcons and Gus Bradley of the Jacksonville Jaguars served as the North and South head coaches, respectively.

Coverage of the event was provided on the NFL Network.

== Rosters ==
=== North Team ===
No.	Name	Position	HT/WT	School
1	Josh Huff	WR	5'11"/220	Oregon
2	Nevin Lawson	CB	5'10"/186	Utah State
3	Logan Thomas	QB	6'6"/254	Virginia Tech
4	Marqueston Huff	CB	6'0"/195	Wyoming
5	Isaiah Lewis	S	5'10"/210	Michigan State
6	Ahmad Dixon	S	6'0"/205	Baylor
9	Chris Boswell	K	6'2"/200	Rice
10	Tajh Boyd	QB	6'1"/225	Clemson
13	Kirby Van Der Kamp	P	6'4"/211	Iowa State
14	Dezmen Southward	S	6'2"/210	Wisconsin
15	Jimmie Ward	CB	5'11"/192	Northern Illinois
16	Michael Campanaro	WR	5'11"/190	Wake Forest
16	Stanley Jean-Baptiste	CB	6'3"/220	Nebraska
17	Stephen Morris	QB	6'2"/218	Miami (FL)
20	Deone Bucannon	S	6'1"/198	Washington State
20	James White	RB	5'10"/195	Wisconsin
22	Kain Colter	WR	6'0"/190	Northwestern
23	Dontae Johnson	CB	6'2"/195	North Carolina State
25	Gator Hoskins	TE	6'2"/244	Marshall
30	Pierre Desir	CB	6'2"/206	Lindenwood
33	Charles Sims	RB	6'0"/213	West Virginia
34	David Fluellen	RB	6'0"/215	Toledo
44	Chris Borland	ILB	5'11"/246	Wisconsin
45	Christian Kirksey	OLB	6'2"/235	Iowa
46	Jonathan Brown	OLB	6'1"/235	Illinois
55	Michael Sam	OLB	6'2"/255	Missouri
56	Jordan Zumwalt	ILB	6'4"/235	UCLA

No.	Name	Position	HT/WT	School
58	Tyler Larsen	C	6'4"/312	Utah State
59	Shamar Stephen	DT	6'5"/315	UConn
63	Tyler Ott	LS	6'3"/245	Harvard
65	Brandon Linder	OG	6'6"/319	Miami (FL)
68	Cyril Richardson	OG	6'5"/335	Baylor
70	Weston Richburg	C	6'4"/300	Colorado State
72	Zach Martin	OT	6'4"/308	Notre Dame
74	Jack Mewhort	OT	6'7"/308	Ohio State
75	Brandon Thomas	OT	6'3"/305	Clemson
76	Seantrel Henderson	OT	6'8"/345	Miami (FL)
78	Michael Schofield	OG	6'7"/304	Michigan
79	Kadeem Edwards	OG	6'3"/315	Tennessee State
80	Shaquelle Evans	WR	6'1"/204	UCLA
82	Jeff Janis	WR	6'3"/205	Saginaw Valley State
84	Jared Abbrederis	WR	6'2"/190	Wisconsin
85	Ryan Hewitt	FB	6'4"/245	Stanford
86	Jacob Pedersen	TE	6'5"/240	Wisconsin
87	C. J. Fiedorowicz	TE	6'7"/265	Iowa
88	Robert Herron	WR	5'10"/187	Wyoming
90	Marcus Smith	OLB	6'3"/252	Louisville
91	DaQuan Jones	DT	6'3"/318	Penn State
93	Trent Murphy	DE	6'6"/261	Stanford
94	Will Clarke	DT	6'7"/273	West Virginia
95	Kareem Martin	DE	6'6"/265	North Carolina
97	Aaron Donald	DT	6'0"/285	Pittsburgh
98	James Gayle	DE	6'4"/255	Virginia Tech
99	Ra'Shede Hageman	DT	6'6"/311	Minnesota

=== South Team ===
No.	Name	Position	HT/WT	School
1	Mike Davis	WR	6'2"/195	Texas
1	Keith McGill	CB	6'3"/205	Utah
2	Cody Hoffman	WR	6'4"/215	BYU
3	Kyle Van Noy	OLB	6'3"/245	BYU
3	Ryan Grant	WR	6'1"/191	Tulane
4	Derek Carr	QB	6'3"/218	Fresno State
5	Antonio Andrews	RB	6'0"/211	Western Kentucky
6	Craig Loston	S	6'2"/209	LSU
7	Christian Jones	ILB	6'4"/235	Florida State
8	Jalen Saunders	WR	5'9"/157	Oklahoma
10	Jimmy Garoppolo	QB	6'2"/222	Eastern Illinois
11	Chris Davis	CB	5'11"/200	Auburn
12	David Fales	QB	6'2"/220	San Jose State
13	Jemea Thomas	S	5'10"/195	Georgia Tech
14	Aaron Colvin	CB	5'11"/182	Oklahoma
18	Lavelle Westbrooks	CB	6'0"/192	Georgia Southern
20	Walt Aikens	CB	6'1"/200	Liberty
21	Lorenzo Taliaferro	RB	6'2"/230	Coastal Carolina
22	Telvin Smith	OLB	6'3"/218	Florida State
23	Jaylen Watkins	CB	6'0"/181	Florida
24	Jerick McKinnon	RB	5'9"/215	Georgia Southern
26	Kenny Ladler	S	6'1"/205	Vanderbilt
29	Cody Mandell	P	6'4"/213	Alabama
30	Dee Ford	DE	6'2"/240	Auburn
31	Terrence Brooks	S	5'11"/200	Florida State
35	Jay Prosch	FB	6'1"/250	Auburn
36	Cody Parkey	K	6'0"/190	Auburn

No.	Name	Position	HT/WT	School
37	Jordan Tripp	OLB	6'3"/237	Montana
42	Chris Smith	DE	6'3"/268	Arkansas
45	Jeremiah Attaochu	OLB	6'3"/242	Georgia Tech
49	Ed Stinson	DE	6'4"/292	Alabama
50	Lamin Barrow	ILB	6'2"/232	LSU
52	Bryan Stork	C	6'4"/305	Florida State
52	Adrian Hubbard	OLB	6'6"/252	Alabama
60	Gabe Jackson	OG	6'4"/335	Mississippi State
62	Marcus Heit	LS	6'3"/244	Kansas State
64	Travis Swanson	C	6'5"/318	Arkansas
65	Gabe Ikard	C	6'3"/298	Oklahoma
66	Wesley Johnson	OG	6'5"/295	Vanderbilt
67	Jon Halapio	OG	6'3"/315	Florida
70	Ja'Wuan James	OT	6'6"/318	Tennessee
71	Joel Bitonio	OG	6'4"/315	Nevada
72	Billy Turner	OT	6'6"/314	North Dakota State
78	Morgan Moses	OT	6'6"/335	Virginia
80	Solomon Patton	WR	5'9"/171	Florida
83	Kevin Norwood	WR	6'2"/195	Alabama
85	Marcel Jensen	TE	6'6"/260	Fresno State
87	Jordan Matthews	WR	6'5"/272	Vanderbilt
88	Arthur Lynch	TE	6'5"/254	Georgia
90	Will Sutton	DT	6'1"/305	Arizona State
91	Caraun Reid	DT	6'1"/305	Princeton
92	Deandre Coleman	DT	6'5"/315	California
95	Justin Ellis	DT	6'2"/357	Louisiana Tech
98	Daniel McCullers	DT	6'8"/351	Tennessee
99	Brent Urban	DE	6'7"/295	Virginia

== Game summary ==
=== Scoring summary ===
Scoring Play	Score
1st Quarter
SOUTH – Crockett Gillmore 17–yard pass from Derek Carr (Cody Parkey kick), 09:53	SOUTH 7 – 0
SOUTH – Cody Parkey 50–yard field goal, 01:35	SOUTH 10 – 0
2nd Quarter
SOUTH – Cody Parkey 39–yard field goal, 11:20	SOUTH 13 – 0
SOUTH – Kevin Norwood 24–yard pass from David Fales (Cody Parkey kick), 07:32	SOUTH 20 – 0
NORTH – Chris Boswell 38–yard field goal, 00:54	SOUTH 20 – 3
3rd Quarter
No Scoring	SOUTH 20 – 3
4th Quarter
NORTH – James White 1–yard run (Chris Boswell kick), 06:04	SOUTH 20 – 10

=== Statistics ===
Statistics	North	South
First downs	17	12
Total offense, plays - yards	70–231	54–231
Rushes-yards (net)	32–94	22–50
Passing yards (net)	137	181
Passes, Comp-Att-Int	21–39–3	19–31–2
Time of Possession	34:00	26:00
