= Taylor Cornelius =

American gridiron football player (born 1995)

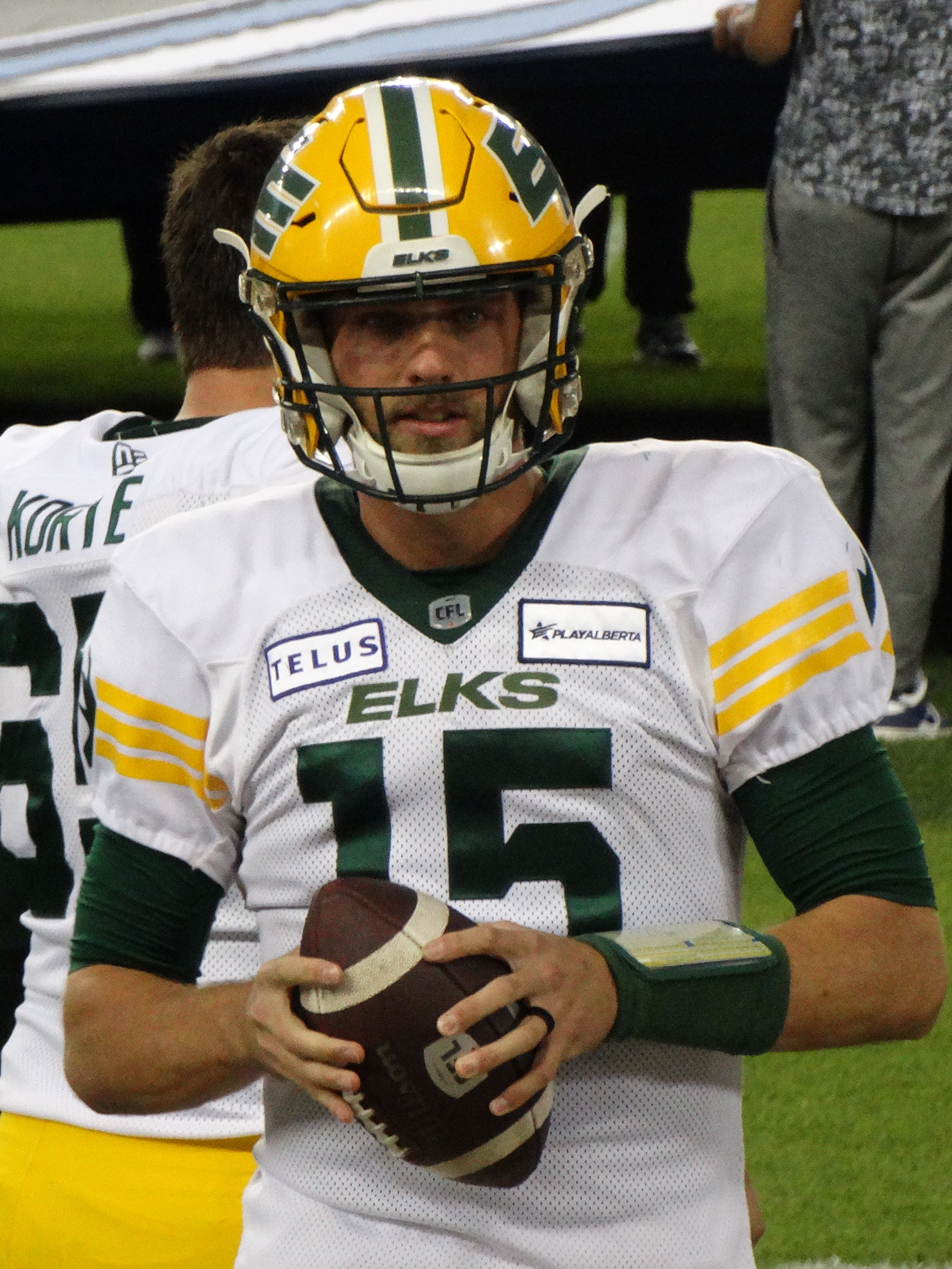
- Cornelius with the Edmonton Elks in 2023

No. 15
- Position: Quarterback

Personal information
- Born: September 16, 1995 (age 31); Amarillo, Texas, U.S.
- Listed height: 6 ft 5 in (1.96 m)
- Listed weight: 230 lb (104 kg)

Career information
- High school: Bushland (TX)
- College: Oklahoma State
- NFL draft: 2019: undrafted

Career history
- Green Bay Packers (2019)*; Tampa Bay Vipers (2020); Edmonton Elks (2021–2023)
- * Offseason or practice squad member only

Career CFL statistics
- Passing completions: 451
- Passing attempts: 779
- Completion percentage: 57.9
- TD–INT: 25–31
- Passing yards: 5,868
- Stats at CFL.ca

Taylor Cornelius (born September 16, 1995) is an American former professional football quarterback. He played college football at Oklahoma State.

Cornelius started as a 5th year senior for the Oklahoma State Cowboys football team in Stillwater, Oklahoma. His final home game in Boone Pickens Stadium was a dramatic come from behind victory over 9th ranked West Virginia on Senior Day.

== Early life ==
He was born in Amarillo, Texas and grew up in Bushland, Texas. He went to Bushland High School where he completed 283 of 437 passes for 3,815 yards and 46 touchdowns his senior year, 270 of 503 passes for 3,219 yards and 23 touchdowns his junior year, and 167 of 325 passes for 2,140 yards and 19 touchdowns as a sophomore. He also played basketball, baseball, and track in high school. The Amarillo Globe-News chose him as their Athlete of the Year his senior year in high school. He is revered in his hometown.

== College career ==
Cornelius was an unheralded recruit out of high school with one offer, from West Texas A&M. For most of his collegiate career, Cornelius was a backup, behind one of Oklahoma State's most decorated quarterbacks, Mason Rudolph.

In 2014, Cornelius enrolled at Oklahoma State University and walked on to the football team. In 2017, Cornelius was awarded a football scholarship by the Oklahoma State University coaching staff. He was seldom used until his fifth and final year of eligibility, where he led the Cowboys to a 7–6 season. His receivers included: Bilitnikoff Award finalist Tylan Wallace, and former 5-star recruit and LSU transfer Tyron Johnson; who helped the Cornelius to a top 10 national ranking in: passing touchdowns, passing yards, passing yards per game, points responsible for, points responsible for per game, and total offense.

At the beginning of the 2018 season, head coach Mike Gundy made it clear that Cornelius would be the starting quarterback over transfer Dru Brown and true freshman Spencer Sanders. In the first game of the season, Cornelius led the Cowboys to a 58–17 win over the Missouri State Bears, a game in which he threw for 300 yards and 5 touchdowns. His first real test came on September 15 in a game against the 17th ranked Boise State Broncos. Cornelius threw for 243 yards and 1 touchdown while adding the game-sealing touchdown on the ground. This win bumped the Cowboys up to number 15 in the Associated Press rankings. After losing 3 of the next 4 games, the Cowboys sat at 4-3 when the Texas Longhorns came to Stillwater. Cornelius shined on national TV, throwing for 321 yards and 3 touchdowns and adding 2 more rushing touchdowns en route to a 38–35 win. Two weeks later, the Cowboys went on the road to Norman, Oklahoma to take on the Oklahoma Sooners in the yearly Bedlam Series. Cornelius went toe-to-toe with future number 1 overall pick Kyler Murray. He threw for a Bedlam school record and third-most in Oklahoma State single game history; 501 yards and 3 touchdowns. On the last offensive play of the game, Cornelius under threw star wideout Tylan Wallace, ending any upset bid the Cowboys had going. The very next week on November 17, the 9th ranked West Virginia Mountaineers visited Stillwater for the final home game of the year. On Senior Day, Cornelius led Oklahoma State to a come from behind upset victory over the Mountaineers, out-dueling Will Grier. He threw for 338 yards and 5 touchdowns and had 106 yards rushing and 1 rushing touchdown. This is widely considered to be his greatest game as a Cowboy. After a season finale loss against TCU, Cornelius led the Cowboys to the Liberty Bowl against Drew Lock and the Missouri Tigers. The Cowboys would win this game to finish 7–6, with Cornelius throwing for 336 yards and 4 touchdowns.

He ended his 2018 redshirt senior season with 3,978 yards and 32 passing touchdowns, both ranked in the top 10 nationally. Cornelius is tied for second in single season touchdowns accounted for with 1988 Heisman Trophy winner Barry Sanders (42), both behind 2018's Johnny Unitas Golden Arm Award winner and current Pittsburgh Steeler quarterback, Mason Rudolph (47). Cornelius holds spots inside the top 10 of the Oklahoma State Football record books in the following: single game passing yards (501) and touchdowns (5), single season passing yards (3,978) and touchdowns (32), and career passing yards (4,198) and passing touchdowns (32).

== Professional career ==
=== Green Bay Packers ===
After going undrafted in the 2019 NFL draft, Cornelius participated in rookie camp with the Green Bay Packers and received a contract. He did not make the final roster.

=== Tampa Bay Vipers ===
In October 2019, he was selected by the Tampa Bay Vipers in the 2020 XFL draft. In his first career start during the second week, Cornelius passed for 154 yards with two interceptions, making 16 of his 27 pass attempts. Trailing by 8, Cornelius managed to get the Vipers to the Seattle 28-yard line, but threw an interception as time expired, securing a 17–9 victory for the Seattle Dragons. In his second start, against the unbeaten Houston Roughnecks, Cornelius was 16/31 throwing for 193 yards with one touchdown and one interception. He also ran for 33 yards and a score. In the end, Cornelius threw the game-sealing interception with about 1 minute left, leading to a 34–27 victory for Houston. In week 4 the winless Vipers took on the DC Defenders. Cornelius was 24/31 throwing for 211 yards with one touchdown and one interception. He also rushed for 36 yards and a score. Led by a strong running game and solid defense, the Viper shutout the Defenders 25-0 for their first victory. In Week 5 against the 1–3 Los Angeles Wildcats Cornelius was 22/34 throwing for 300 yards with two touchdowns and two interceptions. He also ran for another score. Although holding a 24–6 lead in the second quarter, the Vipers were outscored 35-10 the remainder of the game. Late in the game, Cornelius led the Vipers to LA 7-yard line but threw another game-sealing interception. LA hung on for a 41–34 victory. Due to the COVID-19 pandemic, the 2020 XFL season was cut short after 5 games. The Vipers finished with a 1–4 record, in last place in the east division. He had his contract terminated when the league suspended operations on April 10, 2020.

=== Edmonton Elks ===
Cornelius signed with the Edmonton Football Team of the CFL on February 9, 2021. In mid-September starting quarterback Trevor Harris was placed on the six-game injured reserve list with a neck injury, subsequently Cornelius was named the starting quarterback for the team's Week 7 match against the Winnipeg Blue Bombers. Cornelius started in the team's next two games as Harris recovered from injury. Harris returned from injury in Week 10, but was replaced by Cornelius in the fourth quarter as Harris proved to be ineffective. On October 12, 2021, Elks head coach Jamie Elizondo announced that Cornelius would once again get the Week 11 start ahead of a healthy Harris who wasn't performing to expectations. On October 17, 2021, Harris was traded to the Montreal Alouettes, which resulted in Cornelius becoming the starting quarterback for the remainder of the season. Cornelius played in 14 games for the Elks, completing 143 passes for 1,795 yards with nine touchdown passes and 13 interceptions. The Elks finished the season with only three wins, finishing last in the West division, missing the playoffs in the process.

Cornelius began the 2022 season as the Elks' third-string quarterback, however Nick Arbuckle proved to be ineffective (and was later traded) and rookie quarterback Tre Ford suffered a shoulder injury; as a result, Cornelius was named the starting quarterback for Week 6. Cornelius remained the starting quarterback through Week 14, at which time he signed a two-year contract extension to remain with the Elks. He received a $50,000 roster bonus on January 15, 2023, and his base salary for the 2023 season will be $165,000, with another $23,500 in allowances. The base salary increases to $200,000 for the 2024 season. On October 17, 2022, the Elks announced that Cornelius would miss the final game of the season with a spleen injury. Edmonton finished last place in the West division for the second consecutive season and missed the playoffs.

Entering the 2023 season, there was growing optimism that Cornelius could make the leap in this third year in the league. He started the first three games of the 2023 season for the Elks, but the offense struggled and he was benched in Week 3 in favour of Kai Locksley and then later Jarret Doege. After the team fell to 0-4 to start the season, head coach Chris Jones turned to Cornelius to take the helm in Week 5. In Week 6, he was once again benched after turning the ball over twice in the second half which resulted in the Elks falling to 0-6 on the season. Following another loss resulting in eight straight defeats to start the season, offensive coordinator Stephen McAdoo was demoted and Cornelius was relegated to short yardage duties as Ford took over as starting quarterback, which he held for the remainder of the season. On January 9, 2024, Cornelius was released by the Elks.

=== Professional statistics ===
Season	League	Team	Games			Passing								Rushing			
Season	League	Team	GP	GS	Record	Cmp	Att	Pct	Yds	Y/A	TD	Int	Rtg	Att	Yds	Y/A	TD
2020	XFL	TB	5	4	1–3	78	123	63.0	858	7.0	4	6	74.5	17	114	6.7	3
2021	CFL	EDM	14	8	1–7	143	247	57.9	1,795	7.3	9	13	70.8	21	149	7.1	1
2022	CFL	EDM	12	12	3–9	205	357	57.4	2,768	7.8	11	9	82.0	71	502	7.1	7
2023	CFL	EDM	18	7	0–7	103	175	58.9	1,305	7.5	5	9	70.3	61	256	4.2	8
CFL Totals			44	27	4–23	451	779	57.9	5,868	7.5	25	31	75.8	153	907	5.9	16

== Personal life ==
His parents are Phyllis and Warren Cornelius. Olympic swimmer Josh Davis is his cousin, as are football player Brandon Green and former University of Oklahoma baseball player Casey Bookout. His brother, Chance, also serves in the United States Navy.
