= Nick Boyle =

American football player (born 1993)

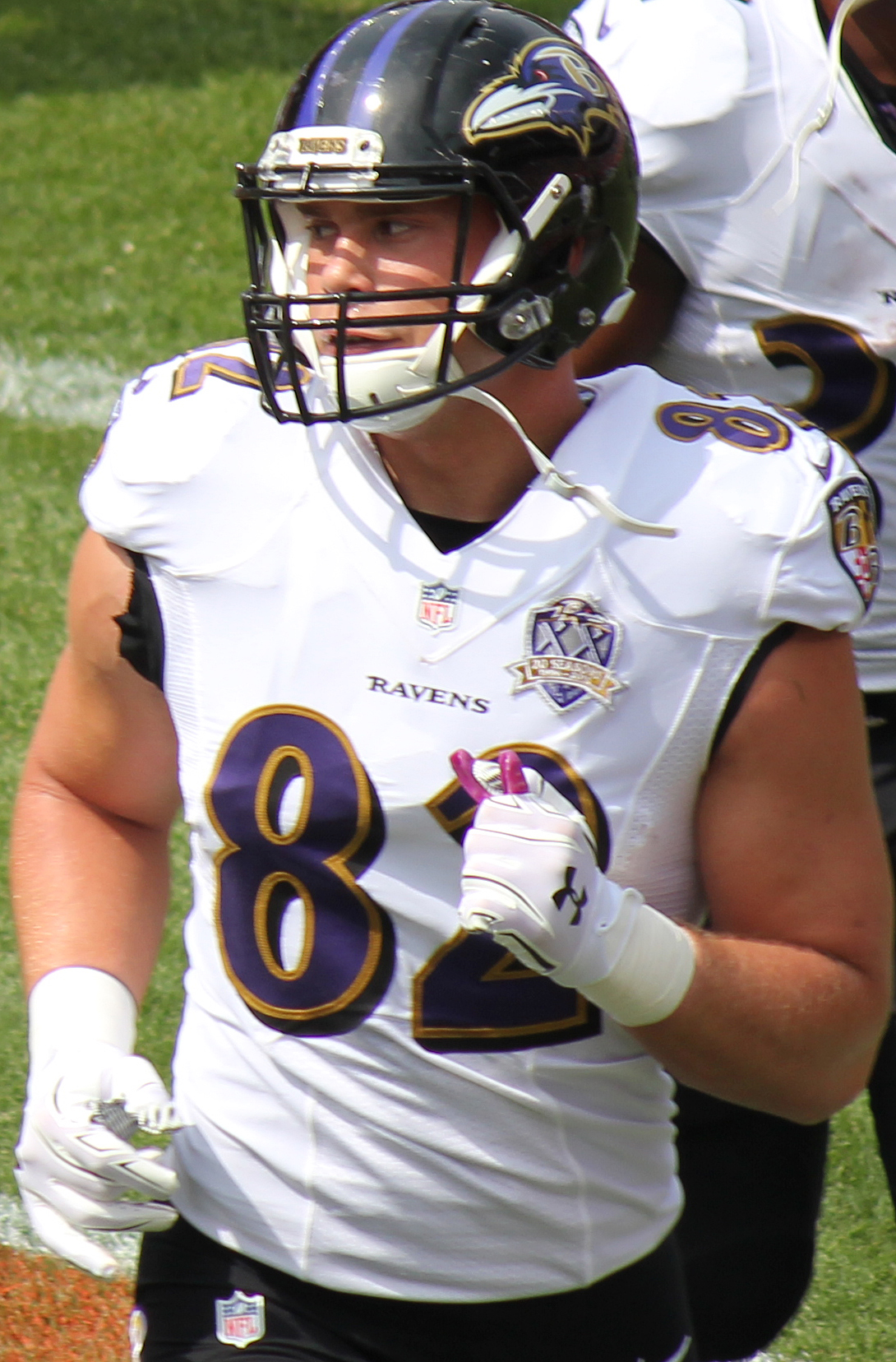
- Boyle with the Baltimore Ravens in 2015

No. 82, 86
- Position: Tight end

Personal information
- Born: February 17, 1993 (age 33); Wantage Township, New Jersey, U.S.
- Listed height: 6 ft 4 in (1.93 m)
- Listed weight: 261 lb (118 kg)

Career information
- High school: High Point Regional (Sussex, New Jersey)
- College: Delaware (2011–2014)
- NFL draft: 2015: 5th round, 171st overall pick

Career history
- Baltimore Ravens (2015–2022)

Career NFL statistics
- Receptions: 121
- Receiving yards: 1,049
- Receiving touchdowns: 4
- Stats at Pro Football Reference

Nicholas Ryan Boyle (born February 17, 1993) is an American former professional football player who was a tight end in the National Football League (NFL). He played college football for the Delaware Fightin' Blue Hens and was selected by the Baltimore Ravens in the fifth round of the 2015 NFL draft.

Boyle was a talented blocker and was a major contributor to the success that the Ravens had with their run game during his time with the team. He is considered one of the top NFL blocking tight ends of his era.

== College career ==
Boyle played college football at the University of Delaware from 2011 to 2014.

== Professional career ==
=== Pre-draft ===
On November 24, 2014, it was announced that Boyle had accepted his invitation to play in the 2015 Senior Bowl. He became the fourth player from Delaware to appear in the Senior Bowl and first since Joe Flacco in 2008. Throughout the week leading up to the Senior Bowl, Boyle performed well at practice and showed scouts and teams his versatility, blocking capability, and his receiving ability. On January 24, 2015, Boyle caught two passes for 31 yards, leading all tight ends, and helped the North defeat the South 34–13. He accepted his invitation to the NFL Combine and was one of the 19 tight ends invited. Boyle completed all of the required combine and positional drills. His performance was described by media and analysts as mediocre as he finished last in the 40-yard dash among tight ends and dropped a few passes during positional drills. Boyle finished first among tight ends in the 60-yard shuttle and 20-yard shuttle, eighth in the broad jump, ninth in the vertical jump, and tied for fifth in the bench press. On March 12, 2015, Boyle opted to participate at Delaware's pro day, along with 11 other teammates. He ran his 40-yard dash (5.00), 20-yard dash (2.85), 10-yard dash (1.65), and also performed positional drills. Scouts and representatives from 22 NFL teams attended, including tight ends coaches from the New York Jets, Indianapolis Colts, and Detroit Lions. At the conclusion of the pre-draft process, Boyle was projected to be a fifth or sixth round pick by the majority of NFL draft experts and scouts. He was ranked the 11th best tight end prospect in the draft by NFLDraftScout.com.

Pre-draft measurables
Height	Weight	Arm length	Hand span	40-yard dash	10-yard split	20-yard split	20-yard shuttle	Three-cone drill	Vertical jump	Broad jump	Bench press
6 ft 4 1/2 in (1.94 m)	268 lb (122 kg)	33 3/8 in (0.85 m)	10 3/8 in (0.26 m)	5.04 s	1.81 s	2.98 s	4.23 s	7.13 s	30 1/2 in (0.77 m)	9 ft 4 in (2.84 m)	20 reps
All values from NFL Combine

=== 2015 ===
The Baltimore Ravens selected Boyle in the fifth round with the 171st overall pick in the 2015 NFL draft. He was the ninth tight end selected in the draft and the second tight end selected by the Ravens, with the first being Minnesota's Maxx Williams (second round, 55th overall). He was the 27th player to be drafted from Delaware and became teammates with fellow Delaware alumnus Joe Flacco.

On May 7, 2015, the Baltimore Ravens signed Boyle to a four-year, $2.44 million contract that includes a signing bonus of $166,254.

He competed with Maxx Williams, Crockett Gillmore, Dennis Pitta, and Konrad Reuland throughout training camp for the vacant starting tight end position left by the departure of Owen Daniels.

He made his professional regular season debut in the Ravens' season-opening 19–13 loss to the Denver Broncos. On September 27, 2015, Boyle caught two passes for 19 yards during a 28–24 loss to the Cincinnati Bengals. He made the first reception of his career on a six-yard pass from Joe Flacco in the second quarter. On October 1, 2015, Boyle made his first career start and caught three passes for 12 receiving yards in a 23–20 victory at the Pittsburgh Steelers. During a Week 10 matchup against the Jacksonville Jaguars, he had three receptions for a season-high 35 receiving yards in the Ravens' 22–20 loss.

On December 7, 2015, it was reported that the NFL would suspend Boyle for four games after violating the NFL's performance-enhancing drug policy. He was required to forfeit his salary for four games, equaling $112,132. Boyle was immediately suspended and missed Weeks 14–17. He finished the season with a total of 18 receptions for 153 receiving yards in 11 games and two starts.

=== 2016 ===
On February 19, 2016, it was announced that Boyle would be suspended for the first ten games of the 2016 season for his second violation of the performance-enhancing drug policy. His was activated to the Ravens' active roster on November 26, 2016, prior to Week 12.

On December 4, 2016, Boyle caught two passes for a season-high 24 yards as the Ravens routed the Miami Dolphins 38–6. The following week, he had a season-high three receptions for 15 yards in a 30–23 loss against the New England Patriots. Boyle finished the 2016 season with six receptions for 44 receiving yards in six games and zero starts.

=== 2017 ===
Throughout training camp, Boyle competed with Benjamin Watson, Dennis Pitta, Crockett Gillmore, Maxx Williams, Larry Donnell, and Ryan Malleck for the job as the starting tight end. Head coach John Harbaugh named him the starter for the beginning of the season after Gilmore suffered a torn MCL and Pitta retired after suffering another hip injury.

He started the Ravens' season-opener at the Bengals and had one catch for 14 yards in their 20–0 victory. On October 1, 2017, he caught a career-high five passes for 36 receiving yards in the Ravens 26–9 loss to the Steelers. He missed a Week 9 contest at the Tennessee Titans after suffering a toe injury. He finished the 2017 season with 28 receptions for 203 receiving yards.

=== 2018–2022 ===
After competing with Maxx Williams and rookies Hayden Hurst and Mark Andrews, Boyle was named the starting tight end to begin the season. Despite being outplayed by the rookie Andrews, Boyle finished the season with 23 receptions for a career-high 213 yards.

On March 7, 2019, Boyle signed a three-year, $18 million contract extension with the Ravens through the 2021 season. Boyle caught his first career touchdown during a Week 9 37–20 victory over the Patriots. He caught his second career touchdown in a Week 14 24-17 win over the Buffalo Bills. Overall, Boyle finished the 2019 season with 31 receptions for 321 receiving yards and two receiving touchdowns.

In Week 10, Boyle was tackled at the knees, causing the left knee to dislocate inward. He was placed on injured reserve on November 17, 2020. Boyle had 13 receptions for 109 yards and two touchdowns on the season.

On January 29, 2021, Boyle agreed to a two-year, $13 million contract extension with the Ravens. This new deal keeps Boyle in contract through the end of the 2023 season. On September 10, 2021, Boyle was placed on short-term injured reserve to start the season. He was activated on November 8, 2021.

Boyle was waived by the Ravens on January 7, 2023, but re-signed to the team's practice squad three days later.

On March 30, 2023, Boyle announced that he was switching from tight end to long snapper. On May 15, Boyle was hosted by the Pittsburgh Steelers for a free agent workout, his first professional action as a long snapper.

Boyle primarily acts as a blocker on offense and special teams, rather than an offensive target, and was considered a key part of the Ravens' rushing success since Lamar Jackson became the team's starting quarterback. He is considered one of the top blocking tight ends in the NFL.
