= Maxx Williams =

American football player (born 1994)

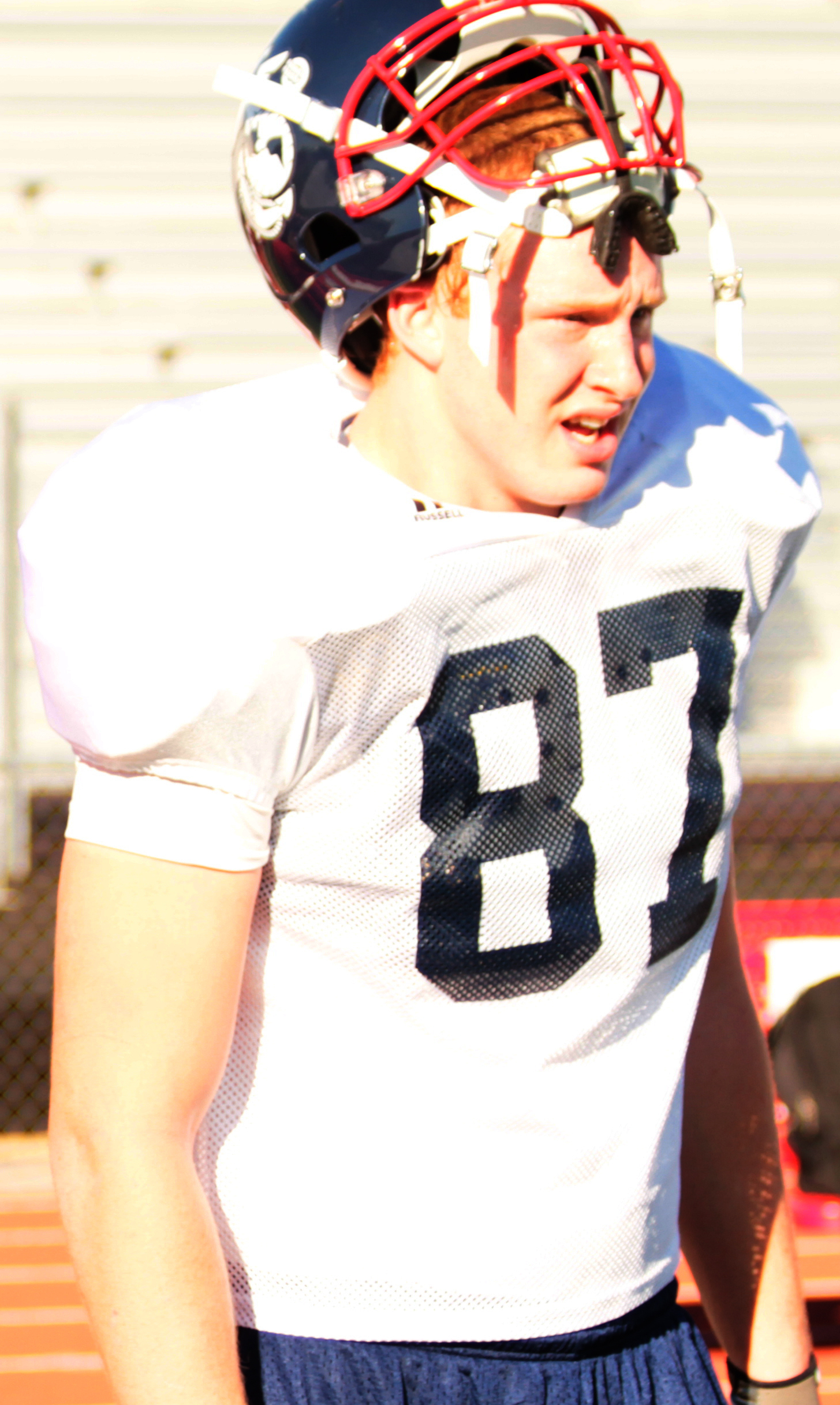
- Williams in 2012

No. 87
- Position: Tight end

Personal information
- Born: April 12, 1994 (age 32); Waconia, Minnesota, U.S.
- Listed height: 6 ft 4 in (1.93 m)
- Listed weight: 252 lb (114 kg)

Career information
- High school: Waconia
- College: Minnesota (2012–2014)
- NFL draft: 2015: 2nd round, 55th overall pick

Career history
- Baltimore Ravens (2015–2018); Arizona Cardinals (2019–2022)

Awards and highlights
- First-team All-American (2014); Big Ten Tight End of the Year (2014); First-team All-Big Ten (2014)

Career NFL statistics
- Receptions: 105
- Receiving yards: 1,012
- Receiving touchdowns: 6
- Stats at Pro Football Reference

Maxx Williams (born April 12, 1994) is an American former professional football player who was a tight end in the National Football League (NFL). He played college football for the Minnesota Golden Gophers, earning first-team All-American honors in 2014. He was selected by the Baltimore Ravens in the second round of the 2015 NFL draft.

== College career ==
Williams was redshirted in his first year at the University of Minnesota in 2012. As a redshirt freshman in 2013, he started seven of 13 games, recording 25 receptions for 417 yards and five touchdowns. As a sophomore in 2014, he finished the year with 36 receptions for 569 yards and eight touchdowns. Williams was a finalist for the John Mackey Award.

Williams entered the 2015 NFL draft after his redshirt sophomore season, forgoing his junior and senior seasons.

== Professional career ==
=== Pre-draft ===
The NFL draft advisory board recommended Williams return to school, but he chose to forgo his junior and senior season and enter the draft. The upcoming draft class lacked depth at the tight end position with Williams as the only tight end projected to go in the first two rounds. During the lead up to the draft, Williams worked out with Minnesota Vikings tight end Kyle Rudolph. Williams received an invitation to the NFL Combine and completed all of the required combine and positional drills. Williams finished third among tight ends in the 40-yard dash. He had an impressive performance and was able to distinguish himself as the top tight end over Miami's Clive Walford. On March 2, 2015, he opted to participate at Minnesota's pro day, along with David Cobb, Cedric Thompson, and 11 other teammates. He stood on his combine results and chose to only perform positional drills for team representatives and scouts from 20 NFL teams. His pro day performance was described as impressive by multiple scouts and representatives. At the conclusion of the pre-draft process, Williams was projected to be a second or third round pick by the majority of NFL draft experts and scouts. He was ranked the top tight end in the draft by NFL analysts Charles Davis, Mike Mayock, Lance Zierlein, NFLDraftScout.com, and Sports Illustrated.

Pre-draft measurables
| Height | Weight | Arm length | Hand span | 40-yard dash | 10-yard split | 20-yard split | 20-yard shuttle | Three-cone drill | Vertical jump | Broad jump | Bench press |
|---|---|---|---|---|---|---|---|---|---|---|---|
| 6 ft 3 7/8 in (1.93 m) | 249 lb (113 kg) | 33 1/2 in (0.85 m) | 10 3/8 in (0.26 m) | 4.78 s | 1.77 s | 2.88 s | 4.37 s | 7.30 s | 34 1/2 in (0.88 m) | 9 ft 9 in (2.97 m) | 17 reps |
All values from NFL Combine

=== Baltimore Ravens ===
==== 2015 ====
The Baltimore Ravens selected Williams in the second round (55th overall) of the 2015 NFL draft. The Ravens traded their second round pick (58th overall) and fifth round pick (158th overall) to the Arizona Cardinals in order to move up three spots to select Williams. They initialized the trade after multiple reports suggested that the Pittsburgh Steelers were going to select Williams with their second round pick (56th overall). Afterwards, Steelers' general manager Kevin Colbert denied the claim, stating they were planning to select Senquez Golson either way. The Ravens also chose Delaware tight end Nick Boyle in the fifth round (171st overall).

On May 7, 2015, the Ravens signed Williams to a four-year, $4.05 million contract that includes $1.82 million guaranteed and a signing bonus of $1.20 million.

Throughout his first training camp with the Ravens, he competed against Crockett Gillmore, Nick Boyle, Dennis Pitta, and Konrad Reuland for the vacant job as the starting tight end after Owen Daniels departed in free agency. He was named the Ravens' second tight end behind Gilmore to begin the regular season.

He made his professional regular season debut in the Ravens' season-opener at the Denver Broncos and made his first career reception on an 11-yard pass by Joe Flacco during their 19–13 loss. The following week, Williams made his first career start and caught one pass for eight yards in a 37–33 loss at the Oakland Raiders. On November 15, 2015, Williams made four receptions for 40 receiving yards and caught his first career touchdown during a 22–20 loss to the Jacksonville Jaguars. His first career touchdown reception came in the second quarter on a 21-yard pass by Joe Flacco. Williams was inactive in Week 7 and limited in Week 8 after suffering a knee and ankle injury.

On November 30, 2015, Williams suffered a concussion in the fourth quarter of a 33–27 victory at the Cleveland Browns. He was unable to play the following week at the Miami Dolphins (Week 13). On January 3, 2016, he caught a season-high six passes for 53 yards in a 24–16 loss at the Cincinnati Bengals. During the game, Bengals' linebacker Vontaze Burfict blindsided Williams while he was running a route in the end zone on the opposite side of where the actual play was happening. Burfict was fined $50,000 and was heavily scrutinized for leading with the crown of his helmet to Williams' chin and neck. He finished the season with 32 receptions, 268 receiving yards and a touchdown in seven starts and 14 games.

==== 2016 ====
He competed with Gilmore, Dennis Pitta, and Nick Boyle throughout training camp for the job as the second tight end. The Ravens had signed Benjamin Watson during free agency to assume the job as the starting tight end. During the Ravens' third preseason game, Watson suffered a torn achilles tendon. Head coach John Harbaugh named Williams the third tight end to begin the regular season, behind Dennis Pitta and Gilmore.

On October 7, 2016, Williams was placed on injured reserve with a knee injury. The knee injury required surgery to remove cartilage and he was estimated to miss a minimum of eight weeks or possibly the remainder of the season. He finished the 2016 season without any catches and appeared in only four games.

==== 2017 ====
He competed with Benjamin Watson, Dennis Pitta, Gilmore, Nick Boyle, Ryan Malleck, and Larry Donnell for the role as the starting tight end. He was named the third tight end behind Boyle and Watson to start the season after Dennis Pitta retired due to another hip injury and Gilmore was placed on injured/reserve with a torn MCL.

He started the Ravens' season-opener at the Bengals and made one reception for five yards during their 20–0 victory. The following week, he caught a season-high four passes for 21 yards as the Ravens defeated the Browns 24–10. Williams also had his first career rushing attempt for a two-yard gain during the victory. Unfortunately, Williams also suffered an injury to his left ankle during the course of the game and was unable to play in the next three games (Weeks 3–5). On October 15, 2017, Williams returned from injury and caught a six-yard pass during the Ravens' 27–24 loss to the Chicago Bears. After catching the pass from Joe Flacco, Williams attempted to fight for extra yardage and fumbled the ball. He also aggravated his ankle injury during the play and missed the next two games (Weeks 7–8). During a Week 9 matchup at the Tennessee Titans, Williams caught three passes for a season-high 29 yards in a 23–20 loss.

==== 2018 ====
In 2018, Williams appeared in 13 games for the Ravens and caught 16 passes for 143 yards and a touchdown.

=== Arizona Cardinals ===
==== 2019 ====
On May 3, 2019, Williams signed with the Arizona Cardinals.

Williams was named a starting tight end to start the season. On November 16, 2019, he signed a two-year contract extension with the Cardinals. Williams finished the 2019 season with 15 receptions for 202 yards and one receiving touchdown.

==== 2020 ====
Williams was placed on the active/non-football illness list at the start of training camp on August 2, 2020, and was activated two days later. He was placed on injured reserve on September 21, 2020, with an ankle injury. He was activated on November 7, 2020. Williams finished the 2020 season with 8 receptions for 102 yards and one receiving touchdown.

==== 2021 ====
Williams entered the 2021 season as the Cardinals starting tight end. He suffered a torn ACL in Week 5 and was placed on season-ending injured reserve. Williams finished the 2021 season with 16 receptions for 193 yards and one receiving touchdown.

==== 2022 ====
On March 16, 2022, Williams re-signed with the Cardinals on a one-year deal. He was released on October 7. He was signed back to the practice squad three days later. He was signed to the active roster on December 14, 2022.

== NFL career statistics ==
=== Regular season ===
| Year | Team | Games | | Receiving | | | | | Fumbles | |
| Year | Team | GP | GS | Rec | Yds | Avg | Lng | TD | Fum | Lost |
|---|---|---|---|---|---|---|---|---|---|---|
| 2015 | BAL | 14 | 7 | 32 | 268 | 8.4 | 28 | 1 | 1 | 0 |
| 2016 | BAL | 4 | 0 | 0 | 0 | 0.0 | 0 | 0 | 0 | 0 |
| 2017 | BAL | 11 | 8 | 15 | 86 | 5.7 | 17 | 1 | 1 | 1 |
| 2018 | BAL | 13 | 6 | 16 | 143 | 8.9 | 25 | 1 | 0 | 0 |
| 2019 | ARI | 16 | 10 | 15 | 202 | 13.5 | 28 | 1 | 0 | 0 |
| 2020 | ARI | 9 | 8 | 8 | 102 | 12.8 | 42 | 1 | 0 | 0 |
| 2021 | ARI | 5 | 5 | 16 | 193 | 12.1 | 34 | 1 | 0 | 0 |
| 2022 | ARI | 11 | 3 | 3 | 18 | 6 | 7 | 0 | 0 | 0 |
| Total | | 79 | 44 | 105 | 1,012 | 9.6 | 42 | 6 | 2 | 1 |
Source: NFL.com

=== Postseason ===
| Year | Team | Games | | Receiving | | | | | Fumbles | |
| Year | Team | GP | GS | Rec | Yds | Avg | Lng | TD | Fum | Lost |
|---|---|---|---|---|---|---|---|---|---|---|
| 2018 | BAL | 1 | 1 | 1 | 8 | 8.0 | 8 | 0 | 0 | 0 |
| 2021 | ARI | 0 | 0 | Did not play due to injury | | | | | | |
| Total | | 1 | 1 | 1 | 8 | 8.0 | 8 | 0 | 0 | 0 |
Source: pro-football-reference.com

== Personal life ==
His father, Brian Williams, and his grandfather, Robert Williams, played in the NFL. Brian Williams was a three-year letterman at center at Minnesota and was selected in the first round (18th overall) by the New York Giants in the 1989 NFL draft. Robert Williams was a quarterback at Notre Dame and was selected by the Chicago Bears in the 1959 NFL draft. His mother, Rochelle Williams, played volleyball at Minnesota (1984–87). His uncle, Ron Goetz, also played football at Minnesota and played two seasons in the World League of American Football and was an All-Star in the Canadian Football League.
