= List of Georgia Southern Eagles in the NFL draft =

This is a list of Georgia Southern Eagles football players in the NFL draft.

== Key ==
B	Back	K	Kicker	NT	Nose tackle
C	Center	LB	Linebacker	FB	Fullback
DB	Defensive back	P	Punter	HB	Halfback
DE	Defensive end	QB	Quarterback	WR	Wide receiver
DT	Defensive tackle	RB	Running back	G	Guard
E	End	T	Offensive tackle	TE	Tight end

== Selections ==
Year	Round	Pick	Player	Team	Position
1987	9	240	Tracy Ham	Los Angeles Rams	RB
1987	12	332	Fred Stokes	Los Angeles Rams	DE
1988	10	275	Tim Foley	San Francisco 49ers	K
1989	12	329	Terry Young	Tampa Bay Buccaneers	DB
1990	11	291	Ernest Thompson	Kansas City Chiefs	RB
2000	5	159	Kiwaukee Thomas	Jacksonville Jaguars	DB
2002	6	199	Adrian Peterson	Chicago Bears	RB
2003	6	179	David Young	Jacksonville Jaguars	DB
2013	3	80	J. J. Wilcox	Dallas Cowboys	DB
2014	3	96	Jerick McKinnon	Minnesota Vikings	RB
2014	7	252	Lavelle Westbrooks	Cincinnati Bengals	DB
2016	5	169	Antwione Williams	Detroit Lions	LB
2017	5	183	Ukeme Eligwe	Kansas City Chiefs	LB
2020	5	163	Kindle Vildor	Chicago Bears	DB
2020	6	188	Tyler Bass	Buffalo Bills	K
