= Konrad Reuland =

American football player (1987–2016)

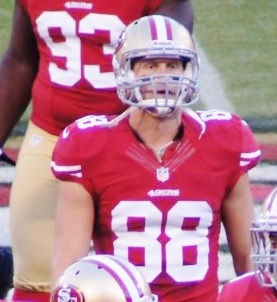
- Reuland with the San Francisco 49ers in 2012

No. 88, 87, 86
- Position: Tight end

Personal information
- Born: April 4, 1987; Springfield, Ohio, U.S.
- Died: December 12, 2016 (aged 29); Los Angeles, California, U.S.
- Listed height: 6 ft 5 in (1.96 m)
- Listed weight: 254 lb (115 kg)

Career information
- High school: Mission Viejo (CA)
- College: Notre Dame (2006–2007); Stanford (2009–2010)
- NFL draft: 2011: undrafted

Career history
- San Francisco 49ers (2011–2012)*; New York Jets (2012–2013); Indianapolis Colts (2014)*; Baltimore Ravens (2014–2015); Indianapolis Colts (2016)*
- * Offseason or practice squad member only

Career NFL statistics
- Receptions: 12
- Receiving yards: 90
- Stats at Pro Football Reference

Konrad Albert Reuland (April 4, 1987 – December 12, 2016) was an American professional football tight end who played in the National Football League (NFL). He played college football for the Notre Dame Fighting Irish and Stanford Cardinal. Undrafted out of college, he signed with the San Francisco 49ers in 2011, and was also a member of the New York Jets, Indianapolis Colts, and Baltimore Ravens.

== Early life and college ==
Konrad Albert Reuland was born in Springfield, Ohio, the son of Canadian-born Ralf Volker Reuland and Illinois-born Mary Arlene Reuland (née Puchalski). Reuland attended Mater Dei High School in Santa Ana, California, helping their basketball team to reach the California Interscholastic Federation Southern Section and state championships as a freshman in 2003. Before his sophomore year, he transferred to Mission Viejo High School in Mission Viejo, California, and played for their gridiron football team. With Reuland, Mission Viejo had a 39–2 win–loss record. He also continued playing basketball for Mission Viejo, and graduated in 2006.

Reuland enrolled at the University of Notre Dame to play college football for the Notre Dame Fighting Irish in 2006 and 2007. He transferred to Stanford University in 2008, and sat out for the season according to transfer rules. In 2009, he appeared in 13 games for the Stanford Cardinal, catching six passes for 142 yards. Reuland recorded 21 receptions for 209 yards with Stanford in 2010.

== Professional career ==
Reuland signed as an undrafted free agent with the San Francisco 49ers in 2011. The 49ers kept Reuland on their practice squad for the 2011 season. Reuland was claimed off waivers by the New York Jets on September 1, 2012. During the 2012 season, Reuland had 11 receptions for 83 yards, the longest for 18. He was placed on the injured reserve list with a knee injury on November 19, 2013. Reuland signed with the Indianapolis Colts on October 21, 2014. He was released on October 30.

The Baltimore Ravens signed Reuland to their practice squad on November 12, 2014. On September 5, 2015, he was released by the Ravens. He signed with the Ravens' practice squad the following day, and was released on September 8. On October 13, 2015, the Ravens re-signed Reuland to the practice squad. On November 4, 2015, Reuland was released. On November 18, he was re-signed to the practice squad. On December 8, the Ravens promoted Reuland to the active roster after Crockett Gillmore and Maxx Williams went down with injuries and Nick Boyle was suspended for the remainder of the season. On July 31, 2016, Reuland was signed by the Colts. He played in three preseason games for the Colts, making one catch for ten yards. He was released on August 29.

== Personal life ==
Reuland was a close friend of NFL quarterback Mark Sanchez. The two had known each other since elementary school, and were high school football teammates at Mission Viejo in addition to later being NFL teammates on the Jets.

Reuland suffered a brain aneurysm on November 28, 2016, and underwent surgery the following day. He died on December 12 at the UCLA Medical Center. His heart and one of his kidneys were donated and transplanted into MLB Hall of Fame player Rod Carew, Konrad’s childhood hero whom he met in his youth. His other kidney and liver were donated and transplanted into two other people.

== See also ==
- List of American football players who died during their career
