= Bobby Richardson (gridiron football) =

American football player (born 1992)

No. 78, 68, 74, 96, 73, 91
- Position: Defensive tackle

Personal information
- Born: November 30, 1992 (age 33); Tampa, Florida, U.S.
- Listed height: 6 ft 3 in (1.91 m)
- Listed weight: 286 lb (130 kg)

Career information
- High school: Plant (Tampa)
- College: Indiana
- NFL draft: 2015: undrafted

Career history
- New Orleans Saints (2015–2016); Washington Redskins (2016)*; Kansas City Chiefs (2016)*; Denver Broncos (2017)*; New York Giants (2017)*; Hamilton Tiger-Cats (2018); Tampa Bay Vipers (2020)
- * Offseason or practice squad member only

Career NFL statistics
- Tackles: 40
- Sacks: 0.5
- Forced fumbles: 0
- Interceptions: 1
- Stats at Pro Football Reference
- Stats at CFL.ca

Bobby Richardson (born November 30, 1992) is an American former professional football player who was a defensive end in the National Football League (NFL). He was signed by the New Orleans Saints as an undrafted free agent in 2015. He played college football for the Indiana Hoosiers.

== Professional career ==
=== New Orleans Saints ===
Richardson signed with the New Orleans Saints as an undrafted rookie free agent in 2015. Richardson started 2015 as a starting defensive end for the Saints. In the Saints' Week 15 matchup against the Jacksonville Jaguars, Richardson recorded his first career interception. Saints cornerback Delvin Breaux tipped a ball thrown by Jaguar quarterback Blake Bortles and it flew through the air, allowing Richardson to catch it. On September 3, 2016, he was waived by the Saints. He was then signed to the Saints' practice squad. On September 14, 2016, he was released from their practice squad.

=== Washington Redskins ===
On September 19, 2016, Richardson was signed to the Washington Redskins' practice squad. He was released on October 19, 2016.

=== Kansas City Chiefs ===
Richardson was signed to the Kansas City Chiefs practice squad on October 26, 2016. He was released on November 9, 2016.

=== Denver Broncos ===
On February 24, 2017, Richardson signed with the Broncos. On May 3, 2017, Richardson was waived by the Broncos.

=== New York Giants ===
On August 15, 2017, Richardson signed with the New York Giants. He was waived on September 2, 2017.

=== Hamilton Tiger-Cats ===
Richardson signed with the Hamilton Tiger-Cats of the Canadian Football League on April 20, 2018. He re-signed with the team on December 6, 2018, but retired on May 6, 2019.

=== Tampa Bay Vipers ===
In October 2019, Richardson was among the Tampa Bay Vipers' open-round choices in the 2020 XFL draft. He had his contract terminated when the league suspended operations on April 10, 2020.
