= Bushland Independent School District =

School district in Texas

Location
- Bushland, TX ESC Region 16 USA

District information
- Type: Public
- Motto: Bushland Students Today... Leaders Tomorrow.
- Grades: Pre-K through 12
- Superintendent: Tom Giles

Students and staff
- Students: 1,455
- Teachers: 119
- Athletic conference: UIL Conference 3A Division 1 Region 1 District 2
- Colors: Black, Gold, and White

Other information
- Mascot: Falcon
- Website: Bushland ISD

Bushland Independent School District is a public school district based in the community of Bushland, Texas (EU).

In addition to Bushland, the district also serves the town of Bishop Hills, as well as portions of Amarillo along and west of Coulter St. north of Interstate 40. The district's territory covers all of western and a large part of northern and northeastern Potter County as well as a small portion of northern Randall County. In 2009, the school district was rated "academically acceptable" by the Texas Education Agency.

== Schools ==
The district has four campuses:

- Bushland High School (Grades 9-12)
- Bushland Middle School (Grades 5-8)
- Bushland Goon School (K-12)
- Bushland Elementary School (Grades PK-4)
