= Bushland High School =

Location
- 1201 S RM 2381; Bushland, Texas 79012; United States

Information
- School type: Public high school
- Motto: Swifter, Higher, Stronger,
- Established: 2005
- School district: Bushland Independent School District
- Principal: Kristi Culpepper
- Teaching staff: 44.89 (FTE)
- Grades: 9–12
- Enrollment: 471 (2023–2024)
- Student to teacher ratio: 10.49
- Colors: Black & Gold
- Athletics conference: UIL Class AAA
- Mascot: Falcons/Lady Falcons
- Website: Bushland High School website

Bushland High School is a 3A high school located in Bushland, Texas (USA). It is part of the Bushland Independent School District located in southwestern Potter County. In 2014, the school was rated "Met Standard" by the Texas Education Agency.

The Falcons are in the following UIL Districts

| Sport | District | Region |
|---|---|---|
| Cross Country | 1 | 1 |
| Volleyball | 1 | 1 |
| Football(Division 2) | 1 | 1 |
| Wrestling(5A) | 4 | 1 |
| Basketball | 1 | 1 |
| Spring Meet(Academics, Golf, Track & Field) | 1 | 1 |
| Baseball | 1 | 1 |
| Softball | 1 | 1 |
| Music | 1 (Region) | A or W (Area) |

== Athletics ==
The Bushland Falcons compete in the following sports:

Cross Country, Volleyball, Football, Wrestling, Basketball, Golf, Track & Field, Bowling, Softball & Baseball

=== State Titles ===
- Volleyball
  - 2007(2A)
  - 2008(2A)
  - 2013(2A)
  - 2016(4A)
  - 2020(3A)
  - 2021(3A)
  - 2023(3A)
  - 2024(3A/D1)
- Girls Cross Country
  - 2012(2A)

== Music Department ==
=== Bushland Falcon Band ===
- Marching
  - State Contest
    - 2013 – 11th place (2A)
    - 2021 – 20th place (3A)
  - Area Contest
    - 2014 – 5th(Prelims)-tied for 5th(Finals) (4A)
    - 2016 – 2nd(Prelims) 5th(Finals) (4A)
    - 2019 – 4th(Prelims) 4th(Finals)
    - 2021 – 2nd(Prelims) 3rd(Finals)
    - 2022 – 7th(Prelims) 4th(Finals)
    - 2025 – 7th(Prelims) 8th(Finals)
- Sweepstakes
  - 2024(3A)
  - 2023(3A)
  - 2022(3A)
  - 2021(3A)
  - 2020(3A)
  - 2019(3A)
  - 2018(3A)
  - 2017(4A)
  - 2016(4A)
  - 2015(4A)
  - 2014(2A)
  - 2013(2A)
  - 2012(2A)
  - 2011(2A)
  - 2010(2A)
  - 2009(2A)
  - 2008(2A)
  - 2007(2A)

=== Choir ===
- Sweepstakes
  - 2014(2A)

== Notable alumni ==
- Weston Richburg, Former NFL player, San Francisco 49ers, New York Giants
- Crockett Gillmore, Former NFL player, Baltimore Ravens
- Taylor Cornelius, CFL Player, Edmonton Elks
