= Ray Sherman =

American football coach (born 1951)

Personal information
- Born: November 27, 1951 (age 74); Berkeley, California, U.S.

Career information
- College: Fresno State

Career history
- San Jose State (1974) Graduate assistant; California (1975) Defensive backs coach; Michigan State (1976–1977) Tight ends coach; Wake Forest (1978–1980) Running backs coach; California (1981) Running backs coach; Purdue (1982–1985) Running backs coach; Georgia (1986–1987) Wide receivers coach; Houston Oilers (1988–1989); Running backs coach (1988); Wide receivers coach (1989); Atlanta Falcons (1990) Assistant head coach; San Francisco 49ers (1991–1993); Running backs coach (1991); Wide receivers coach (1992–1993); New York Jets (1994) Offensive coordinator; Minnesota Vikings (1995–1997) Quarterbacks coach; Pittsburgh Steelers (1998) Offensive coordinator; Minnesota Vikings (1999) Offensive coordinator; Green Bay Packers (2000–2004) Wide receivers coach; Tennessee Titans (2005–2006) Wide receivers coach; Dallas Cowboys (2007–2010) Wide receivers coach; St. Louis Rams (2012–2015) Wide receivers coach; Pittsburgh Steelers (2019) Interim wide receivers coach; Vegas Vipers (2023) Wide receivers coach
- Coaching profile at Pro Football Reference

Ray Sherman (November 27, 1951) is an American football coach. Sherman has more than four decades of coaching at the college and professional levels.

== Coaching career ==
=== College career ===
Sherman played college football at Fresno State as a wide receiver and defensive back. In 1974, he took a job as graduate assistant for San Jose State. After leaving San Jose State following that season, Sherman remained a coach at the college level through 1987, working for five additional schools; this includes two stints at California.

=== NFL career ===
The Houston Oilers gave Sherman his first NFL coaching job in 1988, when he was hired as a running backs coach. After one more year in Houston, during which he was a wide receivers coach, he took an assistant head coaching position with the Atlanta Falcons in 1990. Sherman then went to the San Francisco 49ers the next season, staying there through 1993; he coached running backs in 1991 and wide receivers the following two seasons. The Minnesota Vikings hired Sherman as quarterbacks coach in 1995, and he spent three seasons with the team. In 1998 and 1999, Sherman served as offensive coordinator of the Pittsburgh Steelers and Vikings, respectively. He was the wide receivers coach of the Green Bay Packers from 2000 to 2004, and held the same position with the Tennessee Titans in 2005 and 2006. The Dallas Cowboys hired him as wide receivers coach in 2007.

In January 2010, Sherman was considered for a head coaching position with the Oakland Raiders.

In January 2011, Sherman interviewed for the head coaching position of the Dallas Cowboys to satisfy the Rooney Rule, and it was thought that he might be offered the offensive coordinator job with the team. It was announced that Sherman would not return to the Cowboys for the 2011 season. In 2019, Sherman served as the Steelers interim wide receivers coach for the season following the death of the incumbent coach Darryl Drake that August.

Sherman was officially hired by the Vegas Vipers on September 13, 2022 On January 1, 2024, it was announced the Vipers would not be a part of the UFL Merger.

== Personal life ==
Sherman is married and is the father of three children, one of whom died in 2003.
