= De'Veon Smith =

American football player (born 1994)

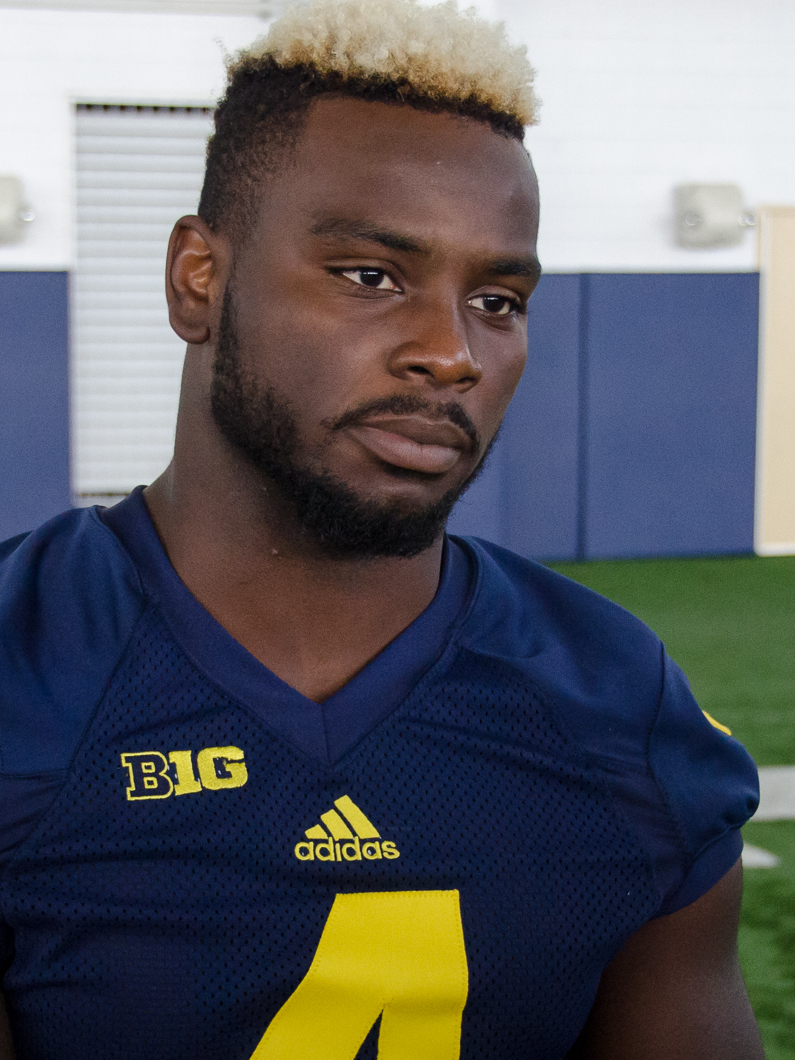
- Smith in 2014

Profile
- Position: Running back

Personal information
- Born: November 8, 1994 (age 31); Warren, Ohio, U.S.
- Listed height: 5 ft 11 in (1.80 m)
- Listed weight: 223 lb (101 kg)

Career information
- High school: Howland (Warren)
- College: Michigan (2013–2016)
- NFL draft: 2017: undrafted

Career history
- Miami Dolphins (2017); Washington Redskins (2018)*; Orlando Apollos (2019); Tampa Bay Vipers (2020); BC Lions (2021)*; Pittsburgh Maulers (2022)*; Arlington Renegades (2023–2025)
- * Offseason or practice squad member only

Awards and highlights
- XFL champion (2023); XFL rushing touchdowns co-leader (2023); XFL rushing yards leader (2020)

Career NFL statistics
- Receptions: 3
- Receiving yards: 27
- Stats at Pro Football Reference

De'Veon Le'trell Smith (born November 8, 1994) is an American professional football running back. He played college football at Michigan, and was signed as an undrafted free agent by the Miami Dolphins in 2017. He has also played for the Orlando Apollos of the Alliance of American Football (AAF) and Tampa Bay Vipers of the XFL. He later played for the BC Lions, the Pittsburgh Maulers, and the Arlington Renegades, winning an XFL championship in 2023.

== Early life ==
Smith was born in 1994. He attended Howland High School in Warren, Ohio. He set the career rushing record for Trumbull County, Ohio, with 6,750 rushing yards at Howland High School. He was a finalist for Ohio's "Mr. Football" award.

== College career ==
In March 2012, prior to his senior year in high school, Smith announced that he had committed to play college football for the University of Michigan. He also received collegiate offers from Bowling Green, Indiana, Ohio State, Penn State, Purdue, and West Virginia. As a freshman in 2013, Smith appeared in twelve games and had twenty-six carries for 117 yards.

As a sophomore in 2014, Smith led Michigan with 519 rushing yards on 108 carries. In the opening game of the 2014 season, Smith carried the ball eight times for 115 yards. He also scored two touchdowns and had a run of sixty-one yards. Derrick Green also rushed for 170 yards in the game, as Smith and Green became the first pair of Michigan running backs to rush for over 100 yards in the same game since 2007.

During the 2015 season, Smith was again Michigan's leading rusher with 753 yards and six touchdowns on 180 carries and emerged as one of the star players in Jim Harbaugh’s first year at the helm.

Through the first eleven games of the 2016 season, Smith led Michigan with 750 rushing yards and ten touchdowns on 144 carries. On November 19, 2016, the 10-1 Wolverines were struggling against Indiana, and Smith proceeded to put the team on his back. He rushed for a career-high 158 yards and had two momentum-changing touchdowns against Indiana.

== Professional career ==
Pre-draft measurables
Height	Weight	Arm length	Hand span	40-yard dash	10-yard split	20-yard split	20-yard shuttle	Three-cone drill	Vertical jump	Broad jump	Bench press
5 ft 10 7/8 in (1.80 m)	223 lb (101 kg)	29 1/2 in (0.75 m)	9 in (0.23 m)	4.85 s	1.73 s	2.77 s	4.45 s	7.00 s	29 in (0.74 m)	9 ft 0 in (2.74 m)	22 reps
All values from NFL Combine/Pro Day

=== Miami Dolphins ===
Smith signed with the Miami Dolphins as an undrafted free agent on May 5, 2017. He was waived on September 2, 2017, and was signed to the Dolphins' practice squad the next day. He was promoted to the active roster on November 18, 2017. He was waived by the Dolphins two days later and re-signed to the practice squad. He was promoted back to the active roster on November 29, 2017.

=== Washington Redskins ===
Smith signed with the Washington Redskins on August 20, 2018. On September 1, 2018, he was waived for final roster cuts before the start of the 2018 season.

=== Orlando Apollos ===
On August 17, 2018, Smith signed with the Orlando Apollos of the Alliance of American Football for the 2019 AAF season. The league ceased operations in April 2019.

=== Tampa Bay Vipers ===
Smith was drafted in the 3rd round in the 2020 XFL draft by the Tampa Bay Vipers. He had his contract terminated when the league suspended operations on April 10, 2020.

=== The Spring League ===
Smith signed with the Aviators of The Spring League on October 17, 2020.

=== BC Lions ===
Smith signed with the BC Lions of the CFL on December 15, 2020. He was released on March 19, 2021.

=== Pittsburgh Maulers ===
Smith was drafted in the 2022 USFL draft by the Pittsburgh Maulers, but was cut from the team before the season by Kirby Wilson for requesting pizza that a staffer had brought into the cafeteria at meal time, instead of the chicken salad cafeteria food as Smith said he didn’t like chicken salad. The decision by Wilson was harshly criticized by many across social media.

=== Arlington Renegades ===
The Arlington Renegades selected Smith in the eighth round of the 2023 XFL Supplemental Draft on January 1, 2023. He re-signed with the team on January 29, 2024.

== NFL career statistics ==
Legend
	Led the league
	League champion
**Bold**	Career high

=== Regular season ===
Year	Team	Games		Rushing					Receiving					Fumbles	
Year	Team	GP	GS	Att	Yds	Avg	Lng	TD	Rec	Yds	Avg	Lng	TD	Fum	Lost
2017	MIA	5	0	0	0	0.0	0	0	3	27	9.0	13	0	0	0
Career		5	0	0	0	0.0	0	0	3	27	9.0	13	0	0	0

== AAF/XFL/UFL career statistics ==
=== Regular season ===
Year	Team	League	Games		Rushing					Receiving				
Year	Team	League	GP	GS	Att	Yds	Avg	Lng	TD	Rec	Yds	Avg	Lng	TD
2019	ORL	AAF	8	0	75	345	**4.6**	40	6	5	29	5.8	11	0
2020	TB	XFL	5	5	90	365	4.0	22	0	7	62	**8.8**	**25**	0
2023	ARL	XFL	9	8	**115**	365	3.1	18	**7**	18	148	8.2	21	0
2024	ARL	UFL	**10**	**10**	110	**451**	4.1	**46**	3	**23**	**180**	7.8	18	0
2025	ARL	UFL	7	0	10	7	0.7	4	4	0	0	0.0	0	0
Career			39	23	400	1,533	3.8	46	20	53	419	7.9	25	0

=== Postseason ===
Year	Team	League	Games		Rushing					Receiving				
Year	Team	League	GP	GS	Att	Yds	Avg	Lng	TD	Rec	Yds	Avg	Lng	TD
2023	ARL	XFL	2	1	39	148	3.7	24	0	1	-2	-2.0	-2	0
Career			2	1	39	148	3.7	24	0	1	-2	-2.0	-2	0
