= Lavelle Westbrooks =

American football player (born 1992)

Profile
- Position: Cornerback

Personal information
- Born: January 12, 1992 (age 34)
- Listed height: 6 ft 0 in (1.83 m)
- Listed weight: 185 lb (84 kg)

Career information
- High school: Riverdale (Riverdale, Georgia)
- College: Georgia Southern (2010–2013)
- NFL draft: 2014: 7th round, 252nd overall pick

Career history
- Cincinnati Bengals (2014)*; Buffalo Bills (2015)*; San Jose SaberCats (2016)*; Montreal Alouettes (2015)*
- * Offseason or practice squad member only

Awards and highlights
- Second-team All-SoCon (2013)
- Stats at Pro Football Reference

Lavelle Westbrooks (born January 12, 1992) is an American former professional football cornerback. He was selected by the Cincinnati Bengals in the seventh round of the 2014 NFL draft. He played college football at Georgia Southern.

== Early life ==
Westbrooks played high school football at Riverdale High School in Riverdale, Georgia, garnering first-team All-Region recognition his junior year and second-team All-Region honors as a senior. He also participated in track and field in high school.

== College career ==
Westbrooks played college football for the Georgia Southern Eagles from 2010 to 2013.

He played in 13 games, starting seven at cornerback, his freshman season in 2010. He appeared in 13 games, starting 12, as a sophomore in 2011, recording 60 tackles, one interception, three pass breakups and one fumble recovery. Westbrooks once again played in 13 games, starting 12, his junior year in 2012, totaling 43 tackles, seven pass breakups and two interceptions, one of which was returned for a touchdown. He started all 10 games he played in his senior year in 2013, accumulating 32 tackles, seven breakups and two interceptions. He earned second-team All-Southern Conference honors in 2013. He also missed the final game of the season due to injury.

Westbrooks was invited to the 2014 Senior Bowl.

== Professional career ==
Westbrooks was selected by the Cincinnati Bengals in the seventh round of the 2014 NFL draft with the 252nd overall pick. He officially signed with the Bengals on May 22, 2014. He was waived/injured on August 26, 2014 and reverted to injured reserve the next day. Westbrooks was waived by the Bengals on August 30, 2014.

Westbrooks signed with the Buffalo Bills on August 12, 2015. He was waived on August 17, 2015.

On October 6, 2015, he was assigned to the San Jose SaberCats of the Arena Football League. He was placed on other league exempt on October 21, 2015.

Westbrooks was signed to the practice roster of the Montreal Alouettes of the Canadian Football League on October 10, 2015.
