= Weston Richburg =

American football player (born 1991)

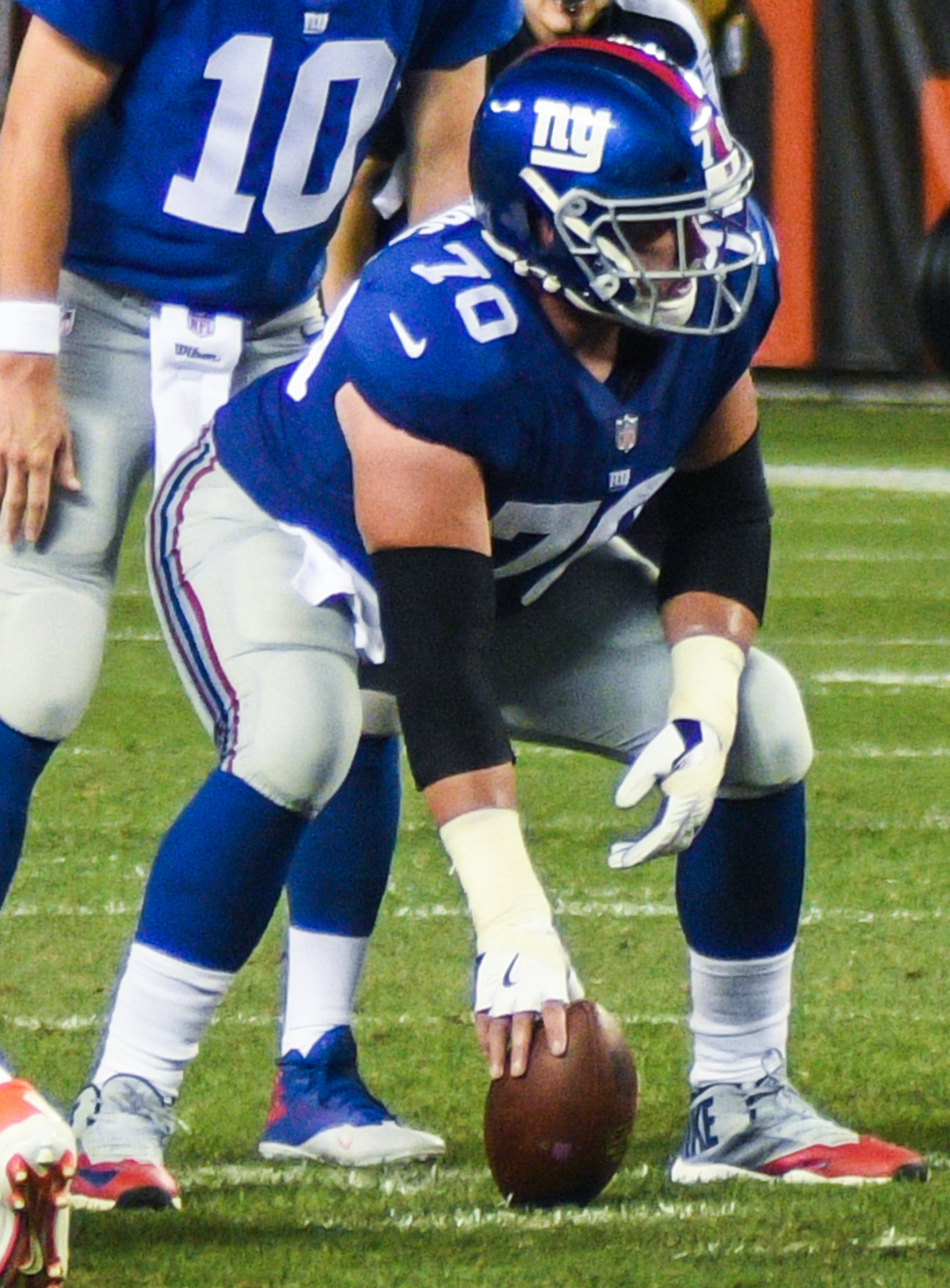
- Richburg with the New York Giants in 2017

No. 70, 58
- Position: Center

Personal information
- Born: July 9, 1991 (age 35); Louisville, Kentucky, U.S.
- Listed height: 6 ft 4 in (1.93 m)
- Listed weight: 295 lb (134 kg)

Career information
- High school: Bushland (Bushland, Texas)
- College: Colorado State (2009–2013)
- NFL draft: 2014: 2nd round, 43rd overall pick

Career history
- New York Giants (2014–2017); San Francisco 49ers (2018–2020)

Awards and highlights
- First-team All-MWC (2013); Second-team All-MWC (2011)

Career NFL statistics
- Games played: 79
- Games started: 78
- Total tackles: 1
- Stats at Pro Football Reference

Weston Blaine Richburg (born July 9, 1991) is an American former professional football player who was a center in the National Football League (NFL). He played college football for the Colorado State Rams and was selected by the New York Giants in the second round of the 2014 NFL draft. Richburg also played for the San Francisco 49ers.

== Early life ==
A native of Bushland, Texas, Richburg attended Bushland High School, where he was a two-sport star in football and track. In football, he was a two-way lineman and team captain. As a senior, he recorded two sacks as a defensive lineman, but earned first-team all-district honors on the offensive line. The Bushland Falcons went undefeated (10–0) through the regular season, but lost in the first round of the UIL 2A Division I playoffs to eventual state champion Muleshoe.

Richburg also competed in track & field at Bushland as a thrower. He captured the state title in the shot put event at the 2009 UIL T&F Championships, with a PR throw of 18.34 meters (60 ft 1 in), setting a school record, that ranks as the fourth-best throw by a Texas prep athlete in any classification and worthy of the Texas Class 2A gold medal. In the discus, he got a top-throw of 53.31 meters (172 ft 2 in) at the 2009 Texas Tech Regional Qualifiers, where he took bronze. He also competed as a hurdler earlier in high school.

Regarded as a two-star recruit by Rivals.com, Richburg was not ranked among the best offensive lineman of the class of 2009, which also included D. J. Fluker and Taylor Lewan. He chose Colorado State over Texas Christian, the only other scholarship offer he received.

== College career ==
At the beginning of his senior season at Colorado State, Richburg was graded at greater than 90 percent in all five graded games.

== Professional career ==
=== Pre-draft ===
Richburg was considered one of the best center prospects for the 2014 NFL draft.

Pre-draft measurables
| Height | Weight | Arm length | Hand span | 40-yard dash | 10-yard split | 20-yard split | 20-yard shuttle | Three-cone drill | Vertical jump | Broad jump | Bench press |
|---|---|---|---|---|---|---|---|---|---|---|---|
| 6 ft 3 3/8 in (1.91 m) | 298 lb (135 kg) | 33 3/8 in (0.85 m) | 9 1/4 in (0.23 m) | 5.10 s | 1.84 s | 2.97 s | 4.63 s | 7.93 s | 25.5 in (0.65 m) | 8 ft 10 in (2.69 m) | 25 reps |
All values from NFL Combine

=== New York Giants ===
Richburg was selected by the New York Giants in the second round of the 2014 NFL draft with the 43rd overall pick. Due to numerous injuries to offensive lineman in his rookie season, most notably to guards Chris Snee and Geoff Schwartz, Richburg, despite initially intended as the backup center in his rookie season, was forced to play out of position at guard. Because of his limited experience and relatively small size for the position, Richburg struggled.

In 2015, Richburg was returned to his natural position of center, and with a year of NFL experience under his belt, he soon showed himself to be among the league's best centers; Pro Football Focus ranked him as the NFL's #2 center for the 2015 season.

In Week 3 against the Washington Redskins on September 25, 2016, Richburg was ejected for committing two unsportsmanlike conduct penalties; the second came for pushing Josh Norman. He became the first player to be ejected under this new rule since NFL applied it during the beginning of 2016 (in response to Norman's previous clash with the Giants, and in particular Giants receiver Odell Beckham Jr, while Norman was with the Carolina Panthers).

On November 4, 2017, Richburg was placed on injured reserve with a concussion.

=== San Francisco 49ers ===
On March 14, 2018, Richburg signed a five-year, $47.5 million contract with the San Francisco 49ers.

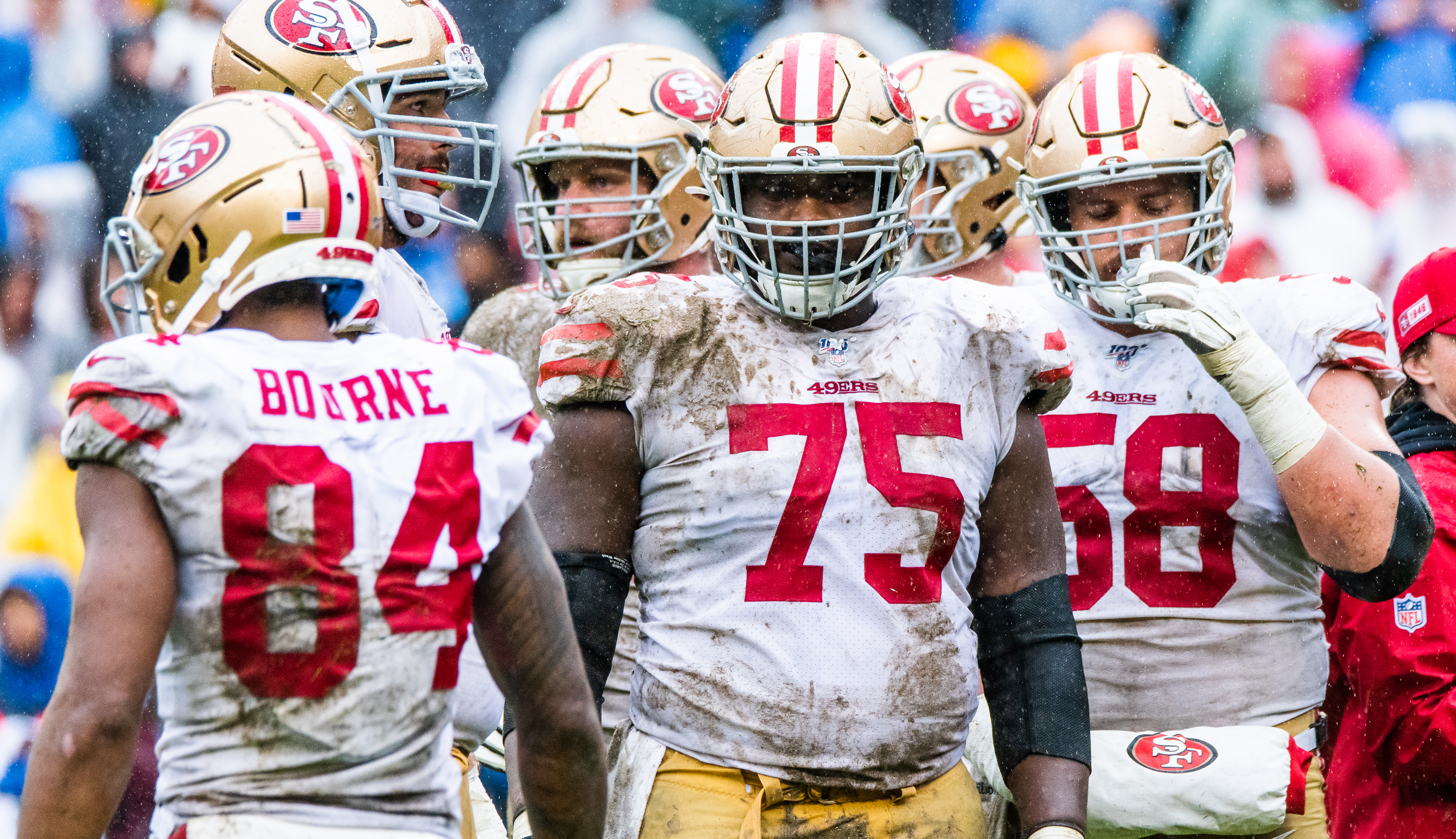
Richburg (#58) in 2019

In Week 14 of the 2019 season, Richburg suffered a torn patellar tendon and was ruled out for the rest of the season. He was placed on injured reserve on December 11, 2019. Without Richburg, the 49ers reached Super Bowl LIV, but lost 31–20 to the Kansas City Chiefs. He was placed on the active/physically unable to perform list (PUP) at the start of training camp on July 28, 2020, and placed on the reserve/PUP list at the start of the regular season on September 5.

In March 2021, Richburg underwent hip surgery. On June 2, 2021, he retired from professional football.
