= Crockett Gillmore =

American football player (born 1991)

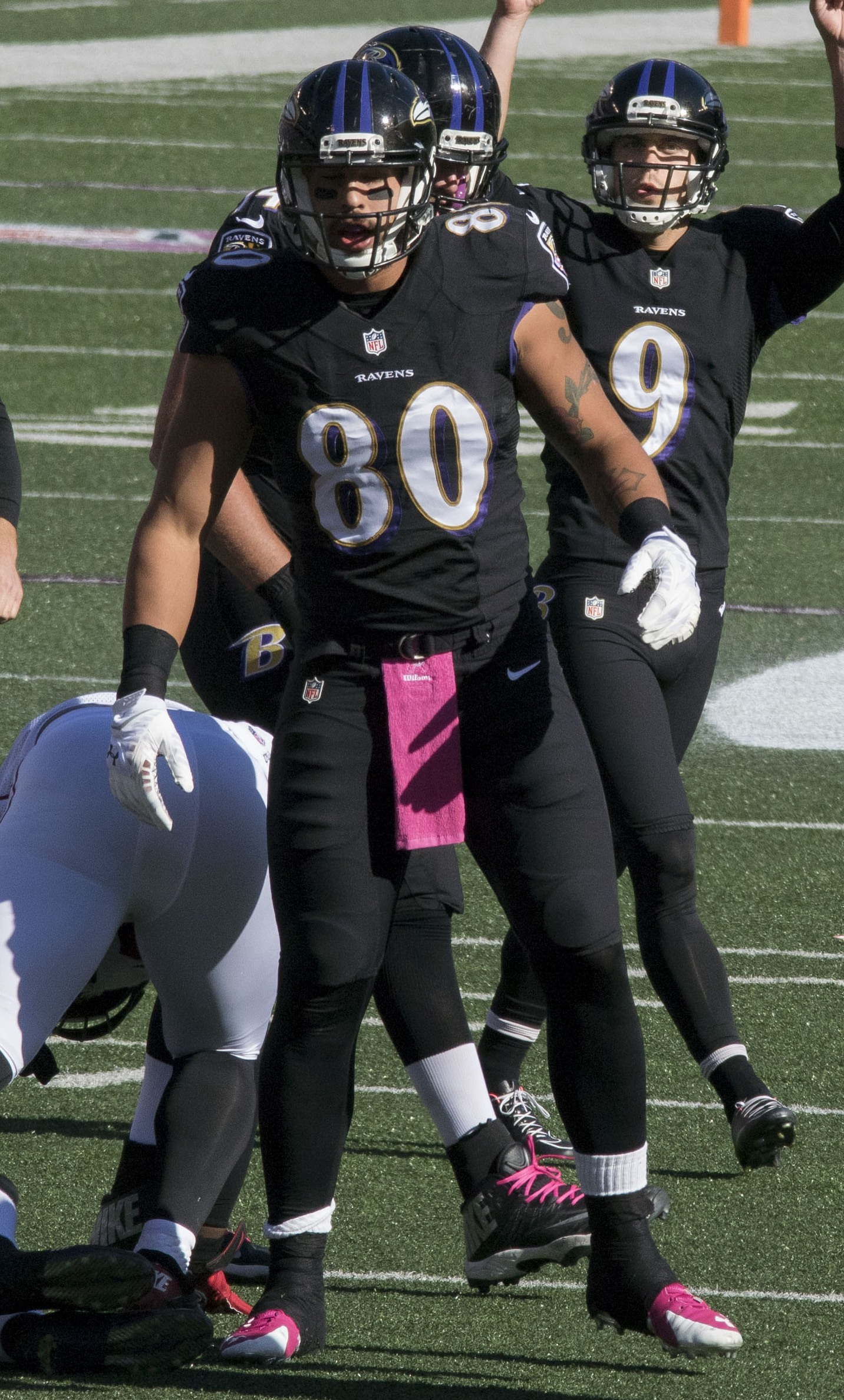
- Gillmore with the Baltimore Ravens in 2014

Colorado Mesa Mavericks
- Title: Special teams coordinator & defensive line coach

Personal information
- Born: November 16, 1991 (age 34); Amarillo, Texas, U.S.
- Listed height: 6 ft 6 in (1.98 m)
- Listed weight: 266 lb (121 kg)

Career information
- High school: Bushland High School (Bushland, Texas)
- College: Colorado State
- NFL draft: 2014: 3rd round, 99th overall pick

Career history

Playing
- Baltimore Ravens (2014–2017)

Coaching
- Colorado Mesa (2022–present) Special teams coordinator & defensive line coach

Awards and highlights
- First-team All-MWC (2013); Second-team All-MWC (2011)

Career NFL statistics
- Receptions: 51
- Receiving yards: 604
- Receiving touchdowns: 6
- Stats at Pro Football Reference

Crockett Allen Gillmore (born November 16, 1991) is an American football coach and former tight end. He is the special teams coordinator and defensive line coach for Colorado Mesa University, a position he has held since 2022. He was selected by the Baltimore Ravens in the third round of the 2014 NFL draft. He played college football at Colorado State.

== Early life ==
Gillmore attended Bushland High School in Bushland, Texas, where he was teammates with Weston Richburg.Gillmore was selected to the first-team all-district for both positions at wide receiver and defensive end. He was named as the Amarillo Globe-News Offensive Player of the Year in high school. He was a 2009 all-state honorable-mention and was selected to the first-team all-district. He was selected as the Golden Spread 2A-3A Player of the Year during high school.

== College career ==
In his senior season, he was voted to the first-team All-Mountain West Conference by coaches on December 11, 2013. In January 2014, he participated in both the 2014 East-West Shrine Game and 2014 Senior Bowl.

== Professional career ==
Pre-draft measurables
| Height | Weight | Arm length | Hand span | Wingspan | 40-yard dash | 10-yard split | 20-yard split | 20-yard shuttle | Three-cone drill | Vertical jump | Broad jump | Bench press |
|---|---|---|---|---|---|---|---|---|---|---|---|---|
| 6 ft 5 7/8 in (1.98 m) | 260 lb (118 kg) | 33 3/4 in (0.86 m) | 10 3/8 in (0.26 m) | 6 ft 8 1/2 in (2.04 m) | 4.89 s | 1.69 s | 2.81 s | 4.44 s | 7.42 s | 33.5 in (0.85 m) | 10 ft 0 in (3.05 m) | 18 reps |
All values from NFL Combine/Pro Day

=== 2014 season ===
On May 9, 2014, in the 2014 NFL draft, Gillmore was selected by the Baltimore Ravens in the third round, 99th overall.

With starting tight end Dennis Pitta suffering a hip injury, Gillmore was expected to play a larger role than first expected. In 15 games Gillmore had 10 receptions for 121 yards for one touchdown on 15 targets.

In the Wildcard Round of the playoffs that year, Gillmore recorded only one reception, but he took it 21 yards for a game-sealing touchdown, helping the Ravens defeat their division rival Pittsburgh Steelers in the playoffs for the first time.

=== 2015 season ===
In the Ravens' third preseason game against the Washington Redskins, Gillmore broke through several defenders to score a long touchdown. The play was called back by penalty, but the media praised Gillmore for putting his determination to make the team on display. At the end of Baltimore's Week 1 game against the Denver Broncos, Gillmore was on the receiving end of a Joe Flacco pass that could've been the game-winning touchdown, but had the ball taken from him by former teammate Darian Stewart, ending his team's chance at a comeback. Gillmore would rebound the following week against the Oakland Raiders with a five-catch, 88-yard performance in which he caught two touchdowns, one of which he scored after bulldozing through three defenders. However, the Ravens still lost 37–33.

Gillmore caught his third touchdown of the season in a Week 8 win against the San Diego Chargers. He scored for the fourth time two weeks later in a loss to the Jacksonville Jaguars. In Week 11, Gillmore had 100+ yards receiving and led the Ravens in receiving, both first time career accomplishments, catching a career-high 101 yards off of five catches in a 16–13 win over the St. Louis Rams. On December 21, 2015, Gillmore was placed on injured reserve with a back injury, ending his season. Gillmore's 2015 campaign saw him record 33 receptions for 412 yards and four touchdowns.

=== 2016 season ===
Gillmore suffered a thigh injury in Week 7 against the Jets, and was inactive for the rest of the season. He ended the season playing in seven games with five starts, recording eight catches for 71 yards and one touchdown.

=== 2017 season ===
During training camp, Gillmore suffered an MCL injury which required surgery, causing him to miss the 2017 season.

Gillmore added 40 pounds and attempted to make the switch to offensive line in the 2018 offseason, but was not signed by a team.

== NFL career statistics ==
| Year | Team | Games | | Receiving | | | | | Fumbles | |
| Year | Team | GP | GS | Rec | Yds | Avg | Lng | TD | Fum | Lost |
|---|---|---|---|---|---|---|---|---|---|---|
| 2014 | BAL | 15 | 1 | 10 | 121 | 12.1 | 22 | 1 | 0 | 0 |
| 2015 | BAL | 10 | 10 | 33 | 412 | 12.5 | 46 | 4 | 0 | 0 |
| 2016 | BAL | 7 | 5 | 8 | 71 | 8.9 | 22 | 1 | 0 | 0 |
| Total | | 32 | 16 | 51 | 604 | 11.8 | 46 | 6 | 0 | 0 |
