= Vegas Vipers =

American football team

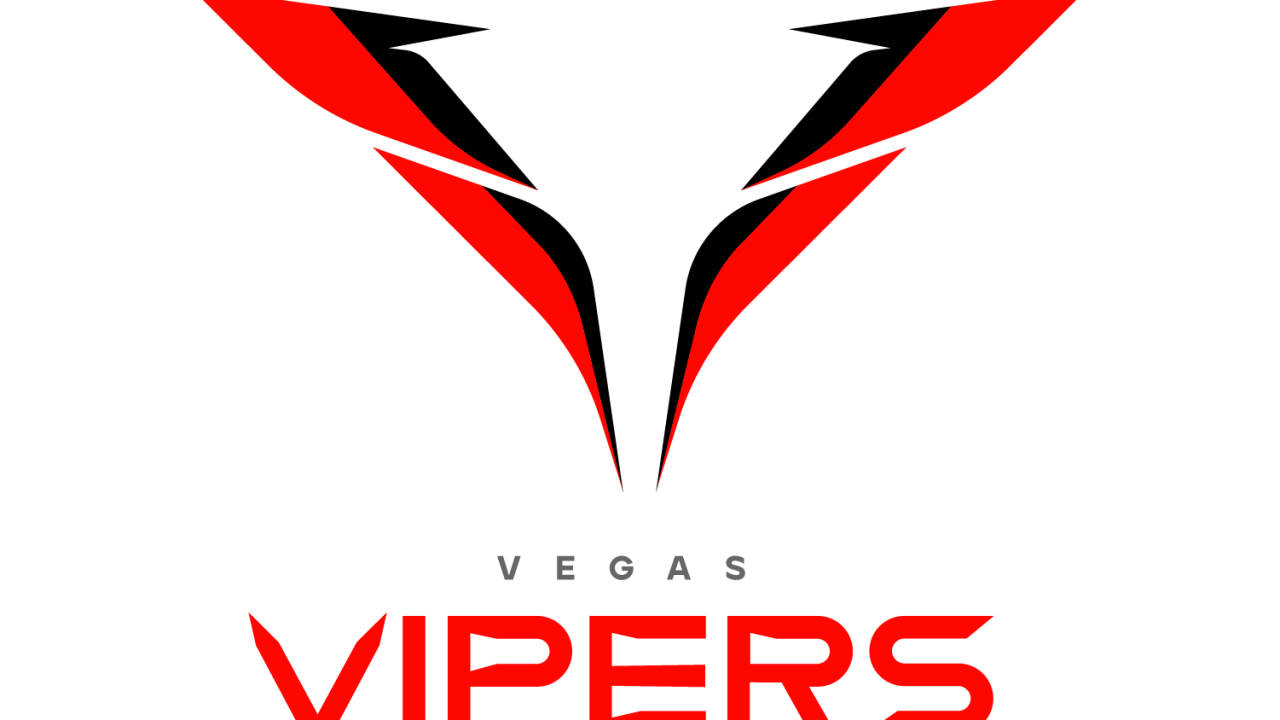
Logo

General information
- Founded: 2018 (as the Tampa Bay Vipers)
- Folded: 2024
- Colors: Black, red
- Website: xfl.com/teams/las-vegas

Personnel
- Owners: Alpha Acquico, LLC: (RedBird Capital Partners; Dwayne Johnson; Dany Garcia)
- Head coach: Marc Trestman (2020) Rod Woodson (2023) Anthony Blevins (planned 2024)

Team history
- Tampa Bay Vipers (2020–2022); Vegas Vipers (2023)

Home fields
- Raymond James Stadium (2020); Cashman Field (2023)

League / conference affiliations
- XFL (2020–2023): East Division (2020); North Division (2023)

The Vegas Vipers were a professional American football team based in Las Vegas, Nevada. The Vipers competed in the XFL football league. The team was founded by Vince McMahon's Alpha Entertainment as the Tampa Bay Vipers and were owned-and-operated by Dwayne Johnson’s Alpha Acquico. The Vipers had a franchise regular season record of 3–12 (.200), the worst win percentage among all XFL teams.

== History ==
=== Tampa Bay (2020, McMahon Era) ===
Tampa Bay joined Seattle, Houston, Los Angeles, New York, Dallas, St. Louis and Washington, D.C. as the league's inaugural cities. On March 5, 2019, Marc Trestman was announced to be the head coach and general manager of the Tampa Bay XFL team for the 2020 season. The team name and logo were revealed on August 21, 2019, as well as the teams uniforms on December 3, 2019.

On October 15, 2019, The Vipers announced their first player in team history, being assigned former Georgia Bulldogs Quarterback Aaron Murray.

Vipers Wordmark logo during the 2020 season

On February 9, 2020, the Vipers played their first game in team history, losing to the New York Guardians 23–3. They won their first game in week 4, shutting out the DC Defenders 25–0. The Vipers played the Los Angeles Wildcats in what would be the final game of the 2020 iteration of the XFL.

On March 12, 2020, The XFL announced that the remainder of the 2020 XFL season had been cancelled due to the COVID-19 pandemic. The team finished with a 1–4 record. On April 10, 2020, The XFL Suspended operations, with all employees, players and staff being terminated.

=== Vegas (2023, Dwayne Johnson and Dany Garcia Era) ===
On July 24, 2022, the XFL announced that it would be placing one of its eight teams in the Las Vegas area, and that Rod Woodson would be its head coach. It initially appeared unclear whether this would be a new expansion team or a relocation. As early as April 2020, the league had reportedly been considering moving the Vipers to Orlando, 80 miles up Interstate 4 from Tampa, and the July 24 announcement confirmed that Orlando would get a team and that Tampa Bay would no longer have one. However, when team names were leaked in September and confirmed in October, it was instead revealed that Orlando's team would take on the name of the Guardians, a team that had played in North Jersey representing New York City in 2020, and that the Vipers name would instead be relocated to Las Vegas in homage to southern Nevada being home to numerous rattlesnakes. The move returned the XFL to a market that previously had a team in the 2001 iteration of the league in the Las Vegas Outlaws.

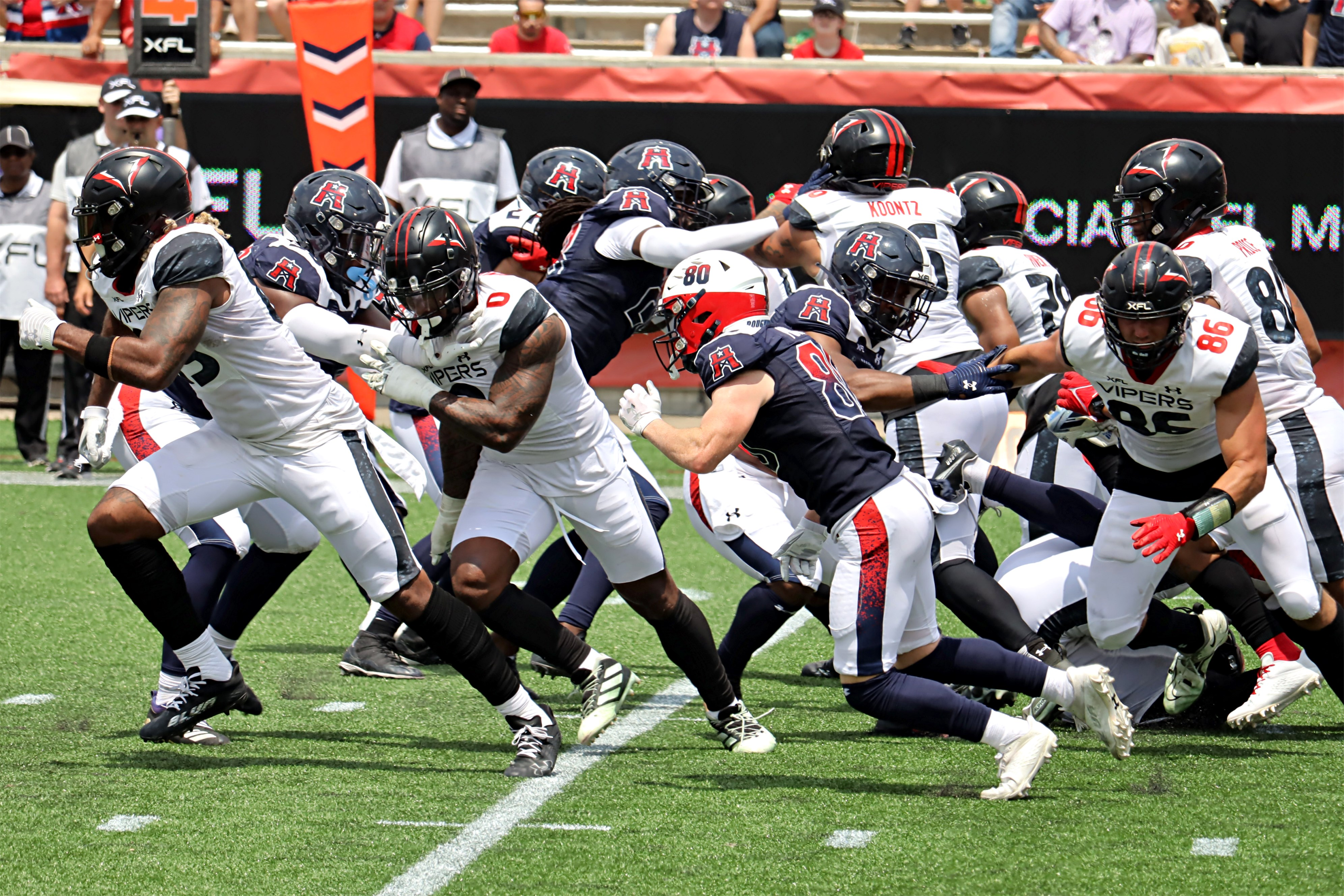
A game between the Vipers and Houston Roughnecks during the 2023 season

At the time of the original announcement, Las Vegas was the only city in which the XFL had not secured a stadium agreement. By the league's own admission, the process of securing a stadium was "long and tedious," as the Vipers had to negotiate around the other teams using Las Vegas's venues (with Allegiant Stadium, Cashman Field, and Bishop Gorman High School being considered at various points), and the XFL was dead-set against having the Vipers play as a traveling team until a venue could be secured. On January 5, 2023, the day the league's schedule was released, Cashman Field was announced to be the Vipers home stadium for the 2023 season. The move into Cashman Field was done with the full cooperation of the Las Vegas Lights FC, who cooperated with the Vipers in setting out each team's schedule. The league had difficulties getting the playing surface to professional standards and maintaining it; the dried, brown grass had to be painted green (causing the field to become slippery when heavy rains fell during the home opener), divots caused by heavy equipment were noted on the field, ESPN's press box was open-air and covered by a tarp, and the boundary lines painted on the field were found to not be straight. Both the Vipers players and league president Russ Brandon noted that the field was structurally sound and held up well to the harsh conditions.

On June 11, 2023, the Vipers parted ways with their head coach Rod Woodson after just one season. Woodson finished the 2023 season with a 2–8 record and finished last in the division. They later hired New York Giants Assistant Special Teams Coordinator Anthony Blevins to replace him on July 7, 2023.

On August 31, 2023, the Vipers announced that they would not return to Cashman Field in 2024. The statement did not specify whether the team would be seeking a deal with one of the other stadiums in Las Vegas (as the Houston Roughnecks did in response to their home stadium being slated for renovation) or seeking relocation to another market; if the latter option was chosen, Nashville, Tennessee, Portland, Oregon, and Phoenix, Arizona, were identified as potential candidates to host the team.

In September 2023, Axios reported that the XFL was in advanced talks with the USFL to merge the two leagues prior to the start of their 2024 seasons. On September 28, 2023, the XFL and USFL announced their intent to merge with details surrounding the merger to be announced at a later date. The merger would also require regulatory approval. In October 2023 the XFL filed a trademark application for the name "United Football League". On November 30, 2023, Garcia announced via her Instagram page that the leagues had received regulatory approval for the merger and were finalizing plans for a "combined season" to begin March 30, 2024. The merger was made official on December 31, 2023, and on January 1, 2024, it was announced the Vipers would not be a part of the merger.

== Player History ==
=== Current NFL players ===
XFL Season	Pos	Name	NFL team
2020	LS	Nick Moore	Baltimore Ravens

=== Notable players ===
XFL Season	Pos	Name	Notes
2020	QB	Aaron Murray	Former Georgia Bulldogs Quarterback, 2014 5th Round Pick
2020	WR	Antonio Callaway	Former Cleveland Browns Wide Receiver, 2018 4th Round Pick
2023	RB	Matt Jones	Former Washington Redskins Running Back, 2015 3rd Round Pick
2023	WR	Martavis Bryant	Former Pittsburgh Steelers Wide Receiver, 2014 4th Round Pick
2023	DE	Vic Beasley	Former Atlanta Falcons Linebacker, 2015 1st Round Pick, 2016 Pro Bowler
2023	WR	Geronimo Allison	Former Green Bay Packers Wide Receiver
2023	QB	Brett Hundley	Former Green Bay Packers Quarterback, 2015 5th Round Pick

=== XFL Defensive Player of the Year award winners ===
Vipers XFL DPOY winners
Year	Player	Position	Selector
2023	Pita Taumoepenu	LB	XFL

== Coach history ==
=== Head coach history ===
#	Name	Term	Regular season				Playoffs			Awards
#	Name	Term	GC	W	L	Win %	GC	W	L	Awards
Tampa Bay Vipers
1	Marc Trestman	2020	5	1	4	.200	-	-	-	
Vegas Vipers
2	Rod Woodson	2023	10	2	8	.200	-	-	-	

=== Offensive coordinator history ===
#	Name	Term	Regular season				Playoffs			Awards
#	Name	Term	GC	W	L	Win %	GC	W	L	Awards
Tampa Bay Vipers
1	Jaime Elizondo	2020	5	1	4	.200	-	-	-	
Vegas Vipers
2	Duane Taylor	2023	3	0	3	.000	-	-	-	
3	Ray Sherman	2023	7	2	5	.286	-	-	-	

=== Defensive coordinator history ===
#	Name	Term	Regular season				Playoffs			Awards
#	Name	Term	GC	W	L	Win %	GC	W	L	Awards
Tampa Bay Vipers
1	Jerry Glanville	2020	5	1	4	.200	-	-	-	
Vegas Vipers
2	Cris Dishman	2023	10	2	8	.200	-	-	-	

== Rivalries ==
The Vipers' main rival was the St. Louis Battlehawks. The fans of the Battlehawks constantly joked that Viper fans defecate while standing. This rivalry ended in 2024 when the Vegas Vipers franchise was disbanded. The Vipers finished the rivalry with a 0–2 record against the Battlehawks.

=== Overall regular season record vs. opponents ===
Team	Record	Win %
San Antonio Brahmas	1-0	1.000
Orlando Guardians	1-1	.500
DC Defenders	1-2	.333
Arlington Renegades	0-1	.000
Los Angeles Wildcats	0-1	.000
Houston Roughnecks	0-2	.000
St. Louis Battlehawks	0-2	.000
Seattle Sea Dragons	0-3	.000

=== Season-by-season record ===
XFL champions^{§}	Division champions^{^}	Wild Card berth^{#}

Season	Team	League	Conference	Division	Regular season			Postseason results	Awards	Head coaches	Pct.
Season	Team	League	Conference	Division	Finish	W	L	Postseason results	Awards	Head coaches	Pct.
2020	2020	XFL		East	4th	1	4	Season Suspended after 5 games due to COVID-19		Marc Trestman	.200
2021	No Season										
2022	No Season										
2023	2023	XFL		North	4th	2	8		Pita Taumoepenu (DPOY)	Rod Woodson	.200
Total						3	12	All-time regular season record (2020–2023)			.200
Total						0	0	All-time postseason record (2020–2023)			–
Total						3	12	All-time regular season and postseason record (2020–2023)			.200

== Records ==
All-time Vipers leaders
Leader	Player	Record	Years with Vipers
Passing yards	Luis Perez	900 passing yards	2023
Passing Touchdowns	Luis Perez	8 passing touchdowns	2023
Rushing yards	De'Veon Smith	365 rushing yards	2020
Rushing Touchdowns	Taylor Cornelius John Lovett	3 rushing touchdowns	2020 2023
Receiving yards	Jeff Badet	449 receiving yards	2023
Receiving Touchdowns	Jeff Badet	34 receptions	2023
Receptions	Jeff Badet	5 receiving touchdowns	2023
Tackles	C.J. Avery	62 tackles	2023
Sacks	Pita Taumoepenu	7.5 sacks	2023
Interceptions	Tarvarus McFadden Marwin Evans Keylon Kennedy	2 interceptions	2020 2023 2023
Coaching wins	Rod Woodson	2 wins	2023
