= Bushland, Texas =

Census-designated place in Potter County, Texas, United States

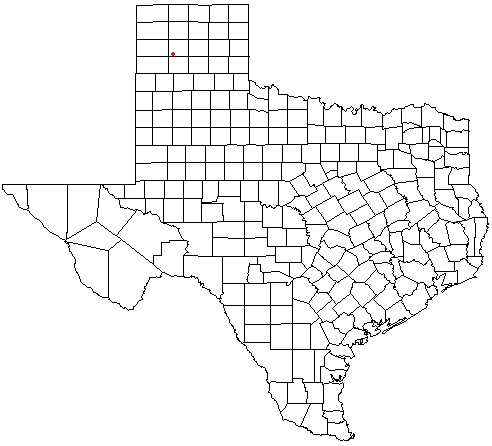
Location of Bushland in the state of Texas

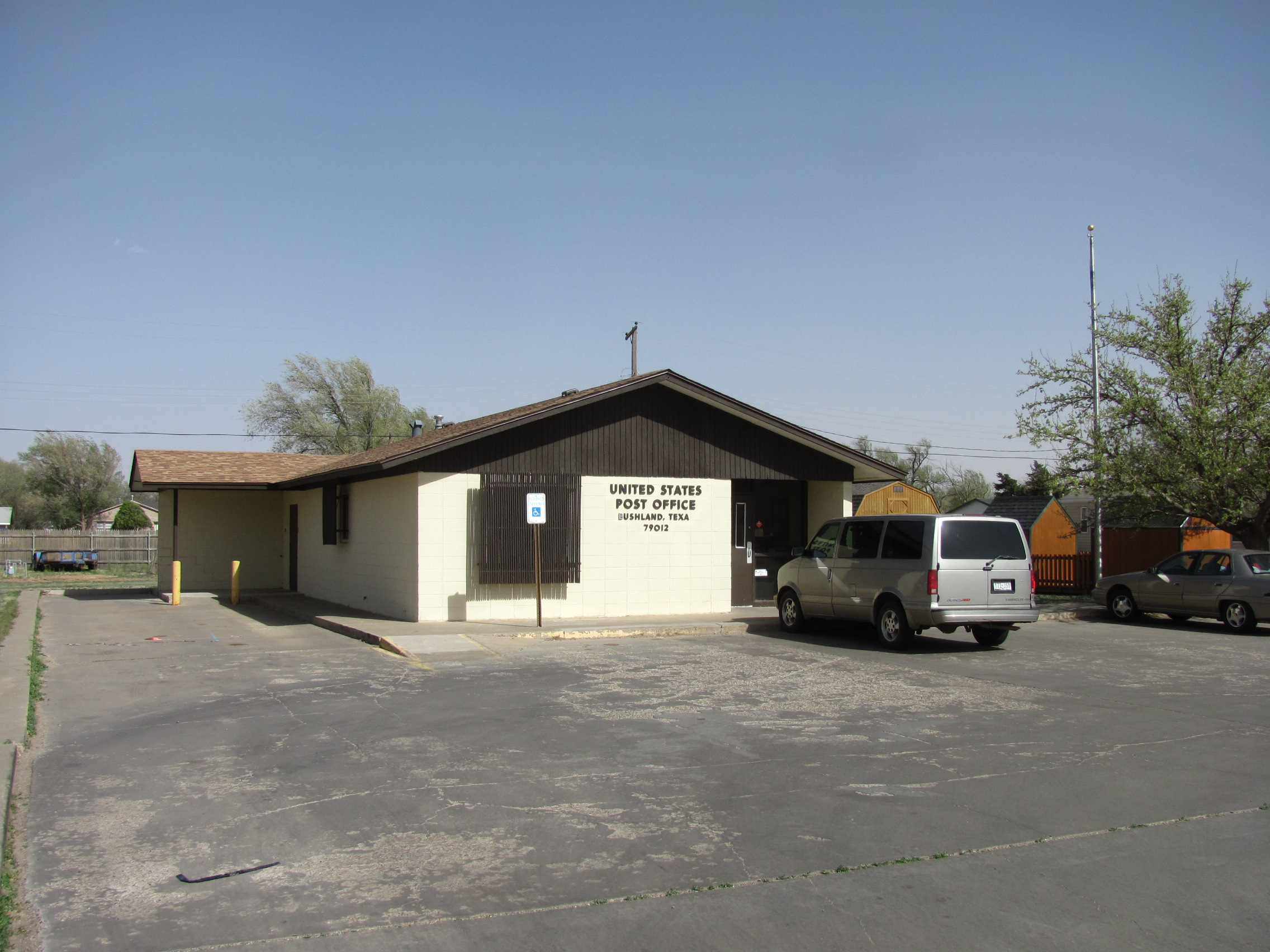
Bushland Post Office

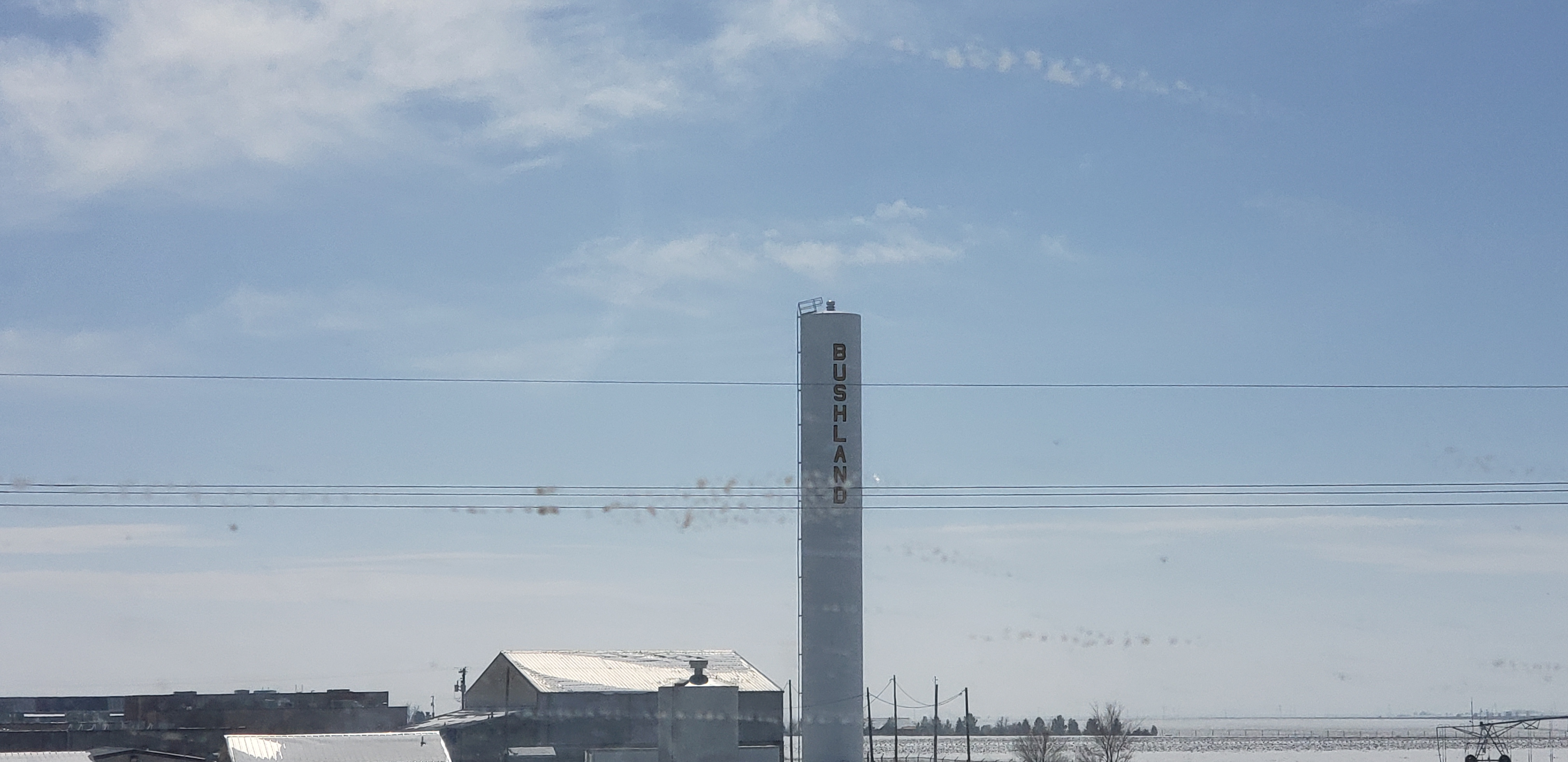
Bushland

Bushland is a census-designated place (CDP) in southwestern Potter and Randall counties in Texas, United States. A small portion of the CDP extends south into Randall County. As of the 2020 census, Bushland had a population of 2,234. The community is part of the Amarillo, Texas Metropolitan Statistical Area.

== Geography ==
Bushland is located at 35°11′31″N 102°03′53″W (35.1919978, -102.0646392), at an elevation of 3,825 feet. The community is situated along Interstate 40, approximately 14 miles west of Amarillo in southwestern Potter County.

Bushland is the halfway point between Chicago and Los Angeles, 1,062 miles from either city. The two cities were the original endpoints of U.S. Route 66.

== History ==
Established as a station on the Chicago, Rock Island and Gulf Railway, Bushland was named for William Henry Bush, a Chicago native. In 1898, land owner Joseph Glidden (the inventor of barbed wire) transferred the Frying Pan Ranch to Mr. Bush, who was his son-in-law. The total cost was $68,000. Thereafter, Bush donated land for a town site and a railroad right-of-way. On July 3, 1908, the town was formally dedicated by Bush and his associate S.H. Smiser. Farmers soon settled in and around Bushland. A public school district was established, followed by the opening of a post office in January 1909. The community's population remained small, hovering near 20 during the 1910s and 1920s. By 1940, that figure had risen to 175, with four businesses operating in the community. Throughout the latter half of the twentieth century and into the twenty-first, Bushland's population has remained steady at around 130.

In 2009, Bushland made National News after a gas pipeline ruptured near Prairie West, a local neighborhood. At 1:00 AM on Wednesday, November 4, 2009, a gas line operated by El Paso Natural Gas Company malfunctioned, shooting flames 700 feet into the air. Three residents of the neighborhood were injured, and transported to Lubbock for health treatment.

== Demographics ==
Historical population
Census	Pop.	Note	%±
2020	2,234		—
U.S. Decennial Census; 1850–1900 1910; 1920 1930 1940; 1950 1960 1970; 1980 1990 2000; 2010 2020

Bushland first appeared as a census designated place in the 2020 U.S. census.

=== 2020 Census ===
Bushland CDP, Texas – Racial and ethnic composition Note: the US Census treats Hispanic/Latino as an ethnic category. This table excludes Latinos from the racial categories and assigns them to a separate category. Hispanics/Latinos may be of any race.
Race / Ethnicity (NH = Non-Hispanic)	Pop 2020	% 2020
White alone (NH)	1,815	81.24%
Black or African American alone (NH)	19	0.85%
Native American or Alaska Native alone (NH)	10	0.45%
Asian alone (NH)	11	0.49%
Native Hawaiian or Pacific Islander alone (NH)	0	0.00%
Other race alone (NH)	2	0.09%
Mixed race or Multiracial (NH)	105	4.70%
Hispanic or Latino (any race)	272	12.18%
Total	2,234	100.00%

As of the 2020 United States census, there were 2,234 people, 709 households, and 672 families residing in the CDP.

== Education ==
Public education in the community of Bushland is provided by the Bushland Independent School District. The district operates three campuses – Bushland Elementary School (grades PK–4), Bushland Middle School (grades 5–8), and Bushland High School (grades 9–12). In 2011, Bushland residents voted in favor of a bond issue to build additions to the High School, build a cafeteria for the Middle School and purchase new buses for the district.

== Climate ==
According to the Köppen Climate Classification system, Bushland has a semi-arid climate, abbreviated "BSk" on climate maps.

== See also ==
- List of census-designated places in Texas
