= Zampese =

Zampese is an Italian surname. Notable people with the surname include:

- Ernie Zampese (1936–2022), American football player and coach
- Ken Zampese (born 1967), American football coach
