= Keith Towbridge =

American football player (born 1995)

Bethune–Cookman Wildcats
- Title: Tight ends coach and special teams coordinator

Personal information
- Born: May 21, 1995 (age 31); Toledo, Ohio, U.S.
- Listed height: 6 ft 5 in (1.96 m)
- Listed weight: 262 lb (119 kg)

Career information
- High school: Central Catholic (Toledo, Ohio)
- College: Louisville (2013–2016)
- NFL draft: 2017: undrafted

Career history

Playing
- Buffalo Bills (2017–2018); Atlanta Legends (2019); Tennessee Titans (2019)*; Buffalo Bills (2019)*; Washington Redskins (2019)*
- * Offseason or practice squad member only

Coaching
- Christian Academy of Louisville (2021–2023) Co-offensive coordinator & tight ends coach; Purdue (2024) Offensive analyst; Bethune–Cookman (2025–present) Tight ends coach & special teams coordinator
- Stats at Pro Football Reference

Keith Towbridge (born May 21, 1995) is an American former professional football player who was a tight end in the National Football League (NFL). He is currently the tight ends coach and special teams coordinator at Bethune–Cookman University, a position he has held since 2025. He played college football for Louisville Cardinals before playing in the NFL for the Buffalo Bills, Tennessee Titans, and Washington Redskins.

== College career ==
A 3-star recruit, Towbridge accepted an offer to play college football for the Louisville Cardinals, over offers from Bowling Green, Cincinnati, Illinois, Kentucky, Nebraska, Purdue, and Toledo. In his college career, spanning from 2012 through 2016, Towbridge recorded 21 receptions for 283 yards and 3 touchdowns.

== Professional career ==
Pre-draft measurables
| Height | Weight | 40-yard dash | 10-yard split | 20-yard split | 20-yard shuttle | Three-cone drill | Vertical jump | Broad jump | Bench press |
|---|---|---|---|---|---|---|---|---|---|
| 6 ft 5 in (1.96 m) | 262 lb (119 kg) | 4.72 s | 1.68 s | 2.70 s | 4.40 s | 7.10 s | 37 1/2 in (0.95 m) | 10 ft 5 in (3.18 m) | 19 reps |
All values from NFL combine

=== Buffalo Bills ===
Towbridge signed with the Buffalo Bills as an undrafted free agent on May 5, 2017. He was waived/injured on August 7, 2017, and was placed on injured reserve.

On September 1, 2018, Towbridge was waived by the Bills. He was re-signed to the practice squad on October 9, 2018.

=== Atlanta Legends (AAF) ===
In 2019, Towbridge joined the Atlanta Legends of the Alliance of American Football.

=== Tennessee Titans ===
After the AAF suspended football operations, Towbridge signed with the Tennessee Titans on April 8, 2019. On June 13, 2019, the Titans waived Towbridge.

=== Buffalo Bills (second stint) ===
On June 14, 2019, Towbridge was claimed off waivers by the Buffalo Bills. He was waived on August 31, 2019.

=== Washington Redskins ===
On November 12, 2019, Towbridge was signed to the Washington Redskins practice squad. His practice squad contract with the team expired on January 6, 2020.

Towbridge was selected by the New York Guardians in the 2020 XFL draft.
