= Lou Young =

Lou Young may refer to:

- Lou Young (cornerback) (born 1991), American football cornerback
- Lou Young (American football coach) (1894–1948), American football coach
