= Khalil Bass =

American gridiron football player (born 1990)

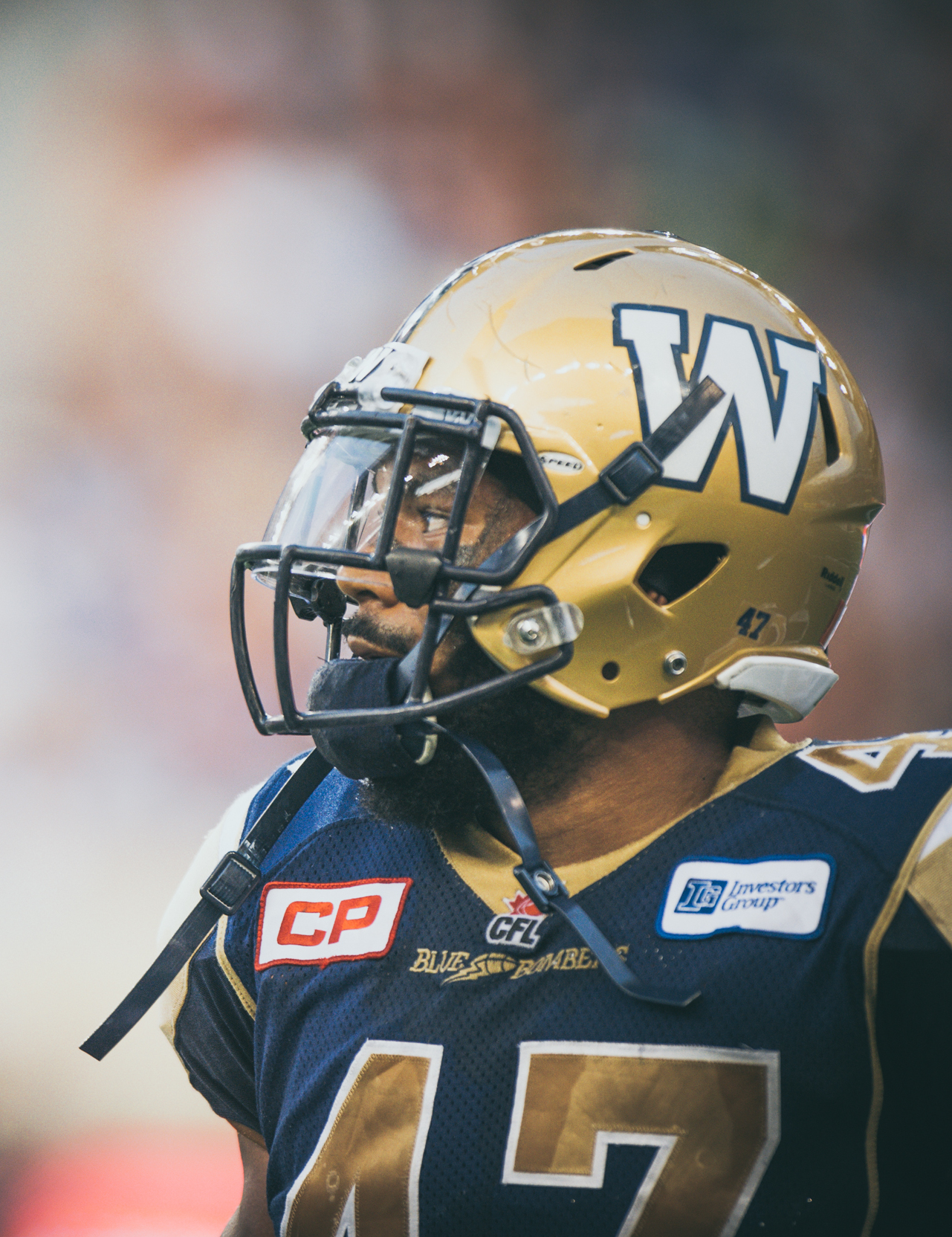

No. 47
- Position: Linebacker

Personal information
- Born: June 2, 1990 (age 36); Encino, California, U.S.
- Listed height: 6 ft 0 in (1.83 m)
- Listed weight: 228 lb (103 kg)

Career information
- College: Portland State
- NFL draft: 2013: undrafted

Career history
- Green Bay Blizzard (2015)*; Winnipeg Blue Bombers (2015–2016); Ottawa Redblacks (2017); Toronto Argonauts (2017–2018); Atlanta Legends (2019)
- * Offseason or practice squad member only

Awards and highlights
- Grey Cup champion (2017)

Khalil Bass (born June 2, 1990) is an American former professional football linebacker. He played in the Canadian Football League (CFL), where he made his debut with the Winnipeg Blue Bombers in 2015, and also played for the Ottawa Redblacks and Toronto Argonauts where he won the 105th Grey Cup. He also played for the Atlanta Legends of the Alliance of American Football (AAF).

== Professional career ==
=== Winnipeg Blue Bombers ===
Coming out of Portland State University, Bass went unsigned following his graduation in 2013. While training, Bass made ends meet by caring for dogs at a pet daycare. It took a combined 7 workouts with 4 CFL teams before Bass made a roster; the BC Lions felt Bass lacked coverage skills and the Ottawa Redblacks had concerns about his speed and movement in space. After signing with the arena football Green Bay Blizzard in anticipation for the 2015 Indoor Football League season, Bass ended up being on the IFL exempt list for the year as he received a CFL opportunity. The day after a workout with the Saskatchewan Roughriders, Bass had his 4th workout in two and a half years with the Winnipeg Blue Bombers, who signed him on February 23, 2015 as an undrafted free agent. He made the team, and played in all 18 games his rookie year, finishing 4th in the league with 99 tackles. Bass also recorded 5 sacks, forced a fumble, and intercepted a pass which he returned for a touchdown. His performance earned him the honors of Most Outstanding Rookie for the Blue Bombers team. The following year, Bass helped the Bombers earn a playoff berth by putting up 82 tackles, 4 sacks, 4 forced fumbles, and 2 interceptions of which one was returned for a score. He became a free agent at the end of the season.

=== Ottawa Redblacks ===
Bass signed with the Ottawa Redblacks on February 15, 2017. In 11 games, he made 39 tackles and 2 sacks, but asked for and was granted his release on September 15, due to a lack of playing time. Despite his desire to return to the Blue Bombers, where he had led the team in tackles the previous two seasons, Winnipeg did not seek a reunion with Bass.

=== Toronto Argonauts ===
On October 3, 2017, Bass signed with the Toronto Argonauts. He was promoted to the active roster for the final game of the regular season, but an injury kept Bass out of the playoffs. Nevertheless, the Argos advanced to the 105th Grey Cup and won 27–24 over the Calgary Stampeders. Bass received a contract extension during the offseason, but was released following week 2. Ironically, all of Bass's roommates in Toronto ended up released or traded before the season was ended. In his CFL career, Bass played in 48 games and recorded 223 tackles, 5 special teams tackles, 11 sacks, 3 interceptions of which 2 were returned for touchdowns, and 5 forced fumbles.

=== Atlanta Legends ===
In 2018, Bass was announced as an inaugural player for the Atlanta Legends of the newly-formed Alliance of American Football, which began playing games in February 2019. Bass was named to the main roster at the end of training camp on January 30, 2019. In the eight games he played prior to the league suspending operations in April 2019, he recorded 26 tackles.

=== Retirement ===
Bass was eligible to be drafted in the XFL positional draft taking place in October 2019. Despite speculation that Bass would be reunited with former Argo head coach Marc Trestman and linebacker coach Mike Archer, Bass went unselected, focusing instead on starting a personal trainer business and raising a family.
