= Billy Devaney =

American football executive (born 1955)

Profile
- Position: General manager

Personal information
- Born: March 7, 1955 (age 71); Red Bank, New Jersey, U.S.

Career information
- College: Elon

Career history
- Washington Redskins (1979–1982) College scout; Washington Redskins (1983–1990) Pro scout; San Diego Chargers (1990–2000) Director of player personnel; San Francisco 49ers (2001–2003) Pro personnel assistant; Atlanta Falcons (2006) Senior personnel executive; Atlanta Falcons (2007) Assistant general manager; St. Louis Rams (2008) Executive vice president of player personnel; St. Louis Rams (2008–2011) General manager; University of Nebraska-Lincoln (2016–2017) Executive director of player personnel; Atlanta Legends (2018–2019) General manager; New Jersey Generals (2023) General manager
- Executive profile at Pro Football Reference

William Joseph Peter Francis Devaney (born March 7, 1955) is an American football executive who was recently the general manager of the New Jersey Generals of the United States Football League (USFL), a position he has held since 2023. Prior to that Devaney was a football executive. He was the general manager for the St. Louis Rams of the National Football League from 2008 to 2011. He used to be an assistant to the general manager with the Atlanta Falcons. He replaced the longtime Rams president of football operations, Jay Zygmunt, at the end of the 2008 season.

Devaney began his career serving as the director of pro personnel under Bobby Beathard during his time with the San Diego Chargers from 1990 to 2000. He also worked a brief stint with the San Francisco 49ers for three seasons. Devaney then worked with the CBS pregame show for two years. In 2006 Devaney began working as an assistant to Rich McKay, president and former general manager of the Atlanta Falcons from 2006 to early 2008. In February 2008 the St. Louis Rams hired him as vice president of pro personnel to help conduct their 2008 draft. He was promoted to general manager of the Rams on December 24, 2008. He made his first major hire as the Rams' general manager on January 17, 2009, when the Rams announced that Steve Spagnuolo would be its new head coach. Since the hiring he had revamped the entire front office of the Rams. He was fired at the end of the 2011 season after a 10–38 record as GM.

Devaney was raised in the Leonardo section of Middletown Township, New Jersey, and attended Mater Dei High School. He went on to attend Elon University.

On February 24, 2016, Devaney was hired by the University of Nebraska as executive director of player personnel and special assistant to the head coach for the football team. Proceeding the firing of Mike Riley, Devaney was fired on December 15, 2017. In 2018, the Alliance of American Football named him the general manager of the Atlanta Legends.

In 2022, the United States Football League named Devaney the general manager of the New Jersey Generals. On January 1, 2024, it was announced the Generals would not be a part of the UFL Merger.
