= Will Corbin =

American gridiron football player (born 1990)

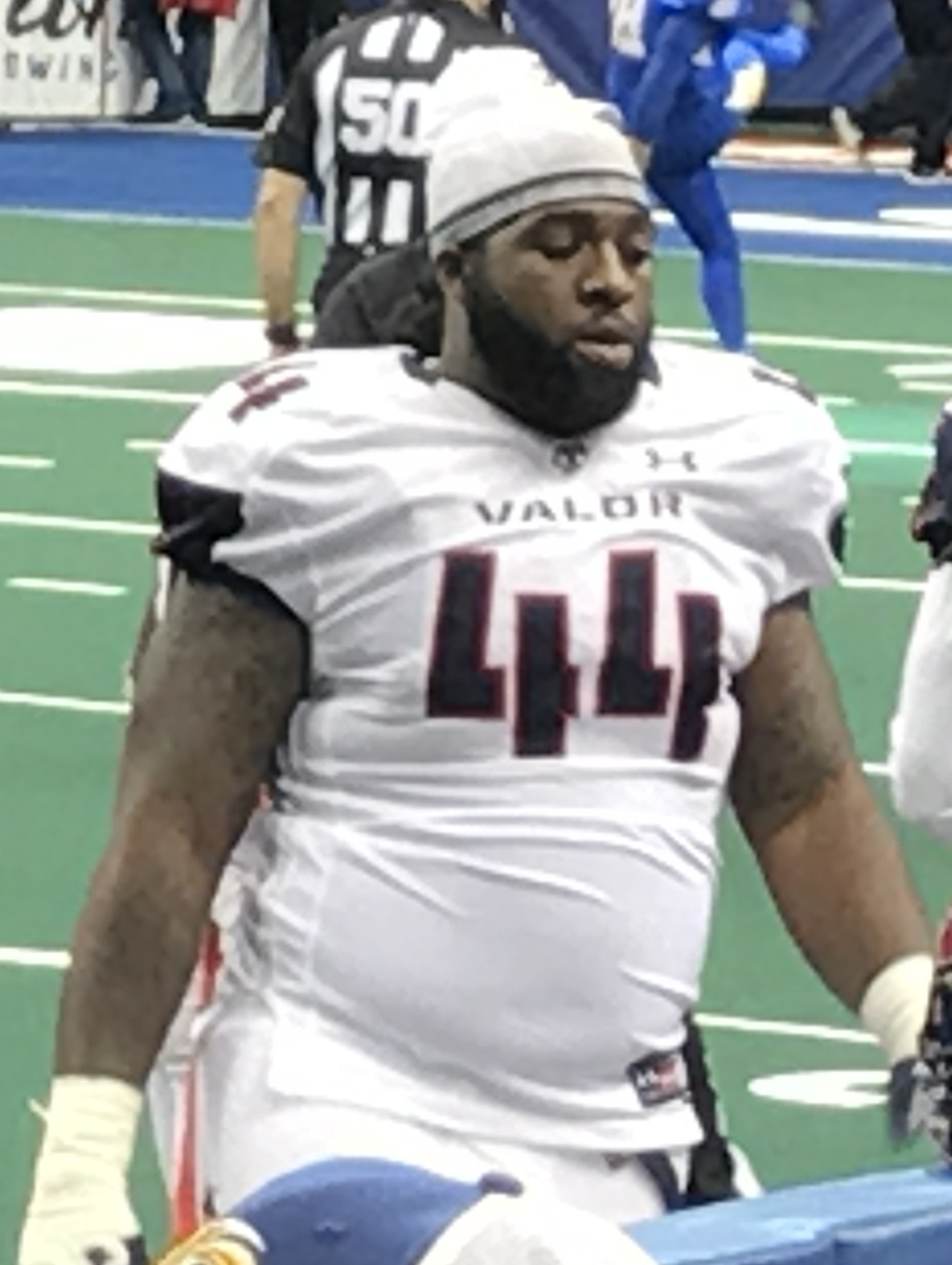
- Corbin with the Washington Valor in 2017

No. 44, 79
- Position: Offensive guard

Personal information
- Born: December 8, 1990 (age 35); Dunn, North Carolina, U.S.
- Listed height: 6 ft 6 in (1.98 m)
- Listed weight: 305 lb (138 kg)

Career information
- High school: Erwin (NC) Triton
- College: Appalachian State
- NFL draft: 2015: undrafted

Career history
- Indianapolis Colts (2015)*; Jacksonville Jaguars (2015)*; Saskatchewan Roughriders (2016)*; Washington Valor (2017–2018); Atlanta Legends (2019); Washington Valor (2019)
- * Offseason or practice squad member only

Awards and highlights
- ArenaBowl champion (2018)

Career AFL statistics
- Carries: 32
- Rushing yards: 154
- Rushing TDs: 3
- Receiving yards: 15
- Receiving TDs: 0
- Stats at ArenaFan.com

William Dearis Corbin (born December 8, 1990) is an American former professional football offensive guard. He played college football for the Appalachian State Mountaineers. He was a member of the Indianapolis Colts, Jacksonville Jaguars, Saskatchewan Roughriders, Washington Valor, and Atlanta Legends.

== Early life ==
William Dearis Corbin was born on December 8, 1990, in Dunn, North Carolina. He attended Triton High School in Erwin, North Carolina, where he played football.

== College career ==
Corbin played for the Appalachian State Mountaineers from 2010 to 2014. He was the team's starter his final three years and helped the Mountaineers to 27 wins. He played in 35 games during his career including 30 starts at right tackle. Corbin started as a defensive lineman before moving to the offensive line due to injures during the 2010 season. Corbin appeared in two games as a defensive lineman.

== Professional career ==
On May 26, 2015, Corbin was signed by the Indianapolis Colts after a tryout. On July 27, 2015, Corbin was released by the Colts.

On August 24, 2015, Corbin signed with the Jacksonville Jaguars. Corbin was released September 4, 2015, after two preseason games with the Jaguars.

Corbin signed with the Saskatchewan Roughriders on May 30, 2016. Corbin was released on June 12, 2016.

Corbin was assigned to the Washington Valor on January 10, 2017.

In 2019, Corbin played in two games for the Atlanta Legends of the Alliance of American Football. He finished the 2019 season with the AFL's Washington Valor.
