= Kevin Coyle =

American football coach (born 1956)

Biographical details
- Born: January 14, 1956 (age 70); Staten Island, New York, U.S.
- Education: University of Cincinnati

Playing career
- 1977–1978: UMass
- Position: Defensive back

Coaching career (HC unless noted)
- 1978–1979: Cincinnati (GA)
- 1980: Arkansas (assistant)
- 1981: Merchant Marine (DC)
- 1982–1985: Holy Cross (assistant)
- 1986–1990: Holy Cross (DC)
- 1991–1993: Syracuse (DC)
- 1994–1996: Maryland (DC)
- 1997–2000: Fresno State (DC)
- 2001–2002: Cincinnati Bengals (CB)
- 2003–2011: Cincinnati Bengals (DB)
- 2012–2015: Miami Dolphins (DC)
- 2016–2017: Cincinnati Bengals (DB)
- 2018: LSU (def. analyst)
- 2019: Atlanta Legends
- 2019–2021: LSU (sr. def. analyst)
- 2022–2024: Fresno State (DC)
- 2025: Syracuse (sr. def. analyst)
- 2025: UCLA (Interim DC)

Head coaching record
- Overall: 2–6 (AAF)

Kevin Coyle (born January 14, 1956) is an American football coach who most recently was the interim defensive coordinator for the UCLA Bruins. He was previously a senior defensive analyst at Syracuse.

== Early years ==
Raised in New Dorp, Staten Island, in 1974 Coyle graduated from Monsignor Farrell High School in Oakwood, Staten Island. He was inducted into the Staten Island Sports Hall of Fame in 2011.

== Coaching career ==
Coyle was a senior analyst for the LSU Tigers from 2019 to 2021. In October 2018, Coyle agreed to become the defensive coordinator for the Atlanta Legends of the Alliance of American Football (AAF), taking over the position upon completing the 2018 college football season with LSU. On January 9, 2019, he was promoted to head coach after Brad Childress resigned from the position.

Coyle also spent 13 seasons with the Cincinnati Bengals of the National Football League (NFL).

== Head coaching record ==
=== AAF ===
Team	Year	Regular season					Postseason			
Team	Year	Won	Lost	Ties	Win %	Finish	Won	Lost	Win %	Result
ATL	2019	2	6	0	.250		–	–	–	–
Total		2	6	0	.250		–	–	–	–

== See also ==
- List of people from Staten Island § Football
