= Jeff Overbaugh =

American football player (born 1993)

No. 44, 46
- Position: Long snapper

Personal information
- Born: November 24, 1993 (age 32); Santa Fe, New Mexico, U.S.
- Listed height: 6 ft 2 in (1.88 m)
- Listed weight: 234 lb (106 kg)

Career information
- High school: Anchorage (AK) Service
- College: San Diego State
- NFL draft: 2016: undrafted

Career history
- Los Angeles Rams (2016)*; Denver Broncos (2017)*; Chicago Bears (2017)*; Minnesota Vikings (2017); Atlanta Falcons (2018); Atlanta Legends (2019)
- * Offseason or practice squad member only

Career NFL statistics
- Games played: 2
- Games started: 0
- Stats at Pro Football Reference

Jeff Overbaugh (born November 24, 1993) is an American former professional football player who was a long snapper in the National Football League (NFL). He played college football for the San Diego State Aztecs.

== Professional career ==
=== Los Angeles Rams ===
Overbaugh signed with the Los Angeles Rams as an undrafted free agent on June 10, 2016. He was waived by the Rams on August 30, 2016.

=== Denver Broncos ===
On January 2, 2017, Overbaugh signed a future contract with the Denver Broncos. He was waived by the Broncos on May 4, 2017.

=== Chicago Bears ===
On August 28, 2017, Overbaugh signed with the Chicago Bears following an injury to Patrick Scales. He was waived by the Bears on September 3, 2017, after the team claimed Andrew DePaola off waivers.

=== Minnesota Vikings ===
On December 26, 2017, Overbaugh signed with the Minnesota Vikings following an injury to Kevin McDermott.

=== Atlanta Falcons ===
On September 2, 2018, Overbaugh was signed to the Atlanta Falcons' practice squad. He was promoted to the active roster on September 6, 2018, due to an injury to Josh Harris. He was waived on September 10, 2018.

=== Atlanta Legends ===
On December 27, 2018, Overbaugh signed with the Atlanta Legends. The league ceased operations in April 2019.

== In popular culture ==
=== The Conners ===
In the episode "Smoking Penguins and Santa on Santa Action", the kids buy Dan Conner a Chicago Bears game-worn jersey for his birthday. When Dan sees the name Overbaugh he asks who he is. Darlene explains that he was the long snapper that played for the Bears for a week in 2017 and that she thinks that Overbaugh was the only other bidder for the jersey. Dan is excited to have the jersey.
