= Lou Young (cornerback) =

American football player (born 1991)

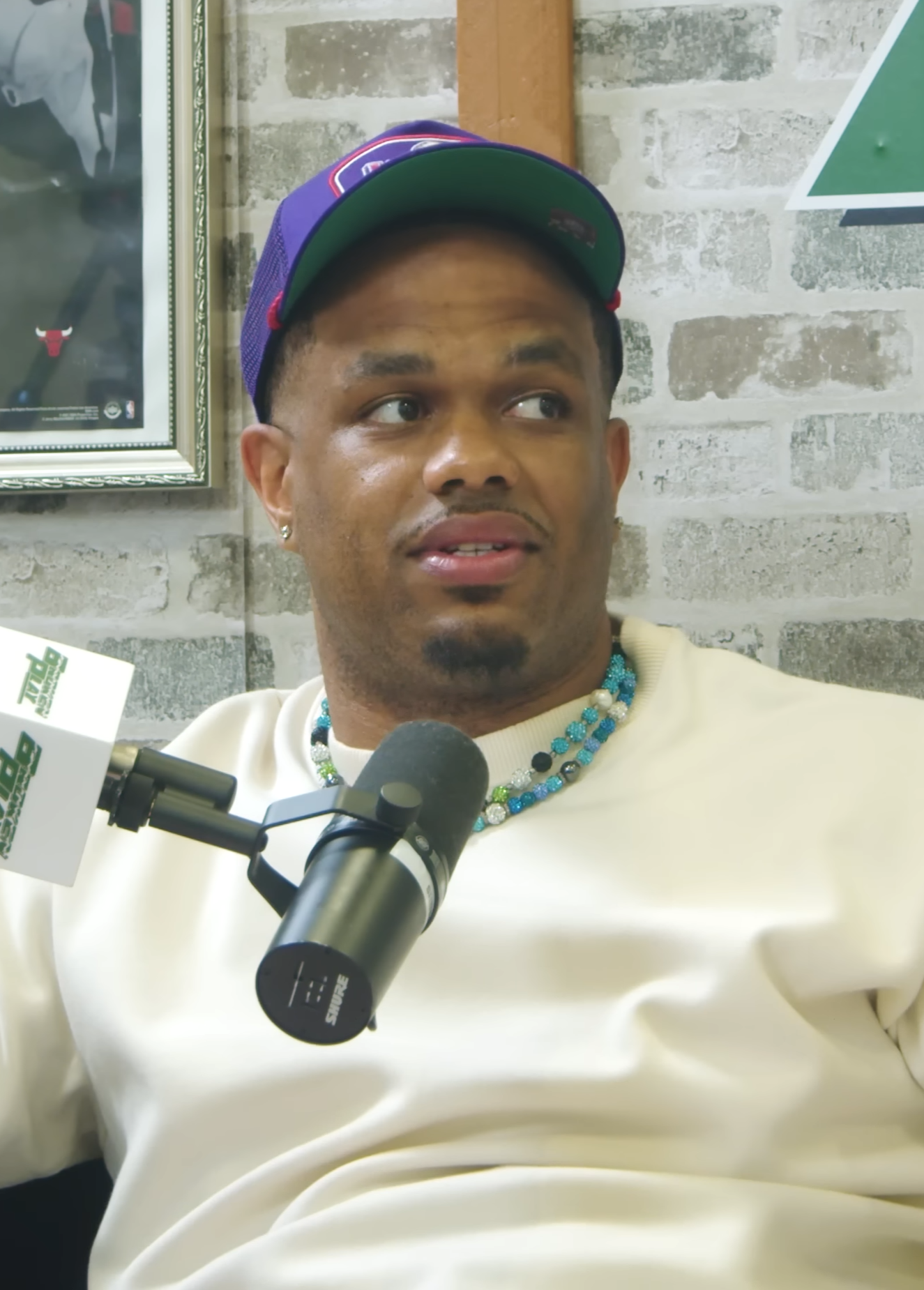
- Young in 2024

No. 25
- Position: Cornerback

Personal information
- Born: October 9, 1991 (age 35); Washington, DC, U.S.
- Listed height: 6 ft 1 in (1.85 m)
- Listed weight: 205 lb (93 kg)

Career information
- High school: Our Lady of Good Counsel (Olney, Maryland)
- College: Georgia Tech
- NFL draft: 2014: undrafted

Career history
- Denver Broncos (2014)*; Baltimore Ravens (2014)*; Jacksonville Jaguars (2014)*; Carolina Panthers (2014–2016); Washington Redskins (2017)*; Arizona Cardinals (2018)*; Atlanta Legends (2019)*
- * Offseason or practice squad member only

Career NFL statistics
- Total tackles: 1
- Stats at Pro Football Reference

Louis James Young III (born October 9, 1991) is an American comedian and former professional football cornerback. He played college football at Georgia Tech.

He is also best known for his viral video parodies on various social media platforms as well as his new podcast series The Lou Young Show on YouTube.

== Professional career ==
=== Denver Broncos ===
On May 12, 2014, Young was signed as an undrafted free agent by the Denver Broncos. On August 30, 2014, he was released by the Broncos.

=== Baltimore Ravens ===
On September 15, 2014, the Baltimore Ravens signed Young to their practice squad. On October 9, 2014, his practice squad contract was terminated by the Ravens.

=== Jacksonville Jaguars ===
On October 21, 2014, the Jacksonville Jaguars signed Young to their practice squad. On November 11, 2014, he was released by the Jaguars.

=== Carolina Panthers ===
On November 24, 2014, the Carolina Panthers signed Young to their practice squad. On January 13, 2015, he was signed to a reserve/future contract by the Panthers. On September 5, 2015, he was released by the Panthers. On September 7, 2015, Young was signed to the Panthers' practice squad. He was promoted to the active roster on January 5, 2016.

On February 7, 2016, Young's Panthers played in Super Bowl 50. He was inactive for the game as the Panthers fell to the Denver Broncos by a score of 24–10.

On September 3, 2016, Young was waived by the Panthers as part of final roster cuts. He was signed to the practice squad on October 12, 2016. He was promoted to the active roster on October 15, 2016. He was released on October 17, 2016. He was re-signed to the practice squad on November 3, 2016. He was promoted back to the active roster on November 25, 2016.

On May 2, 2017, Young was waived by the Panthers.

=== Washington Redskins ===
On June 7, 2017, Young was signed by the Washington Redskins. He was waived/injured by the Redskins on July 29, 2017, and placed on injured reserve. He was waived with an injury settlement on August 3, 2017.

=== Arizona Cardinals ===
On February 12, 2018, Young was signed by the Arizona Cardinals. On August 15, 2018, Young was waived by the Cardinals.

=== Atlanta Legends ===
Young joined the Alliance of American Football's Atlanta Legends, but failed to make the final roster.
