= Younghoe Koo =

South Korean-American football player (born 1994)

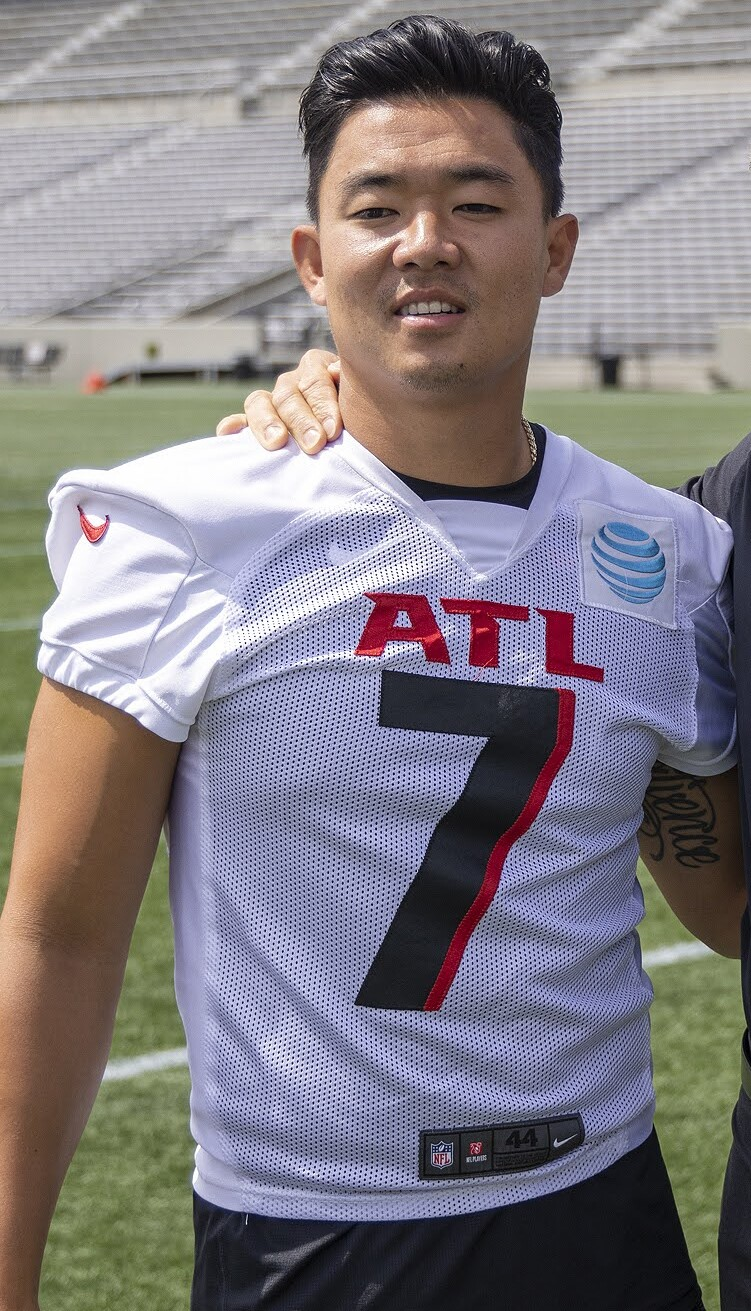
- Koo with the Atlanta Falcons in 2022

Profile
- Position: Placekicker

Personal information
- Born: August 3, 1994 (age 32); Seoul, South Korea
- Listed height: 5 ft 9 in (1.75 m)
- Listed weight: 185 lb (84 kg)

Career information
- High school: Ridgewood (Ridgewood, New Jersey, U.S.)
- College: Georgia Southern (2013–2016)
- NFL draft: 2017: undrafted

Career history
- Los Angeles Chargers (2017); Atlanta Legends (2019); New England Patriots (2019)*; Atlanta Falcons (2019–2025); New York Giants (2025); New York Jets (2026)*
- * Offseason or practice squad member only

Awards and highlights
- Pro Bowl (2020); NFL scoring co-leader (2020) (Note: Tied with Daniel Carlson and Jason Sanders.); First-team All-Sun Belt (2016)

Career NFL statistics
- Field goals made: 185
- Field goals attempted: 217
- Field goal %: 85.3%
- Points: 741
- Longest field goal: 58
- Touchbacks: 94
- Stats at Pro Football Reference

Other information

Korean name
- Hangul: 구영회
- RR: Gu Yeonghoe
- MR: Ku Yŏnghoe

Younghoe Koo (Korean: 구영회; pronounced /ˈjʌŋweɪ/; YUNG-way-GU; born August 3, 1994) is a South Korean–American professional football placekicker. Known for his ability to successfully execute onside kicks, Koo played college football at Georgia Southern before signing with the Los Angeles Chargers in 2017 as an undrafted free agent.

Koo played four seasons of college football for the Georgia Southern Eagles and was named a finalist for the Lou Groza Award in 2016. He began his professional career with the Los Angeles Chargers in 2017, but was released four weeks into the season after missing consecutive game-ending kicks. Following a year away from football, Koo played for the Atlanta Legends of the Alliance of American Football (AAF), scoring the first points in league history and converting all of his kicks until the AAF indefinitely suspended operations. Koo returned to the NFL with the Atlanta Falcons the same year. In 2020, Koo was named to the Pro Bowl after leading the league in scoring.

After being released by the Falcons in 2025, Koo briefly played for the New York Giants.

== Early life ==
Koo was born on August 3, 1994, in Seoul, South Korea. He played soccer growing up and won a regional kicking competition in South Korea. He moved to the United States when he was 12 years old to live with his mother, who had gone to New Jersey two years earlier to work as a nurse while Koo's father remained in Seoul as a professor at Induk University.

Koo played on the football team for Ridgewood High School in Ridgewood, New Jersey. He was named team MVP his senior season, contributing on both special teams and defense, where he tallied six interceptions.

== College career ==
At Georgia Southern University, Koo was a four-year contributor for the Eagles, earning first-team all-conference honors in the Sun Belt Conference in his final season, during which he converted 19 of 20 field goal attempts (95%). He was also named a finalist for the Lou Groza Award, given annually to the best college kicker in the nation.

At the conclusion of his college career, Koo had converted 89.7% of his field goal attempts (26/29) and 96.9% of his extra point attempts (62/64), both Georgia Southern team records, and he finished 9th in school history for points scored, with 140.

== Professional career ==
Pre-draft measurables
Height	Weight	Arm length	Hand span	Wingspan
5 ft 9 3/8 in (1.76 m)	182 lb (83 kg)	29 1/4 in (0.74 m)	9 in (0.23 m)	5 ft 10 3/4 in (1.80 m)
All values from Pro Day

=== Los Angeles Chargers ===
Koo signed with the Los Angeles Chargers as an undrafted free agent following the 2017 NFL draft. He won the starting job over incumbent kicker Josh Lambo following the conclusion of the preseason. Koo became the fourth player in NFL history to have been born in South Korea. (Note: He joined John Lee, Hines Ward, and Kyle Love)

In the 2017 season opener on the road against the Denver Broncos, Koo's game-tying 44-yard field goal attempt in the final seconds of the game was blocked by the Broncos' Shelby Harris, and the Chargers lost 24–21. The kick had little chance of succeeding after Denver overwhelmed the Chargers' line on the play. An earlier attempt by Koo was successful, but it was called off after the Broncos had called a timeout right before the snap. The following week, Koo missed a game-winning 44-yard attempt in a 19–17 loss to the Miami Dolphins.

The following two weeks, Koo converted both of his field goal attempts and all four of his extra points. However, the 0–4 Chargers waived him after Week 4, replacing him with 10-year veteran Nick Novak. Chargers head coach Anthony Lynn stated that he wanted "someone with a little more consistency and experience" than Koo. Lynn added that, "I think Koo is going to have a long NFL career ... A lot of rookies get cut early in their career, and they come back and play for a lot of years." "Koo's a very talented kicker," Novak said. "He's got a live leg and a lot of talent." Overall with the Chargers, Koo was 3-of-6 on field goals and recorded 8 touchbacks on 14 kickoffs. Frank Schwab of Yahoo Sports wrote that the winless Chargers were "using [Koo] as a scapegoat."

=== Atlanta Legends ===
On January 14, 2019, Koo signed with the Atlanta Legends of the Alliance of American Football (AAF). On February 9, he scored the first points in AAF regular season history, making a 38-yard field goal against the Orlando Apollos. After the Legends started the 2019 AAF season 0–3, on March 3, Koo kicked two field goals, including the 33-yard game winner, against the Arizona Hotshots to seal the 14–11 Atlanta win. The following week against the Memphis Express, he made all three of his attempts, including the game-winning 35-yard field goal with nine seconds remaining to secure a 23–20 victory, and was eventually named AAF Special Teams Player of the Week. The league ceased operations during midseason in April 2019. For the year, Koo had been a perfect 14-of-14 on his field goals.

=== New England Patriots ===
Following the suspension of the AAF, Koo worked out with the Chicago Bears, who were in need of a kicker after releasing Cody Parkey, but did not end up signing with the team. After longtime kicker Stephen Gostkowski was placed on injured reserve, the New England Patriots signed Koo to their practice squad on October 4, 2019. On October 15, 2019 Koo was released by New England.

=== Atlanta Falcons ===
==== 2019 season ====
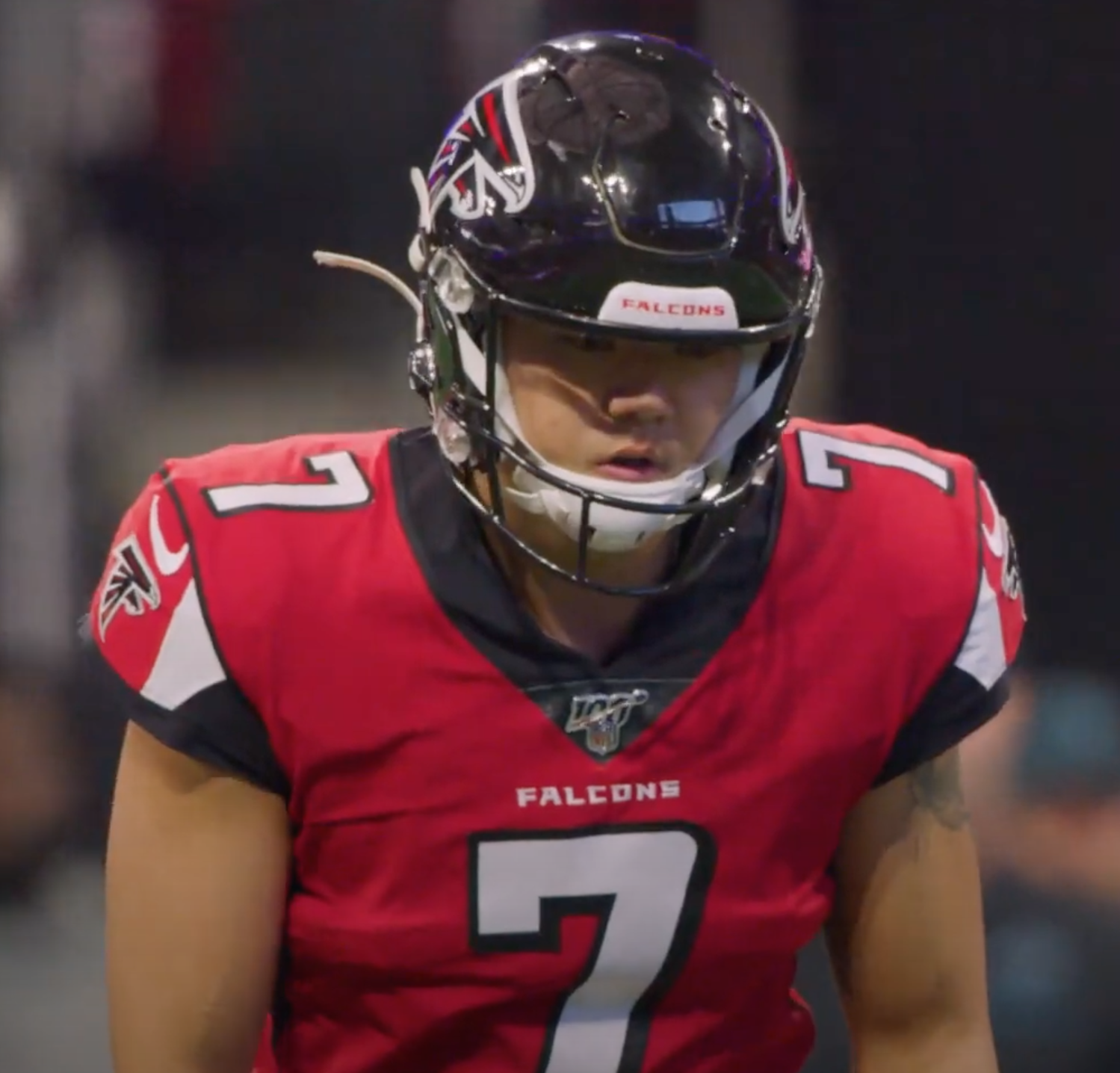
Koo in 2019

On October 29, 2019, Koo was signed by the Atlanta Falcons after they cut their longtime kicker and franchise leading scorer, Matt Bryant. In his Falcons debut, Koo made all four of his field goals (including a 48-yarder) and both of his extra points in a 26–9 upset win over the New Orleans Saints. He was named the NFC Special Teams Player of the Week for his performance. In Week 13 against the New Orleans Saints on Thanksgiving Day, Koo delivered three successful onside kicks, one of which was undone by a penalty, in the 26–18 loss. In Week 14 against the Carolina Panthers, Koo made four field goals (including a then career-long 50-yarder), four extra points, and recovered a fumble forced by teammate Damontae Kazee on wide receiver Greg Dortch during a kickoff return in the 40–20 win. For this performance, he was named the NFC Special Teams Player of the Week for the second time. In eight games in the 2019 season, he finished converting 23 of 26 field goal attempts and 15 of 16 extra point attempts.

==== 2020 season ====
On February 18, 2020, Koo signed a one-year contract extension with the Falcons. In Week 2 against the Dallas Cowboys, Koo made all four of his field goal attempts, and all three of his extra points in the 39–40 loss. In Week 5 against the Panthers, Koo made both of his field goal attempts (including a career-long 54-yarder), in the 16-23 loss. In Week 6 against the Minnesota Vikings, Koo went 4-for-4 on field goals, as well as 4-for-4 on extra points, in the 40–23 win. In Week 8 against the Panthers, Koo made all four of his field goal attempts in the 25–17 win. In Week 12 against the Las Vegas Raiders, Koo made a career-high 5 field goals in the 43–6 blowout win. For his efforts in the month of November, Koo was named NFC Special Teams Player of the Month. Koo became the NFL's leading scorer following Week 13, having made 32 of 33 field goals and 23 extra points for a total of 119 points. In Week 16 against the Kansas City Chiefs, Koo missed a game-tying 39-yard field goal in the 14–17 loss after the ball was tipped by the Chiefs' Tanoh Kpassagnon.

On December 20, 2020, Koo was selected to his first Pro Bowl. He finished the 2020 season converting 37 of 39 field goal attempts and 33 of 36 extra point attempts. He signed a contract extension with the Falcons on March 11, 2021.

==== 2021 season ====
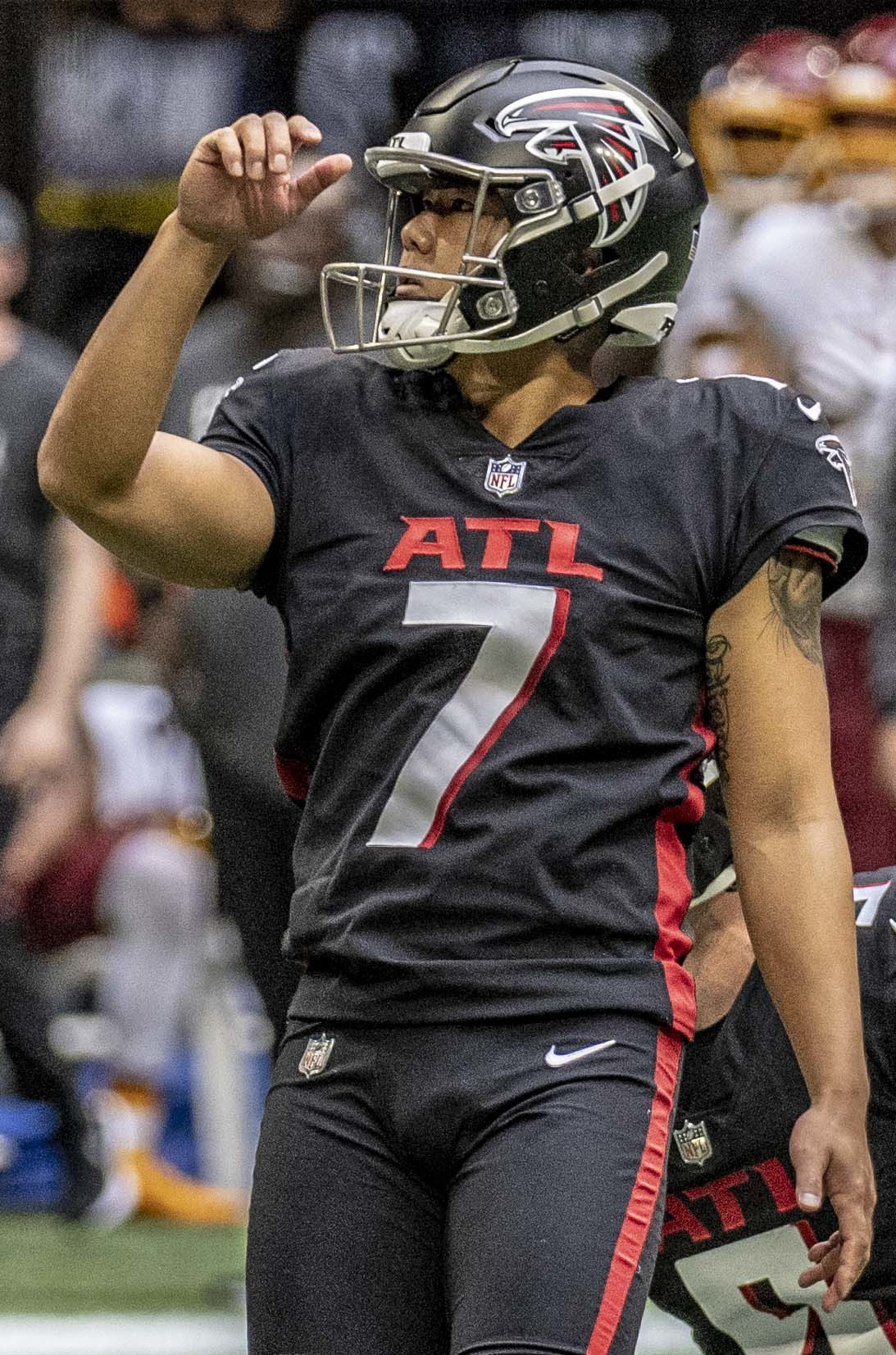
Koo in 2021

In Week 3, Koo made a game winning 40-yard field goal as time expired to defeat the New York Giants 17–14. Koo made another game-winning field goal in Week 7 against the Dolphins to give the Falcons a 30–28 win as time expired. Koo made his third game-ending field goal of the season in a 27–25 Week 9 road win over the Saints. He finished the 2021 season converting 27 of 29 field goal attempts and all 30 extra point attempts.

==== 2022 season ====
On March 15, 2022, Koo signed a five-year, $24.25 million contract extension with the Falcons. In Week 8 against the Panthers, Koo made a game winning 41-yard field goal to give the Falcons a 37–34 overtime win. In Week 17 against the Arizona Cardinals, Koo made another game-winning field goal to give the Falcons a 20–19 win as time expired. Koo converted all 12 field goal attempts and all seven extra point attempts in the months of December and January. For his efforts, he was named NFC Special Teams Player Of The Month. He finished the 2022 season converting 32 of 37 field goal attempts and 33 of 35 extra point attempts.

==== 2023 season ====
In Week 2 against the Green Bay Packers, Koo kicked a go-ahead game-winning field goal with less than a minute left to give the Falcons a 25–24 win. In Week 5 against the Houston Texans, Koo kicked a field goal as time expired to give Atlanta a 21–19 victory. For the third time, in Week 7 against the Tampa Bay Buccaneers, Koo kicked a game-winning 51 yard field goal as time expired and was named NFC Special Teams Player of the Week for his performance. Koo was again named NFC Special Teams Player of the Week after his Week 16 performance against the Indianapolis Colts, going 5-for-5 on field goals. He finished the 2023 season converting 32 of 37 field goal attempts and 27 of 28 extra point attempts.

==== 2024 season ====
In a Week 4 divisional matchup against the New Orleans Saints, Koo went 4-for-4 on field goals, including a career-long 58-yard field goal to put the Falcons ahead in the final seconds as they won 26–24. The following week against the Tampa Bay Buccaneers, he hit a game-tying 52-yard field goal to end regulation as the Falcons went on to win in overtime 36–30. On December 18, 2024, Koo was placed on injured reserve with a hip injury. He finished the 2024 season converting 25 of 34 field goal attempts and all 26 extra point attempts.

==== 2025 season ====
In Week 1 against the Tampa Bay Buccaneers, Koo would make two out of three field goal attempts and both extra point attempts, but missed a game–tying 43 yard field goal which would have sent the game into overtime. He was benched the following week as the Falcons signed John Parker Romo, who kicked in Week 2 against the Minnesota Vikings. After seven seasons, Koo was released by the Falcons on September 19, two days before Week 3 against the Carolina Panthers.

=== New York Giants ===
On September 23, 2025, Koo was signed to the New York Giants' practice squad. In Week 10, on November 9, 2025, Koo made his first start for the Giants due to an injury to kicker Graham Gano. Koo was perfect in his Giants debut, making two field goals and two extra points. Koo gained attention after a field goal attempt in a game against the New England Patriots, in which his foot missed the football and kicked the ground, leaving the holder, Jamie Gillan, with the ball. The Giants went on to lose the game 33–15. After the game, Koo told reporters that he saw the ball moving as he approached it, so he halted his kicking motion.

Following a Week 15 loss to the Washington Commanders, in which the Giants fell 29–21, Koo was waived on December 16, 2025. During the game, Koo missed two 54-yard field goal attempts at pivotal moments; the first occurred while the Giants trailed 3–0, and the second while the score was 22–14. Both misses resulted in a change of possession that provided the Commanders with advantageous field position and hindered the Giants' efforts to keep the score within a single possession.

=== New York Jets ===
On May 27, 2026, Koo signed a one-year contract with the New York Jets. On June 3, he was waived after the Jets signed Jason Sanders.

== NFL career statistics ==
Legend
	Led the league
**Bold**	Career high

=== Regular season ===
Year	Team	GP	Field goals									Extra points			Total points
Year	Team	GP	FGM	FGA	FG%	<20	20−29	30−39	40−49	50+	Lng	XPM	XPA	XP%	Total points
2017	LAC	4	3	6	50.0	0–0	2–2	0–0	1–4	0–0	41	9	9	**100.0**	18
2019	ATL	8	23	26	88.5	0–0	6–6	9–10	7–9	1–1	50	15	16	93.8	84
2020	ATL	15	**37**	**39**	**94.9**	0–0	10–10	11–12	8–9	8–8	54	**33**	**36**	91.7	**144**
2021	ATL	17	27	29	93.1	0–0	8–8	9–9	6–7	4–5	54	30	30	**100.0**	111
2022	ATL	17	32	37	86.5	0–0	9–9	7–7	9–10	7–11	54	**33**	35	94.3	129
2023	ATL	17	32	37	86.5	0–0	10–10	10–10	9–11	3–6	54	27	28	96.4	123
2024	ATL	14	25	34	73.5	0–0	7–7	5–7	7–11	6–9	**58**	26	26	**100.0**	101
2025	ATL	1	2	3	66.7	0–0	0–0	1–1	1–2	0–0	41	2	2	**100.0**	8
2025	NYG	6	4	6	66.7	1–1	1–1	1–1	1–1	0–2	44	11	12	91.7	23
Total		98	185	217	85.3	1–1	53−53	53−57	49−64	29−42	58	186	194	95.9	741

== Personal life ==
Koo married Ava Maurer in 2023.
