= Matt Simms (American football) =

American football player (born 1988)

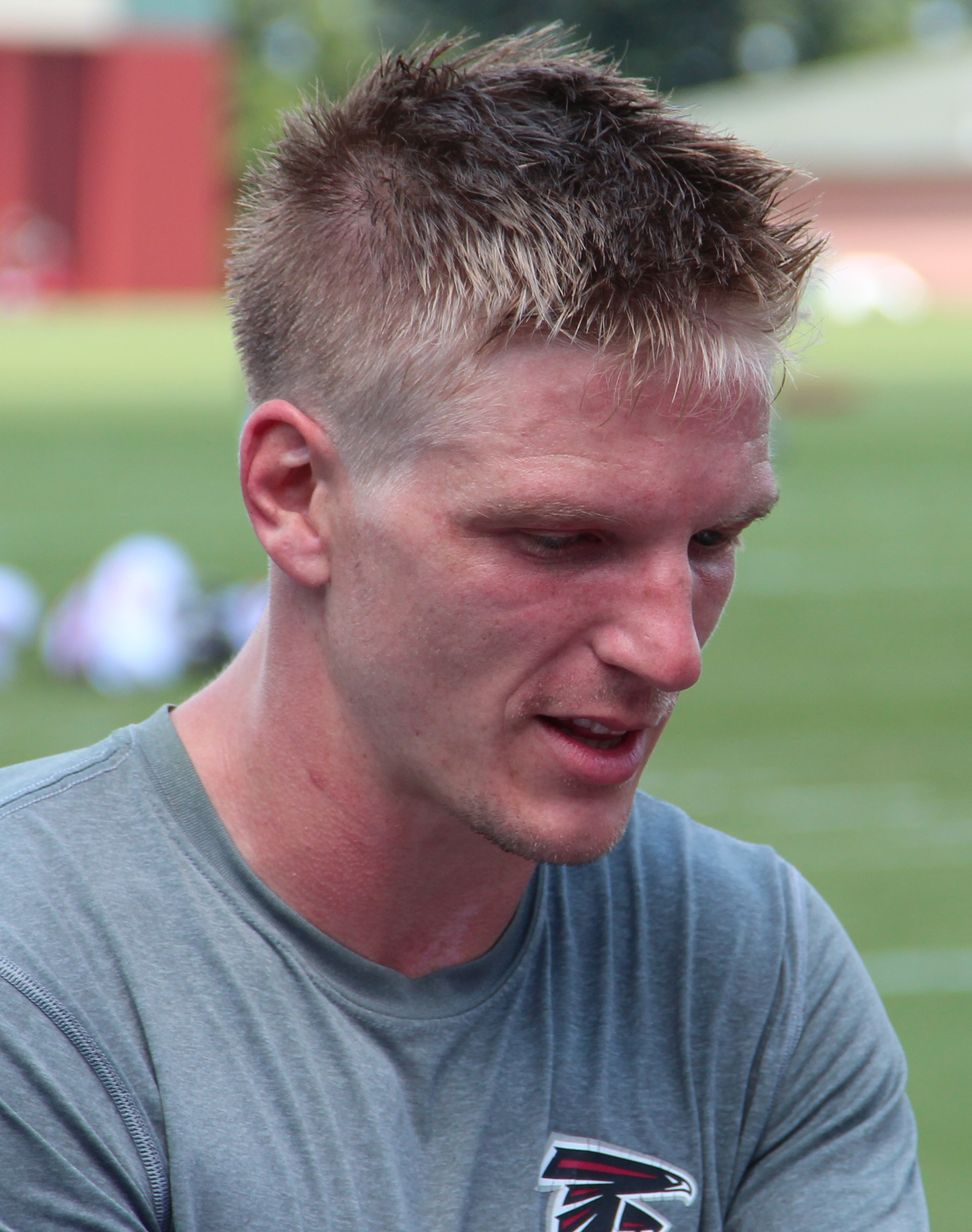
- Simms with the Atlanta Falcons in 2016

No. 5, 9
- Position: Quarterback

Personal information
- Born: September 27, 1988 (age 38); Franklin Lakes, New Jersey, U.S.
- Listed height: 6 ft 3 in (1.91 m)
- Listed weight: 210 lb (95 kg)

Career information
- High school: Don Bosco Prep (Ramsey, New Jersey)
- College: Louisville (2008); El Camino (2009); Tennessee (2010–2011)
- NFL draft: 2012: undrafted

Career history
- New York Jets (2012–2014); Buffalo Bills (2015)*; Atlanta Falcons (2015–2017)*; Memphis Express (2019)*; Atlanta Legends (2019); Atlanta Falcons (2019)
- * Offseason or practice squad member only

Career NFL statistics
- Pass attempts: 39
- Pass completions: 19
- Percentage: 48.7
- TD–INT: 1–1
- Passing yards: 195
- Passer rating: 61.4
- Stats at Pro Football Reference

Matthew Phillip Simms (born September 27, 1988) is an American former professional football player who was a quarterback in the National Football League (NFL). He played college football for the Tennessee Volunteers, before being signed by the New York Jets as an undrafted free agent in 2012. Simms is the son of former New York Giants quarterback and Super Bowl XXI MVP Phil Simms and younger brother of former NFL quarterback Chris Simms. He currently runs a non-NFL-sponsored private quarterback training camp and podcast under the name "Simms Complete."

== Early life ==
Simms was born in Franklin Lakes, New Jersey to Diana and Phil Simms. His older brother, Chris, played quarterback for the Tampa Bay Buccaneers following an extraordinary career at Ramapo High School. Matt attended Don Bosco Preparatory High School in Ramsey, New Jersey where he played quarterback on the football team for three years. During this time, he passed for more than 6,000 yards and 60 touchdowns. Though the team lost the state championship game his junior year, he was selected as a first-team All-State player by the Associated Press. The next year, they went undefeated and won the state title. After his senior year, he played in the U.S. Army All-American Bowl.

== College career ==
After graduating from high school, Simms received a scholarship to the University of Louisville. During his freshman year, he saw limited action, playing in two games and throwing four passes. Simms then left Louisville to attend El Camino College in Torrance, California. While at El Camino he led the team to its fourth consecutive league title and threw for over 2,000 yards in ten games.

Simms later left El Camino for the University of Tennessee. As a child, he always had a dislike for Tennessee's rival, the University of Florida. During the 2010 season, he played in ten games and threw for over 1,400 yards.

During the 2010 season, Simms was hampered by injuries to key receivers. He lost the starting job late in the season to Tyler Bray due to poor performance.

Simms's performance was the subject of a widely reported "heated dispute" between Desmond Howard and Phil Simms during the week before Super Bowl XLV.

In the 2011 season, Simms appeared in seven games and started two. He was 27 of 62 for 319 passing yards and three interceptions.

=== Statistics ===
Year	Team	Games			Passing								
Year	Team	GP	GS	Record	Cmp	Att	Pct	Yds	Avg	Y/A	TD	Int	Rtg
2008	Louisville	2	0	–	4	10	40.0	39	3.9	−0.6	0	1	52.8
2009	El Camino	10	10	8–2	159	269	59.1	2,204	–	–	17	12	–
2010	Tennessee	11	8	2–6	113	159	57.9	1,460	7.5	7.2	8	5	129.3
2011	Tennessee	7	2	0–2	27	62	43.5	319	5.1	3.0	0	3	77.1
Career		30	20	10–10	144	267	53.9	1,818	6.8	5.9	8	9	114.3

== Professional career ==
Pre-draft measurables
Height	Weight	40-yard dash	10-yard split	20-yard split	20-yard shuttle	Three-cone drill	Vertical jump	Broad jump
6 ft 2 5/8 in (1.90 m)	212 lb (96 kg)	4.72 s	1.58 s	2.70 s	4.42 s	7.14 s	29.5 in (0.75 m)	9 ft 0 in (2.74 m)
All values from Tennessee Pro Day

=== New York Jets ===
==== 2012 season ====
Simms was signed by the New York Jets on May 6, 2012. He was waived on August 31, 2012. Simms signed a future/reserve contract on December 31, 2012.

==== 2013 season ====
Simms received playing time during the preseason against the Jacksonville Jaguars on August 17, 2013. He completed all five of his passes for 73 yards. Simms played the following week against the New York Giants completing 6 of his 10 pass attempts for 120 yards and a touchdown. On August 29, the final preseason contest, Simms started and played the entire game against the Philadelphia Eagles. He completed 33 of his 44 pass attempts for 285 yards.

Simms threw his first career touchdown pass to tight end Jeff Cumberland in a Week 11 37–14 loss to the Buffalo Bills. During Week 13 against the Miami Dolphins, Simms came in relief of starter Geno Smith in the third quarter; he completed 9 of his 18 passes for 79 yards with an interception and a lost fumble in the Jets' 3–23 loss. Simms appeared in three games of the 2013 season and finished the year with 156 passing yards.

==== 2014 season ====
Simms, an exclusive rights free agent, was re-signed by the Jets on January 13, 2014. He was released on August 30, 2014, during the team's final roster cuts and signed to the team's practice squad a day later. He was promoted to the active roster on November 1, 2014. He appeared in one game, a 24–10 loss to the Kansas City Chiefs, with the Jets in the 2014 season. He was 3-of-8 for 39 yards.

Simms signed a one-year contract to remain with the Jets on December 30, 2014. However, after the team drafted Bryce Petty and signed undrafted rookie Jake Heaps, Simms requested his release and was granted it on May 28, 2015.

=== Buffalo Bills ===
The Buffalo Bills claimed Simms off waivers on May 29, 2015. Simms was not expected to compete in the three-way competition for the starting quarterback position (Tyrod Taylor, EJ Manuel, and Matt Cassel) but was in the mix as a potential backup quarterback and was given the start for the Bills' final preseason game against the Detroit Lions on September 3. Late in that game, Simms, while trying to break a tackle, inadvertently threw the ball 20 yards backward, creating a loose-ball situation and setting the Lions up for the game-winning score. Simms was released the next day.

=== Atlanta Falcons (first stint) ===
On September 7, 2015, Simms was signed to the Atlanta Falcons' practice squad. On September 3, 2016, he was waived by the Falcons as part of final roster cuts and was signed to their practice squad the next day.

On May 15, 2017, Simms re-signed with the Falcons. He was waived/injured on September 2, 2017, and placed on injured reserve. He was released with an injury settlement on September 5, 2017.

=== Memphis Express ===
Simms was signed by the Memphis Express of the Alliance of American Football (AAF) for the 2019 season.

=== Atlanta Legends ===
On November 27, 2018, he was selected in the second round by the Atlanta Legends in the 2019 AAF QB Draft.

Simms started the 2019 AAF season opener against the Orlando Apollos, during which he completed 15 of 28 passes for 126 yards and two interceptions in the 40–6 loss.

=== Atlanta Falcons (second stint) ===
On August 3, 2019, Simms was signed by the Falcons to replace injured Kurt Benkert. He was placed on injured reserve on August 31, 2019.
