= Atlanta Legends =

Alliance of American Football team

Logo

General information
- Founded: 2018
- Folded: 2019
- Colors: Purple, gold & white

Personnel
- Head coach: Kevin Coyle
- President: David Livingston

Team history
- Atlanta Legends (2019)

Home fields
- Georgia State Stadium (2019)

League / conference affiliations
- Alliance of American Football: Eastern Conference (2019)

The Atlanta Legends were a professional American football franchise based in Atlanta, Georgia, and one of the eight members of the Alliance of American Football (AAF), which played one incomplete season from February 2019 to April 2019. They played their home games at Georgia State Stadium on the campus of Georgia State University. The Legends were one of two AAF teams based in a city that already had an NFL team (the Atlanta Falcons; the other team was the Arizona Hotshots, where the NFL's Cardinals were based). The Legends were coached by Kevin Coyle, one of two AAF coaches without prior head coaching experience, after the position became available when Brad Childress resigned a month before the season began. Billy Devaney was the general manager.

On April 2, 2019, the league's football operations were reportedly suspended, and on April 4 the league allowed players to leave their contracts to sign with NFL teams. The league filed for Chapter 7 bankruptcy on April 17, 2019.

== History ==
The Alliance Atlanta team was announced by the league on April 25, 2018, as its second initial team. Additionally, the head coach, Brad Childress, and offensive coordinator, Michael Vick, were announced. On September 20, the league announced for four eastern inaugural franchises' names and logos including Atlanta as the Atlanta Legends. The name and colors (purple, gold, white) are tributes to famous historical figures from the city, such as Martin Luther King Jr. and Hank Aaron.

Childress resigned a month before the start of the 2019 season, and Kevin Coyle, initially hired as the team's defensive coordinator, took Childress's place. On February 7, 2019, two days before their first game, head coach Coyle announced that Vick would be unable to fill his role as offensive coordinator and would instead act as an advisor to the team. Rich Bartel, who replaced Vick as de facto offensive coordinator and play-caller, abruptly resigned two days before the team's home opener, prompting the team to hire Ken Zampese to lead the offense.

The team's first game was at Spectrum Stadium against the Orlando Apollos on Saturday, February 9, 2019, where they lost 40–6. Their first home game was on February 24 against the Birmingham Iron, where they lost 28–12. After starting the season 0–3, the Legends recorded their first win against the Arizona Hotshots on March 3, 2019.

== Final roster ==
2019 Atlanta Legends final roster
Quarterbacks: 1 Justin Holman; 11 Aaron Murray; 6 Peter Pujals; 4 Matt Simms; Running backs: 26 Tarean Folston; 24 Lawrence Pittman; 39 Brandon Radcliff; 25 Denard Robinson; Wide receivers: 13 Montay Crockett; 14 Malachi Jones; 15 Seantavius Jones; 82 Ervin Philips; 17 James Quick; 10 Justin Thomas; Tight ends: 84 Bug Howard; 80 Charles Standberry; 83 Jake Sutherland; 89 Keith Towbridge	Offensive linemen: 63 Tony Adams G; 64 Freddie Burden C; 74 Parker Collins C; 79 Will Corbin T; 75 Chase Farris G; 65 Avery Gennesy T; 76 Tyshon Henderson G; 71 Jared Machorro T; 56 Isaiah Williams G; Defensive linemen: 94 Tavaris Barnes DE; 93 T. J. Barnes DT; 95 David Dean DT; 92 KeShun Freeman DE; 99 Bijhon Jackson DT; 91 J. T. Jones DE; 97 Antonio Simmons DE; 90 Tracy Sprinkle DT	Linebackers: 52 Khalil Bass OLB; 54 Dylan Donahue OLB; 51 Tau Lotulelei MLB; 50 Jeff Luc MLB; 55 Ed Shockley OLB; 58 Brandon Watts OLB; Defensive backs: 33 Donatello Brown CB; 21 Doran Grant CB; 30 Darius Hillary CB; 22 Dwayne Hollis CB; 23 Desmond Lawrence CB; 20 Carlos Merritt FS/SS; 31 Ed Reynolds FS; 29 Damian Swann CB; 28 Lou Young SS/FS; Special teams: 7 Younghoe Koo K; 9 Cameron Nizialek P; 44 Jeff Overbaugh LS	Reserve lists: 32 Tyson Graham SS (IR); -- Bronson Hill RB (IR); 87 Garrett Hudson TE (IR); 70 John Kling T (IR); 42 Quincy Mauger SS (IR); 60 Trae Moxley T (IR); 77 Brandon Pertile T (IR); -- Bentley Spain T (IR); 27 Akrum Wadley RB (IR); Rights list: Donnie Miles, Jr. S; 53 Active, 10 Inactive

=== Allocation pool ===
The Legends' assigned area, which designated player rights, included the following:

Colleges

- Albany State
- Clark Atlanta
- Clemson
- Fort Valley State
- Georgia
- Georgia Southern
- Georgia State
- Georgia Tech
- Kennesaw State
- Louisville
- Mercer
- Morehouse
- North Carolina
- Savannah State
- Shorter
- Valdosta State
- Virginia
- Virginia Tech
- West Georgia

National Football League (NFL)

- Atlanta Falcons
- Carolina Panthers
- Jacksonville Jaguars
- Washington Redskins

Canadian Football League (CFL)

- Toronto Argonauts

== Staff ==
Atlanta Legends staff
Front office: General manager – Billy Devaney; Head coaches: Head coach – Kevin Coyle; Offensive coaches: Offensive coordinator/quarterbacks – Ken Zampese; Running backs – John Johnson; Tight ends – Corey Woods; Offensive line – Pete Metzelaars; Offensive assistant – Miles Robinson; Defensive coaches: Defensive coordinator – Louie Cioffi; Defensive line – Leroy Thompson; Linebackers/Defensive specialist – Jennifer Welter; Defensive assistant – Tyler Anderson; Special teams coordinator/linebackers coach – Mark Criner	Sports Medicine staff: Head athletic trainer – Rachel Sharpe; Assistant athletic trainer – Daniel McAdams; Physical therapist – Mike Thomas; Equipment staff: Head equipment manager – Cortez Robinson; Assistant equipment manager – Jae Gladden; Video staff: Video director – Jacob Berry; Assistant video director – Rickey Layman; → Coaching Staff

== 2019 season ==
2019 Atlanta Legends season
- General manager: Billy Devaney
- Head coach: Kevin Coyle
- Home stadium: Georgia State Stadium

Results
- Record: 2–6
- League place: 3rd (tie), Eastern Conference

=== Final standings ===
2019 Alliance of American Football standings
Eastern Conference
Club	W–L	PCT	CONF	PF	PA	DIFF	SOS	SOV	STK
(x) – Orlando Apollos	7–1	.875	5–0	236	136	100	.406	.375	W2
(x) – Birmingham Iron	5–3	.625	3–2	165	133	32	.406	.300	W1
(e) – Memphis Express	2–6	.250	1–4	152	194	-42	.578	.500	L1
(e) – Atlanta Legends	2–6	.250	1–4	88	213	-125	.609	.438	L3
Western Conference
Club	W–L	PCT	CONF	PF	PA	DIFF	SOS	SOV	STK
San Antonio Commanders	5–3	.625	3–2	158	154	4	.516	.450	L1
Arizona Hotshots	5–3	.625	3–2	186	144	42	.469	.500	W3
San Diego Fleet	3–5	.375	2–3	158	161	-3	.469	.417	L3
Salt Lake Stallions	3–5	.375	2–3	135	143	-8	.547	.417	W1
(x)–clinched playoff berth; (e)–eliminated from playoff contention

=== Schedule ===
==== Preseason ====
Week	Date	Opponent	Result	Record	Venue
–	January 28	at San Antonio Commanders	L 11–37	0–1	Alamodome

==== Regular season ====
Week	Date	Opponent	Result	Record	Venue
1	February 9	at Orlando Apollos	L 6–40	0–1	Spectrum Stadium
2	February 17	at San Diego Fleet	L 12–24	0–2	SDCCU Stadium
3	February 24	Birmingham Iron	L 12–28	0–3	Georgia State Stadium
4	March 3	at Arizona Hotshots	W 14–11	1–3	Sun Devil Stadium
5	March 10	Memphis Express	W 23–20	2–3	Georgia State Stadium
6	March 17	San Antonio Commanders	L 6–37	2–4	Georgia State Stadium
7	March 23	Orlando Apollos	L 6–36	2–5	Georgia State Stadium
8	March 31	at Birmingham Iron	L 9–17	2–6	Legion Field
9	April 7	Salt Lake Stallions	Not played		Georgia State Stadium
10	April 13	at Memphis Express	Not played		Liberty Bowl Memorial Stadium

=== Game summaries ===
==== Week 1: at Orlando ====
Week One: Atlanta Legends at Orlando Apollos – Game summary

Quarter	1	2	3	4	Total
Legends	3	3	0	0	6
Apollos	0	22	3	15	40

at Spectrum Stadium, Orlando, Florida

- Date: February 9
- Game time: 8:00 p.m. ET
- Game attendance: 20,191
- Referee: John O'Neill
- TV announcers (CBS): Andrew Catalon, Gary Danielson, and Melanie Collins
- NoExtraPoints AAF

Game information

First Quarter

- (6:10) ATL – Younghoe Koo 38-yard field goal, Legends 3–0

Second Quarter

- (14:14) ORL – Jalin Marshall 26-yard pass from Garrett Gilbert (De'Veon Smith run), Apollos 8–3
- (11:55) ORL – De'Veon Smith 1-yard run (Garrett Gilbert pass to Matt Weiser), Apollos 16–3
- (7:20) ATL – Younghoe Koo 27-yard field goal, Apollos 16–6
- (0:06) ORL – Garrett Gilbert 5-yard pass from Jalin Marshall (pass failed), Apollos 22–6

Third Quarter

- (3:22) ORL – Elliott Fry 33-yard field goal, Apollos 25–6

Fourth Quarter

- (13:25) ORL – D'Ernest Johnson 33-yard pass from Garrett Gilbert (run failed), Apollos 31–6
- (11:07) ORL – Terence Garvin 51-yard interception return (pass failed), Apollos 37–6
- (2:53) ORL – Elliott Fry 21-yard field goal, Apollos 40–6

Top Passers

- ATL – Matt Simms – 15/28, 126 yards, 2 INT
- ORL – Garrett Gilbert – 15/25, 227 yards, 2 TD

Top Rushers

- ATL – Tarean Folston – 12 carries, 32 yards
- ORL – Akeem Hunt – 10 carries, 73 yards

Top Receivers

- ATL – Seantavius Jones – 3 receptions, 43 yards
- ORL – Charles Johnson – 4 receptions, 60 yards

Top Tackler

- ATL – Tyson Graham, 6 tackles
- ORL – Terence Garvin, 8 tackles

==== Week 2: at San Diego ====
Week Two: Atlanta Legends at San Diego Fleet – Game summary

Quarter	1	2	3	4	Total
Legends	9	0	0	3	12
Fleet	0	6	3	15	24

at SDCCU Stadium, San Diego, California

- Date: February 17
- Game time: 8:00 p.m. ET
- Game attendance: 20,019
- Referee: Brandon Cruse
- TV announcers (NFL Network): Andrew Siciliano, Marvin Lewis, Maurice Jones-Drew
- NoExtraPoints AAF

Game information

First Quarter

- (7:17) ATL – Younghoe Koo 29-yard field goal, Legends 3–0
- (3:21) ATL – Matt Simms 19-yard pass to Malachi Jones (pass failed), Legends 9–0

Second Quarter

- (1:39) SD – Donny Hageman 46-yard field goal, Legends 9–3
- (0:08) SD – Donny Hageman 43-yard field goal, Legends 9–6

Third Quarter

- (12:10) SD – Donny Hageman 26-yard field goal, Legends 9–9

Fourth Quarter

- (14:54) ATL – Younghoe Koo 26-yard field goal, Legends 12–9
- (9:04) SD – Ja'Quan Gardner 8-yard rush (pass failed), Fleet 15–12
- (4:00) SD – Ja'Quan Gardner 7-yard rush (rush failed), Fleet 21–12
- (0:35) SD – Donny Hageman 33-yard field goal, Fleet 24–12

Top Passers

- ATL – Matt Simms – 17/25, 160 yards, 1 TD, 1 INT
- SD – Philip Nelson – 14/30, 142 yards, 1 INT

Top Rushers

- ATL – Lawrence Pittman – 9 carries, 42 yards
- SD – Ja'Quan Gardner – 15 carries, 104 yards, 2 TD

Top Receivers

- ATL – Akrum Wadley – 8 receptions, 70 yards
- SD – Nelson Spruce – 4 receptions, 58 yards

==== Week 3: Birmingham ====
Week Three: Birmingham Iron at Atlanta Legends – Game summary

Quarter	1	2	3	4	Total
Iron	0	9	11	8	28
Legends	0	6	0	6	12

at Georgia State Stadium, Atlanta, Georgia

- Date: February 24
- Game time: 4:00 p.m. ET
- Game attendance: 10,717
- Referee: Reggie Smith
- TV announcers (CBS Sports Network): Ben Holden, Adam Archuleta, and John Schriffen
- NoExtraPoints AAF

Game information

First Quarter
No scoring plays
Second Quarter

- (14:08) ATL – Younghoe Koo 21-yard field goal, Legends 3–0
- (10:26) BIRM – Nick Novak 39-yard field goal, Tied 3–3
- (2:36) BIRM – Trent Richardson 5-yard rush (pass failed), Iron 9–3
- (1:06) ATL – Younghoe Koo 35-yard field goal, Iron 9–6

Third Quarter

- (8:20) BIRM – Nick Novak 27-yard field goal, Iron 12–6
- (0:05) BIRM – Luis Perez 2-yard pass to Trent Richardson (Luis Perez pass to Trent Richardson), Iron 20–6

Fourth Quarter

- (4:28) BIRM – Trent Richardson 6-yard rush (Luis Perez pass to L'Damian Washington), Iron 28–6
- (1:41) ATL – Matt Simms 23-yard pass to Montay Crockett (pass failed), Iron 28–12

Top Passers

- BIRM – Luis Perez – 17/31, 160 yards, 1 INT
- ATL – Matt Simms – 28/48, 328 yards, 1 TD, 3 INT

Top Rushers

- BIRM – Trent Richardson – 17 carries, 46 yards, 3 TD
- ATL – Matt Simms – 2 carries, 27 yards

Top Receivers

- BIRM – Quinton Patton – 4 receptions, 58 yards
- ATL – Seantavius Jones – 4 receptions, 72 yards

==== Week 4: at Arizona ====
Week Four: Atlanta Legends at Arizona Hotshots – Game summary

Quarter	1	2	3	4	Total
Legends	2	6	0	6	14
Hotshots	0	3	0	8	11

at Sun Devil Stadium, Tempe, Arizona

- Date: March 3
- Game time: 8:00 p.m. ET
- Game weather: Partly cloudy • Temperature: 74 °F (23 °C) • Wind: 5–10 mph
- Referee: Jeff Heaser
- TV announcers (NFL Network): Andrew Siciliano, Marvin Lewis, Shaun O'Hara
- NoExtraPoints AAF

Game information

First Quarter

- (0:26) ATL – Rashad Ross tackled in end zone by Ed Reynolds for a safety, Legends 2–0

Second Quarter

- (1:49) ATL – Denard Robinson 9-yard rush (pass failed), Legends 8–0
- (0:00) ARIZ – Nick Folk 39-yard field goal, Legends 8–3

Third Quarter
No scoring plays
Fourth Quarter

- (13:34) ATL – Younghoe Koo 27-yard field goal, Legends 11–3
- (5:20) ARIZ – John Wolford 20-yard pass to Rashad Ross (John Wolford pass to Marquis Bundy), Tied 11–11
- (1:03) ATL – Younghoe Koo 33-yard field goal, Legends 14–11

Top Passers

- ATL – Aaron Murray – 20/33, 254 yards
- ARIZ – John Wolford – 17/31, 185 yards, 1 TD

Top Rushers

- ATL – Aaron Murray – 7 carries, 54 yards
- ARIZ – Jhurell Pressley – 14 carries, 110 yards

Top Receivers

- ATL – Tarean Folston – 5 receptions, 66 yards
- ARIZ – Rashad Ross – 4 receptions, 74 yards, 1 TD

==== Week 5: Memphis ====
Week Five: Memphis Express at Atlanta Legends – Game summary

Quarter	1	2	3	4	Total
Express	6	6	8	0	20
Legends	3	11	0	9	23

at Georgia State Stadium, Atlanta, Georgia

- Date: March 10
- Game time: 4:00 p.m. ET
- Game attendance: 10,829
- Referee: Tra Blake
- TV announcers (CBS Sports Network): Ben Holden, Adam Archuleta, John Schriffen
- NoExtraPoints AAF

Game information

First Quarter

- (7:33) ATL – Younghoe Koo 38-yard field goal, Legends 3–0
- (4:55) MEM – Zac Stacy 7-yard rush (pass failed), Express 6–3

Second Quarter

- (13:25) ATL – Tarean Folston 2-yard rush (Aaron Murray pass to Justin Thomas), Legends 11–6
- (9:18) MEM – Zac Stacy 3-yard rush (pass failed), Express 12–11
- (0:00) ATL – Younghoe Koo 25-yard field goal, Legends 14–12

Third Quarter

- (3:39) MEM – Zach Mettenberger 1-yard rush (Terrence Magee rush), Express 20–14

Fourth Quarter

- (11:50) ATL – Aaron Murray 2-yard pass to Tarean Folston (pass failed), Tied 20–20
- (0:09) ATL – Younghoe Koo 35-yard field goal, Legends 23–20

Top Passers

- MEM – Zach Mettenberger – 9/17, 181 yards, 1 INT
- ATL – Aaron Murray – 27/43, 306 yards, 1 TD

Top Rushers

- MEM – Zac Stacy – 13 carries, 41 yards, 2 TD
- ATL – Tarean Folston – 11 carries, 83 yards, 1 TD

Top Receivers

- MEM – Sherman Badie – 1 reception, 56 yards
- ATL – Seantavius Jones – 5 receptions, 89 yards

==== Week 6: San Antonio ====
Week Six: San Antonio Commanders at Atlanta Legends – Game summary

Quarter	1	2	3	4	Total
Commanders	6	20	3	8	37
Legends	0	6	0	0	6

at Georgia State Stadium, Atlanta, Georgia

- Date: March 17
- Game time: 4:00 p.m. ET
- Game attendance: 10,619
- Referee: James Carter
- TV announcers (CBS Sports Network): Ben Holden, Adam Archuleta and John Schriffen
- NoExtraPoints AAF

Game information

First Quarter

- (7:38) SA – Kenneth Farrow 13-yard rush (pass failed), Commanders 6–0

Second Quarter

- (13:35) SA – Logan Woodside 5-yard pass to Mekale McKay (Logan Woodside pass to Mekale McKay), Commanders 14–0
- (9:55) SA – Logan Woodside 33-yard pass to Evan Rodriguez (pass failed), Commanders 20–0
- (2:37) ATL – Aaron Murray 1-yard pass to Tarean Folston (pass failed), Commanders 20–6
- (1:00) SA – Greg Ward Jr. 79-yard punt return (pass failed), Commanders 26–6

Third Quarter

- (8:39) SA – Nick Rose 23-yard field goal, Commanders 29–6

Fourth Quarter

- (8:40) SA – Derron Smith 87-yard interception return (Kenneth Farrow rush), Commanders 37–6

Top Passers

- SA – Logan Woodside – 17/23, 164 yards, 2 TD
- ATL – Aaron Murray – 30/41, 215 yards, 1 TD, 3 INT

Top Rushers

- SA – Kenneth Farrow – 9 carries, 35 yards, 1 TD
- ATL – Brandon Radcliff – 6 carries, 24 yards

Top Receivers

- SA – Cam Clear – 5 receptions, 45 yards
- ATL – Keith Towbridge – 5 receptions, 42 yards

==== Week 7: Orlando ====
Week Seven: Orlando Apollos at Atlanta Legends – Game summary

Quarter	1	2	3	4	Total
Apollos	8	6	14	8	36
Legends	0	6	0	0	6

at Georgia State Stadium, Atlanta, Georgia

- Date: March 23
- Game time: 2:00 p.m. ET
- Game attendance: 11,416
- Referee: Brandon Cruse
- TV announcers (TNT): Mark Malone, Marvin Lewis
- NoExtraPoints AAF

Game information

First Quarter

- (8:18) ORL – De'Veon Smith 1-yard rush (De'Veon Smith rush), Apollos 8–0

Second Quarter

- (14:54) ATL – Aaron Murray 8-yard pass to Malachi Jones (rush failed), Apollos 8–6
- (6:31) ORL – De'Veon Smith 1-yard rush (pass failed), Apollos 14–6

Third Quarter

- (10:33) ORL – De'Veon Smith 4-yard rush (pass failed), Apollos 20–6
- (6:54) ORL – Deji Olatoye 65-yard interception return (Garrett Gilbert rush), Apollos 28–6

Fourth Quarter

- (9:57) ORL – Garrett Gilbert 7-yard pass to Charles Johnson (D'Ernest Johnson rush), Apollos 36–6

Top Passers

- ATL – Aaron Murray – 16/22, 135 yards, 1 TD, 2 INT
- ORL – Garrett Gilbert – 19/23, 217 yards, 1 TD

Top Rushers

- ATL – Tarean Folston – 8 carries, 37 yards
- ORL – D'Ernest Johnson – 7 receptions, 54 yards

Top Receivers

- ATL – Malachi Jones – 6 receptions, 53 yards, 1 TD
- ORL – Rannell Hall – 2 receptions, 60 yards

==== Week 8: at Birmingham ====
Week Eight: Atlanta Legends at Birmingham Iron – Game summary

Quarter	1	2	3	4	Total
Legends	3	3	3	0	9
Iron	0	11	3	3	17

at Legion Field, Birmingham, Alabama

- Date: March 31
- Game time: 4:00 p.m. ET
- Game attendance: 17,328
- Referee: Jeff Heaser
- TV announcers (CBS Sports Network): Rich Waltz, Adam Archuleta and Melanie Collins
- NoExtraPoints AAF

Game information

First Quarter

- (1:39) ATL – Younghoe Koo 33-yard field goal, Legends 3–0

Second Quarter

- (14:51) BIRM – Nick Novak 35-yard field goal, Tied 3–3
- (8:13) BIRM – Trent Richardson 2-yard rush (Luis Perez pass to Quinton Patton), Iron 11–3
- (2:13) ATL – Younghoe Koo 31-yard field goal, Iron 11–6

Third Quarter

- (12:46) BIRM – Nick Novak 37-yard field goal, Iron 14–6
- (9:01) ATL – Younghoe Koo 35-yard field goal, Iron 14–9

Fourth Quarter

- (10:14) BIRM – Nick Novak 28-yard field goal, Iron 17–9

Top Passers

- ATL – Matt Simms – 13/22, 135 yards, 1 INT
- BIRM – Luis Perez – 10/24, 65 yards

Top Rushers

- ATL – Brandon Radcliff – 6 carries, 30 yards
- BIRM – Trent Richardson – 18 carries, 83 yards, 1 TD

Top Receivers

- ATL – Justin Thomas – 4 receptions, 74 yards
- BIRM – Wes Saxton – 3 receptions, 36 yards

== Media ==
In addition to league-wide television coverage through NFL Network, CBS Sports Network, TNT, and B/R Live, Legends' games were also broadcast on local radio by WCNN ("680 The Fan").
