= Ken Zampese =

American football coach (born 1967)

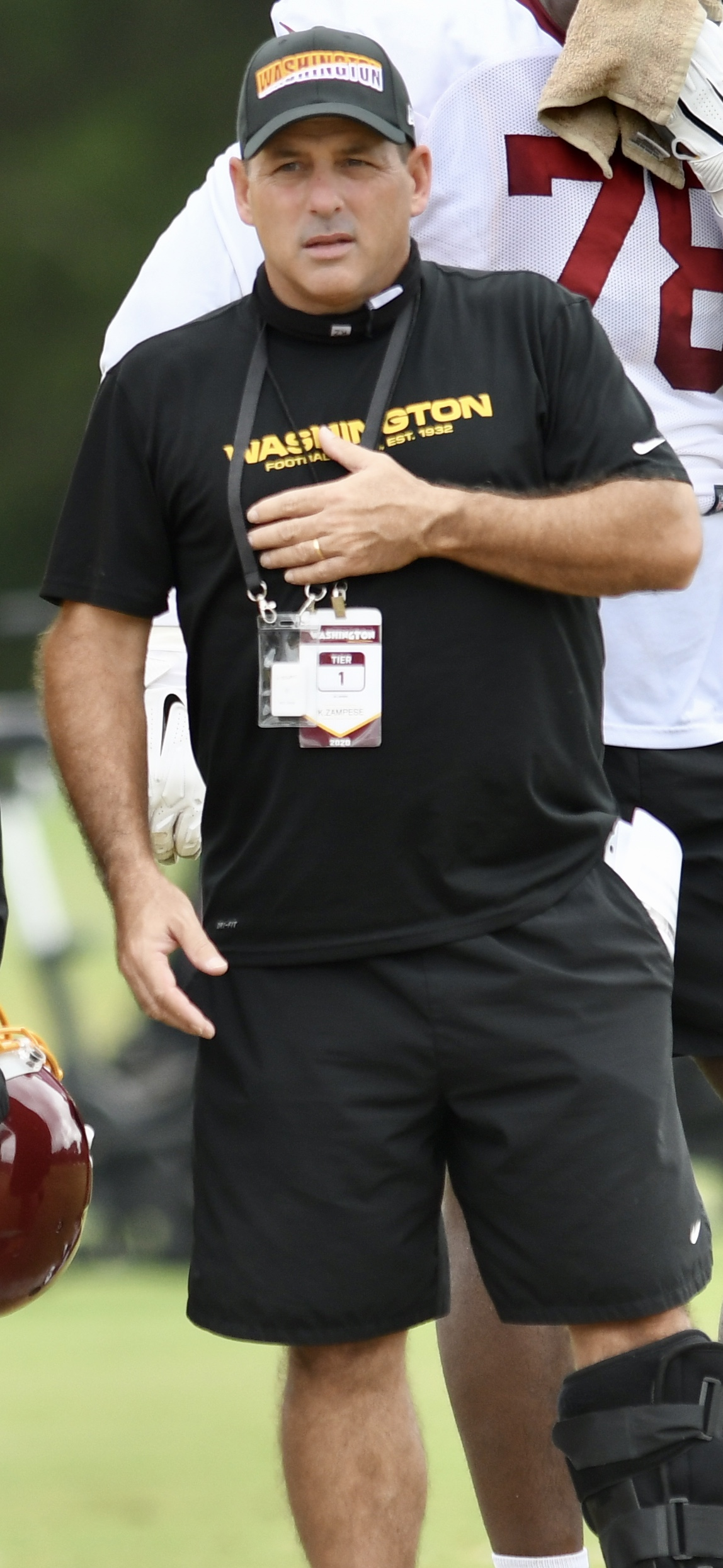
- Zampese with the Washington Football Team in 2020

Tampa Bay Buccaneers
- Title: Senior offensive assistant, Pass game specialist

Personal information
- Born: July 19, 1967 (age 59); Santa Monica, California, U.S.

Career information
- Positions: Wide receiver, Return specialist
- High school: San Diego (CA) University
- College: San Diego (1985-1988)

Career history
- USC (1990–1991) Graduate assistant; Northern Arizona (1992–1995); Wide receivers coach (1992–1994); Offensive coordinator (1995); Miami (OH) (1996–1997) Quarterbacks coach & passing game coordinator; Philadelphia Eagles (1998) Offensive assistant; Green Bay Packers (1999) Offensive assistant & offensive quality control coach; St. Louis Rams (2000–2002); Offensive assistant (2000); Wide receivers coach (2001); Wide receivers coach & passing game coordinator (2002); Cincinnati Bengals (2003–2017); Quarterbacks coach (2003–2015); Offensive coordinator (2016–2017); Cleveland Browns (2018) Quarterbacks coach; Atlanta Legends (2019) Offensive coordinator & quarterbacks coach; Florida (2019) Quality control analyst; Washington Football Team / Commanders (2020–2023); Quarterbacks coach (2020–2022); Senior offensive advisor / game management (2023); Atlanta Falcons (2024–2025) Senior offensive assistant; Tampa Bay Buccaneers (2026–present) Senior offensive assistant/pass game specialist
- Coaching profile at Pro Football Reference

Kenneth Zampese (born July 19, 1967) is an American professional football coach who currently serves as a senior offensive assistant and pass game specialist for the Tampa Bay Buccaneers of the National Football League (NFL). Zampese began his coaching career at the University of San Diego, his alma mater, and has held a variety of college and NFL coaching positions. He is the son of former NFL coach Ernie Zampese.

== Family background ==
Zampese's father, Ernie Zampese, spent 36 years as a coach in the NFL with the New York Jets, San Diego Chargers, Dallas Cowboys, New England Patriots, Washington Redskins, and both the Los Angeles Rams and St. Louis Rams. Ernie Zampese is known best for his role on the Chargers' offensive coaching staff in the 1970s and 1980s, when he helped engineer the famed Air Coryell offense. The offense is still considered one of the best passing offenses in NFL history—featured Hall of Famers Dan Fouts, Charlie Joiner and Kellen Winslow, along with John Jefferson and Wes Chandler. These dynamic players operated in a scheme that led the league in passing yards an NFL-record six consecutive seasons (1978–1983).

Zampese attended the University of San Diego from 1985 to 1988, where he played on the football team as a wide receiver, kick returner and punt returner. He was also a member of the Sigma Pi fraternity.

== Career ==
=== Early coaching ===
Zampese began his NFL coaching career in 1998 as an offensive assistant with the Philadelphia Eagles under head coach Ray Rhodes. In 1999, Rhodes became head coach of the Green Bay Packers, and Zampese followed. He again worked as offensive assistant, mentored by quarterbacks coach Mike McCarthy. Packer quarterbacks of that era were Brett Favre, Matt Hasselbeck and Aaron Brooks.

=== St. Louis Rams ===
Zampese joined the St. Louis Rams in 2000 as an offensive assistant under head coach Mike Martz. He was promoted the following season to WRs coach, and again the next season to WRs coach/passing game coordinator. During his stint in St. Louis, Zampese assisted Martz with the passing game of what became known as "The Greatest Show on Turf" – a nickname for the Rams' high-powered, record-setting offense. It was here that he gained additional exposure to the "3-Digit" passing system, pioneered by his father and expanded to new heights under Martz.

Quarterback Kurt Warner (and backups Trent Green and Marc Bulger), Hall of Fame RB Marshall Faulk, and WRs Isaac Bruce, Torry Holt, Az-Zahir Hakim and Ricky Proehl made up what is widely considered the most prolific offense in NFL history.

Although "The Greatest Show on Turf" began its record-setting run a year prior to Zampese's arrival in St. Louis – the 1999 Super Bowl XXXIV Rams' Super Bowl championship season – it lasted three seasons (1999–2001), and he was with the Rams for the final two seasons of the run (2000–01).

=== Cincinnati Bengals ===
Zampese joined the Cincinnati Bengals in 2003 as quarterbacks coach at a time when the team was searching for a quarterback to lead the franchise. He aided in the scouting and evaluation of the quarterbacks in the 2003 NFL draft, as the team used its No. 1 overall pick to select 2002 Heisman Trophy-winning quarterback Carson Palmer of Southern California. On September 15, 2017, Zampese was fired by the Bengals after the team started the season 0–2 and did not score a single touchdown.

=== Cleveland Browns ===
On January 12, 2018, Zampese was hired by the Cleveland Browns as quarterbacks coach, reuniting him with Browns head coach and former Bengals offensive coordinator Hue Jackson. After the 2018 season, during which Jackson was fired, he was not retained by new head coach Freddie Kitchens.

=== Atlanta Legends ===
In the 2019 AAF season, the Atlanta Legends were plagued by various offensive coaching resignations, including head coach Brad Childress and offensive coordinator Michael Vick before the season, and quarterbacks coach/play caller Richard Bartel after three games. Zampese was hired by the Legends starting with the fourth game against the Arizona Hotshots.

=== Washington Football Team / Commanders ===
In 2020, Zampese joined the Washington Football Team as their quarterbacks coach. In 2023, Zampese was given a senior offensive advisor/game management role. He was not retained following the firing of Ron Rivera and hiring of new head coach Dan Quinn.

=== Atlanta Falcons ===
Zampese was hired as a senior offensive assistant for the Atlanta Falcons in 2024.

=== Tampa Bay Buccaneers ===
On February 2, 2026, the Tampa Bay Buccaneers hired Zampese to serve as a senior offensive assistant under head coach Todd Bowles.
