= Ernie Zampese =

American football player and coach (1936–2022)

Personal information
- Born: March 12, 1936; Santa Barbara, California, U.S.
- Died: August 29, 2022 (aged 86)

Career information
- Position: Halfback
- High school: Santa Barbara
- College: USC (1955–1956)

Career history

Coaching
- Hancock (1962–1965); Backfield coach (1962–1963); Head coach (1964–1965); Cal Poly (1966) Backfield coach; San Diego State (1967–1975) Defensive backs coach; San Diego Chargers (1976, 1979–1986); Defensive backs coach (1976); Wide receivers coach (1979–1982); Assistant head coach (1983–1985); Offensive coordinator (1986); Los Angeles Rams (1987–1993) Offensive coordinator; Dallas Cowboys (1994–1997) Offensive coordinator; New England Patriots (1998–1999) Offensive coordinator; Dallas Cowboys (2000–2001) Offensive consultant; St. Louis Rams (2002) Offensive consultant; Washington Redskins (2004) Offensive consultant

Operations
- New York Jets (1977–1978) Scout

Awards and highlights
- Super Bowl champion (XXX)

Head coaching record
- Career: Junior college: 9–8 (.529)

Ernest Eugene Zampese (March 12, 1936 – August 29, 2022) was an American professional football coach in the National Football League (NFL). Playing for Santa Barbara High School, he was selected as the CIF Player of the Year in 1953 and went on to play at the halfback position for the USC Trojans in 1955 and 1956. Between 1962 and 1975, he was a college football coach at Allan Hancock Junior College (1962–1965), Cal Poly San Luis Obispo (1966), and San Diego State University (1967–1975).

Between 1976 and 1999, Zampese served as an assistant coach and offensive coordinator for various National Football League teams. He gained his greatest acclaim as the assistant head coach and offensive coordinator of the San Diego Chargers under head coach Don Coryell. He was the father of NFL coach Ken Zampese.

== Playing career ==
=== Santa Barbara High School ===
Despite his small size (5 feet, 8 inches and 155 pounds), Zampese played tailback for Santa Barbara High School from 1951 to 1953. As a senior in 1953, Zampese rushed for 869 yards (9.3 yards per carry) and 19 touchdowns. He also passed for 1008 yards and 14 passing touchdowns. In December 1953, he was selected by the Helms Athletic Foundation's football board as the CIF Player of the Year. The Los Angeles Times called him "Little Ernie Zampese, a durable workhorse who did everything well for the Santa Barbara High Dons." Zampese later recalled his days playing for the Dons as follows:

We had a great tradition at Santa Barbara. The stadium was on the school grounds in a little bowl. The town was much smaller then and everyone watched the Santa Barbara Dons on Friday nights. The epitomy [sic] of success was to play for the Santa Barbara Dons. That was as high as you could go.

=== USC ===
After graduating from high school, Zampese enrolled at the University of Southern California. He played left halfback for the USC Trojans football team from 1955 to 1956. Zampese developed a reputation as a colorful character at USC. In a 1987 feature story, the Los Angeles Times wrote of Zampese in his college days, "Zampese was a work of art, or so the legend goes, a guy who could paint the town Trojan Red at night and be seen whistling at sunrise the next morning, a Daily Racing Form folded under his arm, a soda in one hand and a cigarette in the other. Let's just say he wasn't headed for biology class." He had his best season for the Trojans as a junior in 1956. In the Trojans' final pre-season game in September 1956, Zampese scored two rushing touchdowns and returned a punt 66 yards. Zampese's performance led sports writer Braven Dyer to write, "A lightweight named Ernie Zampese stole the show... Weighing less than the 160 pounds credited to him on Troy's roster, the slick Santa Barbara speedster sparked the so-called second varsity unit ..." In addition to playing halfback, Zampese was also the punter for the 1956 Trojans team and was among the national leaders with an average of 43.9 yards per punt. He set the USC record for longest punt, 85 yards against Wisconsin.

In his final college football game, Zampese ran 38 yards for a touchdown in the fourth quarter to give the Trojans a 28–20 win over Notre Dame at the Los Angeles Memorial Coliseum. The Los Angeles Times concluded its coverage of the game with a tribute to Zampese, "Troy had the final word, though, and came up with the clutch play on Zampese's 38-yard run 46 seconds into the final period. Clutch? You bet! It was fourth and 1 on the Notre Dame 38 when Ernie decided to be a hero."

Zampese was barred from competition in 1957 due to Pacific Coast Conference penalties against USC. Zampese and other players had part-time jobs which were determined to be in violation of NCAA rules. Zampese later recalled that the part-time job that cost him his eligibility as a senior was sweeping leaves for $1.50 an hour. Zampese later recalled, "We did that to get extra money because you could hardly survive on what the Pacific Coast Conference allowed for scholarships. I had to report to a groundskeeper and do whatever he did."

Having been ruled ineligible for the 1957 season, Zampese did not complete his degree at USC. He later recalled having academic problems in his senior year: "The thing that happened my last semester was that I never went to class. I took Incompletes and they turned to F's, and I blew the whole thing off. At that time, I wasn't real interested and I had no direction, other than having fun."

=== Ottawa Rough Riders ===
In June 1958, Zampese signed a contract to play professional football for the Ottawa Rough Riders in the Canadian Football League, reportedly for $9,000. He was cut by the Rough Riders in August 1958.

== Coaching career ==
=== Hancock and Cal Poly ===
After being cut by the Rough Riders in the summer of 1958, Zampese came back to California and took a job driving a sugar beet truck in Bakersfield. He then took a job as a postman in Santa Barbara, where he was married to his wife, Joyce. He later recalled that Joyce straightened him out and urged him to return to college so that he could pursue his dream of becoming a football coach. Zampese enrolled at California Polytechnic State College in San Luis Obispo and earned a degree in physical education. He recalled, "For the first time, I sat down and really did the work. I was really proud of myself. The first year I ended up with a 3.0 average and, boy, that was big stuff."

Zampese got his start in coaching in 1962 when he was hired by John Madden as the backfield coach at Allan Hancock Junior College in Santa Maria, California. Zampese became the head coach at Hancock in 1964 after Madden left to join Don Coryell's coaching staff at San Diego State University. The brief stint as head coach of the Bulldogs proved to be Zampese's only head coaching experience. Zampese later noted, "I did it once, and I wasn't good at it. Why? I don't know. I don't like to be the out-front guy. I'm not comfortable in that position."

In 1966, Zampese returned to Cal Poly, this time as the Mustangs' backfield coach.

=== San Diego State ===
In June 1967, he was hired by San Diego State head coach Don Coryell as his defensive backfield coach; Zampese replaced Madden, who resigned to join the Oakland Raiders staff. He remained an assistant coach at San Diego State from 1967 to 1975 and was one of two assistant coaches to retain his job after Coryell resigned in 1973 to join the St. Louis Cardinals. Zampese recalled that his years as an assistant coach at San Diego State was his first exposure to a great passing attack.

=== San Diego Chargers ===
He began his NFL coaching career in 1976 as the defensive backs coach for head coach Tommy Prothro of the San Diego Chargers. He spent the 1977 and 1978 seasons as a scout for the New York Jets.

In March 1979, Zampese returned to the Chargers where he was reunited with Don Coryell. He coached the wide receivers, including Hall of Famers Charlie Joiner and Kellen Winslow, from 1979 to 1983. In 1981, the Los Angeles Times published a feature story giving the little-known Zampese much of the credit for the famed Air Coryell offense of the late 1970s and early 1980s. The Times feature appeared under the headline, "Zampese Puts Air in Coryell Attack", and portrayed Zampese as a behind-the-scenes strategist sitting in a cubbyhole and speaking in an incomprehensible jargon. Zampese explained his approach to the passing game as follows:

Everybody uses basically the same pass patterns. Philosophy varies in the formations you throw from. We have a lot of formations and movements. When you move like we do, you get constant movement from the defense. We have to do a lot of adjusting and reading on the move. ... There's no question our movement is confusing. Our movement can change the strength of a formation from strong left to strong right. We like to eliminate the pre-snap thought and anticipation by the defense. It's a game of matchups, and our formations are primarily predicated on certain matchups.

In 1983, Zampese was promoted to assistant head coach in charge of the passing game. In 1985, the Chargers shuffled assignments, with Zampese losing the title of assistant head coach and becoming offensive coordinator. The Los Angeles Times in December 1985 wrote the following about Zampese's new role:

Fortunately for morale, Zampese is not the type to worry about what he is called. For that matter, he probably did not even know that he was assistant head coach and undoubtedly does not care that he is now a mere offensive coordinator. If he knows. Zampese's only interest is in designing a high-octane offense. All he needs is a blackboard and a projector. He does not need a desk and he cares not what it says on the door. He could work in a cave on Mt. Laguna and be happy.

During Zampese's years with the Chargers, they consistently ranked among the top offensive teams in the NFL. The team ranked first in passing offense six times in seven years from 1979 to 1985 and ranked first or second in total offense four times during the same span. San Diego's 1982 average of 325.2 passing yards per game still ranks as the highest average for a single season in NFL history.

=== Los Angeles Rams ===
In February 1987, Zampese signed as offensive coordinator of the Los Angeles Rams. Rams head coach John Robinson had earlier been asked who he would most like to start a new coaching staff with, and without hesitation Robinson named Zampese. Zampese was described at the time as an "offensive genius" and "one of the most likable and most respected coaches in the league." Zampese spent seven years with the Rams from 1987 to 1993. He took an offense that was ranked 17th in the league before he arrived and turned it into the third best scoring offense in the NFL in 1988 and second best in 1989. His Rams' teams ranked among the top 7 in passing offense four straight years from 1988 to 1991.

=== Dallas Cowboys ===
From 1994 to 1997, he was the offensive coordinator for the Dallas Cowboys. In his first year in Dallas, the Cowboys' offense finished second in the NFL in scoring with an average of 25.9 points per game. The team finished 12–4 and advanced to the NFC championship game but lost to the San Francisco 49ers. In 1995, the Cowboys won the Super Bowl and averaged 27.2 points per game—third best in the NFL. During the 1996 and 1997 seasons, the Cowboys' offense dropped to 25th and 22nd best in the NFL.

=== New England Patriots ===
In January 1998, Zampese signed as offensive coordinator with the New England Patriots. He held the position for the 1998 and 1999 seasons. In Zampese's first year with New England, the Patriots averaged 21.1 points per game, 11th best in the NFL. In 1999, the Patriots' offensive output dropped to 18.7 points per game, 20th in the NFL.

== Personal life ==
Zampese was the father of Ken Zampese, quarterbacks coach for Washington Commanders since 2020.

Zampese died at the age of 86 on August 29, 2022.

== Head coaching record ==
Year	Team	Overall	Conference	Standing	Bowl/playoffs
Hancock Bulldogs (Central California Junior College Association) (1964–1965)
1964	Hancock	4–5	3–2	3rd	
1965	Hancock	5–3	4–2	T–2nd	
Reedley:		9–8	7–4		
Total:		9–8			
