= Alliance of American Football =

Former professional American football league

- Most recent season or competition: 2019 AAF season
- Classification: High-level minor league
- Sport: American football
- Founded: March 20, 2018
- First season: 2019
- Folded: April 17, 2019 (bankruptcy)
- No. of teams: 8
- Country: United States
- Headquarters: San Francisco, California
- Broadcasters: United States: CBS/CBS Sports Network/NFL Network/TNT
- Website: AAF.com

The Alliance of American Football (AAF) was a professional American football minor league. The AAF consisted of eight centrally owned and operated teams in the southern and western United States, seven of which were located in metropolitan areas with at least one major professional sports franchise. It positioned itself as an "upper-level minor league" serving as a transition between the college game and the NFL.

Founded by Charlie Ebersol and Bill Polian in 2018, the AAF began play on February 9, 2019. The league was scheduled to have a 10-week regular season and conclude with a championship game on April 27. After eight weeks of play, however, the league's football operations were suspended by controlling owner Thomas Dundon on April 2. Two days later, the AAF allowed players to leave their contracts to sign with NFL teams. The AAF filed for Chapter 7 bankruptcy on April 17, 2019, with the league's sole season left incomplete.

== History ==
Charlie Ebersol, son of former NBC executive and XFL co-founder Dick Ebersol, was inspired to create the AAF in late 2016 after producing the documentary This Was the XFL for ESPN Films' 30 for 30 series; upon researching and examining the history of the XFL, he came to the conclusion that the concept was viable but that the finished product was both poorly executed and, from an on-field standpoint, bad football. He began developing the AAF in February 2017, about the same time that word had come out about XFL co-founder Vince McMahon possibly reviving the old XFL brand (which McMahon would indeed do in 2020). Exhibits in a lawsuit filed by Robert Vanech, who claimed to have co-founded the AAF, state that Ebersol had originally approached McMahon about relaunching the XFL but was unable to come to an agreement, as Ebersol wanted control of the XFL brand and was willing to pay $50 million for the trademark, which McMahon was unwilling to sell. In December 2018, two months before the AAF season began, Charlie Ebersol asked Vince McMahon about merging the AAF with the XFL. McMahon turned him down.

The league was formally organized on February 6, 2018, as an interlocked web of five Delaware limited liability companies: Legendary Field Exhibitions, AAF Players, AAF Properties, LFE 2, and We Are Realtime, LLC. Each in turn was controlled by Ebersol through his own entity as manager, Ebersol Sports Media Group, Inc., while minority investors held stakes in one or more of the LLC entities.

The AAF was announced on March 20, 2018. Ebersol sought to focus on creating a solid football product in the hopes that it would attract fans. He hired a team of experienced football players, coaches and executives to prepare the league for launch. The AAF was overseen by former NFL general manager Bill Polian, former Pittsburgh Steelers safety Troy Polamalu, and executive J. K. McKay. Advisers also include former Steelers receiver Hines Ward, former New York Giants and Oakland Raiders defensive end Justin Tuck, retired referee and current Fox NFL rules analyst Mike Pereira, and Ebersol's father, Dick Ebersol.

Ebersol attended the first XFL game in Las Vegas in 2001, and remembered how disappointed his father was by the poor quality of play. To ensure professional-level football at launch, the AAF set out to hire coaches with professional football coaching and championship experience. On April 7, 2018, the first team, Orlando, was announced with its coach Steve Spurrier. By June 2018, the league had announced its eight inaugural teams and their cities.

On July 30, 2018, the Alliance announced the league had signed 100 players. In August 2018, the league held the Alliance Scouting Combine at three locations and four dates: August 4, 2018, in Los Angeles, California; August 18 in Houston, Texas; and August 25–26 in Atlanta, Georgia. By August 24, 2018, 205 players were signed. These dates provided an opportunity for players cut at the NFL roster deadline, and each player signed a non-guaranteed three-year contract worth a total of $250,000 ($70,000 in 2019; $80,000 in 2020; $100,000 in 2021), with performance-based and fan-interaction incentives allowing for players to earn more.

In July 2018, Starter, through G-III Sports, which manufactured NFL jerseys and apparel in the 1980s and 1990s, was named the official on-field apparel and game-day uniform supplier for the AAF, marking a return for the brand to professional football after an almost 20-year absence. On September 20, the league announced four eastern inaugural franchises' names and logos. The four western teams' logos and names were revealed five days later.

=== Inaugural season ===
On October 16, 2018, the Alliance announced its schedule (indicating the day and location, but not the time, of each game) which had two games each on Saturday and on Sunday most weekends. Quarterback skills training camps were held at the Alamodome in San Antonio on November 12 through 14. On November 27, the league held a four-round "Protect or Pick" quarterback draft in the Esports Arena at Luxor Las Vegas and broadcast on CBS Sports Network.

The AAF began its inaugural, 10-week season on February 9, 2019. The first points in AAF regular season history were scored by kicker Younghoe Koo of the Atlanta Legends, who made a 38-yard field goal against the Orlando Apollos. The first touchdown came in the same game with Orlando quarterback Garrett Gilbert connecting with Jalin Marshall for a 16-yard score. The first shutout was recorded by the Birmingham Iron when they defeated the Memphis Express, 26–0, in Week 1. The first onside conversion (see Rules section, below) was attempted during Week 3, with Atlanta successfully completing a 48-yard pass against Birmingham. The first safety was registered by Atlanta against the Arizona Hotshots in Week 4. The first overtime game occurred in Week 7, with Memphis defeating Birmingham.

A four-team playoff was to be capped with the league's championship game, initially scheduled to be held at Sam Boyd Stadium near Las Vegas. After Dundon took over league operations, he moved the game to the Ford Center at the Star in Frisco, Texas.

==== Cessation of operations ====
On April 2, 2019, the AAF suspended all football operations, on orders from AAF chairman Tom Dundon. League co-founder Bill Polian stated:

I am extremely disappointed to learn Tom Dundon has decided to suspend all football operations of the Alliance of American Football. When Mr. Dundon took over, it was the belief of my co-founder, Charlie Ebersol, and myself that we would finish the season, pay our creditors, and make the necessary adjustments to move forward in a manner that made economic sense for all. The momentum generated by our players, coaches and football staff had us well positioned for future success. Regrettably, we will not have that opportunity.

Players found out about the suspension through the Internet before their coaches confirmed the news. Players were evicted from the hotels where their teams were being housed—with some being personally charged for unpaid hotel bills—and required to pay their own way home; they also lost their health insurance and were forced to cover their own medical bills from injuries sustained during play. League employees were notified via an April 2 letter from the AAF board, which did not give a reason for ending the season, that their jobs were terminated as of April 3 with no severance. Ebersol and Dundon refused public comment; Ebersol would eventually speak out on April 17, stating that he had been advised not to speak by his attorneys. He insisted that the money he raised was there and had been vetted up until immediately before the season, claimed that reports of players being saddled with hotel and medical bills were either fake news or fraudulent charges, and could not ensure that all those owed money would be paid.

On April 4, the AAF announced through their official Twitter account that players were eligible to leave their contracts to sign with NFL teams. The contracts that players had originally signed included a stipulation that they could leave to sign with NFL teams at the conclusion of an AAF season. The league did not issue any public statement until April 6, when the AAF.com website was updated with a statement, which read in part:

This week, we made the difficult decision to suspend all football operations for the Alliance of American Football. We understand the difficulty that this decision has caused for many people and for that we are very sorry. This is not the way we wanted it to end, but we are also committed to working on solutions for all outstanding issues to the best of our ability. Due to ongoing legal processes, we are unable to comment further or share details about the decision.

At the time its football operations were suspended, the AAF had played eight weeks out of a scheduled ten-week regular season.

==== Bankruptcy liquidation ====
On April 17, Ebersol Sports Media Group, Inc. and the five AAF operating entities filed for joint Chapter 7 bankruptcy (liquidation) in Texas’ Eastern District. In the filing, the league claimed assets of $11.3 million, liabilities of $48.3 million, and approximately $536,000 in cash. The AAF counted its player contracts among its assets in the bankruptcy filing, blocking players from joining the Canadian Football League. This block was lifted a day after the bankruptcy filing.

The league's uniforms and equipment were stored in a lot in San Antonio, Texas and eventually auctioned off in July 2019. Former Arena Football League commissioner Jerry Kurz made the winning bid at $455,000, beating out bids from (among others) the revived XFL. Subsequently, the perpetually postponed Major League Football claimed it had entered into an agreement to purchase the equipment for $400,000.

== Teams ==
Team	City	Stadium	Capacity	Head coach
Eastern Conference
Atlanta Legends	Atlanta, Georgia	Georgia State Stadium	24,333	Kevin Coyle
Birmingham Iron	Birmingham, Alabama	Legion Field	71,594	Tim Lewis
Memphis Express	Memphis, Tennessee	Liberty Bowl Memorial Stadium	58,325	Mike Singletary
Orlando Apollos	Orlando, Florida	Spectrum Stadium	44,206	Steve Spurrier
Western Conference
Arizona Hotshots	Tempe, Arizona	Sun Devil Stadium	57,078	Rick Neuheisel
Salt Lake Stallions	Salt Lake City, Utah	Rice–Eccles Stadium	45,807	Dennis Erickson
San Antonio Commanders	San Antonio, Texas	Alamodome	64,000	Mike Riley
San Diego Fleet	San Diego, California	SDCCU Stadium	70,561	Mike Martz

Locations of teams for the 2019 AAF season.
Eastern Conference Western Conference

== Rules ==
Ebersol deliberately avoided making radical changes to the rules of the game so as to make it recognizable to the U.S. public. He stated that he used the average length of a feature film, slightly over two hours, as the basis for a typical fan's attention span.

- Teams had 52 players on each roster, with some selected by a territorial draft. The territory assigned to a team consisted of at least five colleges plus designated professional teams, one Canadian Football League, and four NFL teams (players from colleges outside the AAF footprint being allocated based on their most recent professional team). Only one quarterback could be taken from their region.
  - For the inaugural season, a quarterbacks-only "Protect or Pick" draft was conducted in November 2018 in which teams could retain their allocated quarterback or select an unprotected quarterback from another team.
- Telecasts featured no television timeouts and 60 percent fewer "full-screen commercials," with the league aiming for an approximate real-time game length of 150 minutes, down from just over 180 in the NFL. In turn, the AAF aimed to charge more money for the remaining commercial slots, also alluding to product placement opportunities that did not interrupt the game telecast.
- There were no extra point kicks; teams had to attempt two-point conversions after a touchdown.
- Defenses were forbidden from advancing ("rushing") more than five players on or across the line of scrimmage, and no defensive player could cross the line of scrimmage from more than two yards outside the offensive tackles. The "illegal defense" penalty for violating these rules was a 15-yard penalty.
- There were no kickoffs; possession at the start of each half, and after touchdowns and field goals, began on a team's own 25-yard line, in line with the NFL touchbacks. After a safety, the scoring team received possession at their own 35-yard line.
  - In lieu of an onside kick, a team could keep possession of the ball by attempting an "onside conversion", a scrimmage play from their own 28-yard line and gaining at least 12 yards (essentially, a fourth-and-12 play). A team was not allowed to attempt such a play after a field goal or touchdown unless it was trailing by 17 or more points, or during the final two minutes of the first half, or during the final five minutes of the second half. The onside conversion play was also available after any safety, played from the 18-yard line.
- The play clock ran only 35 seconds, five seconds shorter than in the NFL, but still longer than the CFL's 20 seconds, timed from the spotting of the football. (The league originally proposed a 30-second play clock, but Ebersol concluded it would negatively impact the quality of play.)
- Players could not throw the football into the stands or hand it off to a spectator following a touchdown. While other leagues (particularly the NCAA) have similar rules in place using rationale based on sportsmanship, the primary motivation for the AAF rule appears to be economic as its footballs (manufactured by Wilson Sporting Goods and marked with distinctive red, blue, and white stripes) contain expensive tracking technology. The penalty for such behavior was unsportsmanlike conduct, a 15-yard penalty, and if it is determined to be deliberate, a fine can be assessed to the offending player. Other touchdown celebrations are generally tolerated.
  - Trent Richardson of the Birmingham Iron was penalized during the first week of AAF play, when a ball he spiked after scoring a touchdown bounced into the stands. AAF officials later determined that Richardson's actions were accidental and did not assess the fine, also apologizing for the penalty.
- There were no automatic instant replay reviews of scoring plays or turnovers as there are in the NFL. Each team was given two coach's challenges, which they could use at any time outside the two-minute warning, and received a third if both challenges were successful. After the two-minute warning in each half and during overtime, the replay booth had sole authority to call for a replay review.
- Outside organizations handled head-safety protocols.
- In the event of a tie at the end of regulation, a single overtime period would be played, under the high school football rules of the "Kansas Playoff." Each team would begin on their opponent's 10-yard line and be given one possession (four downs) to score, with no field goals allowed. Had a score remained tied after each team was given their possession, the game would end in a tie. Both teams would be given one timeout per overtime possession. The coin toss winner could choose to possess first or defer. Had the AAF reached the postseason, accounts differed on what system would be used; early reports had repeated rounds of the Kansas Playoff played until a winner was determined, but later reports stated that the AAF would use sudden death (golden point), which had been abolished at all other levels of football by the time of the AAF's debut.
- Playoffs would have consisted of four teams, the top two teams from each conference.
- Officiating crews had eight members on the field, similar to NCAA Division I football, instead of the standard seven-official system used in the NFL and CFL (the eighth officiating member was the center judge). AAF officiating also had a ninth member, called a sky judge, an off-the-field official who reviews every play using technology like a booth review. The sky judge could call or take away penalties missed or made by the field officials.

== Business ==
The Alliance operated as a single entity, with all teams owned and operated by the league, under the name Legendary Field Exhibitions LLC. Some of the investors in the AAF included Peter Thiel's Founders Fund, The Chernin Group (which owns Barstool Sports), Jared Allen, Slow Ventures, Adrian Fenty, Charles King's M Ventures, and Keith Rabois. Long-term plans were for the AAF to sell franchises to individual owners.

MGM Resorts International made an investment in the AAF tech platform, and entered a three-year sponsorship agreement to become the league's official sports betting sponsor and exclusive gaming partner. The deal marked the first time any sports organization had sold exclusive in-game betting rights to a sportsbook. Scott Butera, MGM's director of interactive gaming (the division that signed an agreement with the AAF), was formerly the commissioner of the Arena Football League before his 2018 ouster. Under the terms of the agreement, MGM Resorts International owned all rights to the tech platform in the event the league ceases operations, preventing an investor from buying the league solely for access to the technology. Gambling functions were never implemented on the league's app, and many planned features for the app never materialized due to technical glitches and impracticality.

The league also had player bonuses and scholarships, with player bonuses based on performance and fan interaction, players were to earn a year's scholarship in post-secondary education for each season of play. Players got three-year, non-guaranteed contracts worth $250,000 plus health insurance with an escape clause to go to the NFL. The three-year contract was believed to be purposely targeting the XFL to prevent second-tier professional players from signing with the XFL if they played in the AAF in 2019. XFL commissioner Oliver Luck stated that he did not believe that such a clause would hold up in court after the AAF collapsed, and that the XFL would be willing to sign AAF players. The league also has an incentive system that pays members of a team's offensive and defensive units for statistical achievements and also pays players to perform community service; the exact details of this incentive system were not yet finalized at the start of the 2019 season. Players are assigned to each team by way of a centralized process that is largely a trade secret. The league showed willingness to offer more money to marquee players; Landry Jones noted that Ebersol had personally promised a salary of over $1,000,000 to Jones if he played for the San Antonio Commanders; when Jones pressed Ebersol on when he would be paid, Ebersol became evasive, leading Jones to reject the offer. Matt McGloin likewise turned down the AAF, both because of his skepticism over the league and the birth of his child. For the fans, in addition to a fantasy league built into mobile broadcasts, there were low ticket prices (each team have a $35/game sideline seat option) and inexpensive food at games. When the league abruptly folded, the league left players to personally pay outstanding bills for their own hotels, as well as their transportation home and even their medical bills from injuries sustained during play.

The AAF coaching salaries varied by title, with $500,000 for head coaches, $200–250,000 for coordinators, and $75–150,000 for position coaches. Each AAF team employed between 11 and 13 total coaches, putting the total coaching staff expenditures at around $2 million per staff and $16 million for the entire league.

=== Dundon investment ===
On February 18, 2019, the league announced that Tom Dundon, whose other holdings include the Carolina Hurricanes of the National Hockey League (NHL) and TopGolf, agreed to invest $250 million into the league. He was also named the new chairman of the AAF, and Dundon reportedly received a majority stake in the league in exchange for his investment. Dundon's investment was initially reported to be due to the league being in danger of not making payroll. The league claimed the payroll issue was due to a glitch in the league's changing of payroll companies, and that Dundon's investment had already been planned. Dundon later backtracked on his previous claim of a $250 million investment, noting that he had not actually delivered a $250 million lump sum to the league. Dundon planned to incrementally invest in the league, using $250 million as a theoretical maximum based on if the league were to "aggressively expand," and reserved the right to pull out of the league at any time. At the time of the reported April 2 suspension, Dundon had invested an estimated $70 million into the AAF. He had drastically reduced unnecessary expenses and mostly abandoned the technology platform by the end of the league's operations in a desperate attempt to keep the league financially viable.

Ebersol had admitted prior to the start of the season that, on numerous occasions, the AAF had come dangerously close to folding before its first game due to various unstated complications. When asked whether some of the AAF's initial investors had dropped out, Ebersol declined to answer. After the league suspended operations, it was revealed that one of the league's major investors, former Minnesota Vikings minority owner Reggie Fowler, had indeed pulled his funding after the inaugural game, necessitating the abrupt sale to Dundon. It came out in late April that Fowler's funds had been frozen by the Department of Justice, after Fowler's indictment on charges of money laundering for cryptocurrency exchanges. He was later sentenced to over six years in prison.

In early March 2019, it was revealed by Bill Polian that the AAF and National Football League were in informal discussions about a system where players under contract to NFL teams could be loaned to AAF teams. The idea would have been for NFL teams to assign their third-string quarterback and other players from the bottom half of their roster and practice squads to the AAF to gain more playing time in a similar system to what used to be in place during the existence of NFL Europe. This would have in effect made the AAF an official developmental league of the NFL. Dundon sought a change in the NFL's collective bargaining agreement to protect AAF players who may get injured and miss NFL playing time by ensuring the players still earned a salary from the NFL during their recovery. In late March, Dundon stated that, in reference to the National Football League Players Association (NFLPA) and its reluctance to cooperate out of concern for injuries, if they are "not going to give us young players, we can't be a development league". He added that the AAF was looking at its options, including discontinuing the league if the NFLPA wasn't willing to work with the league. Profootballtalk.com reported shortly thereafter, citing unnamed sources, that if Dundon's demands were not met, he was willing to end his investment before the season ended, possibly as soon as after Week 8, which would cut off the league's cash flow and force it to immediately fold with the playoffs and championship left unplayed. As Week 8 passed, Dundon reiterated his stance on April 1, stating he was still willing to pull his funding before the next week's game.

Ultimately, the AAF lost an estimated $88 million overall, earning only $12 million in revenue against its $100 million expenses.

=== Legal matters ===
In late February 2019, a lawsuit by a venture capitalist in Los Angeles became public, as the AAF issued a statement denying a claim by Robert Vanech that the league was his idea and that he had a handshake agreement with Charlie Ebersol; Vanech is seeking financial damages and 50 percent ownership of the league. As at 2024 the matter has not been resolved.

Also in late February, the league revealed that it had been unable to secure a league-wide worker's compensation insurance policy prior to the start of the season, forcing the Orlando Apollos to move its practice operations to Kingsland, Georgia, and commute to Orlando for games, as Florida does not consider professional athletes to be eligible for worker's compensation.

In April 2019, after the league suspended football operations, two players—punter Colton Schmidt of the Birmingham Iron and linebacker Reggie Northrup of the Orlando Apollos—filed a class action lawsuit in California, claiming that they were misled about the financial viability of the league and that the league entered contracts with players in bad faith.

Also in April, two former front-office league employees filed a class action lawsuit in California, claiming that the league violated the Worker Adjustment and Retraining Notification Act of 1988, which requires large companies to give at least a 60-day advanced notice before large layoffs.

Reggie Fowler was arrested April 30, 2019, on charges related to operating a massive cryptocurrency scam in 2018, the funds for which were used to fund his AAF investments.

In November 2022, the trustees handling the AAF bankruptcy filed a lawsuit against Dundon seeking the remainder of the $250 million investment he had publicly promised, alleging he owed the $184 million debt to the league. Dundon countersued Ebersol for the $70 million he had previously invested. The case proceeded to trial as Osherow v. Dundon, Zutter & DCP in United States Bankruptcy Court for the Western District of Texas in 2025, with Craig Gargotta hearing the case. Ebersol, Dundon and NFL Commissioner Roger Goodell were among the 23 witnesses who testified in the case.

On November 25, 2025, in an outcome similar to that of the United States Football League of the 1980s, Gargotta ruled in favor of Randolph Osherow, the AAF's bankruptcy trustee, but only ordered Dundon to pay a nominal $1 judgment. Gargotta commented that widespread vagaries in the testimony meant there was not enough proof to identify specific damages nor corroborate the claim that Dundon had ever formally committed to investing the $250 million, and that Ebersol's own miscues in rushing the league's launch were a greater factor in its failure, but that there was enough evidence to declare that Dundon had used the league for self-dealing to his own business properties.

== Key people ==
=== Executives ===
- Charlie Ebersol, co-founder and CEO
- Bill Polian, co-founder and Head of Football
- J. K. McKay, Head of Football Operations
- Troy Polamalu, Head of Player Relations
- Hines Ward, Head of Football Development
- Tom Veit, Head of Business Operations
- Mike Pereira, Officiating Consultant
- Dean Blandino, Officiating Consultant

Player Engagement Board Of Advisors

- Jared Allen
- Justin Tuck

=== Board of directors ===
- Tom Dundon, chairman
- Dick Ebersol (ousted midseason)
- Keith Rabois

== Media ==
As part of its formation, the AAF announced broadcast deals with CBS Sports; opening day (consisting of two regionally-televised games) was scheduled for CBS, as well as a playoff semifinal and the championship game. The telecasts made extensive use of on-field microphones (with head coaches and quarterbacks also miked), and Skycams (with two deployed for each game, with one along the sideline, as opposed to having more than one high camera). Half of the games broadcast each week were produced off-site from Sneaky Big Studios in Scottsdale, Arizona: graphics (which were provided by CBS), Skycam operations, and commentary were performed remotely from the Scottsdale site, as well as studio coverage for all games (via a virtual studio). Ebersol did not disclose whether or not the league was buying the airtime or receiving the airtime for free as part of a partnership agreement. After the season ended, it was confirmed that the AAF had resorted to buying airtime and was unlikely to be able to extract a rights fee from any of its partners for its foreseeable future, a factor in Dundon's decision to withdraw his investment. CBS broadcast an ad for the league during its coverage of Super Bowl LIII.

CBS Sports Network aired one game per week, and was scheduled to air one of the playoff games. In addition to local stations, TNT was announced as broadcasting two games per season (one regular season and a playoff game which later was expanded to include three regular season games) while NFL Network aired two weekly games. Turner's B/R Live streamed one game a week, and the league's mobile app offered an alternate "AAF Raw" feed for most games (excluding those carried by CBSSN), which featured no commentary or graphics. Integrated fantasy games were available through the AAF site and app as well.

CBSSN's game of the week was called by Ben Holden, Adam Archuleta, and John Schriffen. NFL Network's broadcast team for week one consisted of Dan Hellie on play-by-play and Marvin Lewis on color commentary. TNT's broadcast team consisted of Brian Anderson on play-by-play, Lewis on color commentary, and Maurice Jones-Drew as sideline reporter. The league did not use set announcer pairings, rotating numerous hosts (several of them from CBS's NFL and college football crews) on both play-by-play and color commentary, depending on availability.

Sirius XM Radio, a satellite radio service, carried a select Game of the Week. Additionally, teams made broadcast deals with local radio affiliates.

== Reception ==
=== Critics ===
The AAF received mixed to positive reviews opening night. Profootballtalk.com, in a mostly positive review, praised the league's television product and choice of markets that would embrace the league, singling out the live look-ins at the replay booth during coach's challenges as an innovation that could transfer to the NFL's television broadcasts. The on-field level of play was somewhat less well-received, being compared to NFL preseason levels, with numerous offensive miscues. SB Nation had a similar assessment, criticizing the game play as "much worse than... most of major college football," while at the same time noting that the league's innovations were largely successful in making games more interesting. In an admittedly incomplete review, Peter King stated that although he would not yet draw any "major conclusions" about the league, he liked some of the rule changes but feared the overtime process would be a gimmick.

=== Viewership ===
Overnight Nielsen Ratings stated that the league-opening regionally televised games on CBS were the highest rated telecast of the night in the key demographic, drawing more viewers than an NBA game on ABC in the same time slot. In overall viewers, both the AAF and NBA lost to a rerun of America's Got Talent: The Champions on NBC. The NFL Network telecast that week secured 640,000 viewers. With these comparatively strong initial viewership statistics, the Week 2 ratings were highly anticipated in the interest of developing trended data. In Week 2, the afternoon and evening games on Saturday, February 16, reportedly attracted 1,018,000 and 425,000 viewers, respectively, in addition to the Sunday evening game on February 17 drawing 424,000 viewers. Week 3's NFL Network games drew 491,000 and 515,000 viewers, benefiting in part due to a counterprogramming effort against the 91st Academy Awards. Week 4's ratings were largely consistent with those of week 2, with the two NFL Network games that week securing ratings of 404,000 and 450,000 viewers, comparable to college basketball and NHL telecasts on the other sports networks. The disparity between the afternoon and evening games is consistent due to increased competition during primetime hours and the higher market penetration of CBS and TNT compared to NFL Network and CBS Sports Network, the latter of which does not register a rating in the Nielsens.

In March 2019, building upon these ratings successes, both CBS and TNT added games to their packages; Turner Sports shifted two additional Saturday afternoon games from B/R Live to TNT (with B/R Live streaming a Skycam-only feed of the games as a companion), while CBS announced that it would shift two games from CBS Sports Network to broadcast television, including a regular season game on April 6, 2019 (in the afternoon prior to CBS's broadcast of the 2019 NCAA Final Four), and one of the conference championship games. However, due to the suspension of football operations, these games were left unplayed.

== Notable players ==
By one 2025 measurement, 15 AAF players went on to earn more than $1,000,000 in career earnings in professional football following their time in the AAF. The following lists notable AAF players:

- Daniel Brunskill (offensive lineman)
- Nick Folk (kicker)
- Garrett Gilbert (quarterback)
- Younghoe Koo (kicker)
- D'Ernest Johnson (running back)
- Greg Ward (running back)

=== Starting quarterbacks ===
Team	Quarterback(s)
Eastern Conference
Atlanta Legends	Matt Simms (1–4); Aaron Murray (1–2)
Birmingham Iron	Luis Perez (4–3); Keith Price (1–0)
Memphis Express	Zach Mettenberger (1–2); Brandon Silvers (1–1); Christian Hackenberg (0–3)
Orlando Apollos	Garrett Gilbert (7–1)
Western Conference
Arizona Hotshots	John Wolford (5–3)
Salt Lake Stallions	Josh Woodrum (3–4); Austin Allen (0–1)
San Antonio Commanders	Logan Woodside (5–3)
San Diego Fleet	Mike Bercovici (1–4); Philip Nelson (2–1)

== See also ==
- XFL (2020)
- United States Football League (2022)
- United Football League (2024)
