= List of Dartmouth Big Green in the NFL draft =

This is a list of Dartmouth Big Green players in the NFL draft.

== Key ==
B	Back	K	Kicker	NT	Nose tackle
C	Center	LB	Linebacker	FB	Fullback
DB	Defensive back	P	Punter	HB	Halfback
DE	Defensive end	QB	Quarterback	WR	Wide receiver
DT	Defensive tackle	RB	Running back	G	Guard
E	End	T	Offensive tackle	TE	Tight end

== Selections ==
Year	Round	Pick	Overall	Player	Team	Position
1939	1	5	5	Bob MacLeod	Brooklyn Dodgers	B
1944	16	11	164	Roger Antaya	Boston Yanks	G
1944	28	9	294	Nick Daukas	Philadelphia Eagles	T
1945	10	4	91	Don Kasprzak	Boston Yanks	B
1945	13	2	122	John Monahan	Pittsburgh Steelers	E
1945	19	2	188	Jim Landrigan	Pittsburgh Steelers	T
1946	18	2	162	Don Alverez	Boston Yanks	G
1946	25	7	237	Ed Grygiel	Philadelphia Eagles	B
1946	29	2	272	Carl McKinnon	Boston Yanks	G
1947	27	4	249	Art Young	Pittsburgh Steelers	G
1948	22	4	199	Fran O'Brien	Boston Yanks	B
1949	4	1	32	Joe Sullivan	Detroit Lions	B
1949	9	10	91	Jonathan Jenkins	Philadelphia Eagles	T
1949	12	10	121	Dale Armstrong	Philadelphia Eagles	E
1950	5	3	56	Tom Rowe	Pittsburgh Steelers	E
1950	5	4	57	Hal Fitkin	Detroit Lions	B
1950	12	1	145	Bill Dey	Baltimore Colts	B
1950	15	13	196	Herb Carey	Philadelphia Eagles	B
1953	17	1	194	George Rambour	Baltimore Colts	T
1954	11	8	129	Dave McLaughlin	Philadelphia Eagles	E
1963	11	13	153	Don McKinnon	New York Giants	C
1968	11	26	299	Gordon Rule	Green Bay Packers	DB
1971	8	25	207	Willie Bogan	Baltimore Colts	DB
1976	3	22	82	Reggie Williams	Cincinnati Bengals	LB
1976	17	6	465	Tom Fleming	Cleveland Browns	WR
1978	6	5	143	Gregg Robinson	New York Jets	DT
1998	6	5	158	Zack Walz	Arizona Cardinals	LB
2004	7	27	228	Casey Cramer	Tampa Bay Buccaneers	RB

== Notable undrafted players ==
Note: No drafts held before 1920

Debut year	Player name	Position	Debut NFL/AFL team	Notes
1960	Jake Crouthamel	RB	Boston Patriots	—
1978	Nick Lowery	K	New England Patriots	—
1981	Jeff Kemp	QB	Los Angeles Rams	—
1981	Dave Shula	WR	Baltimore Colts	—
1994	Jay Fiedler	QB	Philadelphia Eagles	—
2016	Jacob Flores	C	Green Bay Packers	—
2016	Vernon Harris	CB	Kansas City Chiefs	—
2018	Jack Heneghan	QB	San Francisco 49ers	—
2019	Matt Kaskey	T	Los Angeles Rams	—
2020	Niko Lalos	LB	New York Giants	—
2026	Delby Lemieux	C	Minnesota Vikings	—
