= Jhurell Pressley =

American football player (born 1992)

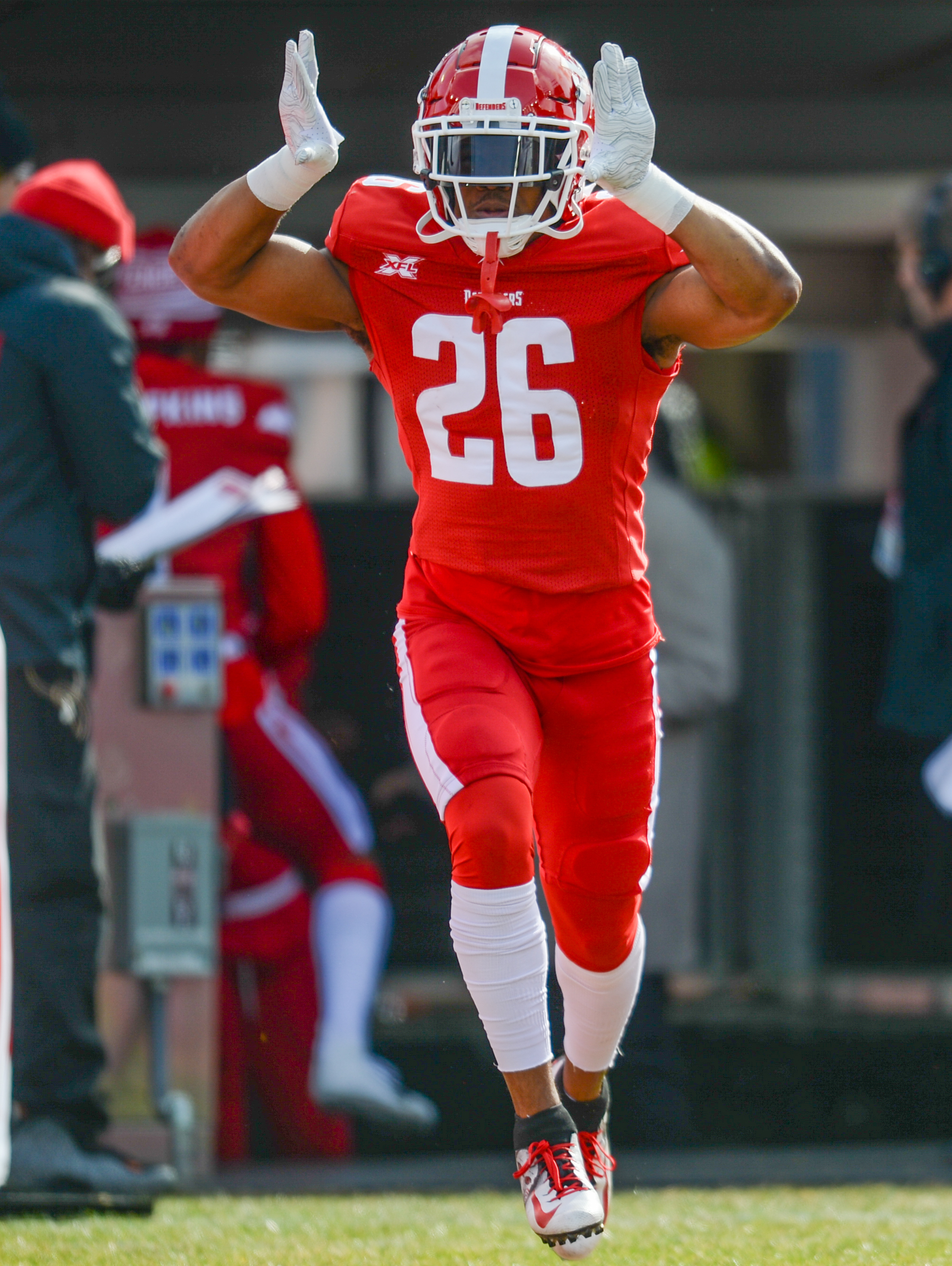
- Pressley with the DC Defenders in 2020

No. 26, 42
- Position: Running back

Personal information
- Born: May 20, 1992 (age 34); Newark, Delaware, U.S.
- Listed height: 5 ft 11 in (1.80 m)
- Listed weight: 209 lb (95 kg)

Career information
- High school: Red Lion Christian Academy (Bear, Delaware)
- College: New Mexico
- NFL draft: 2016: undrafted

Career history
- Minnesota Vikings (2016)*; Green Bay Packers (2016); Atlanta Falcons (2016–2017)*; Jacksonville Jaguars (2017)*; New York Giants (2018)*; Arizona Hotshots (2019); DC Defenders (2020); IBM Big Blue (2022)
- * Offseason or practice squad member only

Awards and highlights
- AAF Rushing Yards Leader (2019)
- Stats at Pro Football Reference

Jhurell Pressley (born May 20, 1992) is an American former professional football player who was a running back in the National Football League (NFL). He played college football for the New Mexico Lobos and was signed by the Minnesota Vikings as an undrafted free agent in 2016. He was also a member of the Green Bay Packers, Atlanta Falcons, Jacksonville Jaguars, New York Giants, Arizona Hotshots, DC Defenders, and IBM Big Blue.

== Early life ==
Jhurell was born on May 20, 1992, in Newark, Delaware, to Valerie Pasley and Edward Pressley. He has two older sisters and three older brothers. Pressley has stated his favorite athlete is NBA All-Star Dwyane Wade. He played high school football at Red Lion Christian Academy.

== College career ==
Pressley attended the University of New Mexico, where he played on the Lobos from 2011 to 2015. While at New Mexico, he majored in sociology.

=== Statistics ===
Source: GoLobos.com

Year	Team	G	Rushing					Receiving				
Year	Team	G	Att	Yds	Avg	Lng	TD	Rec	Yds	Avg	Lng	TD
2012	UNM	13	104	462	4.4	40	6	4	86	21.5	55	1
2013	UNM	12	29	273	9.4	80	6	6	68	11.3	40	0
2014	UNM	12	114	1,083	9.5	77	12	7	46	6.6	32	0
2015	UNM	13	147	907	6.2	75	11	1	2	2.0	2	0
Total		50	394	2,725	6.9	80	35	18	202	11.2	55	1

== Professional career ==
Pre-draft measurables
Height	Weight	40-yard dash	10-yard split	20-yard split	20-yard shuttle	Three-cone drill	Vertical jump	Broad jump	Bench press
5 ft 10 in (1.78 m)	206 lb (93 kg)	4.40 s	1.44 s	2.57 s	4.15 s	7.01 s	33.5 in (0.85 m)	9 ft 9 in (2.97 m)	25 reps
All values are from Pro Day

=== Minnesota Vikings ===
After going undrafted in the 2016 NFL draft, Pressley signed with the Minnesota Vikings on May 2, 2016. On September 3, 2016, he was waived by the Vikings during final team cuts.

=== Green Bay Packers ===
On September 5, 2016, Pressley was claimed off waivers by the Green Bay Packers. He was released by the Packers on September 14, 2016.

=== Atlanta Falcons ===
Pressley was signed to the Atlanta Falcons' practice squad on October 25, 2016. On August 16, 2017, Pressley re-signed with the Falcons. He was waived on September 2, 2017, and was signed to the Falcons' practice squad the next day. He was released on September 19, 2017.

=== Jacksonville Jaguars ===
On September 26, 2017, Pressley was signed to the Jacksonville Jaguars' practice squad. He was released on October 9, 2017.

=== New York Giants ===
On August 20, 2018, Pressley signed with the New York Giants. He was waived on September 1, 2018, and was signed to the practice squad the next day. He was released on November 8, 2018.

=== Arizona Hotshots ===
On February 10, 2019, Pressley made his debut for the Arizona Hotshots in their season opener against the Salt Lake Stallions. His 64 rushing yards and 30-yard touchdown reception in the opener earned him AAF Team of the Week honors. The league ceased operations in April 2019.

Pressley was suspended for the first two weeks of the 2019 NFL season for violating the NFL's performance-enhancing drugs policy on April 5, 2019. He was reinstated from suspension on September 17, 2019.

=== DC Defenders ===
Pressley was taken in the 3rd round in the 2020 XFL Draft by the DC Defenders. He had his contract terminated when the league suspended operations on April 10, 2020.
