= Phil Savage =

American football executive (born 1965)

Los Angeles Rams
- Title: Senior Personnel Executive

Personal information
- Born: April 7, 1965 (age 61); Mobile, Alabama, U.S.

Career information
- High school: Murphy (Mobile, Alabama)
- College: Sewanee; Alabama

Career history

Coaching
- University of Alabama (1987–1989) Graduate assistant; UCLA (1990) Tight ends coach; San Antonio Riders (1991); Cleveland Browns (1991–1993) Defensive assistant

Operations
- Cleveland Browns (1993–1995); College scout (1993–1994); National scout (1995); Baltimore Ravens (1996–2004); Director of college scouting (1996–2002); Director of player personnel (2003–2004); Cleveland Browns (2005–2008) Senior vice president & general manager; Philadelphia Eagles (2010–2012); Player personnel consultant (2010–2011); Player personnel executive (2011–2012); Senior Bowl (2012–2018) Executive director; Arizona Hotshots (2019) General manager; New York Jets (2019–2025); Senior personnel advisor (2019–2024); Interim general manager (2024); Consultant (2025); Los Angeles Rams (2026–present) Senior personnel executive

Awards and highlights
- Super Bowl champion (XXXV)
- Executive profile at Pro Football Reference

Phillip Savage Jr. (born April 7, 1965) is an American professional football executive, author and media personality who is a senior personnel executive for the Los Angeles Rams of the National Football League (NFL). He previously served as the senior personnel advisor for the New York Jets from 2019 to 2024, and as their interim general manager in 2024.

In 2019, Savage was the general manager for the Arizona Hotshots of the Alliance of American Football (AAF). He was the senior vice president and general manager of the Browns from 2005 to 2008. He served as director of player personnel for the Baltimore Ravens under general manager Ozzie Newsome, a former Browns' player and member of the Pro Football Hall of Fame, from 2003 to 2004. He was a scout for the Browns from 1993 to 1995. He was also the former general manager of the Cleveland Browns and the executive director for the Senior Bowl. Phil Savage also served as the color announcer for The Alabama Crimson Tide alongside Eli Gold for several years with the Crimson Tide Sports Network, and worked as a guest host, for Sirius XM Sports Radio for several years, before joining the NY Jets. Phil Savage was also on ESPN for several years as a guest host.

== Early life ==
Savage attended high school at Murphy High School in Mobile, Alabama, and played football and baseball at the University of the South (Sewanee, Tennessee). He earned a Bachelor of Arts in English and was a three-time all-conference shortstop in baseball. He received a master's degree in physical education from the University of Alabama in 1989.

Savage spent the first seven years of his career in the coaching ranks at Alabama, UCLA, and with the San Antonio Riders of the World League.

== Executive career ==
=== Cleveland Browns ===
Savage began his career in the National Football League (NFL) as an intern with the Cleveland Browns in 1991. Savage was hired by the new Browns head coach Bill Belichick as a coach and made the transition to scouting and personnel in 1994. During his first stint in Cleveland, he worked with several talented young scouts and assistant coaches that Belichick had assembled, including Nick Saban, Kirk Ferentz, Pat Hill, and Jim Bates.

=== Baltimore Ravens ===
Savage worked his way up the ladder in the front office as a scout and personnel evaluator with the Browns, eventually following Cleveland's former owner Art Modell and the rest of the front office to Baltimore in 1995.

Savage then played an important role in the drafting of 10 Pro Bowl players: offensive tackle Jonathan Ogden, linebacker Ray Lewis, receiver Jermaine Lewis, linebacker Peter Boulware, cornerback Chris McAlister, running back Jamal Lewis, linebacker Adalius Thomas, tight end Todd Heap, safety Ed Reed and linebacker Terrell Suggs.

=== Cleveland Browns (second stint) ===
Savage was named senior vice president and general manager of the Cleveland Browns on January 6, 2005. On December 30, reports surfaced that Savage was on the verge of being fired after less than one year on the job, an item that was quickly denied by Browns management. The speculation was based on a reported personality conflict between Savage and Browns team president John Collins. Four days after the organizational rift became public, it was Collins who resigned his post after losing the power struggle with Savage.

Savage stole the headlines in the first round of the 2007 NFL draft as the Browns drafted Wisconsin offensive tackle Joe Thomas with the third pick overall, and then acquired Notre Dame quarterback Brady Quinn with the 22nd pick, acquired through a trade with the Dallas Cowboys. The Browns gave up their 2007 second-round pick and 2008 first-round draft selection to Dallas for the chance to pick Quinn.

The Browns signed Savage to a three-year extension through 2012 on May 2, 2008. However, after a poor 2008 season and an email controversy involving a fan, Savage was fired on December 28.

=== Philadelphia Eagles ===
On February 4, 2010, Savage was hired by the Philadelphia Eagles as a player personnel consultant. In his role, Savage worked with general manager Howie Roseman and director of player personnel Ryan Grigson in preparation for the 2010 NFL draft, specifically in the evaluation of draft prospects in the southeast part of the country. He was re-hired during training camp.

=== Senior Bowl ===
Savage was named the executive director for the Senior Bowl in May 2012 where he served until May 2018. During that time he worked as the color analysis for the Crimson Tide Sports Network.

=== Arizona Hotshots ===
In June 2018, Savage joined the Arizona Hotshots of the Alliance of American Football as their general manager.

=== New York Jets ===
In 2019, Savage was hired by the New York Jets as a senior personnel advisor under general manager Joe Douglas.

On November 19, 2024, Savage was named interim general manager following the firing of general manager Joe Douglas. Following the season, the Jets organization retained Savage as a consultant.

=== Los Angeles Rams ===
On March 28, 2026, the Los Angeles Rams hired Savage as a player personnel consultant.

== Analyst career ==
In April 2009, with Savage no longer in the NFL, he was asked to provide color commentary for the University of Alabama A-Day game along with Eli Gold. Savage voiced an interest in the open position left vacant by Ken Stabler. In June 2009, Savage was officially named part of the Crimson Tide Sports Network (CTSN).
