= Patrick Lewis =

American football player (born 1991)

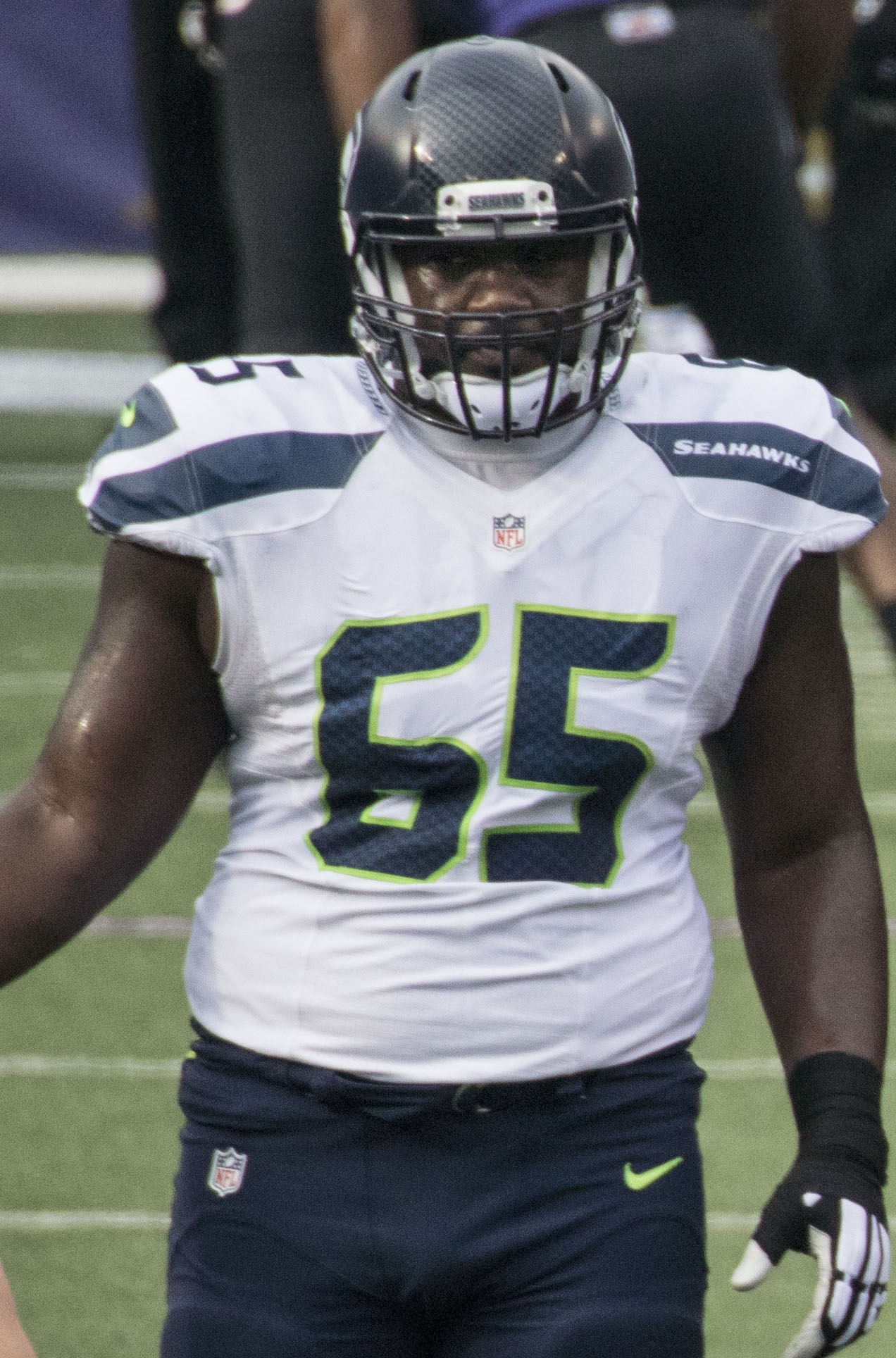
- Lewis with the Seattle Seahawks in 2015

No. 65, 67
- Position: Center

Personal information
- Born: January 30, 1991 (age 35); Reserve, Louisiana, U.S.
- Listed height: 6 ft 1 in (1.85 m)
- Listed weight: 311 lb (141 kg)

Career information
- High school: East St. John (Reserve)
- College: Texas A&M
- NFL draft: 2013: undrafted

Career history
- Green Bay Packers (2013)*; Cleveland Browns (2013); Jacksonville Jaguars (2013); Seattle Seahawks (2014)*; Cleveland Browns (2014)*; Seattle Seahawks (2014–2015); Buffalo Bills (2016); San Antonio Commanders (2019)*; Arizona Hotshots (2019)
- * Offseason or practice squad member only

Career NFL statistics
- Games played: 17
- Games started: 13
- Stats at Pro Football Reference

Patrick Lewis Jr. (born January 30, 1991) is an American former professional football player who was a center in the National Football League (NFL). He played college football for the Texas A&M Aggies. Lewis was signed by the Green Bay Packers as an undrafted free agent in 2013.

== Early life ==
Lewis was born on January 30, 1991, in Reserve, Louisiana, to Patrick Sr. and Deidre Lewis. He grew up in LaPlace, Louisiana where he was enrolled in the St. John school system. He played high school football at East St. John High. While at East St. John, Lewis was rated the No. 4 center in the country and the No. 2 strongest offensive lineman in the class of 2009 by Rivals.com. SuperPrep named Lewis a Louisiana Top 40 recruit. The 5A-Louisiana Sports Writers Association named Lewis the First Team All-State Offensive Lineman.

== College career ==
Lewis received offers from Texas A&M, Southern Miss, Tulsa and Connecticut. Lewis chose Texas A&M where as a true freshman he started 9 of 12 games during the 2009 season, playing as right guard. He started in all 13 games during his sophomore season in 2010. In his junior season in 2011, Lewis transitioned from guard to playing as center. While at A&M, Lewis was a University Studies major, with a focus in Agricultural and Life Sciences.

== Professional career ==
Pre-draft measurables
| Height | Weight | 40-yard dash | 10-yard split | 20-yard split | 20-yard shuttle | Three-cone drill | Vertical jump | Broad jump | Bench press |
|---|---|---|---|---|---|---|---|---|---|
| 6 ft 1 in (1.85 m) | 311 lb (141 kg) | 5.28 s | 1.84 s | 3.04 s | 4.93 s | 8.01 s | 29 in (0.74 m) | 8 ft 0 in (2.44 m) | 25 reps |
All values are from Pro Day

=== Green Bay Packers ===
After going undrafted in the 2013 NFL draft, Lewis signed with the Green Bay Packers on May 10, 2013. He was released by the Packers during final team cuts on August 31, 2013.

=== Cleveland Browns ===
On September 1, 2013, he was claimed off waivers by the Cleveland Browns. He was waived November 26 and re-signed to the Browns’ practice squad November 29.

=== Jacksonville Jaguars ===
On December 17, 2013, he was signed off of the Browns' practice squad by the Jacksonville Jaguars. The Jaguars released Lewis on August 24, 2014.

=== Seattle Seahawks ===
Lewis was claimed off waivers by the Seattle Seahawks on August 26, 2014. With Pro Bowl center Max Unger battling injuries, Lewis received more playing time than expected. In the 2014 season, he played in six games for the Seahawks, who kept a 4–0 record with Lewis as starting center. Even though Unger was traded to the New Orleans Saints in the offseason, Lewis was not named the starting center before the 2015 season. However, he regained the starting job from Drew Nowak prior to Week 10. He did an excellent job after regaining the center spot. On August 30, 2016, he was waived by the Seahawks.

=== Buffalo Bills ===
On August 31, 2016, Lewis was claimed off waivers by the Bills. On July 25, 2017, Lewis was released by the Bills.

=== Arizona Hotshots ===
On January 12, 2019, Lewis was signed by the Arizona Hotshots of the Alliance of American Football. The league ceased operations in April 2019.

Lewis was selected in the 2020 XFL draft by the Houston Roughnecks.
