= Gerald Christian =

American football player (born 1991)

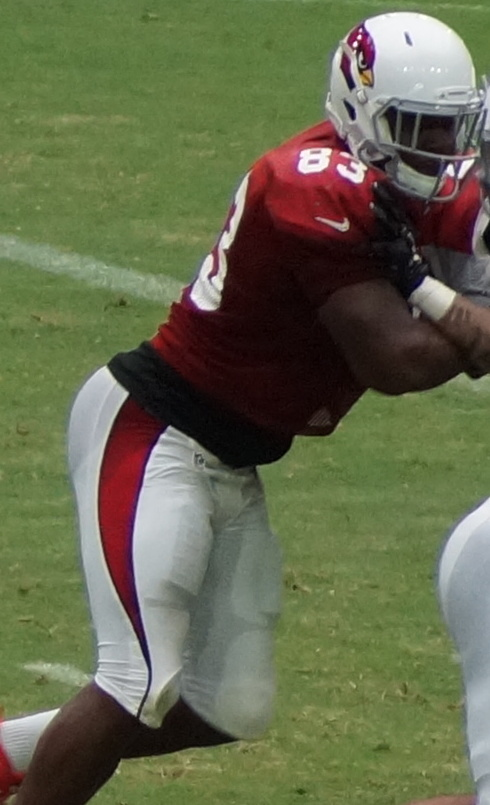
- Christian with the Arizona Cardinals in 2016

No. 83, 87
- Position: Tight end

Personal information
- Born: August 26, 1991 (age 35); Palm Beach Gardens, Florida, U.S.
- Listed height: 6 ft 3 in (1.91 m)
- Listed weight: 250 lb (113 kg)

Career information
- High school: William T. Dwyer (Palm Beach Gardens)
- College: Louisville
- NFL draft: 2015: 7th round, 256th overall pick

Career history
- Arizona Cardinals (2015); Buffalo Bills (2016); Arizona Cardinals (2017)*; Atlanta Legends (2019)*; Arizona Hotshots (2019)
- * Offseason or practice squad member only

Career NFL statistics
- Receptions: 1
- Receiving yards: 14
- Stats at Pro Football Reference

Gerald Christian (born August 26, 1991) is an American former professional football player who was a tight end in the National Football League (NFL) and Alliance of American Football (AAF). He was Mr. Irrelevant in 2015 when he was selected by the Arizona Cardinals with the 256th pick in the 2015 NFL draft. He played college football at Louisville. His brother, Geron Christian, also played college football at Louisville and in the NFL.

== Early life ==
Christian attended William T. Dwyer High School in Palm Beach Gardens, Florida.

== College career ==
Christian played for the Florida Gators from 2010 to 2011 and Louisville from 2012 to 2014. In his senior season in 2014, Christian caught 32 passes for 384 yards and five touchdowns. He was named third-team All-Atlantic Coast Conference (ACC).

== Professional career ==
Pre-draft measurables
Height	Weight	Arm length	Hand span	40-yard dash	10-yard split	20-yard split	20-yard shuttle	Three-cone drill	Bench press
6 ft 3 in (1.91 m)	244 lb (111 kg)	32 1/2 in (0.83 m)	10 3/4 in (0.27 m)	4.87 s	1.73 s	2.84 s	4.70 s	7.62 s	28 reps
All values from NFL Combine

=== Arizona Cardinals (first stint) ===
Christian was selected by the Arizona Cardinals with the final pick of the 7th round (256th overall pick) in the 2015 NFL draft, making him Mr. Irrelevant. Cardinals teammate Chandler Harnish, who was Mr. Irrelevant in 2012, announced the pick. On September 3, 2015, in the Cardinals' final preseason game against the Denver Broncos, Christian tore the MCL in his left knee. He was placed on season-ending injured reserve the next day. He went to the Cardinals' training camp in 2016, but he was released on August 29, 2016.

=== Buffalo Bills ===
On September 7, 2016, Christian was signed to the practice squad of the Buffalo Bills. He was promoted to the active roster on October 4, 2016. He was released on October 21, 2016, and was re-signed to the practice squad on October 25. He was elevated back to the active roster on October 28, 2016. He was released by the Bills on November 26, 2016, and was re-signed to the practice squad. He was promoted back to the active roster on December 3, 2016. In the three games Christian was activated, he had one reception for 14 yards.

On March 6, 2017, Christian was released by the Bills.

=== Arizona Cardinals (second stint) ===
On July 27, 2017, shortly before the summer training camp, Christian was signed by the Cardinals. He was waived at the end of training camp on September 2, 2017.

=== Arizona Hotshots ===
In November 2018, Christian signed with the Atlanta Legends of the Alliance of American Football, before the league's first (and only) season in the late winter of 2019. He eventually joined the Arizona Hotshots instead.

The league ceased operations in April 2019, 8 weeks into a scheduled 10-game regular season. Christian played in all 8 of the Hotshots' games, making 14 catches for 158 yards and scoring 1 touchdown.
