= Duxbury High School =

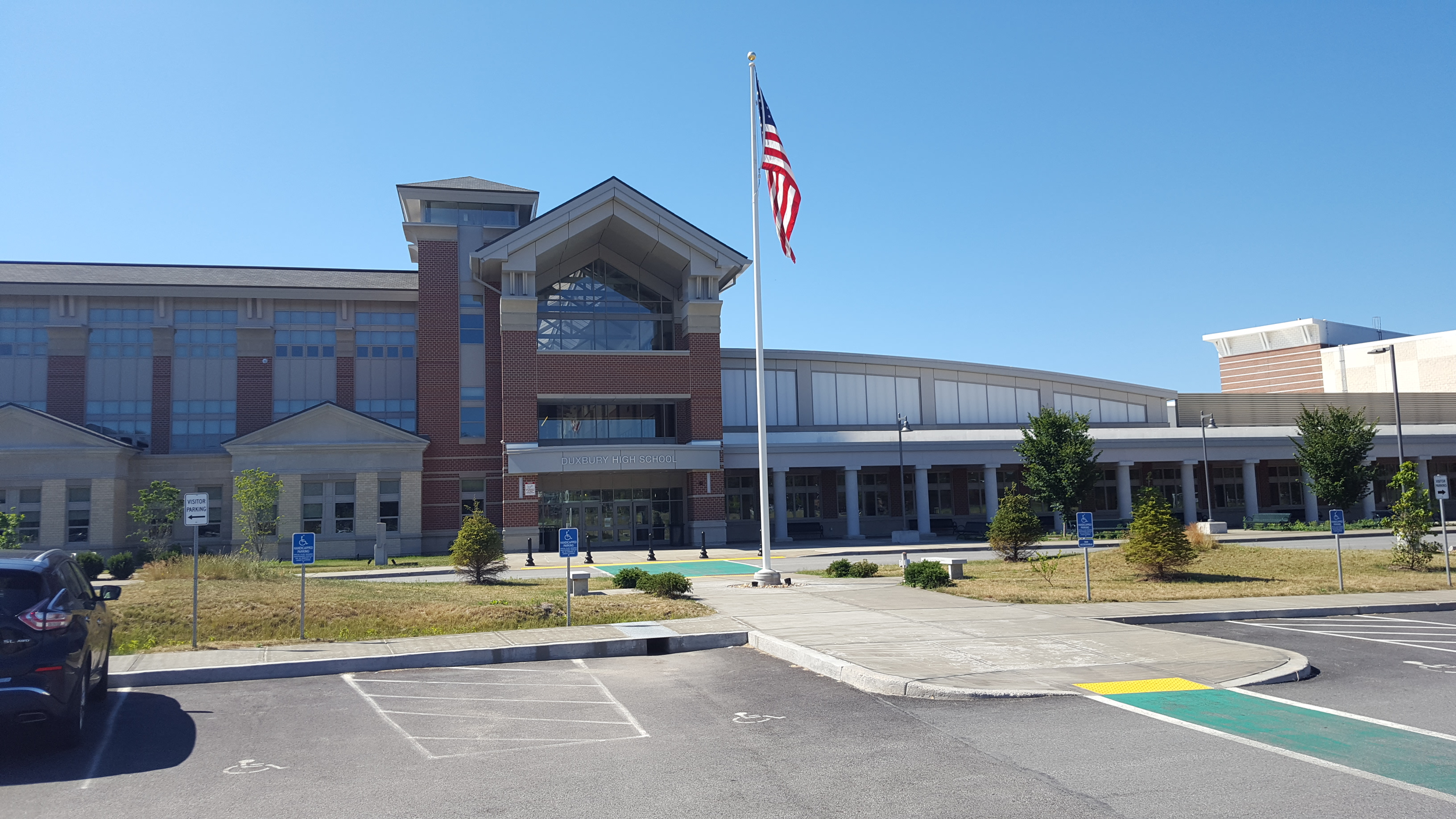
- Front of Duxbury High School

Location
- 71 Alden Street; Duxbury, Plymouth County, Massachusetts 02332; United States; 42.041999832°N 70.67416397°W

Information
- School type: Public, Public
- Motto: "Soar to New Heights"
- Established: 1866; 160 years ago
- School district: Duxbury Public Schools
- NCES District ID: 2504410
- Superintendent: Danielle Klingaman
- NCES School ID: 250441000594
- Principal: Todd Warmington (Interim '23-'24)
- Teaching staff: 80.81 (on an FTE basis)
- Grades: 9-12
- Enrollment: 862 (2023–2024)
  - Grade 9: 183
  - Grade 10: 220
  - Grade 11: 224
  - Grade 12: 233
- Average class size: 19.8
- Student to teacher ratio: 10.67
- Colors: Green, White & Silver
- Athletics: MIAA - Division 2
- Athletics conference: Patriot League
- Mascot: Dragons
- Newspaper: The Dragon Flyer
- Yearbook: The Partridge
- Website: https://www.duxbury.k12.ma.us/o/dhs

Duxbury High School is a public high school located in the town of Duxbury, Massachusetts, United States, and operating in the Duxbury Public School District. The superintendent of the Duxbury Public School District is Danielle Klingaman, the assistant superintendent is Beth Wilcox and the principal of Duxbury High School is Todd Warmington. The building that houses the Duxbury Middle and High School is located at 71 Alden Street, Duxbury, MA and was newly constructed in 2014. The Duxbury High School mascot is the Dragons and its school colors are green, white, and silver.

== History ==
The first high school in Duxbury was established as a private secondary school on Tremont and Depot Streets at the behest of U.S. Congressman George Partridge in 1844. A public high school in the town of Duxbury was first proposed in 1866. Public secondary education in Duxbury was originally conducted in privately owned buildings throughout the town. The town was unable to afford teachers' salaries from the outset. In 1868, an agreement between the Partridge Academy Trustees and the Town of Duxbury was reached, which allowed Duxbury's high school-age residents to attend the Partridge Academy. The Duxbury High School football team was established in the 1925–1926 school year, while schooling continued at Partridge Academy.

In 1927, a new high school building was constructed at 77 Alden Street for $85,000. The building served as the town's high school until the early 1960s and as an elementary school until 1997, when the Duxbury Free Library moved from the Wright Building to occupy 77 Alden Street. Beginning in the early 60's, Duxbury High School occupied two sites on Saint George Street, where it remained until 2013, when both buildings were razed and replaced with playing fields. The present building housing the high school is located at 71 Alden Street.

== Demographics ==
The 2023 total school population was 888 students, a figure 4% less than enrollment in 2019 and 8% less than enrollment in 2018.

Of the total number of students enrolled in Duxbury High School in 2023, 18.1% of High schools Need Students, 6.8% are Economically Disadvantaged, 0.3% are English Language Learners, 12.8% are Disabled, 0.3% are African-American, 1.6% are Asian-American, 2.8% are Hispanic, 3.2% are Multiracial, and 91.8% are White.

Of the 78 full-time teaching staff, 99.2% are licensed teachers and 89.2% are licensed teachers in the subject they teach.

== Academics ==
=== Ratings ===
In 2011, Duxbury High School was ranked #13 of all public Massachusetts high schools and #272 of national public high schools by U.S. News & World Report, while Boston Magazine ranked Duxbury High School #27 among 150 greater-Boston public high schools in the same year.

In 2017, U.S. News & World Report ranked the school #17 in Massachusetts and #271 nationally, while Boston Magazine ranked it #47 among greater-Boston area public high schools. The Massachusetts Department of Education placed Duxbury High School in the 92nd percentile of Massachusetts public high schools in 2017.

In 2020, the Massachusetts DoE classified Duxbury High School as a "School of Recognition" overall, placing it in the 99th percentile of public high schools in Massachusetts.

=== Opportunities ===
71.8% of students have access to participate in an arts course. 83.1% of 11th and 12th grade students have completed at least one advanced course, including Advanced Placement. 95.9% of 9th grade students pass all of their courses. 100% of students complete the MassCore program of studies.

=== Standardized test performance ===
Students who take the SAT averaged a score of 590 in Reading and 591 in Math in 2017. Students who scored a passing grade of 3 or higher on Advanced Placement examinations accounted for 73% in 2017. Students in the 10th grade who met or exceeded expectations on the MCAS ELA, Math, and Science portions numbered 89%, 86%, and 97%, respectively.

=== Funding ===
The total dollars spent per student amounted to $16,037 in 2020, $15,960 of which (all except $77) came from local and state funds.

=== Post-secondary preparedness ===
The four-year graduation rate is 98.8%, with 86.1% matriculating to a 4-year university and 2% matriculating to a 2-year university.

== Athletics ==
The Duxbury Dragons have won the following state championships.

=== Fall ===
- Football: 2005(2A), 2008(2A), 2010(2A), 2011(2), 2016(2), 2022(4), & 2023(4) (Division in Parentheses)
- Boys’ Golf: 1988, 1989, 1996, 2000, 2007, 2010, and 2011
- Boys’ Soccer: 1976, 1978, 1980, 1983, 1984, 1988, 1994, 1999
- Girls’ Soccer: 1984, 1994, 2008 & 2025

=== Winter ===
- Boys’ Basketball: 1989, 1994, & 2006
- Girls’ Basketball: 1998 & 2015
- Boys’ Hockey: 2000, 2005, 2007, & 2019
- Girls’ Hockey: 2011, 2012, 2013, 2014, 2023 & 2024
- Girls’ Swimming: 2017, 2018, & 2020

=== Spring ===
- Boys’ Lacrosse: 2002, 2004, 2005, 2006, 2007, 2008, 2009, 2011, and 2012
- Girls’ Lacrosse: 2007
- Girls’ Golf: 2001
- Sailing: New England Team Racing Champions 2009, Herreshoff Trophy (Women's New England Fleet Racing Championship) 2013
- Boys’ Crew: 2018, 2023
- Girls’ Crew: 2018
- Girls’ Track: 1986, 2026
- Boys’ Tennis: 1980, 1981, 1983, 1989, 1994, 2013, 2023 and 2025

== Notable alumni ==
- Peter Chandler, class of 1971, professional soccer player
- Peter Teravainen, class of 1973, former professional golfer
- Stet Howland, class of 1978, professional rock and metal drummer
- Juliana Hatfield, class of 1985, indie rock singer
- Bill Curley, class of 1990, NBA forward and Boston College athletic Hall-of-Famer
- Will Miller, class of 2002, Team USA 2012 Olympic Games, 4th in men's eight rowing
- Max Quinzani, class of 2006, MLL player
- Delby Lemieux, class of 2022, NFL center for the Minnesota Vikings

== Controversy ==
=== 1996 Duxbury High School Baseball Shoplifting Scandal ===
In 1996, the Duxbury baseball team was involved in a scandal that made national news. As described in the New York Times, "On the way home from playing a game against a town on Cape Cod, 31 members of the varsity and junior varsity squads, dressed in their uniforms, stopped at a convenience store in Sagamore Beach and helped themselves to candy bars, baseball cards and bottles of soda. Then, without paying, they sauntered out of the store and got back on the team bus with more than $100 worth of merchandise." It was eventually learned that the shoplifting spree at this particular store was an "annual tradition" of the baseball team. The team was subsequently forced to forfeit the remainder of their games and make restitution to the store owner. https://www.nytimes.com/1996/05/05/us/a-team-s-shoplifting-spree-shocks-quiet-boston-suburb.html

=== Duxbury High School Football Program ===
During a March 12, 2021 game against rival Plymouth North High School, Duxbury High School football players were heard using anti-Semitic words and potentially other derogatory language as part of their play-calling system. The incident sparked international and national attention in the weeks following its discovery and elicited public statements from virtually every party to the incident, including the Anti-Defamation League. By March 24, 2021, Head Coach Dave Maimaron had been terminated in his position at the Duxbury High School football program and placed on paid administrative leave in his position as a special education instructor at the Duxbury High School. Duxbury Public Schools Superintendent John Antonucci announced that an investigation into the etiology and pervasiveness of antisemitic or otherwise offensive language was underway and contracted to Just Training Solutions, LLC by March 24.

On June 7, 2021, the results of the investigation conducted by Just Training Solutions, LLC were submitted in a 56-page document to Superintendent John Antonucci, who summarized the report in a document made publicly available on June 10, 2021. The investigation concluded that antisemitic language and references to the Holocaust by members of the Duxbury High School football program were in violation of the School District's Vision-Values-Mission-Goals Policy, its Harassment Policy, and its Staff Conduct Policy. These violations took the form of using the words "Auschwitz," "Rabbi," and "Dreidel" to call plays at the line-of-scrimmage since 2010-2012. Additionally, the report concluded, "Coaching staff engaged in profane and vulgar language and condoned the use of profane and vulgar language by students." Finally, the report concluded that the football program violated the aforementioned School District policies in addition to the School Ceremonies and Observance Policy inasmuch as Catholic worship and prayer was integrated into the football program's preparation for competitions.

Mr. Maimaron submitted his resignation from his teaching position at Duxbury Public Schools to Superintendent Antonucci on June 7, 2021.

==== Administrative Aftermath ====
In June 2021, Duxbury High School principal Jim Donovan announced that the contract of Thom Holdgate, who has been the school's director of athletics and wellness for 19 years, would not be continued into the 2021–2022 school year.

=== Joseph Foley, et al. vs. Duxbury Public Schools, et al. ===
Joseph Parker Foley was a graduate of the Duxbury Public Schools who died of an accidental drug overdose at the age of 27 years old in October 2020. As a sixth-grade student of Duxbury Middle School in 2006, Mr. Foley's gym teacher was John Blake, a middle school physical education instruction and long-time varsity men's hockey coach.

On March 31, 2021, the estate of Mr. Foley filed a civil lawsuit in Plymouth Superior Court against the Duxbury Public Schools and John Blake, seeking $1 million in damages. In the suit, the estate of Mr. Foley alleged that Mr. Blake repeatedly sexually abused the sixth-grader, Mr. Foley, beginning in 2006 during gym class, while it named the Duxbury Public Schools as grossly negligent, reckless, and/or callously indifferent about their student, Mr. Foley's, health, welfare, and safety. Mr. Foley's subsequent drug use and accidentally lethal overdose was noted as a result of the sexual abuse he suffered as a Duxbury Middle School student at the hands of his teacher.

By April 2021, the Duxbury Public Schools terminated Mr. Blake's more-than two-decade career as an educator and coach. An independent investigation commissioned by the Duxbury School Department found that the allegations against Mr. Blake, including his sexual abuse of Mr. Foley and his sexual relationship with a colleague, were credible and in violation of the staff code of conduct.

The suit was removed to the United States District Court for the District of Massachusetts that same month, upon the petition of the school district's attorneys, Pierce Davis & Perritano LLP.

As of December 2022, Joseph Morgan, attorney for the estate of Mr. Foley, announced that plaintiffs reached a monetary settlement with the Duxbury Public Schools.
