= Jack Heneghan =

American football player (born 1996)

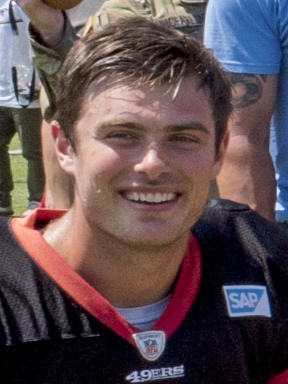
- Heneghan with the San Francisco 49ers in 2018

No. 11
- Position: Quarterback

Personal information
- Born: February 13, 1996 (age 30)
- Listed height: 6 ft 4 in (1.93 m)
- Listed weight: 224 lb (102 kg)

Career information
- High school: Menlo School (Atherton, California)
- College: Dartmouth (2014–2017)
- NFL draft: 2018: undrafted

Career history
- San Francisco 49ers (2018)*; Arizona Hotshots (2019)
- * Offseason or practice squad member only

Jack Francis Heneghan (born February 13, 1996) is an American former football quarterback. He played college football for the Dartmouth Big Green, and signed with the San Francisco 49ers as an undrafted free agent. He also played for the Arizona Hotshots of the Alliance of American Football (AAF).

== Early life ==
Jack Francis Heneghan was born on February 13, 1996. He played tight end and linebacker growing up and did not switch to quarterback until eighth grade. He played high school football at Menlo School in Atherton, California. Heneghan was the fourth-string quarterback his freshman year and made his first start as a sophomore. As a senior in 2013, he threw for 2,974 yards and 37 touchdowns before suffering a season-ending shoulder injury in the penultimate game of the regular season. For his senior year performance, Heneghan earned Peninsula Athletic League co-offensive MVP, second-team all-state small schools, and San Francisco Chronicle all-metro honors. He also played basketball in high school. He grew up a San Francisco 49ers fan.

== College career ==
Heneghan enrolled at Dartmouth College to play college football for the Dartmouth Big Green. He played for the junior varsity team in 2014, completing 64 of 90 passes for 847 yards, eight touchdowns, and one interception. Heneghan played for the varsity team from 2015 to 2017. He only appeared in two games in 2015, attempting ten passes total, as a backup to Dalyn Williams.

Heneghan took over as starter in 2016. He was benched in favor of Bruce Dixon IV for the October 29, 2016, game against Harvard due to Dartmouth's poor record in Ivy League games. However, after Dixon played poorly, Heneghan entered the game late in the first quarter and threw for over 300 yards. He played in all ten games, starting nine, completing 247 of 414 passes (59.7%) for 2,725 yards, 11 touchdowns, and 14 interceptions while also rushing 73 times for 249 yards and three touchdowns. Dartmouth finished the 2016 season with a 4–6 record.

On September 29, 2017, Heneghan completed 23 of 30 passes (a career-high 76.7%) for 199 yards and one touchdown in a last-second, 16-13 victory over Penn. He earned Ivy League Offensive Player of the Week honors. Heneghan started all ten games in 2017, recording 185 completions on 293 passing attempts (63.1%) for 2,136 yards, 17 touchdowns, and six interceptions while running 51 times for 162 yards and one touchdown. He was named honorable mention All-Ivy League for his performance during the 2017 season. Dartmouth went 8–2, tied for second place in the Ivy League.

Heneghan finished his two years as starter with 437 completions, 4,900 passing yards, and 28 passing touchdowns, the fourth most in school history in all three categories. He also tied the school record for most consecutive games with a touchdown pass with 11, and finished second in Dartmouth history with six 300-yard games. He was named Academic All-Ivy League in 2017, CoSIDA Academic All-District I First Team in 2017, and FCS ADA Academic All-Star in both 2016 and 2017. Heneghan graduated from Dartmouth with a bachelor's degree in economics.

== Professional career ==
After going undrafted in the 2018 NFL draft, Heneghan signed with the San Francisco 49ers on April 30, 2018. He received few snaps during training camp, and made his NFL debut in the preseason finale against the Los Angeles Chargers. Heneghan played most of the second half, completing eight of nine passes for 58 yards while leading the team on two touchdown drives as the 49ers lost 23–21. He also rushed twice for 17 yards, including a ten-yard first down after a bad snap. Head coach Kyle Shanahan said Heneghan deserved to play in the preseason finale after not playing in any of the other three preseason games, stating Heneghan "knows everything inside-and-out, and he’s worked as hard as anyone in learning the offense. I think the guys really respect him, just how hard he worked this offseason through OTAs and how hard he worked out in the weight room when we were away. He’s a talented guy who deserved the opportunity based on his ability also the way he handled himself." Heneghan was released on September 1, 2018, before the start of the regular season.

In November 2018, Heneghan was selected by the Arizona Hotshots of the Alliance of American Football (AAF) in the fourth round, with the 30th overall pick, of the AAF quarterback draft. He played in five games for the Hotshots during the 2019 AAF season as a backup behind John Wolford but did not record any statistics. The AAF folded after the eighth week of the regular season.

== Personal life ==
After his football career, Heneghan spent some time as an investment banker. In 2021, he joined the investment firm, Silver Lake, as a principal.

Heneghan's father, Lal Heneghan, played college football for the Penn Quakers as a tight end. Lal was also an executive in the NFL and spent five years as the 49ers' executive vice president of football administration.
