= Obum Gwacham =

Nigerian gridiron football player (born 1991)

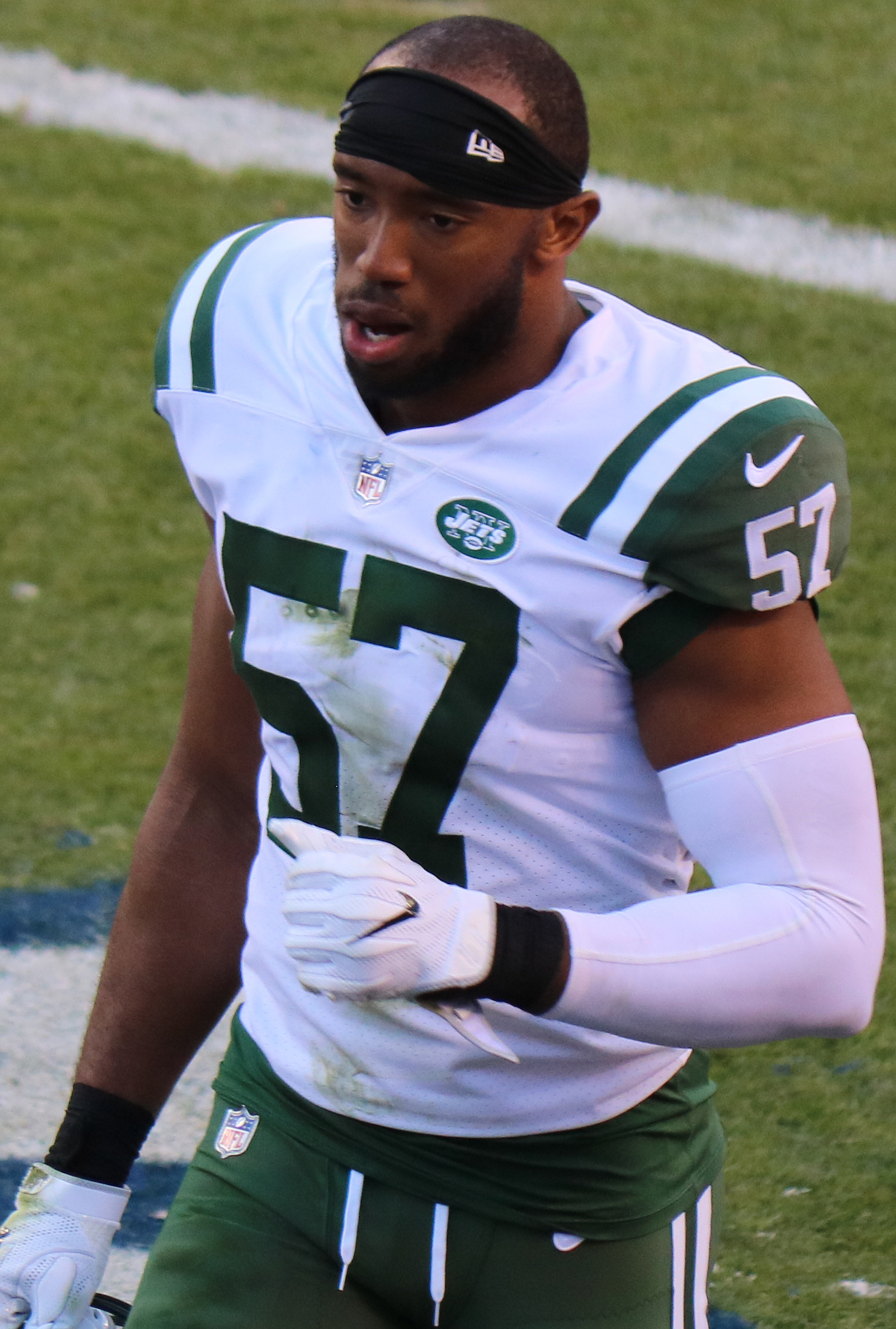
- Gwacham with the New York Jets in 2017

No. 58, 57
- Position: Defensive end

Personal information
- Born: March 20, 1991 (age 35); Onitsha, Nigeria
- Listed height: 6 ft 5 in (1.96 m)
- Listed weight: 244 lb (111 kg)

Career information
- High school: Ayala (Chino Hills, California, U.S.)
- College: Oregon State
- NFL draft: 2015: 6th round, 209th overall pick

Career history
- Seattle Seahawks (2015)*; New Orleans Saints (2015–2016); Arizona Cardinals (2017)*; New York Jets (2017); Arizona Hotshots (2019); Indianapolis Colts (2019)*; Tampa Bay Vipers (2020); BC Lions (2021–2022)
- * Offseason or practice squad member only

Career NFL statistics
- Total tackles: 10
- Sacks: 2.5
- Forced fumbles: 2
- Fumble recoveries: 1
- Stats at Pro Football Reference

Obum Gwacham (born March 20, 1991) is a Nigerian former professional gridiron football defensive end. He played college football for the Oregon State Beavers. He was a member of the Seattle Seahawks, New Orleans Saints, Arizona Cardinals, New York Jets, Arizona Hotshots, Indianapolis Colts, Tampa Bay Vipers and BC Lions.

== College career ==
Gwacham converted from wide receiver to defensive end for his senior season at Oregon State.

== Professional career ==
Pre-draft measurables
Height	Weight	Arm length	Hand span	40-yard dash	Three-cone drill	Vertical jump	Broad jump	Bench press
6 ft 5 in (1.96 m)	246 lb (112 kg)	34 in (0.86 m)	10 in (0.25 m)	4.72 s	7.28 s	36.0 in (0.91 m)	121 ft 0 in (36.88 m)	22 reps

=== Seattle Seahawks ===
On Saturday, May 2, 2015, Gwacham was selected by the Seattle Seahawks with the 209th pick in the sixth round of the 2015 NFL draft.

On September 5, 2015, he was waived by the Seahawks.

=== New Orleans Saints ===
On September 6, 2015, he was claimed off waivers by the New Orleans Saints. He was placed on injured reserve on September 28, 2016. On September 2, 2017, the Saints released Gwacham.

=== Arizona Cardinals ===
On September 4, 2017, Gwacham was signed to the practice squad of the Arizona Cardinals.

=== New York Jets ===
On October 4, 2017, Gwacham was signed by the New York Jets off the Cardinals' practice squad.

On August 31, 2018, Gwacham was waived by the Jets.

=== Arizona Hotshots ===
In 2019, Gwacham joined the Arizona Hotshots of the Alliance of American Football.

=== Indianapolis Colts ===
On June 13, 2019, Gwacham signed with the Indianapolis Colts. He was released on August 31, 2019.

=== Tampa Bay Vipers ===
Gwacham was selected by the Tampa Bay Vipers of the XFL in the 21st Round (round one of phase three) of the 2020 XFL draft. He was placed on injured reserve before the start of the season on January 21, 2020. He was activated from injured reserve on February 24, 2020. He had his contract terminated when the league suspended operations on April 10, 2020.

=== BC Lions ===
Gwacham signed with the BC Lions of the Canadian Football League on December 9, 2020. He became a free agent after the 2022 season.

== NFL career statistics ==
=== Regular season ===
Year	Team	Games		Tackles				Interceptions						Fumbles	
Year	Team	GP	GS	Comb	Solo	Ast	TFL	Sck	PD	Int	Yds	Avg	Lng	FF	FR
2015	NOR	9	0	8	7	1	2	2.5	0	0	0	0	0	1	1
2016	NOR	1	0	0	0	0	0.0	0	0	0	0	0	0	0	0
2017	NYJ	5	0	2	0	2	0	0	0	0	0	0	0	0	0
Career		15	0	10	7	3	2	2.5	0	0	0	0	0	1	1

== Personal life ==
Gwacham was born in Nigeria but moved to Chino Hills, California with his family when he was seven.
