= Andrew Lauderdale =

American football player (born 1993)

Profile
- Position: Offensive tackle

Personal information
- Born: November 22, 1993 (age 32); Concord, New Hampshire, U.S.
- Listed height: 6 ft 6 in (1.98 m)
- Listed weight: 291 lb (132 kg)

Career information
- High school: Trinity (Manchester, New Hampshire)
- College: New Hampshire
- NFL draft: 2017: undrafted

Career history
- New Orleans Saints (2017)*; San Francisco 49ers (2017–2018)*; Buffalo Bills (2018)*; Arizona Hotshots (2019); Arizona Cardinals (2019)*; Jacksonville Jaguars (2019)*; San Francisco 49ers (2019); Saskatchewan Roughriders (2021–2022)
- * Offseason or practice squad member only

Career CFL statistics
- Games played: 19
- Stats at Pro Football Reference

Andrew Lauderdale (born November 22, 1993) is an American former professional football player who was an offensive tackle for the Saskatchewan Roughriders of the Canadian Football League (CFL). He played college football for the New Hampshire Wildcats, and was signed by the New Orleans Saints as an undrafted free agent in 2017.

== Professional career ==
=== New Orleans Saints ===
Lauderdale was signed by the New Orleans Saints after going undrafted in the 2017 NFL draft. He was waived by the Saints on May 15, 2017.

=== San Francisco 49ers (first stint) ===
On June 9, 2017, Lauderdale signed a two-year contract with the San Francisco 49ers. He was waived on September 1, 2017. He was re-signed to the 49ers' practice squad on November 6, 2017. He signed a reserve/future contract with the 49ers on January 2, 2018.

On September 1, 2018, Lauderdale was waived by the 49ers.

=== Buffalo Bills ===
On December 5, 2018, Lauderdale was signed to the Buffalo Bills practice squad.

=== Arizona Hotshots ===
On January 8, 2019, Lauderdale was signed by the Arizona Hotshots of the Alliance of American Football.

=== Arizona Cardinals ===
After the AAF suspended football operations, Lauderdale signed with the Arizona Cardinals on April 8, 2019. He was waived on June 6, 2019.

=== Jacksonville Jaguars ===
On June 7, 2019, Lauderdale was claimed off waivers by the Jacksonville Jaguars. He was waived on August 11, 2019.

=== San Francisco 49ers (second stint) ===
On August 21, 2019, Lauderdale was signed by the 49ers. He was waived with an injury designation on August 31, 2019. He reverted to injured reserve the next day. He became an unrestricted free agent following the season but did not sign a contract tender.

=== Saskatchewan Roughriders ===
On January 22, 2021, Lauderdale was signed by the Saskatchewan Roughriders in the Canadian Football League (CFL). He made his CFL debut in week two of the season, replacing Brett Boyko. He injured his ankle in week 7 and missed the following two games. He was named starter prior to their week 10 matchup against the Calgary Stampeders. On October 30, 2022, Lauderdale became a free agent.
