= Robert Nelson (defensive back) =

American gridiron football (NFL) player (born 1990)

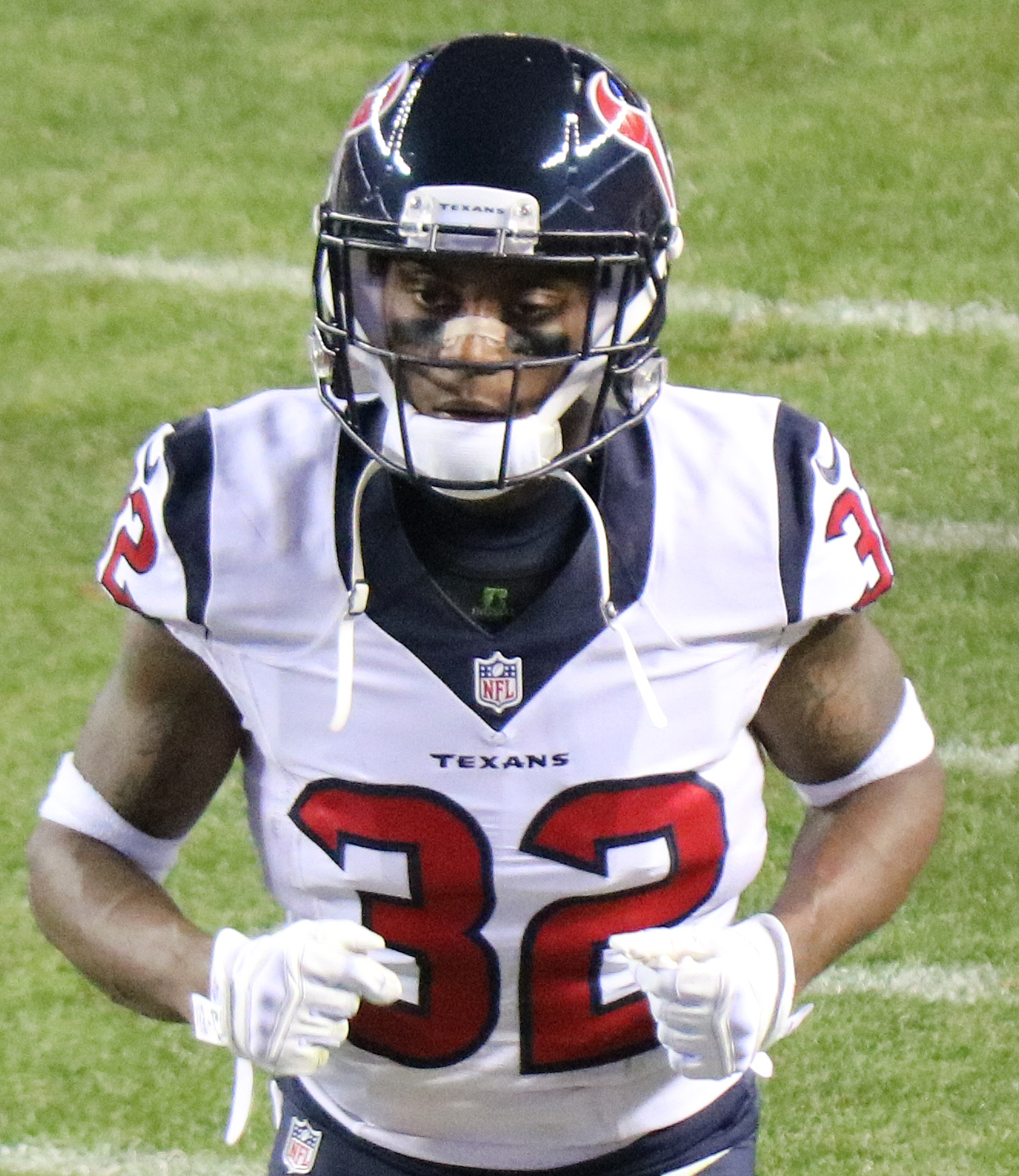
- Nelson with the Houston Texans in 2016

Profile
- Position: Cornerback

Personal information
- Born: February 16, 1990 (age 36); Tucker, Georgia, U.S.
- Listed height: 5 ft 10 in (1.78 m)
- Listed weight: 174 lb (79 kg)

Career information
- High school: North Gwinnett (Suwanee, Georgia)
- College: Arizona State
- NFL draft: 2014: undrafted

Career history
- Cleveland Browns (2014); Arizona Cardinals (2015); Houston Texans (2015–2016); New England Patriots (2017)*; New York Jets (2017); Baltimore Ravens (2017–2018)*; New Orleans Saints (2018)*; Arizona Hotshots (2019); Houston Roughnecks (2020)*; St. Louis BattleHawks (2020); Montreal Alouettes (2021)*; Arlington Renegades (2023)
- * Offseason or practice squad member only

Awards and highlights
- First-team All-Pac-12 (2013)

Career NFL statistics
- Total tackles: 24
- Fumble recoveries: 1
- Pass deflections: 2
- Interceptions: 1
- Stats at Pro Football Reference

Robert Chevis Nelson Jr. (born February 16, 1990) is an American professional football cornerback. He played college football at Louisiana–Monroe and Arizona State. He was signed by the Cleveland Browns as an undrafted free agent in 2014.

== College career ==
Nelson attended the University of Louisiana at Monroe for two years before transferring to Arizona State University. As a senior in 2013, he was a first team All-Pac-12 selection.

== Professional career ==
=== Cleveland Browns ===
Nelson was signed by the Cleveland Browns after going undrafted in the 2014 NFL draft. He was released by the Browns on September 5, 2015.

=== Arizona Cardinals ===
Nelson was signed to the Arizona Cardinals' practice squad on September 7, 2015. On November 11, 2015, he was elevated to the active roster. On December 1, 2015, he was waived.

=== Houston Texans ===
Nelson was signed to the Houston Texans's practice squad on December 30, 2015. He signed a reserve/future contract with the Texans on January 11, 2016. On September 3, 2016, he was released by the Texans and was signed to the practice squad the next day. On October 13, 2016, he was promoted to the active roster.

On September 2, 2017, Nelson was waived by the Texans.

=== New England Patriots ===
On September 20, 2017, Nelson was signed to the New England Patriots' practice squad. He was released on September 25, 2017.

=== New York Jets ===
On September 26, 2017, Nelson was signed to the New York Jets' practice squad. He was promoted to the active roster on October 24, 2017. He was waived by the Jets on December 8, 2017.

=== Baltimore Ravens ===
On December 26, 2017, Nelson was signed to the Baltimore Ravens' practice squad. He signed a reserve/future contract with the Ravens on January 11, 2018. He was waived on June 11, 2018.

=== New Orleans Saints ===
On August 11, 2018, Nelson signed with the New Orleans Saints. He was waived on September 1, 2018.

=== Arizona Hotshots ===
In late 2018, Nelson joined the Arizona Hotshots of the Alliance of American Football. In the season opener against the Salt Lake Stallions, he intercepted quarterback Josh Woodrum in the first half. The league ceased operations in April 2019.

=== Houston Roughnecks ===
Nelson was drafted in the 2nd round during phase four in the 2020 XFL Draft by the Houston Roughnecks.

=== St. Louis BattleHawks ===
Nelson was traded to the St. Louis BattleHawks in exchange for offensive lineman Juwann Bushell-Beatty and cornerback Charles James on January 21, 2020. He had his contract terminated when the league suspended operations on April 10, 2020.

=== Montreal Alouettes ===
Nelson signed with the Montreal Alouettes of the CFL on June 30, 2021. He was released on July 26, 2021.

=== Arlington Renegades ===
Nelson was selected by the Arlington Renegades in the 2023 XFL draft. He was released on August 11, 2023.

== NFL statistics ==
Regular season statistics
Year	Team	Games		Tackles				Interceptions						Fumbles	
Year	Team	GP	GS	Comb	Solo	Ast	Sck	PD	Int	Yds	Avg	Lng	TDs	FF	FR
2014	CLE	7	0	0	0	0	0.0	0	0	0	0	0	0	0	0
2016	HOU	11	0	20	17	3	0.0	2	1	0	0	0	0	0	1
2017	NYJ	2	0	4	4	0	0.0	0	0	0	0	0	0	0	0
Career		20	0	24	21	3	0	2	1	0	0	0	0	0	1

Postseason statistics
Year	Team	Games		Tackles				Interceptions						Fumbles	
Year	Team	GP	GS	Comb	Solo	Ast	Sck	PD	Int	Yds	Avg	Lng	TDs	FF	FR
2016	HOU	2	0	3	3	0	0.0	1	0	0	0	0	0	0	0
Career		2	0	3	3	0	0	1	0	0	0	0	0	0	0
