= Kaelin Burnett =

American gridiron football player (born 1989)

Profile
- Position: Linebacker

Personal information
- Born: September 6, 1989 (age 37); Los Angeles, California, U.S.
- Listed height: 6 ft 4 in (1.93 m)
- Listed weight: 240 lb (109 kg)

Career information
- High school: Lakewood (CA) Mayfair
- College: Nevada
- NFL draft: 2012: undrafted

Career history
- Oakland Raiders (2012–2014); Arizona Cardinals (2014)*; Tennessee Titans (2014); Edmonton Eskimos (2016)*; Saskatchewan Roughriders (2016); Spokane Empire (2017); Massachusetts Pirates (2018); Arizona Hotshots (2019); Houston Roughnecks (2020); Massachusetts Pirates (2023)
- * Offseason or practice squad member only

Career NFL statistics
- Total tackles: 15
- Forced fumbles: 1
- Stats at Pro Football Reference

Kaelin Bradley Burnett (born September 6, 1989) is an American football linebacker. He signed with the Oakland Raiders as an undrafted free agent in 2012. He played college football for the University of Nevada.

== Early life ==
Burnett attended Mayfair High School. He received All-Suburban League honors as a senior in 2006. He also competed in track in the hurdles and high jump.

He accepted a football scholarship from Delta State University. As a true freshman, he appeared in all 12 games, making 20 tackles, one sack and two passes defensed. He transferred at the end of the year to the University of Nevada, Reno. He sat out the 2008 season to comply with the NCAA transfer rules.

As a sophomore, he appeared in 11 games, as both an outside linebacker and defensive lineman. He collected 12 tackles, 1.5 sacks, a forced fumble and oneblocked punt.

As a junior, he appeared in all 13 regular season games on defense and special teams. He posted 30 tackles (4.5 for loss). He played in the Kraft Fight Hunger Bowl and had two sacks against Boston College.

As a senior, he was switched to defensive end. He appeared in 13 games, making 51 tackles (20 solo), 5 sacks and 11 tackles for loss. He finished his college career with 38 games, 93 tackles (41 solo), 10 sacks, one pass defensed, 3 forced fumbles and one fumble recovery.

== Professional career ==
=== Oakland Raiders ===
On September 1, 2012, he was signed to the practice squad. On November 24, 2012, he was signed from the practice squad to the active roster.

=== Arizona Cardinals ===
Burnett signed with the Arizona Cardinals practice squad on October 14, 2014.

=== Saskatchewan Roughriders ===
Burnett was signed to the Saskatchewan Roughriders' practice roster on October 25, 2016. He was promoted to the active roster on November 4, 2016.

=== Spokane Empire ===
On May 24, 2017, Burnett signed with the Spokane Empire.

He participated in The Spring League Showcase game in July 2017.

=== Massachusetts Pirates ===
On December 28, 2017, Burnett signed with the Massachusetts Pirates.

=== Arizona Hotshots ===
On January 8, 2019, Burnett signed with the Arizona Hotshots. The league ceased operations in April 2019.

=== Houston Roughnecks ===
In October 2019, Burnett was selected by the Houston Roughnecks during the open phase of the 2020 XFL draft. He had his contract terminated when the league suspended operations on April 10, 2020.

=== Massachusetts Pirates (second stint) ===
Burnett was signed by the Massachusetts Pirates on April 11, 2023.

== Personal life ==
His brother Kevin Burnett also played for the Oakland Raiders. His cousin Amir Johnson played forward in the NBA.
