= Marquis Bundy =

American gridiron football player (born 1994)

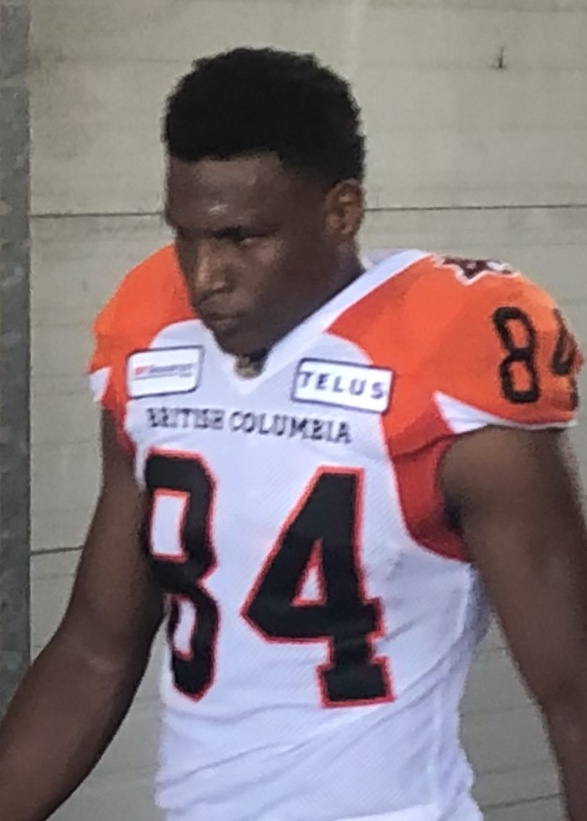
- Bundy with the BC Lions in 2019

No. 86, 84
- Position: Wide receiver

Personal information
- Born: August 5, 1994 (age 32); Phoenix, Arizona, U.S.
- Listed height: 6 ft 4 in (1.93 m)
- Listed weight: 220 lb (100 kg)

Career information
- High school: Boulder Creek (Anthem, Arizona)
- College: New Mexico
- NFL draft: 2016: undrafted

Career history
- Arizona Cardinals (2016); New York Giants (2017); Arizona Hotshots (2019); BC Lions (2019)
- Stats at Pro Football Reference

Marquis Juniel Bundy (born August 5, 1994) is an American former professional football wide receiver. He played college football at New Mexico and was signed by the Arizona Cardinals as an undrafted free agent in 2016.

== College career ==
Bundy attended the University of New Mexico from 2012 to 2015. During his four-year career at New Mexico, he caught a total of 31 passes and two touchdowns. He had his breakout year during his sophomore season in 2013, catching 19 passes and two touchdowns.

== Professional career ==
=== Pre-draft ===
With no eligibility remaining, Bundy entered the 2016 NFL draft, but was projected to go undrafted due to having minimal results in college. Although he was the starting receiver at New Mexico, he was limited to only 31 catches in his career, due to the Lobos utilizing a run-heavy based offensive scheme. Bundy was not invited to combine, but did perform very well at New Mexico's Pro Day. With his physical attributes and his workouts, he began to receive attention as a possible seventh round selection or undrafted free agent prospect. The Carolina Panthers and Arizona Cardinals showed the most interest in Bundy after his pro day workout.

Pre-draft measurables
Height	Weight	Arm length	Hand span	40-yard dash	10-yard split	20-yard split	20-yard shuttle	Three-cone drill	Vertical jump	Broad jump	Bench press
6 ft 4 1/8 in (1.93 m)	212 lb (96 kg)	32 1/8 in (0.82 m)	9 in (0.23 m)	4.49 s	1.47 s	2.52 s	4.39 s	7.12 s	32.0 in (0.81 m)	9 ft 10 in (3.00 m)	15 reps
All values from New Mexico's Pro Day

=== Arizona Cardinals ===
As expected, Bundy went undrafted in the 2016 NFL draft. On June 2, 2016, the Arizona Cardinals signed him as an undrafted free agent. He played in all four preseason games and made nine catches for 97 yards. On September 3, 2016, he was cut by the Arizona Cardinals as part of the final roster cuts. On September 13, 2016, the Cardinals signed Bundy to their practice squad after wide receiver Chris Hubert was promoted to their active roster. On November 25, 2016, Bundy was promoted to the active roster after the Cardinals released Hubert.

On August 18, 2017, Bundy was waived by the Cardinals.

=== New York Giants ===
On August 23, 2017, Bundy signed with the New York Giants. He was waived by the team on September 2, 2017, and was signed to their practice squad the next day. He was promoted to the active roster on December 27, 2017.

On September 1, 2018, Bundy was waived by the Giants.

=== Arizona Hotshots ===
In 2019, Bundy joined the Arizona Hotshots of the Alliance of American Football. During 8 games played before the league suspended operations, Bundy caught 13 passes for 178 yards. He had no touchdown receptions, but scored throughout the season on a trio of 2-point conversions.

=== BC Lions ===
After the AAF ceased operations in April 2019, Bundy signed with the BC Lions of the Canadian Football League on May 20, 2019. He was moved to the practice roster on June 9, and promoted to the active roster on July 5, 2019. He became a free agent after the 2019 season.

== Personal life ==
Bundy was born and raised in Phoenix, Arizona by his parents, Michael Bundy and Lisa Bundy, with his older brother, D'Mikel Bundy. His father played offensive lineman at the University of Arizona. He graduated with a liberal arts degree from University of New Mexico and his favorite athlete is Michael Jordan.
