= Arizona Hotshots =

Former American football franchise

Logo

General information
- Founded: 2018
- Folded: 2019
- Headquartered: Sun Devil Stadium in Tempe, Arizona
- Colors: Green, Orange and Yellow
- aaf.com/arizona-hotshots/

Personnel
- General manager: Phil Savage
- Head coach: Rick Neuheisel
- President: Scott Brubaker

Team history
- Arizona Hotshots (2019)

Home fields
- Sun Devil Stadium (2019)

League / conference affiliations
- Alliance of American Football (2019): Western Conference (2019)

The Arizona Hotshots were a professional American football franchise based in Tempe, Arizona, and one of the eight members of the Alliance of American Football (AAF), which played one season from February 2019 to April 2019. They played their home games at Sun Devil Stadium on the campus of Arizona State University. The Hotshots were one of two AAF teams based in a city that already had an NFL team (the Arizona Cardinals; the other team was the Atlanta Legends, where the NFL's Falcons are based). The Hotshots were coached by former USFL player and college head coach Rick Neuheisel. Scott Brubaker was the team president and Phil Savage was the general manager.

On April 2, 2019, the league's football operations were reportedly suspended, and on April 4 the league allowed players to leave their contracts to sign with NFL teams. The league filed for Chapter 7 bankruptcy on April 17, 2019. At the time of the bankruptcy, the Hotshots owed over $1.2 million to Arizona State University for leasing Sun Devil Stadium.

== History ==
Rick Neuheisel was announced as the head coach of the Arizona Hotshots by the Alliance of American Football on May 18, 2018. The team was slated to play at Sun Devil Stadium. By September 25, Scott Brubaker and Phil Savage were named team president and general manager, respectively.

Phoenix's name and logo were revealed on September 25, 2018, as the Arizona Hotshots along with the other three western teams. The name is a tribute to the region's firefighters, nicknamed hotshots, while the color scheme of green, orange, and yellow are commonly worn by such fire crews. The team's logo is a pair of crossed Pulaski tools, which are used by the wildland firefighters the team is named for. The branding was developed by the national office then handed off to the team staff. Reception of the name was mixed, with some arguing it "exploits the memory of the Granite Mountain Hotshots." On March 3, 2019, the team retired No. 19 to honor the 19 Granite Mountain Hotshots killed in the Yarnell Hill Fire in 2013.

On October 11, 2018, the team named Hugh Freeze as the offensive coordinator and the rest of the coaching staff. In the 2019 AAF QB Draft, the Hotshots did not protect the assigned (by geographical method) quarterback Mike Bercovici in the first round and instead selected Trevor Knight for his speed. The final 52-man roster was set on January 30.

In January 2019, the Hotshots held their preseason camp in San Antonio. They won their season opener at Sun Devil Stadium on February 10, 2019, against the Salt Lake Stallions.

== Personnel ==
=== Staff ===
Arizona Hotshots staff
| Front office: General manager – Phil Savage; Equipment Manager - Scott Rotier; Head coaches: Head coach – Rick Neuheisel; Offensive coaches: Quarterbacks – Steve Axman; Running backs – Andrew Weidinger; Wide receivers – Jennifer King; Tight ends – Charles Arbuckle; Offensive line – Chris Scelfo | Defensive coaches: Defensive coordinator – Nick Aliotti; Defensive line – Ron Aiken; Linebackers – Tim Hundley; Defensive backs – Mike Gillhamer; Defensive backs – Brandon Burton; Special teams coaches: Special teams/Wide receivers – Chris Reinert |

=== Allocation pool ===
The Hotshots owned the rights to players from designated schools:

Colleges

- Arizona
- Arizona State
- Illinois
- Nevada
- New Mexico
- New Mexico State
- Northern Arizona
- Northwestern
- Oregon State
- Texas Tech
- UCLA
- UTEP
- Wake Forest
- Washington State

The Hotshots also had rights to players unaffiliated with one of the designated schools, but who were most recently affiliated with professional teams:

National Football League (NFL)

- Arizona Cardinals
- Baltimore Ravens
- Chicago Bears
- San Francisco 49ers

Canadian Football League (CFL)

- Edmonton Eskimos

Players not affiliated with any of the designated teams could sign with any AAF team.

=== Final roster ===
2019 Arizona Hotshots final roster
| Quarterbacks: 11 Jack Heneghan; 10 Trevor Knight; 7 John Wolford; Running backs: 20 Tim Cook; 26 Jhurell Pressley; 30 Justin Stockton; Wide receivers: 13 Anthony Amos; 18 Marquis Bundy; 12 Deion Holliman; 84 Freddie Martino; 16 Richard Mullaney; 15 Rashad Ross; Tight ends: 82 Gerald Christian; 81 Thomas Duarte; 89 Connor Hamlett | Offensive linemen: 65 Josh Allen G; 77 Alex Balducci T; 79 Malcolm Bunche G; 70 Pierce Burton T; 66 Jacob Judd C; 76 Andrew Lauderdale T; 67 Patrick Lewis G; 62 Jacob Ohnesorge C; 72 Hugh Thornton G; 71 Brant Weiss T; Defensive linemen: 93 Peli Anau DE/DT; 57 Obum Gwacham DE; 94 Bunmi Rotimi DE; 90 Will Sutton DT; 54 Sione Teuhema DE; 95 Trenton Thompson DT; 98 Dylan Wynn DE/DT; 92 Rykeem Yates DE | Linebackers: 53 Steve Beauharnais OLB; 52 Carl Bradford OLB; 50 Kaelin Burnett OLB; 56 Da'Sean Downey OLB; 59 Steven Johnson MLB; 55 Nyles Morgan MLB; 51 Edmond Robinson OLB; 58 Scooby Wright MLB; Defensive backs: 24 Erick Dargan SS; 31 SaQuan Edwards CB; 28 Dexter McDougle CB; 45 Rahim Moore FS; 25 Sterling Moore CB; 21 Robert Nelson CB; 35 Shaquille Richardson CB; 37 Kieron Williams SS; Special teams: 44 James Fisher LS; 2 Nick Folk K; 9 Jeff Locke P | Reserve lists: 25 Kamari Cotton-Moya S (IR); 48 Nick Dooley LS (IR); 88 Josh Huff WR (IR); 63 Blake Muir G (IR); Rights list: Vacant; 52 Active, 4 Inactive |

== 2019 season ==
2019 Arizona Hotshots season
- General manager: Phil Savage
- Head coach: Rick Neuheisel
- Home stadium: Sun Devil Stadium

Results
- Record: 5–3
- League place: 1st (tie), Western Conference

=== Final standings ===
2019 Alliance of American Football standings
Eastern Conference
| Club | W–L | PCT | CONF | PF | PA | DIFF | SOS | SOV | STK |
|---|---|---|---|---|---|---|---|---|---|
| (x) – Orlando Apollos | 7–1 | .875 | 5–0 | 236 | 136 | 100 | .406 | .375 | W2 |
| (x) – Birmingham Iron | 5–3 | .625 | 3–2 | 165 | 133 | 32 | .406 | .300 | W1 |
| (e) – Memphis Express | 2–6 | .250 | 1–4 | 152 | 194 | -42 | .578 | .500 | L1 |
| (e) – Atlanta Legends | 2–6 | .250 | 1–4 | 88 | 213 | -125 | .609 | .438 | L3 |
Western Conference
| Club | W–L | PCT | CONF | PF | PA | DIFF | SOS | SOV | STK |
| San Antonio Commanders | 5–3 | .625 | 3–2 | 158 | 154 | 4 | .516 | .450 | L1 |
| Arizona Hotshots | 5–3 | .625 | 3–2 | 186 | 144 | 42 | .469 | .500 | W3 |
| San Diego Fleet | 3–5 | .375 | 2–3 | 158 | 161 | -3 | .469 | .417 | L3 |
| Salt Lake Stallions | 3–5 | .375 | 2–3 | 135 | 143 | -8 | .547 | .417 | W1 |
(x)–clinched playoff berth; (e)–eliminated from playoff contention

=== Schedule ===
==== Preseason ====
| Week | Date | Opponent | Result | Record | Venue |
|---|---|---|---|---|---|
| – | January 28 | at Birmingham Iron | W 37–17 | 1–0 | Alamodome |

==== Regular season ====
All times local to Tempe, as Arizona does not use daylight saving time. Arizona's year-round MST is equivalent to PDT after March 9.

| Week | Date | Opponent | Result | Record | Venue |
|---|---|---|---|---|---|
| 1 | February 10 | Salt Lake Stallions | W 38–22 | 1–0 | Sun Devil Stadium |
| 2 | February 16 | at Memphis Express | W 20–18 | 2–0 | Liberty Bowl Memorial Stadium |
| 3 | February 23 | at Salt Lake Stallions | L 15–23 | 2–1 | Rice–Eccles Stadium |
| 4 | March 3 | Atlanta Legends | L 11–14 | 2–2 | Sun Devil Stadium |
| 5 | March 10 | San Antonio Commanders | L 25–29 | 2–3 | Sun Devil Stadium |
| 6 | March 16 | at Orlando Apollos | W 22–17 | 3–3 | Spectrum Stadium |
| 7 | March 24 | San Diego Fleet | W 32–15 | 4–3 | Sun Devil Stadium |
| 8 | March 31 | at San Antonio Commanders | W 23–6 | 5–3 | Alamodome |
| 9 | April 7 | Birmingham Iron | Not played | | Sun Devil Stadium |
| 10 | April 14 | at San Diego Fleet | Not played | | SDCCU Stadium |

=== Game summaries ===
==== Week 1: Salt Lake ====
Week One: Salt Lake Stallions at Arizona Hotshots – Game summary

| Quarter | 1 | 2 | 3 | 4 | Total |
|---|---|---|---|---|---|
| Stallions | 0 | 16 | 0 | 6 | 22 |
| Hotshots | 8 | 11 | 16 | 3 | 38 |

at Sun Devil Stadium, Tempe, Arizona

- Date: February 10
- Game time: 6:00 p.m. MT
- Game attendance: 11,751
- Referee: James Carter
- TV announcers (NFL Network): Dan Hellie, Marvin Lewis, Maurice Jones-Drew
- NoExtraPoints AAF

Game information

First Quarter

- (1:03) ARIZ – John Wolford 5-yard pass to Gerald Christian (Larry Rose III rush), Hotshots 8–0

Second Quarter

- (10:28) SL – Matt Asiata 1-yard rush (Josh Woodrum rush), Tied 8–8
- (9:30) ARIZ – John Wolford 36-yard pass to Rashad Ross (Jhurell Pressley rush), Hotshots 16–8
- (3:20) ARIZ – Nick Folk 53-yard field goal, Hotshots 19–8
- (0:13) SL – Josh Woodrum 2-yard pass to Jordan Leslie (Branden Oliver rush), Hotshots 19–16

Third Quarter

- (2:52) ARIZ – John Wolford 4-yard pass to Rashad Ross (John Wolford pass to Thomas Duarte), Hotshots 27–16
- (2:36) ARIZ – John Wolford 30-yard pass to Jhurell Pressley (John Wolford pass to Richard Mullaney), Hotshots 35–16

Fourth Quarter

- (11:37) SL – Matt Linehan 7-yard pass to Nick Truesdell (pass failed), Hotshots 35–22
- (6:07) ARIZ – Nick Folk 32-yard field goal, Hotshots 38–22

Top Passers

- SL – Josh Woodrum – 10/22, 103 yards, 1 TD, 1 INT
- ARIZ – John Wolford – 18/29, 275 yards, 4 TD

Top Rushers

- SL – Branden Oliver – 8 carries, 40 yards
- ARIZ – Jhurell Pressley – 18 carries, 64 yards

Top Receivers

- SL – Anthony Denham – 5 receptions, 59 yards
- ARIZ – Rashad Ross – 5 receptions, 103 yards, 2 TD

==== Week 2: at Memphis ====
Week Two: Arizona Hotshots at Memphis Express – Game summary

| Quarter | 1 | 2 | 3 | 4 | Total |
|---|---|---|---|---|---|
| Hotshots | 0 | 0 | 6 | 14 | 20 |
| Express | 9 | 3 | 0 | 6 | 18 |

at Liberty Bowl Memorial Stadium, Memphis, Tennessee

- Date: February 16
- Game time: 6:00 p.m. MT
- Game attendance: 11,980
- Referee: Reggie Smith
- TV announcers (NFL Network): Dan Hellie, Brian Billick, Mike Smith, and Jenny Dell
- NoExtraPoints AAF

Game information

First Quarter

- (8:03) MEM – Josh Jasper 38-yard field goal, Express 3–0
- (5:37) MEM – Zac Stacy 9-yard rush (rush failed), Express 9–0

Second Quarter

- (8:36) MEM – Josh Jasper 35-yard field goal, Express 12–0

Third Quarter

- (1:06) ARIZ – John Wolford 16-yard pass to Rashad Ross (pass failed), Express 12–6

Fourth Quarter

- (13:39) MEM – Christian Hackenberg 4-yard rush (pass failed), Express 18–6
- (11:31) ARIZ – Justin Stockton 45-yard rush (John Wolford rush), Express 18–14
- (7:07) ARIZ – John Wolford 4-yard pass to Tim Cook (pass failed), Hotshots 20–18

Top Passers

- ARIZ – John Wolford – 14/22, 194 yards, 2 TD, 2 INT
- MEM – Christian Hackenberg – 14/25, 102 yards

Top Rushers

- ARIZ – Tim Cook – 13 carries, 73 yards
- MEM – Zac Stacy – 19 carries, 101 yards, 1 TD

Top Receivers

- ARIZ – Josh Huff – 2 receptions, 84 yards
- MEM – Reece Horn – 5 receptions, 56 yards

==== Week 3: at Salt Lake ====
Week Three: Arizona Hotshots at Salt Lake Stallions – Game summary

| Quarter | 1 | 2 | 3 | 4 | Total |
|---|---|---|---|---|---|
| Hotshots | 0 | 9 | 3 | 3 | 15 |
| Stallions | 3 | 6 | 6 | 8 | 23 |

at Rice–Eccles Stadium, Salt Lake City, Utah

- Date: February 23
- Game time: 1:00 p.m. MT
- Game attendance: 10,412
- Referee: John O'Neill
- TV announcers (B/R Live): Mark Malone, Maurice Jones-Drew, Shaun O'Hara
- NoExtraPoints AAF

Game information

First Quarter

- (9:14) SL – Taylor Bertolet 54-yard field goal, Stallions 3–0

Second Quarter

- (11:32) SL – Josh Woodrum 25-yard pass to De'Mornay Pierson-El (pass failed), Stallions 9–0
- (6:03) ARIZ – Nick Folk 48-yard field goal, Stallions 9–3
- (0:21) ARIZ – John Wolford 1-yard pass to Rashad Ross (rush failed), Tied 9–9

Third Quarter

- (13:51) SL – Branden Oliver 1-yard rush (pass failed), Stallions 15–9
- (0:49) ARIZ – Nick Folk 35-yard field goal, Stallions 15–12

Fourth Quarter

- (7:24) SL – Joel Bouagnon 1-yard rush (Josh Woodrum pass to De'Mornay Pierson-El), Stallions 23–12
- (0:19) ARIZ – Nick Folk 45-yard field goal, Stallions 23–15

Top Passers

- ARIZ – John Wolford – 14/22, 127 yards, 1 TD, 1 INT
- SL – Josh Woodrum – 22/31, 178 yards, 1 TD

Top Rushers

- ARIZ – Jhurell Pressley – 10 carries, 34 yards
- SL – Joel Bouagnon – 12 carries, 45 yards, 1 TD

Top Receivers

- ARIZ – Rashad Ross – 6 receptions, 51 yards, 1 TD
- SL – De'Mornay Pierson-El – 8 receptions, 90 yards, 1 TD

==== Week 4: Atlanta ====
Week Four: Atlanta Legends at Arizona Hotshots – Game summary

| Quarter | 1 | 2 | 3 | 4 | Total |
|---|---|---|---|---|---|
| Legends | 2 | 6 | 0 | 6 | 14 |
| Hotshots | 0 | 3 | 0 | 8 | 11 |

at Sun Devil Stadium, Tempe, Arizona

- Date: March 3
- Game time: 6:00 p.m. MT
- Game weather: Partly cloudy • Temperature: 74 °F (23 °C) • Wind: 5–10 mph
- Game attendance: 8,865
- Referee: Jeff Heaser
- TV announcers (NFL Network): Andrew Siciliano, Marvin Lewis, Shaun O'Hara
- NoExtraPoints AAF

Game information

First Quarter

- (0:26) ATL – Rashad Ross tackled in end zone by Ed Reynolds for a safety, Legends 2–0

Second Quarter

- (1:49) ATL – Denard Robinson 9-yard rush (pass failed), Legends 8–0
- (0:00) ARIZ – Nick Folk 39-yard field goal, Legends 8–3

Third Quarter
No scoring plays
Fourth Quarter

- (13:34) ATL – Younghoe Koo 27-yard field goal, Legends 11–3
- (5:20) ARIZ – John Wolford 20-yard pass to Rashad Ross (John Wolford pass to Marquis Bundy), Tied 11–11
- (1:03) ATL – Younghoe Koo 33-yard field goal, Legends 14–11

Top Passers

- ATL – Aaron Murray – 20/33, 254 yards
- ARIZ – John Wolford – 17/31, 185 yards, 1 TD

Top Rushers

- ATL – Aaron Murray – 7 carries, 54 yards
- ARIZ – Jhurell Pressley – 14 carries, 110 yards

Top Receivers

- ATL – Tarean Folston – 5 receptions, 66 yards
- ARIZ – Rashad Ross – 4 receptions, 74 yards, 1 TD

==== Week 5: San Antonio ====
Week Five: San Antonio Commanders at Arizona Hotshots – Game summary

| Quarter | 1 | 2 | 3 | 4 | Total |
|---|---|---|---|---|---|
| Commanders | 14 | 12 | 0 | 3 | 29 |
| Hotshots | 0 | 0 | 8 | 17 | 25 |

at Sun Devil Stadium, Tempe, Arizona

- Date: March 10
- Game time: 5:00 p.m. MST/PDT
- Game attendance: 9,351
- Referee: Brandon Cruse
- TV announcers (NFL Network): Matt "Money" Smith, Marvin Lewis
- NoExtraPoints AAF

Game information

First Quarter

- (12:07) SA – Derron Smith 66-yard interception return (pass failed), Commanders 6–0
- (4:58) SA – Logan Woodside 54-yard pass to Mekale McKay (Logan Woodside rush), Commanders 14–0

Second Quarter

- (12:19) SA – Kenneth Farrow 1-yard rush (rush failed), Commanders 20–0
- (3:36) SA – Logan Woodside 5-yard pass to Stehly Reden (pass failed), Commanders 26–0

Third Quarter

- (5:31) ARIZ – John Wolford 45-yard pass to Rashad Ross (John Wolford rush), Commanders 26–8

Fourth Quarter

- (13:04) ARIZ – Nick Folk 23-yard field goal, Commanders 26–11
- (7:52) SA – Nick Rose 21-yard field goal, Commanders 29–11
- (3:30) ARIZ – John Wolford 4-yard pass to Thomas Duarte (John Wolford pass to Rashad Ross), Commanders 29–19
- (1:20) ARIZ – Tim Cook 1-yard rush (rush failed), Commanders 29–25

Top Passers

- SA – Logan Woodside – 21/27, 290 yards, 2 TD, 1 INT
- ARIZ – John Wolford – 19/33, 246 yards, 2 TD, 3 INT

Top Rushers

- SA – Kenneth Farrow – 12 carries, 25 yards, 1 TD
- ARIZ – Tim Cook – 12 carries, 33 yards, 1 TD

Top Receivers

- SA – Mekale McKay – 5 receptions, 91 yards, 1 TD
- ARIZ – Rashad Ross – 5 receptions, 106 yards, 1 TD

==== Week 6: at Orlando ====
Week Six: Arizona Hotshots at Orlando Apollos – Game summary

| Quarter | 1 | 2 | 3 | 4 | Total |
|---|---|---|---|---|---|
| Hotshots | 3 | 11 | 0 | 8 | 22 |
| Apollos | 6 | 3 | 0 | 8 | 17 |

at Spectrum Stadium, Orlando, Florida

- Date: March 16
- Game time: 5:00 p.m. MST/PDT
- Game attendance: 18,358
- Referee: Tra Blake
- TV announcers (NFL Network): Dan Hellie, Shaun O'Hara, Jason Fisher
- NoExtraPoints AAF

Game information

First Quarter

- (8:13) ORL – Garrett Gilbert 5-yard pass to Charles Johnson (pass failed), Apollos 6–0
- (4:54) ARIZ – Nick Folk 55-yard field goal, Apollos 6–3

Second Quarter

- (14:12) ARIZ – Nick Folk 53-yard field goal, Tied 6–6
- (10:43) ORL – Elliott Fry 44-yard field goal, Apollos 9–6
- (4:32) ARIZ – John Wolford 9-yard pass to Jhurell Pressley (John Wolford rush), Hotshots 14–9

Third Quarter
No scoring plays
Fourth Quarter

- (9:45) ORL – Garrett Gilbert 17-yard pass to Jalin Marshall (Garrett Gilbert pass to Akeem Hunt), Apollos 17–14
- (5:17) ARIZ – Jhurell Pressley 1-yard rush (John Wolford pass to Marquis Bundy), Hotshots 22–17

Top Passers

- ARIZ – John Wolford – 16/27, 162 yards, 1 TD
- ORL – Garrett Gilbert – 23/48, 268 yards, 2 TD, 1 INT

Top Rushers

- ARIZ – Tim Cook – 11 carries, 71 yards
- ORL – D'Ernest Johnson – 9 carries, 43 yards

Top Receivers

- ARIZ – Richard Mullaney – 6 receptions, 73 yards
- ORL – Jalin Marshall – 6 receptions, 98 yards, 1 TD

In an upset, the Hotshots beat the Apollos to ruin their chances at a perfect season. (They fall to 5–1) With the win, they improve to 3–3.

==== Week 7: San Diego ====
Week Seven: San Diego Fleet at Arizona Hotshots – Game summary

| Quarter | 1 | 2 | 3 | 4 | Total |
|---|---|---|---|---|---|
| Fleet | 9 | 6 | 0 | 0 | 15 |
| Hotshots | 9 | 14 | 0 | 9 | 32 |

at Sun Devil Stadium, Tempe, Arizona

- Date: March 24
- Game time: 1:00 p.m. MST/PDT
- Game weather: Sunny • Temperature: 77 °F (25 °C) • Wind: 2–4 mph
- Game attendance: 9,760
- Referee: Reggie Smith
- TV announcers (CBS Sports Network): Ben Holden, Adam Archuleta, Melanie Collins
- NoExtraPoints AAF

Game information

First Quarter

- (11:03) SD – Terrell Watson 3-yard rush (pass failed), Fleet 6–0
- (6:55) ARIZ – Trevor Knight 7-yard rush (rush failed), Tied 6–6
- (2:31) SD – Donny Hageman 47-yard field goal, Fleet 9–6
- (0:32) ARIZ – Nick Folk 54-yard field goal, Tied 9–9

Second Quarter

- (6:27) ARIZ – John Wolford 36-yard pass to Thomas Duarte (Richard Mullaney pass to Marquis Bundy), Hotshots 17–9
- (2:19) ARIZ – John Wolford 15-yard pass to Deion Holliman (pass failed), Hotshots 23–9
- (0:07) SD – Mike Bercovici 38-yard pass to Marcus Baugh (pass failed), Hotshots 23–15

Third Quarter
No scoring plays
Fourth Quarter

- (6:08) ARIZ – John Wolford 35-yard rush (pass failed), Hotshots 29–15
- (3:52) ARIZ – Nick Folk 20-yard field goal, Hotshots 32–15

Top Passers

- SD – Mike Bercovici – 22/43, 310 yards, 1 TD, 2 INT
- ARIZ – John Wolford – 15/19, 212 yards, 2 TD, 1 INT

Top Rushers

- SD – Bishop Sankey – 12 carries, 54 yards
- ARIZ – Jhurell Pressley – 15 carries, 64 yards

Top Receivers

- SD – Nelson Spruce – 12 receptions, 146 yards
- ARIZ – Rashad Ross – 3 receptions, 53 yards

==== Week 8: at San Antonio ====
Week Eight: Arizona Hotshots at San Antonio Commanders – Game summary

| Quarter | 1 | 2 | 3 | 4 | Total |
|---|---|---|---|---|---|
| Hotshots | 6 | 9 | 0 | 8 | 23 |
| Commanders | 0 | 3 | 3 | 0 | 6 |

at Alamodome, San Antonio, Texas

- Date: March 31
- Game time: 5:00 p.m. MST/PDT
- Game weather: Indoors
- Game attendance: 23,504
- Referee: Tra Blake
- TV announcers (NFL Network): Matt "Money" Smith, Marvin Lewis
- NoExtraPoints AAF

Game information

First Quarter

- (9:18) ARIZ – John Wolford 58-yard pass to Rashad Ross (pass failed), Hotshots 6–0

Second Quarter

- (14:06) ARIZ – Nick Folk 25-yard field goal, Hotshots 9–0
- (6:56) ARIZ – Tim Cook 6-yard rush (pass failed), Hotshots 15–0
- (0:47) SA – Nick Rose 54-yard field goal, Hotshots 15–3

Third Quarter

- (9:16) SA – Nick Rose 35-yard field goal, Hotshots 15–6

Fourth Quarter

- (4:10) ARIZ – Tim Cook 20-yard rush (John Wolford pass to Connor Hamlett), Hotshots 23–6

Top Passers

- ARIZ – John Wolford – 17/23, 216 yards, 1 TD
- SA – Marquise Williams – 17/23, 130 yards

Top Rushers

- ARIZ – Justin Stockton – 4 carries, 34 yards
- SA – David Cobb – 9 carries, 59 yards

Top Receivers

- ARIZ – Rashad Ross – 4 receptions, 78 yards, 1 TD
- SA – Greg Ward Jr. – 5 receptions, 48 yards

== Media ==
In addition to league-wide television coverage through NFL Network, CBS Sports Network, TNT, and B/R Live, Hotshots' games were also broadcast on local radio by KDUS, an NBC Sports Radio affiliate.
