= Delby Lemieux =

American football player (born 2003)

Profile
- Position: Center

Personal information
- Born: November 6, 2003 (age 23)
- Listed height: 6 ft 5 in (1.96 m)
- Listed weight: 305 lb (138 kg)

Career information
- High school: Duxbury (Duxbury, Massachusetts)
- College: Dartmouth (2022–2025)
- NFL draft: 2026: undrafted

Career history
- Minnesota Vikings (2026)*
- * Offseason or practice squad member only

Awards and highlights
- First-team FCS All-American (2025); 2× First-team All-Ivy League (2024, 2025)

Delby Lemieux (born November 6, 2003) is an American professional football center. He played college football for the Dartmouth Big Green and he was signed as an undrafted free agent by the Minnesota Vikings in 2026.

== Early life ==
Lemieux attended Duxbury High School in Duxbury, Massachusetts, and committed to play college football for the Dartmouth Big Green.

== College career ==
From 2022 to 2025, Lemieux played in 35 games with 27 starts at left and right tackle. He earned two first-team all-conference honors in 2024 and 2025, and he was named a FCS first-team all-American in 2025. After his senior season in 2025, he declared for the 2026 NFL draft, while also accepting an invite to participate in the 2026 Senior Bowl. Heading into the draft, Lemieux switched from offensive tackle to center.

== Professional career ==
Pre-draft measurables
Height	Weight	Arm length	Hand span	Wingspan	40-yard dash	10-yard split	20-yard split	20-yard shuttle	Three-cone drill	Vertical jump	Broad jump	Bench press
6 ft 5 in (1.96 m)	309 lb (140 kg)	31 3/8 in (0.80 m)	8 7/8 in (0.23 m)	6 ft 5 7/8 in (1.98 m)	5.04 s	1.71 s	2.84 s	4.79 s	7.52 s	26.0 in (0.66 m)	8 ft 9 in (2.67 m)	25 reps
All values from Pro Day

Lemieux was signed as an undrafted free agent by the Minnesota Vikings after the conclusion of the 2026 NFL draft. On August 30, 2026, he was waived by the Vikings as a part of final roster cuts.
