= John Wolford =

American football player (born 1995)

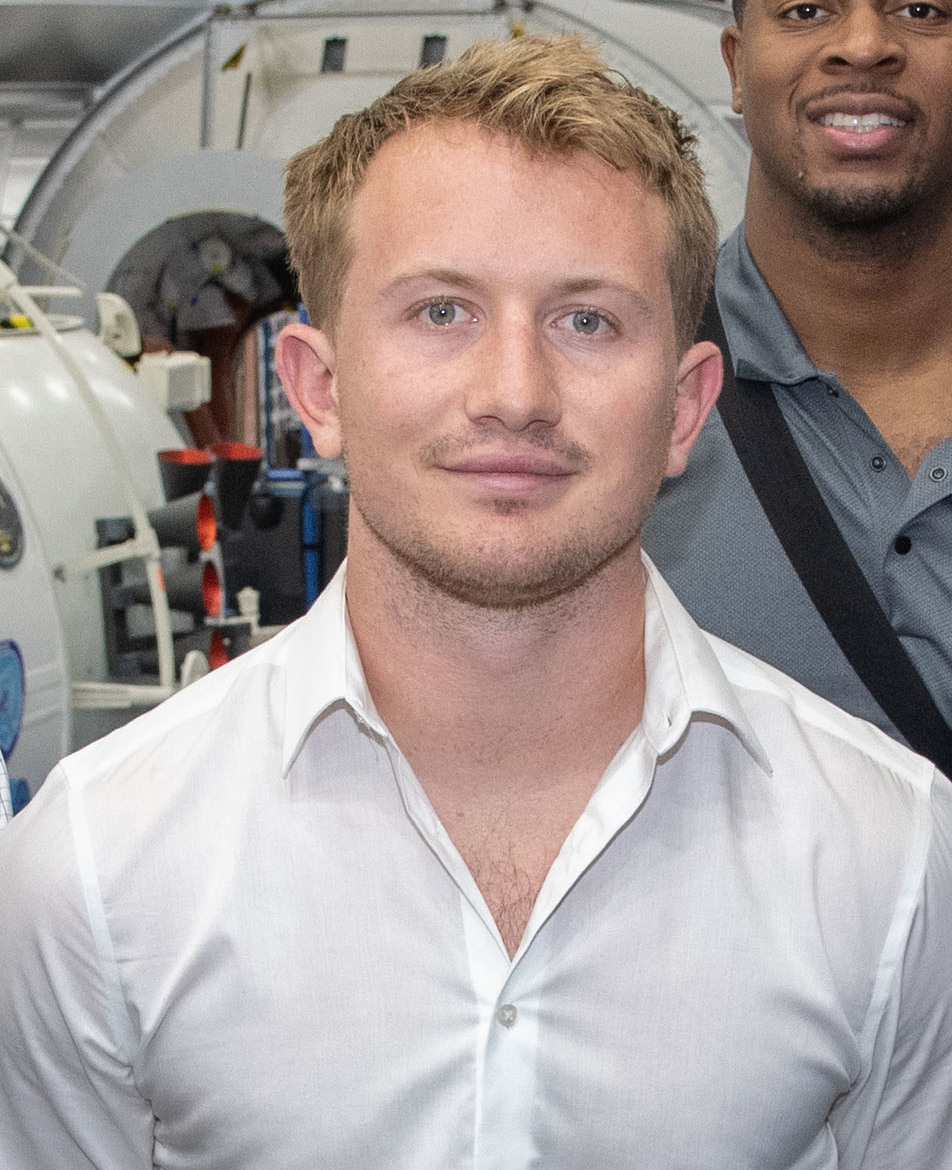
- Wolford in 2020

Profile
- Position: Quarterback

Personal information
- Born: October 16, 1995 (age 31); Dallas, Texas, U.S.
- Listed height: 6 ft 1 in (1.85 m)
- Listed weight: 218 lb (99 kg)

Career information
- High school: Bishop Kenny (Jacksonville, Florida)
- College: Wake Forest (2014–2017)
- NFL draft: 2018: undrafted

Career history
- New York Jets (2018)*; Arizona Hotshots (2019); Los Angeles Rams (2019–2022); Tampa Bay Buccaneers (2023); Jacksonville Jaguars (2024); Minnesota Vikings (2025)
- * Offseason or practice squad member only

Awards and highlights
- Super Bowl champion (LVI); AAF passing touchdowns leader (2019); Second-team All-ACC (2017)

Career NFL statistics as of 2025
- Passing attempts: 104
- Passing completions: 61
- Completion percentage: 58.7%
- TD–INT: 1–5
- Passing yards: 626
- Passer rating: 59.2
- Stats at Pro Football Reference

John Thomas Wolford (born October 16, 1995) is an American professional football quarterback. He played college football for the Wake Forest Demon Deacons and signed with the New York Jets of the National Football League (NFL) as an undrafted free agent in 2018. Wolford played for the Los Angeles Rams from 2019 to 2022, and has also played for the Tampa Bay Buccaneers, the Jacksonville Jaguars, the Minnesota Vikings, and the Arizona Hotshots of the Alliance of American Football.

== Early life ==
Wolford was born in Dallas, Texas, and moved to Jacksonville at an early age where he attended Bishop Kenny High School. As a pro-style quarterback, he was rated a three-star recruit by Rivals.com and ESPN and committed to play college football for the Wake Forest Demon Deacons. He was briefly the all-time leader in all major statistical passing categories for high school football in the state of Florida.

== College career ==
Wolford started his college career as the first Wake Forest player to start all 12 games as a true freshman, setting school records in attempts, passing yards, touchdowns, and completion percentage by a true freshman. He struggled at times, throwing 13 interceptions in his first eight games, but showed improvement over the year, throwing only one interception in the final four. He finished eighth in the Atlantic Coast Conference (ACC) in passing yards per game at 169.8, ranking second among freshmen in the conference behind only Miami's Brad Kaaya.

He had another strong year as a sophomore. In the first game of the season, he threw for a career-high 323 yards in a 41–3 win over Elon; the next week, he threw for 373 yards in a 30–17 loss vs. Syracuse. His 696 passing yards in the first two games constituted the best start ever by a Wake Forest quarterback. As a junior, he started 11 of 13 games, missing one game due to injury.

As a senior, he had the most impressive season of his college career, earning second-team all-ACC honors and setting school records in single-season passer rating, passing yards, touchdown passes, total offense yards, and touchdowns, as well as the school record in career touchdowns. In the Belk Bowl, he set school bowl game records in completions (32), attempts (49), passing yards (400), and touchdowns (4), becoming the first FBS player since 2000 to pass for 400+ yards, rush for 65+ yards, and throw no interceptions in a bowl game.

== Professional career ==
Pre-draft measurables
Height	Weight	Arm length	Hand span	40-yard dash	10-yard split	20-yard split	20-yard shuttle	Three-cone drill	Vertical jump	Broad jump
5 ft 11 1/2 in (1.82 m)	205 lb (93 kg)	29 1/8 in (0.74 m)	9 5/8 in (0.24 m)	4.77 s	1.70 s	2.76 s	4.18 s	6.78 s	31 in (0.79 m)	9 ft 1 in (2.77 m)
All values from 2018 Wake Forest Pro Day

=== New York Jets ===
After going undrafted in the 2018 NFL draft, Wolford signed as an undrafted free agent with the New York Jets. He played in most of the preseason finale against the Philadelphia Eagles, completing 8-of-20 pass attempts for 89 yards and an interception. He was waived on September 2, 2018 and signed to the practice squad the next day. On September 4, he was released from the practice squad to make room for former New York Giants quarterback Davis Webb.

=== Arizona Hotshots ===
The Arizona Hotshots drafted Wolford with their second-round pick in the 2019 AAF QB Draft. He entered the preseason competing with first-round pick Trevor Knight for the starting job; in the Hotshots' sole preseason game against the Birmingham Iron, Wolford completed 9-of-14 passes for 116 yards, a touchdown, and a two-point conversion. He was named starter prior to the regular season.

In the first game of the regular season, a 38–22 win over the Salt Lake Stallions, Wolford completed 18-of-29 passes for 275 yards, four touchdowns, and two two-point conversions; for his performance, he was named Week 1 AAF Offensive Player of the Week. He earned a second Player of the Week award in Week 7, when he completed 15-of-19 passes for 212 yards, two touchdowns, one interception, and a 126.3 passer rating. He also ran for a 35-yard touchdown in a 32–15 victory against the San Diego Fleet.

=== Los Angeles Rams ===
On April 10, 2019, Wolford signed with the Los Angeles Rams of the NFL after the AAF suspended operations. He was waived during final roster cuts on August 31, but was signed the next day to the Rams' practice squad. He signed a reserve/future contract with the Rams on December 31.

On December 28, 2020, following an injury to starter Jared Goff in a Week 16 game against the Seattle Seahawks, Rams' coach Sean McVay confirmed that Wolford would start the final game of the regular season against the Arizona Cardinals. Wolford would become the first quarterback since 2013 to make his first start with a team during Week 17 with a playoff berth on the line (Kyle Orton with the Dallas Cowboys). After throwing an interception to Cardinals' linebacker Jordan Hicks on his first pass attempt of the game, Wolford quickly turned things around, completing 22-of-38 passes for 231 yards while also rushing six times for 56 yards; the Rams went on to beat the Cardinals 18–7 to clinch a playoff berth. He became the first quarterback to pass for 200+ yards and rush for 50+ yards in an NFL debut. Wolford started for the Rams in the Wild Card playoff game at the Seahawks, but left in the first quarter with a neck injury after sustaining a shoulder-to-helmet hit from Seahawks' safety Jamal Adams. He was taken to the hospital and was later released the same day. Wolford completed 3-of-6 passes for 29 yards prior to leaving the game, which the Rams went on to win 30–20. The Rams would end their postseason in a loss to the Packers the following week.

In 2021, Wolford served as the backup for newly acquired quarterback Matthew Stafford. Wolford also remained the backup during the Rams' playoff run, winning Super Bowl LVI 23–20 where they defeated the Cincinnati Bengals.

On November 13, 2022, Wolford was named the starting quarterback for Week 10 against the Cardinals after Stafford was placed in concussion protocol. Coincidentally, Cardinals' starting quarterback Kyler Murray also missed the game due to injury, with Colt McCoy serving as the starter in a backup versus backup matchup.

=== Tampa Bay Buccaneers ===
On May 9, 2023, Wolford signed with the Tampa Bay Buccaneers. He was released on August 29 and re-signed to the practice squad the following day. Wolford was promoted to the active roster on October 31.

Wolford re-signed with the Buccaneers on March 15, 2024. He was released during final roster cuts on August 27.

=== Jacksonville Jaguars ===
On December 3, 2024, Wolford signed with the Jacksonville Jaguars' practice squad. On February 17, 2025, Wolford was signed to the active roster.

On August 25, Wolford was released by the Jaguars as part of final roster cuts.

=== Minnesota Vikings ===
On October 29, 2025, the Minnesota Vikings signed Wolford to their practice squad, in need of an additional veteran quarterback to replace Carson Wentz, who suffered what would eventually become a season-ending injury on October 5 against the Cleveland Browns. He was promoted to the active roster on December 6.

== Career statistics ==
=== College ===
Season	Team	Games			Passing								Rushing			
Season	Team	GP	GS	Record	Comp	Att	Pct	Yards	Avg	TD	Int	Rate	Att	Yards	Avg	TD
2014	Wake Forest	**12**	**12**	3–9	214	367	58.3	2,037	5.6	12	**14**	108.1	104	-151	-1.5	0
2015	Wake Forest	11	10	3–7	142	235	60.4	1,791	7.6	9	11	127.7	73	67	0.9	3
2016	Wake Forest	**12**	11	6–5	166	299	55.5	1,774	5.9	9	10	108.6	130	521	4.0	6
2017	Wake Forest	**12**	**12**	**8–4**	**239**	**374**	**63.9**	**3,192**	**8.5**	**29**	9	**158.0**	**140**	**683**	**4.9**	**10**
Career		47	45	20−25	761	1,275	59.7	8,794	6.9	59	41	126.5	447	1,120	2.5	19

=== AAF ===
Year	Team	Games			Passing									Rushing					Sacks		Fum
Year	Team	GP	GS	Record	Cmp	Att	Pct	Yds	Y/A	Lng	TD	Int	Rtg	Att	Yds	Y/A	Lng	TD	Sck	Yds	Fum
2019	ARI	8	7	5–2	130	205	63.4	1,616	7.9	64	14	7	96.3	36	160	4.4	35	1	14	88	1
Career		8	7	5–2	130	205	63.4	1,616	7.9	64	14	7	96.3	36	160	4.4	35	1	14	88	1

Legend
	Won the Super Bowl
**Bold**	Career high

=== NFL ===
==== Regular season ====
Year	Team	Games			Passing									Rushing					Sacks		Fumbles	
Year	Team	GP	GS	Record	Cmp	Att	Pct	Yds	Y/A	Lng	TD	Int	Rtg	Att	Yds	Y/A	Lng	TD	Sck	Yds	Fum	Lost
2020	LAR	1	1	**1–0**	22	38	57.9	231	6.1	**38**	0	1	**64.7**	6	**56**	**9.3**	**14**	0	2	8	0	0
2021	LAR	**3**	0	—	1	4	25.0	5	1.3	5	0	1	0.0	2	-1	-0.5	0	0	1	8	0	0
2022	LAR	**3**	**3**	1–2	**38**	**62**	**61.3**	**390**	**6.3**	30	**1**	**3**	64.6	**8**	32	4.0	**14**	0	**7**	**49**	**3**	**1**
2023	TB	0	0	—	DNP																	
2025	MIN	0	0	—	DNP																	
Career		7	4	2–2	61	104	58.7	626	6.0	38	1	5	59.2	16	87	5.4	14	0	10	65	3	1

==== Postseason ====
Year	Team	Games			Passing									Rushing					Sacks		Fumbles	
Year	Team	GP	GS	Record	Cmp	Att	Pct	Yds	Y/A	Lng	TD	Int	Rtg	Att	Yds	Y/A	Lng	TD	Sck	Yds	Fum	Lost
2020	LAR	1	1	1–0	3	6	50.0	29	4.8	15	0	0	63.9	1	2	2.0	2	0	1	0	0	0
2021	LAR	0	0	—	DNP																	
2023	TB	0	0	—	DNP																	
Career		1	1	1–0	3	6	50.0	29	4.8	15	0	0	63.9	1	2	2.0	2	0	1	0	0	0

== Career highlights ==
NFL

- Super Bowl champion (LVI)
- First quarterback in NFL history to pass for 200+ yards and rush for 50+ yards in an NFL debut.

AAF

- AAF passing touchdowns leader (2019)

College

- Second-team All-ACC (2017)

== Personal life ==
Wolford's uncle, Will Wolford, was a three-time Pro Bowl offensive tackle who played 13 seasons in the NFL.
