= Visitation of England and Wales =

Book series of family genealogy

Visitation of England and Wales is a 34-volume book series of pedigree charts and family trees of British families. The editors were Joseph Jackson Howard, the Maltravers Herald of Arms Extraordinary, who died in 1902, and Frederick Arthur Crisp who continued the series after his death, until 1921. The volumes were illustrated with "all the arms on record at the Heralds' College, as well as reproductions of autographs, seals, book-plates and portraits"; with the pedigrees "beginning with the grandparents of the representative of the family". Another review commented on "place and date of each birth, marriage and death, and often details of a career only to be found in specially-written biographies". Crisp published these and other works of interest to genealogists through Grove Park Press in London, his private press.

== Main series volumes ==
Volume number	Publication date	Internet Archive links	Other full-text links	Pedigree list
1	1893			List of Pedigrees Amphlett - Armytage - Assheton - Attree - Bacchus - Bagshawe - Bainbrigge - Bartlett - Barton - Bentley - Blaydes - Bloom - Boddington - Bradney - Bree - Brooke - Brown - Bushe - Byrth - Cass - Cavendish - Clay - Colby - Cole - Collier - Conder - Crowfoot - Cullum - Curtois - Dew - Dicker - Dickinson - Du Moulin Browne - Eales - Edwards - Emeris - Eshelby - Ewen - Faber - Flavel - Flory - Foljambe - Gale - Grubbe - Guille - Hales - Harvey - Hesketh - Hext - Hoblyn - Hooper - Howard - Howe - James - Jodrell - Johnson - Jones - Leveson Gower - Littledale - Mant - Methold - Milner Gibson - Minet - Molyneux - Olive - Oliver - Parker - Paull - Perrott - Platt-Higgins - Plumer - Pilkington - Porter - Prentice - Prior - Pritchett - Ricketts - Roots - Ryland - Rylands - Schomberg - Shann - Smith-Bosanquet - Sparrow - St. George - Sterry - Stone - Swann - Tempest - Tolhurst - Tudsbery Turner - Watney - Wickham - Williams - Wilson - Worthington
2	1894	,		List of Pedigrees Battye-Trevor of Tingrith House - Bellasis - Bright of Liverpool - Britton of Bristol - Brown - Buckler - Carlton of Truro - Christie of Glyndebourne - Coode of Polapit Tamar, of Coley - Crawfurd of East Grinstead - Cripps of Cirencester - Cure of Blake Hall - Dugdale of Griffin, of Wroxall Abbey - Fernell of Sheffield - Gatty - Gibson of Saffron Walden - Gwatkin, of Potterne - Hope-Edwardes of Netley - Jeaffreson of Framlingham - Johnson of Hornchurch - Josselyn of Ipswich - Joynson of Liscard - Jubb - Langley - Lee of Thame - Lockett of Liverpool - Manning of Diss - Markham of Creaton - Martyn of Tonacombe - Milborne-Swinnerton-Pilkington of Chevet - Monck of Corston - Nicholls - Oliver - Paris - Penruddocke of Compton - Percival - Price of Glynllech - Prideaux-Brune of Prideaux Place - Quayle of Crogga - Rope - Salter - Smith of Suttons - Somers of Mendip Lodge - Stucley of Affeton Castle - Tempest of Broughton - Tower of Weald Hall - Tuke of Saffron Walden - Wilder of Purley Hall - Woodrooffe
3	1895			List of Pedigrees Amphlett of Horseley - Biddell of Playford - Bond of High Ongar - Bourne of Stalmine Hall - Burke of Auberies - Chance of Birmingham Eldest, Second, Third - Clarke of Derby - Collier - Cookson of Leeds - Fair of Wellow - Field - Fletcher of Lawneswood - Floyer of Horncastle - Gilbey of Elsenham Hall - Glazebrook of Liverpool - Godden - Herbert of Clytha, of Llanarth - Hicks - Jermyn - Johnson of Yaxham - Lloyd of Stockton - Lukin of Hinton Martel - Macnamara - Maitland of Croydon - Mellor of Culmhead - Mirehouse of Hambrook - Molesworth - Ouvry - Punchard of Luton - Randall of Orford - Ratcliff of Edgbaston - Ratton - Reynard of Sunderlandwick - Rivington - Royds of Falinge - Salt - Savage of The Ards - Scarlett of Parkhurst - Shadwell of Northall - Simcoe of Wolford Lodge - Sparks of Langton Herring - Taddy of Caldecote Lodge - Taylor of Liverpool - Trotman - Upcher of Sheringham - Weldon - Welman - Wisden of Broadwater - Young of Salcombe
4	1896			List of Pedigrees Amphlett of Wychbold Hall - Baring-Gould of Lew Trenchard - Barker of St. German's Hall - Bate of Kelsterton - Brine of Blandford - Bell - Chisenhale-Marsh of Gaynes - Collins of Betterton - Colyer-Fergusson of Wombwell Hall - Cripps - Darby of Coalbrookdale - Darwin - Dowling of Chew Magna - Dugdale of Symonstone Hall - Evans of Bronwylfa, of Whitbourne Hall - Faulconer - Firth - Green of Spalding - Hall of Llanover - Hardwicke - Hill of St Catherine's, Hill - Joslin of Gaynes Park - Knapton of Boldre Hill - Lees of Clarksfield - Lindsay of Deer Park - Lyster - Marshall of Northfield - Mather - Molesworth of Pencarrow - Molesworth St. Aubyn of Clowance - Napleton - Scarsdale - Taunton of Freeland Lodge - Truscott of Heavitree - Wade of Orford - Warde of Squerryes Court - Webber of Friston, of Hopton - Wood of Gwernyfed
5	1897			List of PedigreesAllen of Thurnscoe - Barker of Ipswich - Battye of Frognal - Benson - Bromley of Badmondisfield Hall - Castle - Cator of Ollerton House - Chadwick - Chase of St. Minver - Conyers - Cooper - Craig of Dilamgerbendi Insula - Donne of Mattishall - Eastwood of Buckden Mount - Garrett of Leiston - Gay of Falmouth - Goldsmith of Huntworth House - Greenwood of Swarcliffe Hall - Groome of Earl Soham - Hutchison - Kenrick of Pendell Court - Lane of Humberstone - Little of Pitchcombe House - Lyte of Lytescary - Maddison of Partney Hall - Maddock - Midleton - Moor of Great Bealings - Morkill of Austhorpe Lodge - Onslow - Pearce-Edgcumbe of Somerleigh Court - Pole-Carew of Antony - Poole - Prideaux of Modbury - Richardson - Rimington-Wilson of Broomhead Hall - Russell of The Chantry - Skeels of Chatteris - Stanyforth of Kirk Hammerton Hall - Swann of Park View - Thurburn - Wood of Quebec
6	1898	, ,		List of Pedigrees Back of Hillingdon, of Curat's House, of Hethersett Hall - Bartlett of Parkstone, of Sherborne - Beare - Bowring - Brace of Doveridge Hall - Bush of Beckenham - Carr-Ellison of Hebburn Hall - Catlin - Clough-Taylor of Firby Hall - Cowper-Essex of Yewfield - Craig of Revell End - Didham of Middleton - Drayner - Eaton of Tolethorpe Hall - Fanshawe of Parsloes - Fawcett - Furneaux of Swilly - Fynmore of Wykeham House - Goddard - Hall of Whatton Manor - Langman - Lawrence of the City of London - Ledgard of Poole - Llewellyn of Court Colman - Lockett of The Hollies - Longstaff - Marten - Master of Bourton Grange - Norris of Wood Norton Hall - Ollivant of Huttonford - Pears of Madras, of Eton Lodge, of Repton, of Windlesham - Perceval - Roberts-West of Alscot Park - Rogers of Penrose, of Sancreed - Sexton - Shekell of Pebworth - Smith of Sidbury Hall - Starkie of Huntroyde - Thomas - Walker of The Elms - Whitby - Wilson of Sandbach
7	1899	,		List of Pedigrees Airy of Greenwich - Aldridge of St. Leonard's Forest - Alington of Little Barford Manor House - Arkwright of Willersley - Bailey of Ightham Place - Baker of Hardwicke Court - Barne of Sotterley - Barnston of Crewe Hill - Boggis-Rolfe of The Grange - Carr of Eshott Heugh - Chafy of Rous Lench - Comber of Myddleton Hall - Crisp of Southwold - Cruwys of Cruwys Morchard House - Dendy of Chichester - Dicken - Dowdeswell of Pull Court - Fawkes of Farnley Hall - Foote - Gibbins - Haslewood - Hole of Parke - I'Anson of Denton Hall - Kitchener - Law - Lukin of Felbrigge - Meller - Murray-Aynsley of Hall Court - Newdigate of Kirk - Packe of Prestwold Hall - Partridge of Hockham Hall - Pixley - Price - Roberts - Swithinbank - Windham of Felbrigge Hall
8	1900	,		List of Pedigrees Allanby of Walsoken - Allcroft of Stokesay Castle - Allix of Swaffham Prior - Armitage of Milnsbridge - Babington of Cossington - Barnardiston of The Ryes - Barrett of Milton House - Bolding of Edgbaston - Boyd of Moor House - Broadley of The Knapp - Bulkeley-Owen of Tedsmore - Carthew of Woodbridge Abbey - Caudle of Henfield - Colman - Cookson - Cripps-Day of Stratton St Margaret's - Danvers - Dodderidge of Burland - Drake-Cutcliffe of The Manor House, Lee - Fellowes of Shotesham Park - Fewtrell of Holdgate Hall - Flatt of Blaxhall - Freeman of Hidcot Bartram - Gresley of Drakelow - Haworth-Booth of Hullbank House - Heathcote of Hursley Park - Hopkins of Worthing - Hyett of Painswick House - Earl of Leicester - Locket of Stonebridge Park - Middlemore of Hawkesley - Moore of Lea End House, Alvechurch - Moore-Stevens of Cross and Winscott - Morris of York - Pack-Beresford - Parlby of Manadon - Parr of Paytoe Hall - Perrins of Davenham - Rawson of The Haugh End - Reynell-Pack of Netherton - Royds of Brereton - Tom of Little Petherick - Webb of Odstock - Wheler of Leamington Hastings - Whittingham - Baron Willoughby de Broke - Wolton of Newbourne - Wrinch of Erwarton
9	1901			List of Pedigrees Allen of Wickeridge - Allgood of Nunwick Hall - Ansell of Cors-y-gedol - Beebee of Womaston - Blumer - Branford - Brocklebank - Burrell - Bury - Cave-Browne - Clippingdale - Collyer of Hackford Hall - Colman of Nork Park - Cookson - Cremer of Beeston Hall - D'Arcy of Stanmore - Freeman of Saxmundham - Baron Gerard - Gibbons of Waresley - Hart-Davis of Frampton Cottrell - Heberden - Jessel of Ladham House - Lawson of Brough Hall - Lillingston - Locock of Speldhurst - Longden of Oakwood - Mair - Baron Middleton - Marquess of Normanby - Pellatt - Peren of South Petherton - Powell-Cotton of Quex Park - Royds of Heysham - Spencer - Stanford of Ashbocking - Strickland of Boynton - Thornton-Duesbery - Waller of Sutton - Ward of Nottingham - Webb of Clapham - Wheler of Leamington Hastings - Woodd of Conyngham
10	1902			List of Pedigrees Beazley - Blackburne of Hale - Boissier - Bradley of Nottingham - Brunker - Budd of Stoke Hill - Champneys of Frognal - Clapton - Cockerell - Cotton - Baron Cranworth - Earle of Allerton Tower - Faulconer of Lewes - Freeman - Fry of Birmingham - Fuller-Eliott-Drake of Nutwell Court - Goddard - Gurdon-Rebow of Wivenhoe Park - Viscount Halifax - Harington of Corston - Legh of Adlington Hall - Lloyd of Cwm Bychan - Maple of Childwick Bury - Marriott of Cotesbach - Munk - Orme - Peacock - Pearson - Rice of Loughor - Richardson of Walbrook - Earl of Sefton - Baron Sherborne - Sheriffe of Henstead Hall - Simpson of Foston Hall - Skinner of The Chantry - Turquand - Whitaker of Kirk Ella - Williams of Blackheath - Witts of Upper Slaughter - Wood
11	1903			List of Pedigrees Baron Abercromby - Barlow of Acomb - Cave-Browne-Cave of Stanford - Clark - Coode - De Chair - Baron De Mauley - Freeman of Combs - Goddard of The Lawn - Grey of Falloden - Hamilton - Harrison - Hodsoll of Loose - Hunt of Culpho - Jackson of Wisbech - Jones of Kelston Park - Landon - Lockett - Norbury - Patchett of Broom Hall - Phillips - Viscount Portman - Baron Raglan - Earl Roberts - Roddam of Roddam - Shedden of Spring Hill - Sieveking - South of Little Bentley - Steedman - Taylor of Manningtree - Teague - Thursby of Ormerod House - Welch - Wood - Worsley of Hovingham
12	1904	,		List of Pedigrees Abney of Measham Hall - Alderson - Baron Avebury - Earl of Bessborough - Blumer - Brooks of Mistley - Bull - Baroness Burdett-Coutts - Chard - Colyer - Coode - Earl of Devon - Baronet Dimsdale - Drayner - Duncan of Lochrutton - Earl of Egmont - Fane of Wormsley - Farmer of Ascot Place - Getting - Gordon - Baron Gwydyr - Earl of Harrowby - Hinckes - Holroyd - Baron Howard of Glossop - Howard - Jalland - Duke of Norfolk - Pearce-Serocold of Cherry Hinton - Peel of Danyrallt - Powell - Puckle of Camberwell - Reddie - Round of Birch Hall - Duke of Roxburghe - Shirley - Stevenson of Playford Mount - Wollaston - Woods
13	1905	, ,		List of Pedigrees Adams of Greenfield - Earl Amherst - Baron Armstrong - Auden of Rowley Regis - Bagot - Brewster - Colyer of Farningham - Crisp of The Hall, Playford - Duncan of Lochrutton - Dunne of Gatley Park - Edmeades of Nurstead Court - Finnemore - Fisher - Fletcher of Allerton - Graham - Keighly-Peach of Idlicote - Kenrick - Littledale of Highfield - Master of Barrow Green House - Maughan-Ettrick - Baronet Milner of Nun Appleton - Earl Nelson - Earl of Powis - Ridley - Round of West Bergholt - Earl of Scarbrough - Sherborn - Baron Shuttleworth - Spedding - Baron Tenterden - Baronet Treves - Vaillant of Weybridge - Vidler - Baronet Wigan
14	1906	,		List of Pedigrees Earl of Ancaster - Atlay - Baronet Barlow - Barry - Bodington of Cubbington - Baron Brassey - Baronet Clay of Burrows Lea - Comber of East Newton - Courtenay - Crisp of Friern Barnet - Dale - Darell of Trewonian - Dent - Disraeli of Hughenden Manor - Elliot - Eyre-Matcham of Newhouse - Fanshawe of Dengey - Earl Fitzwilliam - Gidley of Exeter - Griffith - Harwood - Helps - Jalland of Holderness House - Mawdesley - Moore - Morrice of Betshanger - Pickersgill-Cunliffe of Staughton Manor - Potts of Berwick-on-Tweed - Baronet Poynter - Ratcliff - Baron Rendlesham - Baronet Rugge-Price of Spring Grove - Stapleton of Warbrook - Talboys of Doughton Manor - Baron Tennyson - Thursfield - Vincent - Wescombe of Doddington - White - Woodhead - Wright of Wold Newton
15	1908	,		List of Pedigrees Baron Amherst of Hackney - Arkwright of Sutton Scarsdale - Askwith - Bendall - Benyon - Brewster - Burroughes of Burlingham Hall - Crispe - Deacon - Baron De Ramsey - Baronet Dixon-Hartland of Middleton Manor - Fanshawe - Fellowes - Baronet Forwood - Freeman - Goddard of Broad Chalke - Viscount Goschen - Gower of Tunbridge Wells - Hovenden - Marsh - Marshall of Sandford St. Martin - Mason of Melton Mowbray - Murray of Titchfield Abbey - Oswell - Baronet Parry - Pearson of South Wingfield - Player of Saffron Walden - Price - Prideaux - Rew - Rudge of Evesham - Scott - Sheppard - Simpson - Turnbull - Walker of Blyth Hall - Earl of Warwick - Wills of St. Leonard's - Woodthorpe - Wright of Brattleby
16	1909			List of Pedigrees Baronet Abel - Allix of Willoughby - Bazely of Dover - Baronet Bingham - Baronet Boothby - Baronet Bradford - Baron Byron - Carter of Northwold - Codrington - Collyer - Comber - Cormick - Baronet Cunliffe of Acton Park - Baronet Darell - Duke of Devonshire - Everett of Sutton Veny - Fellowes - Ferard - Freshfield - Grellier - Hamilton - Hind - Leigh of Bardon - Lowe with Hill-Lowe - Moore of Appleby Hall - Newman - Penny - Porter of Trematon - Preston - Prideaux - Rawson - Earl of Rosebery - Spooner - Stacey - Strode of Newnham Park - Baron Walsingham - Wilberforce of Markington - Woollcombe-Boyce of Lake House
17	1911	,		List of Pedigrees Bazely - Bicknell - Bodington - Boyce - Branfill of Upminster Hall - Broadbent - Burn - Cubitt of Honing Hall - De Morgan - Earl of Derby - Baronet Dilke - Earl of Erne - Fellowes - Fonnereau of Christ Church Park - Franklin - French - Viscount Gough - Gurdon of Assington - Hayter - Hayter-Hames - Hensley - Knight of Glen Parva - Baronet Knill - Ladds - Lambert of Banstead - Moor of Rugby - Morris - Mytton of Garth and Penylar - Norris - Peckham - Rawson - Reynolds - Rhodes - Baronet Rushout - Russell of Stubbers - Shairp of Kirkton - Spooner - Stocker - Stradling - Thorp of Blidworth - Vassall - Wolryche-Whitmore
18	1914			List of Pedigrees Adams of Anstey - Adamson of Linden Hall - Anwyl-Passingham of Bala - Arkwright of Sanderstead - Baron Ashcombe - Baron Bagot - Bickley of Moseley - Boughey of Aqualate - Bridge - Carbonell - Viscount Combermere - Cotton-Jodrell of Reaseheath Hall - Baronet Crisp of Bungay - Cubitt of Catfield Hall - Baron Dimsdale - Ekins - Fane of Fulbeck - Fellowes - Fripp - Fuller - Gater of North Stoneham - Gepp of Chelmsford - Goddard of The Manor House - Hinchliff - Homer of Sedgley - Hooke - Earl Howe - Maskew of Dorchester - Moore - Parish - Passingham of Hendwr - Pennyman (formerly Worsley) of Ormesby Hall - Scott of Beauclerc - Spooner - Tuson of Northover - Earl of Westmorland - Wollaston of Shenton - Baron Zouche
19	1917	,		List of Pedigrees Barnard - Bolton - Baronet Burdett - Burroughes - Cazalet of Fairlawne - Corder - Cross of Shrewsbury - Denne - Douglas of Salwarpe - Farnham of Quorndon - Ficklin of Tasburgh Hall - Firth - Fripp - Good of Aston Court - Goodman of Leighton Buzzard - Gower of Glandovan - Baron Haversham - Holmes of Gawdy Hall - Jackson - Jex-Blake of Swanton Abbots - Landon - Lombe of Bylaugh Park - Madan - Nelson of Holme-next-the-Sea - Baron Parmoor - Penney of Sherborne - Pytches of Melton - Rushbrooke of Rushbrooke - Baronet Scott of Great Barr - Staples of The Old Hall - Suckling of Barsham - Surtees of Redworth, of Mainsforth Hall - Tarleton of Breakspears - Tennyson-D'Eyncourt of Bayons Manor - Turney - Walker - Woollcombe of Hemerdon - Woollcombe-Adams of Anstey - Viscountess Wolseley - Worthington of Hillesdon - Marquess of Zetland
20	1919			List of Pedigrees Acton of Gatacre Park - Baron Addington - Alington of Swinhope - Baronet Arbuthnot - Arbuthnot and Arbuthnot-Leslie - Arkwright of Hampton Court - Earl of Aylesford - Baker of Bayfordbury - Blofeld of Hoveton House - Burrell of Knepp Castle - Bush of Bradford-on-Avon - Challinor of Pickwood - Chevallier of Aspall Hall - Clive of Perrystone Court, of Whitfield - Cobbold of Holywells - Crispin of Dodbrooke Manor - Curtler of Bevere House - Duddridge of Bicknoller - Eno of Wood Hall - Fanshawe - Fellowes-Gordon of Knockespoch - Fry of Finchley - Earl of Halsbury - Janson - Maughan of Collingwood House - Morris of Netherwood Manor - Mortimer of Wigmore - Duke of Newcastle - Ransome of Ipswich - Reynolds - Rouse - Wagner - Whitmore of Orsett Hall - Wild - Wilshere of The Frythe - Wormald
21	1921			List of Pedigrees Ackers of Huntley Manor - Attwood of Sion Hill - Viscount Barrington - Bence of Kentwell Hall - Bennet of Rougham Hall - Berney of Morton Hall - Binny - Blagg of Car-Colston - Burroughes of Long Stratton Manor - Childe-Freeman of Gaines - Baronet Clarke of Rupertswood - Dowson - Dyment of Aisholt - Eastwood of West Stoke House - Elwes of Roxby - Fitch of Hadleigh House - Freeman of Somerleaze - Viscount Hambleden - Harben of Newland Park - Hewitt - Hichens of St. Ives - Holland - Homer of Leamington, of St. Marychurch - Johnson of Stalham - Baronet Laking Ludlow-Hewitt - Lutley of Brockhampton - Macdonald of Falcon Manor - Marston of Wolverhampton - Martin - Plowes - Powell of Sharow Hall - Prescott of Bockleton Court - Richards of St. Marychurch - Sant - Schomberg - Teesdale - Thornbury - Trower - Vansittart Neale of Bisham Abbey - Verney of Claydon House - Watson of Rocester - Marquess of Winchester - Wolseley - Baronet Wolseley - Woollcombe, and of Pitton

== Notes volumes ==
Volume number	Publication date	Internet Archive links	Other full-text links	Pedigree list
Notes 1	1896			Coplestone - Goldney - Richards of Halgarrick - Preston of Barkingdon and Woolson Green - Gresham - Jodrell - Lombe, Hase and Jodrell - Sir Edward Repps Jodrell, 3rd Baronet - Index
Notes 2	1897	,		Plumbe - Tempest of Tong - Guille, Seigneurs de St. George - Williams - Brown - Page-Turner of Ambrosden - Eales - Bartlett of Marldon - Assheton - Brooke - Emeris - Swann - Higgins - Watney - Cass - Index
Notes 3	1898			Bentley - Bagshawe - Methold - Prentice - Porter - Rev. Robert Hesketh (died 1837) - Bowstead - Sterry - Flavell - Sparke of Coventry - Bushe - Plumer - Sparrow - Littledale - Wyckham of Swaclyfe Wickham - Pilkington - Edwards - Ricketts - Dickinson - Binley - Crawfurd - Index
Notes 4	1902			Woodrooffe - Somers - Coode - Cure - Markham - Tower - Josselyn - Penruddocke - Nicholls - Jeaffreson - Percival - Dugdale - Britton - Waddon - Tuke - Gibson - Langley - Lockett - Carlyon - Manning - Wilder - Monck - Oliver - Stucley - Pilkington - Lloyd - Savage - Young - Royds - Rivington - Upcher - Index
Notes 5	1903	,		Welman - Lukin - Chance - Fletcher - Salt - Shadwell - Floyer - Cookson - Punchard - Bourne - Mirehouse - Trotman - Ouvry - Garnault - Jermyn - Baring - Gould - Green - Darby - Amphlett of Hadzor, of Clent - Warde - Wood - Curzon - Faulconer - Bell - Molesworth - Collins - Lyster - Colyer - Hardwicke - Wade - Taunton - Fox - Battye - Pearce - Serocold - Groome - Maddock - Craig - Onslow - Index
Notes 6	1906			Castle - Allen - Moor - Brodrick - Richardson - Donne - Thurburn - Benson - Kenrick - Bromley - Garrett - Maddison - Lyte of Lytescary - Wilson - Rimington - Walker - Ollivant - Sexton - Wilson of Sandbach - Bartlett - Furneaux - Fynmore - West - Goddard of Upham - Goddard - Shekell - Cromwell - Eaton - Perceval - Norris - Fanshawe - Back - Rogers - Master - Starkie - Carr - Ellison - Kitchener of Binsted, of Lakenheath - Index
Notes 7	1907			Arkwright - Barnston - Cruwys - Alington - Newdigate - Parker - I'Anson - Aldridge - Dendy - Dowdeswell - Price - Hawksworth - Ramsden - Crisp - Chafy - Foot - Dicken - Comber - Meller - Barne - Partridge - Packe - Heathcote - Heathcote of Hursley - Hall - Allenby - Barnard - Barnardiston of Ketton, of Brightwell, of Bedford of Clare, of the Ryes - Index
Notes 8	1909			Pedigree list - Dudderidge - Danvers - Rawson - Armitage - Middlemore, of Lusby - Wheler of Martin Hussingtree, of Leamington Hastings, of Whitley, of Ryding Court - Babington of Rothley Temple, of Curborough - Fellows - Moore - Drake - Gresley of Drakelow, of Nether Seale - Adams - Haworth - Morris - Allix - Hatchett - Colman - Coke - Pack - Collyer - Cave of Stanford, of Stretton-en-le-Field - Spooner - Gibbons - Phipps - Heberden - Cotton - Woodd - Cremer - Allgood - Strickland - Gerard of Bryn - Bury, of Linwood Grange - Index
Notes 9	1911			Pedigree list - Willoughby - Wright - Locock - Pellatt - Clippingdale - D'Arcy - Waller - Drake - Fuller of Waldron - Fry - Naper of Swyre and Loughcrew - Napper of Holywell - Napier of More Crichell - Napier of Puncknoll - Cockerell - Rebow - Turquand - Boissier - Cotton - Pearson - Legh - Crosse - Gurdon of Assington, of Letton - Earle - Harington - Wood - Blackburne - Molyneux - Goddard of Swindon - Shedden - Berkeley of Bruton - Portman - Berkeley of Pylle - Index
Notes 10	1913			Pedigree list - Hodsoll - Barlow - Steedman - Thursby of Abington Abbey - Somerset - Worsley of Hovingham - Landon - Ponsonby - Jackson - De Chair - Grey of Howick and Falloden - Round - Holroyd - Peel - Jalland - Lubbock - Wollaston, of Finborough - Fane - Hinckes - Burrell - Abney of Measham - Duncan - Ryder - Burdett of Foremark - Alderson - Bagot, of Pipe Hall - Amherst - Brewster of Castle Hedingham - Brewster - Adams - Index
Notes 11	1915			Pedigree list - Vaillant - Milner - Sherborn - Lumley - Clive of Styche - Crisp - Fisher - Spedding - Shuttleworth - Edmeades - Nelson - Bolton - Ettricke - Barry - Fitzwilliam of Milton - Wright - Cunliffe - Morrice of Betshanger - Brassey - Atlay - Clay - Tennyson - Talboys - Bodington of Cubbington - Thellusson - Gidley - Stephens - Darell of Trewornan - Griffith - Vincent - Penny - Thursfield - Jalland of Holderness - Barlow - Oswell - Greville of Beauchamps Court and Warwick Castle - Wills - Hartland - Gower - Index
Notes 12	1917			Pedigree list - Bendall - Walker - Woodthorpe - Amhurst - Marshall of Enstone - Askwith - Mason - Rudge - Hovenden - Player - Goddard of East Woodyates - Burroughes - Grellier - de Grey of Merton - Byron - Fellowes - Darell of Scotney, of Richmond Hill - Moore - Cunliffe - Leigh of Bardon - Bazely - Wilberforce - Primrose - Lowe of Lichfield, of Bromsgrove - Strode - Porter - Newman - Boothby - Lambert - Cubitt of Catfield and Honing - Knight - Bicknell - Hayter - Ladds - Branfill - Rushout - Index
Notes 13	1919			Pedigree list - Adams - Baronet Boughley - Cazalet - Crisp - Baronet Dilke - Baron Dimsdale - Ekins - Eliot of Port Eliot - Fetherston of Packwood - Fonnereau - French - Fripp - Hayter - Hinchliff - Homer of Sedgley - Earl Howe - Madan - Mytton - Passingham - Peckham - Pennyman - Rhodes - Rushbrooke - Thorp of Nottingham - Vassall - Whitmore - Zouche
