= Thursby (disambiguation) =

Thursby is a village in northern England.

Thursby may also refer to:

== Surname ==
- Thursby (surname)
- Floyd Thursby, a fictional character in The Maltese Falcon (novel)

== Other uses ==
- Thursby Baronets, an extinct title in the Baronetage of the United Kingdom

== See also ==
- Sir John Thursby Community College in Lancashire, England
- Louis P. Thursby House in Orange City, Florida
