= Bicknell (disambiguation) =

Bicknell is a surname.

Bicknell may also refer to:

- Bicknell, Indiana, United States, a city
- Bicknell, Utah, United States, a town
