= Hoblyn =

Hoblyn is a surname. Notable people with the surname include:

- John Hoblyn (c. 1660–1706), English lawyer
- John Paget Figg-Hoblyn (1926–2011), professor and taxonomist
- Robert Hoblyn (1710–1756), English politician and book collector
- Thomas Hoblyn (1835–1866), English British Army officer and cricketer
- Tom Hoblyn, British garden designer
