= Woodthorpe =

Woodthorpe may refer to the following places in England:

- Woodthorpe, Staveley, a village in the parish of Staveley, in the Borough of Chesterfield, Derbyshire
- Woodthorpe, North East Derbyshire, a former civil parish of Chesterfield Rural District, near Clay Cross, Derbyshire
- Woodthorpe, Leicestershire
- Woodthorpe, Lincolnshire, a location in Strubby with Woodthorpe parish
- Woodthorpe, North Yorkshire
- Woodthorpe, Nottinghamshire
- Woodthorpe, South Yorkshire, in Richmond, Sheffield

== See also ==
- Woodthorpe (surname)
