= Joynson =

Joynson is a surname, and may refer to:

- Gillian Joynson-Hicks (1942–2024), British Anglican evangelical and activist
- Lancelot Joynson-Hicks, 3rd Viscount Brentford (1902–1983), English solicitor and politician
- Mary Joynson (1924–2013), British childcare worker
- William Joynson (1917–2000), British Army officer and
- William Joynson-Hicks, 1st Viscount Brentford (1865–1932), English solicitor and politician

== See also ==
- Johnson (surname)
