= Danvers =

Danvers, D'Anvers or d'Anvers may refer to:

== People ==
- Danvers (surname)
- Caleb D'Anvers, pseudonym of Nicholas Amhurst (1697–1742), English poet, political writer and editor of The Craftsman

== Places ==
=== In Canada ===
- Danvers, Nova Scotia

=== In the United States ===
- Danvers, Illinois
- Danvers, Massachusetts
  - Danvers State Hospital, in Danvers, Massachusetts
- Danvers, Minnesota
- Danvers, Montana

== Art, entertainment, and media ==
- Dédée d'Anvers (1948), a French film

== See also ==
- Danver, Colorado a fictional town in the 2002 American film Interstate 60
