= Joseph Jackson Howard =

British genealogist

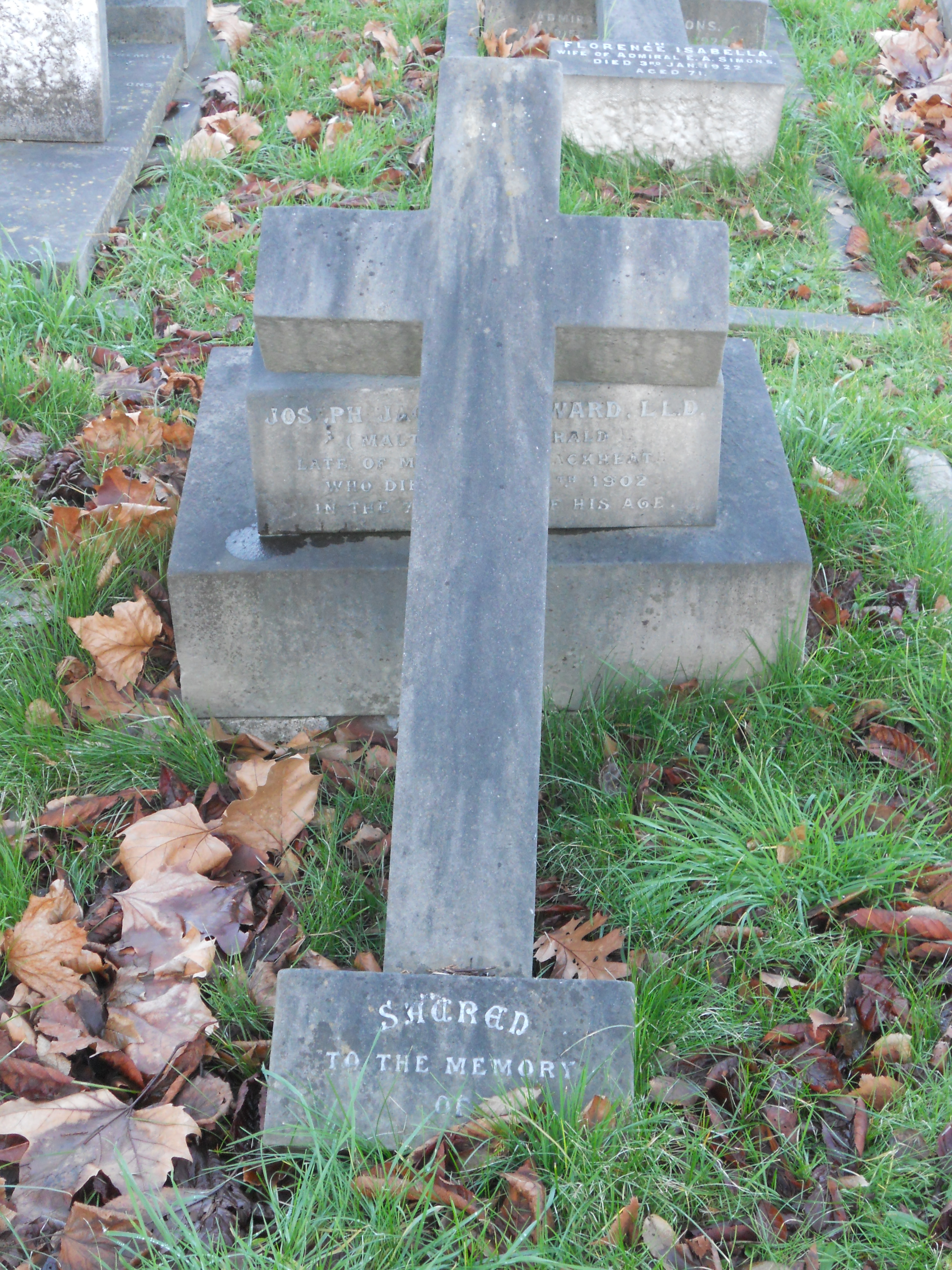
Grave of Howard in Twickenham Cemetery in 2014

Arms of J. J. Howard

Joseph Jackson Howard, LL.D., FSA (12 April 1827 – 18 April 1902) was an English genealogist who was Maltravers Herald of Arms Extraordinary from 1887 to 1902.

== Life ==
The only son of Peter Howard of Clifton Cottage, Portland Place, Leamington, he was educated at Trinity Hall, Cambridge. He entered Lincoln's Inn in 1847 and was called to the bar in 1856. A pioneer of the Civil Service Cooperative Stores, which became the Civil Service Supply Association, of which he was Chairman, he became Maltravers Herald Extraordinary in 1887. Having been elected Fellow of the Society of Antiquaries in 1854, he originated and was editor of Miscellanea Genealogica et Heraldica from 1866, was a founder of the Harleian Society, and joint-founder and editor of The Visitation of England and Wales, 1893, and The Visitation of Ireland, 1897. An early collector of bookplates, he purchased in 1859 the collection of Miss Maria Jenkins, and published examples of the bookplates of baronets in 1895.

Howard married in 1862 Ellen Clare West, the daughter of Joshua and Ann West. His body rests in Twickenham Cemetery.
