= Gepp =

Gepp is a surname, and may refer to:

- Ethel Sarel Gepp (1864-1922), English phycologist
- Gerhard Gepp (1940–2024), Austrian illustrator and designer
- H. W. Gepp (1877–1954), Australian industrial chemist, businessman and public servant
- Mark Gepp (fl. 2010s), Australian politician
- Tim Gepp (born 1960), Australian rules footballer

== See also ==
- Gepp, Arkansas, an unincorporated community in the U.S.
- Gepps Cross, South Australia, a suburb of Adelaide, Australia
- GEPP, Mexican-owned PepsiCo bottling company
