= Passingham =

Passingham is a surname. Notable people with the surname include:

- Kenneth Passingham, British film writer, biographer and critic
- Richard Passingham (born 1943), British neuroscientist
