= Mytton (surname) =

Mytton is a surname, and may refer to:

- Adam Mytton (1498–1561), English MP
- Devereaux Mytton (1924–1989), Australian competitive sailor and Olympic medalist
- John Mytton (1796–1834), British eccentric and Regency rake
- Richard Mytton (1501–1591), English politician
- Sarah Mytton Maury (1801–1839), English-American author
- Thomas Mytton (died ?1563), English politician
- Thomas Mytton (1597–1656), English Parliamentarian general of the English Civil War

== See also ==
- Mitton (surname)
