= Bodington =

Bodington is a surname. Notable people with the surname include:

- Alice Bodington (1840–1897), British Canadian science writer and populariser of science
- Bob Bodington (1894–1976), Australian rules footballer
- Cecil Bodington (1880–1917), English cricketer
- David Bodington (born 1947), British speed skater
- Eric Bodington (1862–1929), British Anglican priest and author, Archdeacon of Wilts 1912 to 1927
- George Bodington (1799–1882), British physician
- Nathan Bodington (1848–1911), English classical scholar
- Nicolas Bodington (1904–1974), British intelligence operative
- Oliver Bodington (1859–1936), English barrister

== See also ==
- Boddington (disambiguation)
