= Dudderidge =

Dudderidge is a surname. Notable people with the surname include:

- John Dudderidge (1906–2004), English canoeist
- Phil Dudderidge (born 1949), English sound engineer

== See also ==
- Duddridge
