= Boissier =

Boissier is a surname, and may refer to:

- Bernard Boissier (born 1952), French football player
- François Boissier de Sauvages de Lacroix (1706–1767), French physician and botanist
- Marie-Louis-Antoine-Gaston Boissier (1823–1908), French classical scholar
- Paul Boissier (1881–1953), English headmaster
- Paul Boissier (Royal Navy officer) (born 1953)
- Pierre Augustin Boissier de Sauvages (1710–1795), French naturalist and encyclopedist
- Pierre Edmond Boissier (1810–1885), Swiss botanist, explorer and mathematician
- Yves Boissier (born 1944), French fencer
- Jean-Louis Boissier (born 1945), French artist

== See also ==
- Fernando Léon (sailor), full name Fernando Léon Boissier
- June Gordon, Marchioness of Aberdeen and Temair, born Beatrice Mary June Boissier
