= Lombe (surname) =

Lombe is a surname. Notable people with the surname include:

- Benedict Lombe, Congolese born British playwright
- Edward Lombe (disambiguation), several people
- John Lombe (1693–1722), English silk spinner
- Thomas Lombe (1685–1739), English merchant

== See also ==
- Lombe Chibesakunda (born 1944), Zambian lawyer and diplomat
