= Moore (surname) =

English-language family name

O'More
Origin
- Origin: British Isles
- Meaning: "moor", "stately and noble"
- Region of origin: Ireland, Scotland, Wales, England, Spain, France

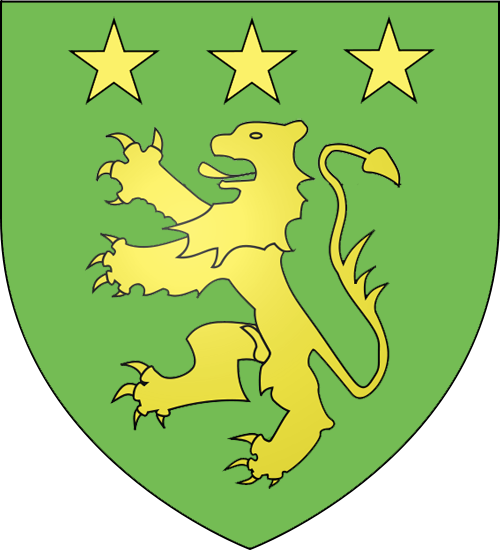
Ó Mórda.

Moore (pronounced /mʊər/ or /mɔːr/) is a common English-language surname. It was the 19th most common surname in Ireland in 1901 with 15,417 members. It is the 34th most common surname in Australia, 32nd most common in England, and was the 16th most common surname in the United States in 2000.

It can have several meanings and derivations, as it appeared as a surname long before written language had developed in most of the population, resulting in a variety of spellings.

Variations of the name can appear as Moore, More or Moor; as well as the Scottish Gaelic originations Muir, Mure and Mor/Mór; the Manx Gaelic origination Moar; the Irish originations O'More and Ó Mórdha; and the later Irish variants O'Moore and de Mora. The name also arises as an anglicisation of the Welsh epithet Mawr meaning great or large.

The similarly pronounced surname Mohr is of Germanic lineage and is not related to the Gaelic/English variations.

== Meanings and origins ==
- From Middle English mor meaning "open land" or "bog" and given to persons dwelling near a moor or heath.
- The Old Irish Moores are O'Mordha, from the Irish Gaelic word mordha, meaning "stately and noble". The Anglo-Norman Moores (established in Ireland's province of Munster soon after the Anglo/Norman invasion) are called de Mora in Irish, a phonetic rendering of the English name which is derived from the word "moor", or "heathy mountain".
- According to historian C. Thomas Cairney, the O'Mores in Ireland were one of the chiefly families of the Loígis tribe who in turn came from the Cruthin tribe who were the first Celts to settle in Ireland from between 800 and 500 BC.
- Alternatively of Gaelic/Manx origin Moar, the name for a collector of manorial rents on the Isle of Man.
- The spelling Moore was sometimes used to indicate a son of someone called More – this being one use where spelling is significant.
- Possibly derived from Maurus, a Roman first name which meant "dark skinned" in Latin, and related to the Old French More meaning "Moor" like Berber, a colloquial nickname for a person of dark complexion, often describing someone of North African descent.
- Possibly originated from early references to persons who worked with boats at a wharf or moorage.
- The De La Mare surname from French Normandy was progressively anglicized in England as "de la Mare" (Walter de la Mare), "De La More", "More", and "Moore" after its bearers accompanied and assisted William the Conqueror in his conquest of England, eventually settling in Benenden, Kent County for several centuries, before many moved to America, including Reverend John Moore of Newtown, Long Island. The De La Mares of Normandy trace their heritage to Vikings and the coastal city of Møre og Romsdal in Norway. The Møre surname is a place name derived from the Old Norse "Moerr", and the Norwegian word "Marr", meaning ocean, sea, or coastal district. Rollo, the famous Viking and founder of the Dukes of Normandy, may have been a member of this family, if his father - as some historians have it - was Rognvald Eysteinsson, Earl of Møre, Norway.

== Frequency ==
In the United States, "Moore" ranked 9th among all surnames in the 1990 census, accounting for 0.3% of the population.

== See also ==
- Moor (surname)
- De Moor, a Dutch surname
- Irish clans
- List of the most common surnames in Europe
