= Lockett =

Lockett is a surname that may refer to:

== People ==
- Aaron Lockett (1892–1965), English footballer
- Charles Lockett (born 1965), American football wide receiver
- Clayton Lockett (1975–2014), American criminal
- Colin Lockett (born 1991), American football wide receiver
- Dannie Lockett (born 1964), American football linebacker
- Gary Lockett (born 1976), Welsh boxer
- Harry Lockett (1855–1930), early English football manager and administrator
- Horace Lockett (born 2004), American football player
- Jack Lockett (1891–2002), oldest Australian World War I veteran
- James R. Lockett (1855–1933), U.S. colonel
- Jeannie Lockett (1847–1890), Australian schoolteacher and writer
- John W. Lockett (1937–1999), American football fullback from University of Central Oklahoma
- Johnny Lockett (1915–2004), British Grand Prix motorcyclist
- Kaliq Lockett (born 2006), American football player
- Ken Lockett (born 1947), Canadian ice hockey goalkeeper
- Kevin Lockett (born 1974), American football wide receiver
- Lester Lockett (1912–2005), American Negro league baseball player
- Mary Fauriel Lockett (1911–1982), English/Australian pharmacologist
- Mornington Lockett (born 1961), English jazz saxophonist
- Nicky Lockett (born 1970), or Lockett, other names of MC Tunes, British rapper
- Pete Lockett, English percussionist and recording artist
- Samuel Henry Lockett (1837–1891), Confederate colonel
- Sarah Lockett (born 1968), TV news anchor and reporter
- Tony Lockett (born 1966), Australian rules football player, leading VFL/AFL goalkicker
- Tyler C. Lockett (1932–2020), American jurist
- Tyler Lockett (born 1992), American football wide receiver for the Seattle Seahawks
- Vivian Lockett (1880–1962), English colonel in the British army, and a 10 goal handicap player

== Fictional characters ==
- The Lockett family, subject of a 1936–1950 series of children's novels by M.E. Atkinson
- Corporal Jason Lockett, character in the 2011 film Battle Los Angeles

== See also ==
- Camp Lockett, United States Army base in Campo, California (named after James R. Lockett)
- Lockett, Texas, United States
