= Thursfield =

Thursfield is a surname. Notable people by that name include:

- David Thursfield (born 1945), former British Ford executive
- Sir James Thursfield (1840–1923), British naval historian.
- Martin Thursfield (born 1971), English cricketer.
- Will Thursfield (born 1986), Australian rules footballer.
