= Bagshawe =

Bagshawe is a surname, and may refer to:

- Edward Bagshawe (bishop) (1829–1915), Roman Catholic Bishop of Nottingham
- Edward Bagshawe of Finglas (died 1657), knighted in 1627, comptroller of customs, member of parliament
- Francis Bagshawe (1832–1896), English landowner who served as High Sheriff of Derbyshire in 1868
- Joseph Ridgard Bagshawe (1870–1909), English marine painter and member of the Staithes group
- Kenneth Bagshawe CBE, FRS (1925–2022), British oncologist, Emeritus Professor of Medical Oncology, Charing Cross Hospital
- Louise Bagshawe or Louise Mensch (born 1971), English author who writes under her maiden name
- Samuel Bagshawe (1713–1762), English soldier and politician
- Tilly Bagshawe (born 1973), British freelance journalist and author
- William Bagshawe (1828–1854), English landowner and rower who won the Diamond Challenge Sculls at Henley Royal Regatta in 1848

== See also ==
- Mount Bagshawe, southernmost and highest of the Batterbee Mountains, inland from George VI Sound on the west coast of Palmer Land
- Bagshawe Glacier drains the northeast slopes of Mount Theodore into Lester Cove, Andvord Bay west of Mount Tsotsorkov, on the west coast of Graham Land, Antarctica
- Baghaw
- Bagshaw
- Bagshaw (surname)
- Bashaw (disambiguation)
