= Flavel =

Flavel is a surname, and may refer to:

- Andrew Flavel (born 1971), Australian wheelchair basketball player
- Anton Flavel (born 1969), Australian Paralympic athlete
- Dale Flavel (born 1946), Canadian politician
- George Flavel, builder of Flavel House
- John Flavel (c.1627–1691), English Presbyterian clergyman and author
- John Flavel (logician) (1596–1617), English logician
- Thomas Flavel (1793–1829), English professional cricketer
- William Flavel, claimed designer of the Kitchener range cooking appliance, at Flavels foundry, England

== See also ==
- Flavell
- Flavel, part of the duo Flavel & Neto
- Flavel K. Granger (1832-1905), American lawyer and farmer
