= Lowcock =

Lowcock is a surname. Notable people with the surname include:

- Henry Lowcock (c. 1837–1901), British businessman
- Mark Lowcock (born 1962), British civil servant

== See also ==
- Locock
