= Mure =

Mure may refer to:

== Places ==
- Mure, Kagawa, Japan, a former town
- Mure, Nagano, Japan, a former village
- Mure (Raška), Serbia, a village
- La Mure, a commune in the French department of Isère

== Other uses ==
- Mure (surname)
- Clan Muir, also spelled Mure, a Scottish clan
- Mure baronets, an extinct title in the Baronetage of Nova Scotia
- Mure language, an extinct language of Bolivia
- Chemin de fer de La Mure, a historic electrified railway in France
- Mure Station, a railway station in Iizuna, Nagano, Japan

== See also ==
- Muir (disambiguation)
- Murre, a kind of bird
- Murree
