= Rimington (surname) =

Rimington is a surname, and may refer to:

- Alexander Wallace Rimington (1854–1918), English artist
- Anthony Rimington, British Royal Navy officer
- Camilla Rimington (1883–1953), English tennis player
- Dave Rimington (born 1960), American football player
- John Rimington (civil servant) (born 1935), British civil servant
- John Rimington (politician) (born 1952), Manx politician
- Michael Rimington (1858–1928), British Army officer
- Sammy Rimington (born 1942), British jazz musician
- Samuel Rimington (1739/40–1826), British Army officer
- Stanley Rimington (1892–1991), Australian cricketer
- Stella Rimington (1935–2025), British Director General of MI5 (1992–1996)

== See also ==
- Remington (surname)
- Rivington (surname)
