= Upcher =

Upcher is an English surname. Notable people with the surname include:

- Henry Morris Upcher (1839–1921), English naturalist and ornithologist
- James Hay Upcher (1854–1931), English-born clergyman
- Russell Upcher (1844–1937), British military officer
