= Vidler =

Vidler is a surname. Notable people with the name include:

- Alec Vidler (1889–1991), English theological writer
- Bob Vidler (born 1957), Australian cricketer
- Ivor Vidler (1909–1976), Australian public servant
- Jack Vidler (1905–1953), English footballer
- John Vidler (1890–1967), English cricketer and prison governor
- Ken Vidler (born 1954), Australian sprint canoer
- Melina Vidler (born 1993), Australian actress
- Steven Vidler (actor) (born 1960), Australian actor
- Steven Vidler (judoka) (born 1977), Scottish judoka
- William Vidler (1758–1816), English nonconformist minister and editor
