= Stucley =

Stucley or Stukley is a surname, and may refer to:

- George Stucley, 1st Baronet (1812–1900), a British Member of Parliament
- Hugh Stucley (1496–1559), Sheriff of Devon in 1545
- Lewis Stukley (died 1620), Vice-Admiral of Devonshire and foe of Sir Walter Raleigh
- Richard Stucley (died 1441), English landowner, administrator and politician
- Thomas Stukley (c. 1520–1578), English mercenary and rebel against Queen Elizabeth I, son of Hugh Stucley
- Thomas Stucley (MP) (1620–1663), English politician and Royalist supporter in the English Civil War

== See also ==
- Stuckey (surname)
- Stukeley
