= Burroughes =

Burroughes is a surname. Notable people with the surname include:

- Henry Negus Burroughes (1791–1872), British politician
- Jeremy Burroughes (born 1960), British physicist and engineer
- Dorothy Burroughes (1883–1963), British artist

== See also ==
- Burroughs (surname)
