= Jalland =

Jalland is a surname. Notable people with the surname include:

- Arthur Edgar Jalland (1889–1958), British QC, judge and politician
- Jørgen Jalland (born 1977), Norwegian footballer
- Pat Jalland (born 1941), Australian historian
- Robert Jalland (1801–1883), English architect
