= Guille (surname) =

Guille is a surname and may refer to:

- Albert Guille (1854–1914), French operatic tenor
- Braian Guille (born 1997), Argentine footballer
- Cédric Guille (born 1978), French artistic gymnast
- Derek Guille (born 1951), Australian radio presenter
- John Guille (born 1949), British Anglican priest
