= Bushe =

Bushe is a surname. Notable people with the surname include:

- Paul Bushe (1492–1558), first Bishop of Bristol
- Amyas Bushe (1665–1730), sheriff, MP, fought for James II at Battle of the Boyne
- Gervase Parker Bushe (1744–1793), Irish lawyer and MP
- Charles Kendal Bushe (1767–1843), Irish judge
- Eddie Bushe (born 1951), Irish cricketer
- Gervase Parker Bushe (1744–1793), Irish landowner and politician
- Gervase Roy Bushe (born 1955), professor, Simon Fraser University
- Grattan Bushe (1886–1961), Governor of Barbados
- Jason Bushe (born 1969), Irish footballer
- John Scott Bushe (died 1887), Colonial Secretary, Trinidad BWI
- Jonathan Bushe (born 1978), Irish cricketer
- Joscelyn Plunket Bushe-Fox (1880–1954), British archaeologist, civil servant and army officer
- Letitia Bushe (c.1705/1710–1757), Irish watercolourist and miniaturist
- Paddy Bushe (born 1949) is an Irish poet
- Raymond 'Ray' Bushe (b. 1942), Irish footballer

== See also ==
- Bush (surname)
- Bushe River 207 Indian reserve in Alberta, Canada
