= Jermyn (surname) =

Jermyn is a surname, and may refer to:

- Ambrose Jermyn (1511–1577), English courtier, magistrate and landowner
- George Bitton Jermyn (1789–1857), English cleric and antiquarian
- Henry Jermyn, 1st Earl of St Albans (c.1604–1684)
- Henry Jermyn, 1st Baron Dover (c.1636–1708)
- Henry Jermyn (antiquary) (1767–1820), English antiquarian
- Hugh Jermyn (1820-1903), Anglican bishop
- James Jermyn, Anglican priest in New Zealand
- John Jermyn (field hockey) (born 1982), Irish field hockey player
- John Wesley Jermyn, homeless street performer in Los Angeles
- Laetitia Jermyn (1788–1848), British entomologist, illustrator and author
- Mark Jermyn (born 1981), British footballer
- Robert Jermyn (1539–1614), English landowner and politician
- Robert Jermyn (1601–1623), English Member of Parliament, grandson of Robert Jermyn (1539–1614)
- Sir Thomas Jermyn (died 1552), English knight
- Thomas Jermyn (1561–1607), Member of Parliament
- Thomas Jermyn (1573–1645), English Royalist soldier and politician
- Thomas Jermyn (1604–1659). English courtier and politician
- Thomas Jermyn, 2nd Baron Jermyn (died 1703), English Member of Parliament, nephew of Henry Jermyn, 1st Baron Dover
