= Rebow =

Rebow is a surname, and may refer to:

- Francis Slater Rebow (1770–1845), British Army officer
- Isaac Rebow (1655–1726), English merchant and politician
- Isaac Martin Rebow (1731–1781), British landowner and politician
- John Gurdon Rebow] (1799–1870), English politician

== See also ==
- Rębów, Świętokrzyskie Voivodeship
