= Crispe =

Crispe is a surname. Notable people with the surname include:

- Asher Crispe, American Orthodox rabbi
- Henry Crispe (by 1505–1575), English landowner and politician
- Nicholas Crispe (c. 1599–1666), English royalist and merchant
- Crispe baronets
