= Foljambe =

Foljambe is a surname, and may refer to:

- Arthur Foljambe, 2nd Earl of Liverpool (1870–1941), British politician, the 16th and last Governor of New Zealand, and the first Governor-General of New Zealand
- Cecil Foljambe, 1st Earl of Liverpool (1846–1907), British politician
- Sir Francis Foljambe, 1st Baronet (died 1640), English politician, Member of Parliament for Pontefract
- Francis Ferrand Foljambe (1749–1814), English politician, Member of Parliament for Yorkshire, and for Higham Ferrers
- Francis Foljambe (Liberal politician) (1830–1917), English politician, Member of Parliament for East Retford
- George Foljambe (1856–1920), English cricketer and soldier
- George Savile Foljambe (1800–1869), British aristocrat
- Sir Godfrey de Foljambe (1317–1376), English landowner and politician
