= Master (surname) =

Master is a surname.

== Notable people ==
- Edith Master (1932–2013), Jewish-American equestrian
- Edward Master (1610–1691), English politician
- Inzimamul Master (born 1994 ), Botswana cricketer
- John Master (1637–c.1680), English physician
- John Master (MP) (c.1490–1558), Member of Parliament (MP) for Sandwich 1545-1547, 1554
- Richard Master, 16th-century English physician
- Robert Master (1794–1867), Archdeacon of Manchester, England
- Sadiris Master (died 1958), Sri Lankan musician and actor
- Sheridan F. Master (1869–1927), American politician
- Sir Streynsham Master (1640–1724), English colonial administrator
- Thomas Chester-Master (1815–1899), Member of Parliament (MP) for Cirencester 1837–1844
- Thomas Chester-Master (1841–1914), Member of Parliament (MP) for Cirencester 1878–1885, 1892–1893
- Sir William Master (MP for Cirencester) (1600–1662), English politician
- William Master (author) (1627–1684), his son, English divine and writer
- William Master (MP for Ipswich), 14th-century English politician

== See also ==
- MacMaster (surname)
- McMaster (surname)
