= Haslewood =

Haslewood is a surname. Notable people with the surname include:

- Ashby Haslewood (1810–1876), English cleric and educationalist
- Joseph Haslewood (1769–1833), English writer and antiquarian
