= Cator =

Cator is a surname. Notable people with the surname include:

- Albemarle Cator (1877–1932), British Army officer
- Geoffrey Edmund Cator (1884–1973), British civil servant
- Joe Cator (born 1998), English rugby league footballer
- John Cator (1728–1806), British timber merchant and landowner
- John Cator (Huntingdon MP) (1862–1944), English politician
- Harry Cator (1894–1966), English recipient of the Victoria Cross
- Rhonda Cator (born 1966), retired female badminton player from Australia
- Silvio Cator (1900–1952), Haitian athlete
- Thomas Vincent Cator (1888–1931), American composer
- William Cator (1839–1902), Irish cricketer and clergyman
