= William Joynson =

English cricketer

Personal information
- Full name: William Reginald Hamborough Joynson
- Born: 18 May 1917; Bickley, Kent, England
- Died: 4 December 2000 (aged 83); Bath, Somerset, England
- Batting: Right-handed

Domestic team information
- Years: Team
- 1939: Oxford University

Career statistics
Competition	First-class
Matches	2
Runs scored	30
Batting average	7.50
100s/50s	–/–
Top score	11
Catches/stumpings	–/–
- Source: Cricinfo, 15 May 2020

William Reginald Hamborough Joynson (18 May 1917 – 4 December 2000) was an English first-class cricketer and British Army officer.

The son of Lieutenant Colonel William Owen Hamborough Joynson, one-time chairman of Kent County Cricket Club, he was born at Bickley in May 1917. He was educated at Harrow School, before going up to Christ Church, Oxford. While studying at Oxford, Joynson made two appearances in first-class cricket for Oxford University at Oxford in 1939, against Gloucestershire and Yorkshire. However, any further prospect of playing first-class cricket for Oxford was curtailed by the commencement of the Second World War in September 1939. Joynson served in the war, being commissioned into the Royal Artillery as a second lieutenant in October 1940. Following the war, Joynson became a farmer in Kent. He died in December 2000 at Bath, Somerset.
