= Woodhead (surname) =

Woodhead is a surname. Notable people with the surname include:

- Abraham Woodhead (1609–1678), English writer
- Chris Woodhead (1946–2015), British educationalist
- Cynthia Woodhead (born 1964), American Olympic swimmer
- Danny Woodhead (born 1985), American football running back
- Dennis Woodhead (1925–1995), English footballer
- Ernest Woodhead (1857–1944), English rugby player
- Frank Woodhead (1868–1943), English cricketer
- German Sims Woodhead (1855–1921), English pathologist
- Joseph Woodhead (1824–1913), English newspaper proprietor and politician
- Leslie Woodhead, British documentary filmmaker
- Linda Woodhead (born 1964), British sociologist
- Peter Woodhead (born 1939), Royal Navy officer
- Red Woodhead (1851–1881), American baseball player
- Robert Woodhead, entrepreneur, software engineer and former game programmer
- Simon Woodhead (born 1962), English footballer
- Thomas William Woodhead (1863-1940), English plant ecologist
- Wendy Woodhead, English table tennis player
