= Amhurst =

Amhurst is a surname, and may refer to:

- Francis Amhurst (1842–1881), Australian solicitor politician from Queensland
- Nicholas Amhurst (1697–1742), English poet and political writer
- Richard Amhurst (c.1565–c.1631), English lawyer and Member of Parliament

== See also ==
- Amherst (disambiguation)
- Amherst (surname)
