= Hodsoll =

Hodsoll is a surname. Notable people with the surname include:

- Frank Hodsoll (1938–2016), American art historian
- Kyle Hodsoll (born 1988), Bermudian cricketer
- William Hodsoll (1718–1776), English cricketer
