= Sterry =

Sterry is a surname. Notable people with the surname include:

- Arthur W. Sterry (1883–1944), Australian filmmaker, actor and theatrical entrepreneur
- Cyprian Sterry (c. 1753–1825), American merchant and slave trader
- Gwen Sterry (1905–?), English tennis player
- Jamie Sterry (born 1995), English footballer
- Nora Sterry (1879–1941), American teacher and activist
- Norman Sterry (1878–1971), American lawyer and footballer
- Peter Sterry (1613–1672), English independent theologian
- Ruth Sterry (1883–1938), American suffragist and writer
- Thomas Sterry Hunt (1826–1892), American geologist and chemist
