= Grellier =

Grellier is a surname of French Huguenot origin. Notable people with the surname include:

- David Grellier (born 1979), French electronica musician
- Fabien Grellier (born 1994), French cyclist
- Jean Grellier (born 1947), French politician
