= Wormald =

Wormald is a surname. Notable people with the surname include:

Three English cricketers:

- Alfred Wormald (1855–1940)
- Edward Wormald (1848–1928)
- Philip Wormald (b. 1963)

Four British historians:

- Jenny Wormald (1948–2015)
- Patrick Wormald (1947–2004)
- B. H. G. Wormald (1912–2005)
- Francis Wormald (1904–1972)

Other well-known people:

- Kevin Wormald, (b. 1996) Chilean weightlifter
- Ethel Wormald (1901–1993), English politician
- Frank Wormald (1868–1915), English soldier
- Harry Hugh Wormald (1879–1955), English phytopathologist and mycologist
- Kenny Wormald (b. 1984), American dancer and actor
- Leslie Wormald (1890–1965), English rower
- Nick Wormald, (b. 1953) Australian mathematician
- Steven Wormald (b. 1946), Canadian-British Antarctic explorer and meteorologist
- Thomas Wormald (1802–1873), English surgeon
- Chris Wormald (b. 1968) English civil servant

== See also ==
- Wormald Ice Piedmont, a peak on Adelaide Island, near Antarctica
- Wormald International, formerly Wormald Brothers, an Australian company
- Daniel Wormald, a fictional character in television series Better Call Saul
- Edward Wormold, a fictional character in the British soap opera Coronation Street
- James "Jim" Wormold, the main character in the Graham Greene novel Our Man in Havana
