= Kenneth Passingham =

British film writer, biographer and critic

Kenneth Passingham is a British film writer, biographer and critic. In the 1960s, he was a critic for Daily Sketch. He is the author of a biography of Sean Connery, first published in 1983, and authored a biography of Shirley Bassey in 1976. He also contributed to The Guinness Book of TV Facts and Feats in 1984.
