= Challinor =

Challinor is a family name in English, found mainly in Cheshire, Staffordshire and Shropshire in the United Kingdom. It is an occupational name from an agent derivative of Middle English chaloun (meaning "blanket"), denoting a maker of or dealer in blankets. The term is derived from Châlons-sur-Marne, in France, where blankets were made in the Middle Ages. It has been found in the US, Canada and Scotland between 1841 and 1920. Most Challinor families were found in the UK in 1891, when there were 496 Challinor families living in Staffordshire.

Challinor is the name of several people:

- Dave Challinor (born 1975), English footballer and manager
- David Challinor (1920–2008), American biologist
- Deborah Challinor (born 1959), New Zealand author and historian
- Frederick Arthur Challinor (1866–1952), English composer from Longton, Staffordshire
- Henry Challinor (1814–1882), physician and politician in Queensland, Australia
- Jack Challinor (1916–1981), English footballer
- Jim Challinor (1934–1976), English rugby league player and coach
- Joan R. Challinor, American civil servant
- Jon Challinor (born 1980), English footballer
- Raymond Challinor (1929–2011), English historian
