= Royds (surname) =

Royds is a surname, and may refer to:

- Charles Royds (1876–1931), Royal Navy officer and Assistant Commissioner "A" of the London Metropolitan Police
- Charles Royds (politician) (1827–1898), pastoralist and politician in Queensland
- Edmund Royds (1860–1946), English solicitor and Conservative Party politician
- Edmund Royds (Queensland politician) (1830–1918), politician in Queensland, Australia
- Mabel Allington Royds (1874–1941), English artist known for woodcuts
- Pam Royds (1924–2016), British publisher and children's book editor
- Percy Royds (1874–1955), British admiral and politician
- Thomas Royds (1884–1955), solar physicist
