= Wisden (surname) =

Wisden is a surname, and may refer to:

- John Wisden (1826–1884), English cricketer who launched Wisden Cricketers' Almanack
- Robert Wisden (born 1958), English actor with career in Canadian and American television
