= Jean-Louis Boissier =

French scholar, curator and artist

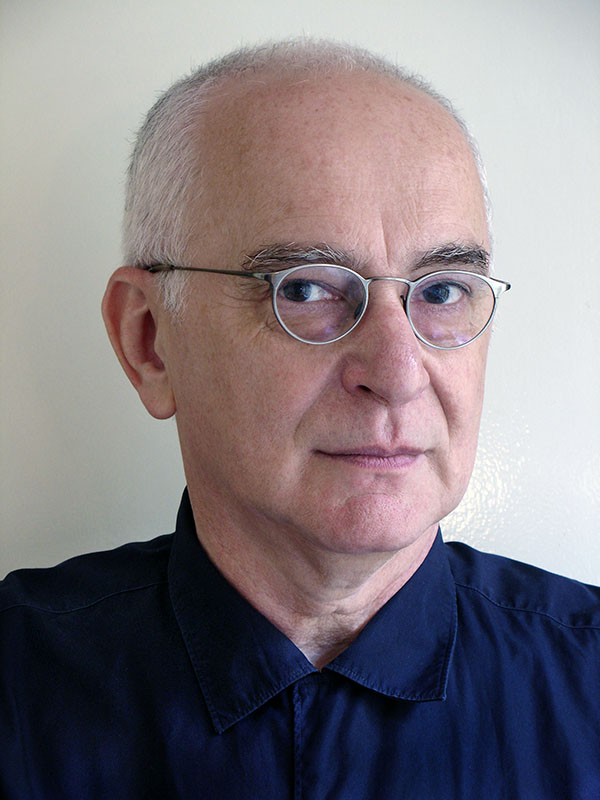
Image of Boissier Jean-Louis

Jean-Louis Boissier (born January 16, 1945, in Loriol-sur-Drôme (Drôme), is a French academic, artist, researcher, essayist and exhibition curator who focuses on the question of participation and interactivity in art. In 1969, Boissier was part of the founding team of the arts department of the Université Paris 8 Vincennes à Saint-Denis. He earned a doctorate there in 1979 with a thesis called The Question of Heritage in the Plastic Arts in China (1972-1979). Boissier focuses on the aesthetics of photographic, digital and interactive capture technology and as a professor of aesthetics and art-and-sciences research director at the University of Paris 8, he founded a team called Aesthetics of Interactivity in 1994 and Aesthetics of New Media in 2003. Since 2013, he has been professor emeritus at the Université Paris 8 Vincennes à Saint-Denis.

== Biography ==
After studying physics in Grenoble and working as a film club leader and theater photographer, Boissier turned to cinema, visual arts and art installations. In 1967 and 1968, while working as a graphic designer and scenographer at the Maison de la Culture de Grenoble, he assisted Frank Popper with his inaugural exhibition Kinetics, Spectacle, Environment. After contributing to Frank Popper's Electra exhibition at the Musée d'art moderne de la ville de Paris in 1983 and Jean-François Lyotard's Les Immatériaux exhibition at the Centre Pompidou in 1985, Boissier founded the Artifices biennial of interactive arts in Saint-Denis in 1990 and La Revue virtuelle at the Musée National d'Art Moderne in 1991.

So as to bring together more than sixty art researchers and students, he proposed the Jouable event in Paris, Geneva and Kyoto in 2002, 2003 and 2004. From 1980, he worked in the field of photography and cinema with video discs, CD ROMs and interactive art installations. His art combines the models of the book and the film. Since 1986, he has devoted himself, with Liliane Terrier, to a series of hypermedia essays on Jean-Jacques Rousseau.

== Books ==
- Faire Image, Saint-Denis, Presses universitaires de Vincennes, coll. « Les Cahiers de Paris VIII », 1989, 203 p. (ISBN 978-2-903981-57-0)
- La Relation comme forme : L'interactivité en art, Genève, Mamco, 2004, 311 p. (ISBN 978-2-940159-31-4)
- Jouable : Art, jeu et interactivité, Genève/Paris, HEAA Genève, Ensad, Paris, 2004, 365 p. (ISBN 978-2-8399-0018-8)
- La Relation comme forme : L'interactivité en art, nouvelle édition augmentée (avec un CD-Rom « Essais interactifs »), Dijon, Les Presses du réel, coll. « Mamco », 2009, 335 p. (ISBN 978-2-84066-277-8)
- Crassula ubiquiste, Média Médiums, Labex Arts H2H, Paris, 2014[1]
- L'Écran comme mobile, Genève, Mamco, 2016, 239 p. (ISBN 978-2-940159-86-4)
