= Clive (surname) =

Clive is a surname, and may refer to:

- Archer Clive (1903–1995), British Army officer
- Caroline Clive (1801–1873), English writer
- Charly Clive (born 1993), English actress
- Colin Clive (1900–1937), English stage and screen actor
- Edward Clive (judge) (1704–1771), British politician and judge
- Edward Clive (died 1845), British Member of Parliament
- Edward Clive (British Army officer) (1837–1916), soldier and politician, grandson of the above
- Edward Clive, 1st Earl of Powis (1754–1839), British peer and politician
- Edward Clive, later known as Edward Herbert, 2nd Earl of Powis (1785–1848), British peer
- E. E. Clive (1879–1940), Welsh stage actor and director
- Francis Clive-Ross (1921–1981), British publisher and author
- Geoffrey de Clive (died 1119), Bishop of Hereford
- George Clive (died 1779) (1720–1779), British politician
- George Clive (Liberal politician) (1805–1880), British barrister, magistrate and politician
- Henrietta Clive, Countess of Powis (1758–1830), British writer, mineral collector and botanist, wife of Edward Clive, 1st Earl of Powis
- Henry Clive (1883–1960), Australian magician, actor and graphic artist
- Henry Bayley Clive (1800–1870), British politician
- Jane Clive, British costume designer
- John Clive (1933–2012), English actor and author
- John Leonard Clive (1924–1990), American historian
- Kitty Clive (1711–1785), British songster and comedienne
- Lewis Clive (1910–1938), British rower
- Margaret Clive (1735–1817), British society figure, wife of Lord Clive
- Mark de Clive-Lowe (born 1974), Japanese-New Zealand musician
- Lady Mary Clive (1907–2010), British writer and historian
- Percy Clive (1873–1918), British army officer and politician
- Robert Clive (Lord Clive) (1725–1774), British officer and soldier of fortune in Bengal
- Robert Clive (1769–1833), British Member of Parliament, son of Lord Clive
- Robert Clive (1789–1854), British Member of Parliament, grandson of Lord Clive
- Robert Clive (diplomat) (1877–1948), British diplomat
- Sidney Clive (1874–1959), British Army officer
- Teagan Clive (born c.1955), American writer, bodybuilder and actress
- William Clive (1745–1825), British politician
- W. Clive-Justice (1835–1908), British Army major-general

== See also ==
- Windsor-Clive
