= Rushbrook =

Rushbrook (or Rushbrooke) is a surname, deriving from Rushbrooke in Suffolk, England. Notable people with the surname include:

- Claire Rushbrook (born 1971), English actress
- Philip Rushbrook, governor of Saint Helena, Ascension and Tristan da Cunha
- Rosalyn Rushbrook (born 1942), British author
- Selina Rushbrook (1880–1907), née Selina Ann Jenkins, was a petty criminal, prostitute and brothel keeper from Swansea, Wales
- John Gordon Rushbrooke (1936–2003), Australian particle physicist

== See also ==
- Rushbrook Williams, a historian and civil servant
- Rush Brook, a river in Pennsylvania, United States
- Rushbrooke, County Cork, Ireland
- Rushbrooke, West Suffolk, Suffolk, England
- Rushbrooke inequality, the critical exponents of a magnetic system
