= Shann =

Shann is a surname. Notable people with the surname include:

- Edward Shann (1884–1935), Australian economist
- George Shann (1876–1919), British politician
- Mick Shann (1917–1988), Australian public servant and diplomat

== See also ==
- Jay McShann (1916–2006), American jazz pianist
- Shann Ray (born 1967), American poet and novelist
- Shann Schillinger (born 1986), American football safety
