= Collyer (surname) =

Collyer is a surname, and may refer to:

- Brian Collyer (born 1961), Canadian water polo player
- Bryan Collyer (born 1962), American stock car racing driver
- Bud Collyer (1908–1969), American television game show star
- Chad Collyer (born 1974), American professional wrestler
- Daniel Collyer (1848–1924), English Anglican priest
- Francis Collyer (born 1947), English cricketer
- Gavin Collyer (born 2001), American baseball player
- Harry Collyer (born c. 1885), English footballer
- Homer Collyer (1881–1947), American hoarder
- Jaime Collyer (born 1955), Chilean writer
- John Collyer (1840–1876), English architect
- John Lyon Collyer (1893–1979), American businessman
- Joseph Collyer (1748–1827), English engraver
- June Collyer (1906–1968), American film actress
- Langley Collyer (1885–1947), American hoarder
- Laurie Collyer (born 1967), American film director and screenwriter
- Marian Shockley Collyer (1908–1981), American film actress
- Mary Collyer (c. 1716 – 1763), English translator and novelist
- Moses W. Collyer (c. 1850 – 1942), American riverboat captain
- Nora Collyer (1898–1979), Canadian modernist painter
- Oliver Collyer, British video game designer
- Paul Collyer, British video game designer
- Richard Collyer (died c. 1532), English school founder
- Robert Collyer (disambiguation), multiple people, including:
  - Robert Collyer (clergyman) (1823–1912), American Unitarian clergyman
  - Robert Hanham Collyer (1814 – c. 1891), British mesmerist
- Rosemary M. Collyer (1945–2026), American judge
- Sam Collyer (1842–1904), American bare-knuckle boxer
- Samuel Collyer (1832–1884), American machinist and firefighter
- Sarah Collyer (born 1980), English cricketer
- Toby Collyer (born 2004), English footballer
- William Collyer (disambiguation), multiple people, including:
  - William Collyer (lawyer) (1842–1928), English lawyer
  - William Collyer (Surrey cricketer) (1841–1908), English cricketer
  - William Bengo' Collyer (1782–1854), English Congregational minister and religious writer

== See also ==
- Colyer (surname)
- Collier (surname)
