= Parlby =

Parlby is a surname. Notable people with the surname include:

- Irene Parlby (1868–1965), Canadian women's farm leader, activist, and politician
- Joshua Parlby (1855–?), English football manager
- Thomas Parlby (1727–1802), British civil engineering contractor
- William Hampton Parlby (1801–1881), British Army officer
