= Fanshawe (surname) =

Fanshawe is a surname. Notable people with the surname include:

- Andy Fanshawe (1963–1992), British mountaineer
- Ann Fanshawe (1625–1680), English memoirist
- Sir Arthur Fanshawe (1794–1864), British naval officer
- Sir Arthur Dalrymple Fanshawe (1847–1936), British naval officer
- Catherine Maria Fanshawe (1765–1834), English poet
- Charles Fanshawe, 4th Viscount Fanshawe (1643–1710), MP for Mitchell
- Charles Fanshawe (c. 1817 – 1901), British military officer, List of British generals and brigadiers
- David Fanshawe (1942–2010), English composer
- Sir Edward Fanshawe (1814–1906), British naval officer
- Sir Edward Fanshawe (British Army officer) (1859–1952)
- Evelyn Fanshawe (1895–1979), in charge of the U.N. relief operation in the British Zone of Germany
- Henry Fanshawe (1634–1685), MP for Penryn
- James Fanshawe, racehorse trainer
- James Fanshawe, Royal Navy officer
- Sir Richard Fanshawe, 1st Baronet (1608–1666), English diplomat to Portugal and Spain
- Richard Fanshawe (equestrian) (1906–1988), British Olympian
- Robert Fanshawe (Royal Navy officer) (1740–1823), British naval officer and MP for Plymouth
- Robert Fanshawe (British Army officer) (1863–1946), British general
- Simon Fanshawe (born 1956), English comedian, writer and broadcaster
- Hew Dalrymple Fanshawe (1860–1957), British general
- William Fanshawe, (1583–1634), MP for Lancaster and Clitheroe
- Sir Thomas Fanshawe (1580–1631), MP for Bedford and Lancaster
- Thomas Fanshawe (of Jenkins) (1607–1651), MP for Preston and Lancaster
- Henry Fanshawe (1569–1616), Remembrancer of the Exchequer
- Thomas Fanshawe (remembrancer of the exchequer), (1533–1601), Remembrancer of the Exchequer
- Thomas Fanshawe, 1st Viscount Fanshawe (1596–1665), Remembrancer of the Exchequer
- Thomas Fanshawe, 2nd Viscount Fanshawe (1632–1674), Remembrancer of the Exchequer
