= David Thursfield =

David William Thursfield (born 10 October 1945) is a British businessman, and a former chief executive at Ford; he was also jailed for hiding his money from his divorced second wife Linda.

== Early life ==
He studied at Aston University, graduating in Production Engineering in 1965. Three years later he gained a BSc degree in Industrial Psychology in 1968.

== Career ==
=== BL ===
He was a factory manager for BL.

=== Ford ===
He moved to Ford Australia in 1979 as factory manager. From 1984 to 1992 he moved to Europe, where he was head of manufacturing for the European factories. He was the director of Body & Assembly Operations for Ford Europe. In 1994 introduced a rapid reaction system called the Lean Production and Lean Distribution System, where a car buyer could have a car ordered within 15 days. At Ford he worked with Bob Transou and Rolf Zimmerman.

In 1996 he moved to America, becoming head of manufacturing for the plants in Australia and the USA. He oversaw Halewood becoming a Jaguar plant, to make the X400, when he was in Cologne, in Germany.

At Ford he was nicknamed Darth Vader, due to his reputation for cost-cutting, and his abrasive uncompromising take-no-prisoners personality. At Ford he earned £1.2m a year. He oversaw the end of car production by Ford in the UK, when production of the Ford Fiesta ended in early 2002. From 2000 to 2004 he was Chairman of Ford in Europe, also becoming chief executive.

In June 2000, the Ford Focus became the world's most popular car, selling 228,000 in three months, being made at Saarlouis Body & Assembly, which had made one million vehicles in under two years since October 1998, with 150,000 going to the UK. Two and a half million Mondeos had been made at Genk Body & Assembly since March 1993, with 750,000 going to the UK.

In 2001 he became head of the international operations of Ford.

He retired from Ford in May 2004.

== Personal life ==
He was married to his second wife Linda for 27 years, a dental surgeon, having a daughter, divorcing on 16 April 2005. He married Rachel, his third wife in 2005.

=== Prison sentence ===
When aged 67, he was sentenced to two years in his absence to prison in November 2012 for hiding his money from his divorced second wife Linda, aged 61 in the Thursfield v Thursfield (2012) case. The case was held at the High Court of Justice (EWHC).

Business positions
Preceded by	Chairman of Ford of Europe; January 2000 – April 2004	Succeeded by
