= Edward Lombe =

Edward Lombe may refer to:

- Edward Lombe (MP) (c. 1800–1852), British MP for Arundel
- Edward Lombe (1828), a merchantman and passenger ship built in 1828
