= Thomas Hoblyn =

English cricketer and soldier

Personal information
- Full name: Thomas Hallam Hoblyn
- Born: 30 December 1835; Furneux Pelham, Hertfordshire, England
- Died: 21 December 1866 (aged 30); Rickling, Essex, England
- Batting: Unknown

Domestic team information
- Years: Team
- 1863: Marylebone Cricket Club

Career statistics
Competition	First-class
Matches	1
Runs scored	0
Batting average	0.00
100s/50s	–/–
Top score	0
Catches/stumpings	–/–
- Source: Cricinfo, 16 June 2021

Thomas Hallam Hoblyn (30 December 1835 – 21 December 1866) was an English first-class cricketer and British Army officer.

The son of Thomas Hoblyn senior, he was born in December 1835 at Furneux Pelham, Hertfordshire. He was educated at Eton College, before going up to Trinity College, Cambridge. After graduating from Cambridge, he was commissioned into the British Army as a lieutenant with the 6th Hertfordshire Rifle Volunteers in April 1860, before resigning his commission in May of the following year. Following his resignation, he moved with his wife and their infant daughter to the village Rickling in Essex. There he promoted cricket in the village and encouraged visits by the major teams of the day. Hobyln played first-class cricket for the Marylebone Cricket Club in 1863, against Cambridge University at Fenner's. He batted once in the match, being dismissed without scoring by Henry Plowden (who Hobyln had also recruited to the Rickling Green Cricket Club). In June 1865, he patented an invention for "a new or improved compound spherical rest for ornamental turning lathes." Hoblyn died at Rickling in December 1866. His death had a detrimental impact on Rickling Green's fixtures, with major teams no longer visiting the village to play fixtures following his death.
