= Edmeades =

Edmeades is a surname, and may refer to:

- Brian Edmeades (born 1941), English cricketer
- Doug Edmeades (born 1949), New Zealand soil scientist
- James Edmeades (1843–1917), British Army officer and cricketer
- Lynley Edmeades, New Zealand poet, academic and editor
