= Tempest (surname) =

Tempest is the surname of:

- Tempest family, a recusant family of northern England in the 16th and 17th centuries
  - Vane-Tempest baronets, dynasty of barons in the United Kingdom
  - Vane-Tempest-Stuarts, Marquesses of Londonderry
- Annie Tempest (born 1959), British artist and cartoonist known for the comic strip The Yuppies
- Billy Tempest (1893–1945), English footballer
- Dale Tempest (born 1963), English former footballer in Hong Kong
- Edmund Tempest (1894–1921), British First World War flying ace
- Florence Tempest (1889 – after January 1932), American comedian and dancer
- Gerard Francis Tempest (1918–2009), American painter, sculptor and architect
- Greg Tempest (born 1993), English footballer
- Joey Tempest (born 1963), Swedish rock musician
- John Tempest (disambiguation), various British Members of Parliament
- Kae Tempest (born 1985), English poet and spoken word artist
- Margaret Tempest (1892–1982), English author and artist, best known for illustrating the Little Grey Rabbit books
- Marie Tempest (1864–1942), English singer and actress
- Pierce Tempest (1653–1717), English book and print seller
- Robert Tempest, High Sheriff of Durham 1558–1562
- William Tempest (born 1987), British fashion designer
- William Tempest (politician) (1653–1700), English Member of Parliament
