= Jessel =

Jessel or Jessell is a surname. Notable people with the surname include:

- Sir Charles Jessel, (1860–1928), baronet, British barrister, magistrate and businessman
  - Jesselton, now Kota Kinabalu, Sabah, Malaysia
- David Jessel, British journalist
- George Jessel:
  - George Jessel (actor) (1898–1981), American vaudevillian
  - George Jessel (jurist) (1824–1883), British jurist
- Herbert Jessel, 1st Baron Jessel (1866–1950), British soldier and politician
- Kenneth A. Jessell, educator and 6th President of Florida International University
- Leon Jessel, German composer
- Patricia Jessel, actress
- Ray Jessel (1929–2015), American-Welsh composer
- Stephen Jessel (1943–2025), British correspondent
- Thomas Jessell, scientist
- Toby Jessel, British politician

== Fictional people ==
- Miss Jessel, a character in Henry James's The Turn of the Screw and its adaptations
