= Wollaston (surname) =

Wollaston is a surname, and may refer to:

- Alexander Luard Wollaston (1804–1874), English amateur scientist
- Ally Wollaston (born 2001), New Zealand track racing cyclist and road cyclist
- Arthur Wollaston (1865–1933), English footballer
- Belinda Wollaston (born 1983), Australian musical theatre actor
- Charles Wollaston (1849–1926), English footballer
- Charlton Wollaston (1733–1764), English physician
- Francis Wollaston (scientist) (1694–1774), Fellow of the Royal Society
- Francis Wollaston (astronomer) (1731–1815), British astronomer and Church of England priest
- Francis Wollaston (philosopher) (1762–1823), English natural philosopher and academic
- George Wollaston (1738–1826), Fellow of the Royal Society
- George Buchanan Wollaston (1814–1899), English architect, watercolourist and botanist
- Gerald Wollaston (1874–1957), English officer of arms
- Harry Wollaston (1846–1921), Australian public servant
- Herbert Arthur Buchanan-Wollaston (1878–1975), Royal Navy officer
- James Wollaston (1873–1918), English footballer
- John Wollaston (Lord Mayor) (died 1658), English merchant
- John Wollaston (clergyman) (1791–1856), Anglican cleric in Western Australia
- John Wollaston (painter), English-born American portraitist
- Richard Wollaston, English sea captain and pirate
- Sandy Wollaston (1875–1930), British explorer
- Sarah Wollaston (born 1962), British general practitioner and politician
- Thomas Vernon Wollaston (1822–1878), English entomologist and malacologist
- William Wollaston (1659–1724), English Church of England priest and philosophical writer
- William Wollaston (Ipswich MP elected 1733) (1693–1764), British Member of Parliament
- William Wollaston (Ipswich MP elected 1768) (1730–1797), British Member of Parliament
- William Hyde Wollaston (1766–1828), English chemist, physicist and Fellow of the Royal Society
