= Fetherston =

Fetherston is a surname. Notable people with the surname include:

- Erin Fetherston (born 1980), American designer
- Jim Fetherston (born 1945), American football player
- Richard Fetherston (died 1540), English Roman Catholic priest
- Fetherston baronets
