= Page-Turner =

Page-Turner can refer to:

- Sir Gregory Page-Turner, 3rd Baronet (1748–1805)
- Sir Henry Page-Turner Barron, 2nd Baronet, (1824–1900), grandson of Gregory
