= Taunton (surname) =

Taunton is a surname, and may refer to:

- Ethelred Taunton (1857–1907), English Roman Catholic priest and historical writer
- Hannah Taunton (born 1991), British paralympic athlete
- John Taunton (1769–1821), English surgeon
- Kristen Taunton (born 1977), Canadian field hockey player
- Larry Taunton (born 1967), American author
- Peter Taunton, CEO of Snap Fitness
- Sam Taunton, Australian comedian and television presenter
- Scott Taunton (born 1971), Australian media executive
- Sussan Taunton (born 1970), Chilean actress
- William de Taunton (fl. 1261), Bishop of Winchester
- William Elias Taunton (bapt.1772–1835), British judge
