= Garnault =

Garnault is a surname, and may refer to:

- Arnaud-Antoine Garnault (1745–1810), French Catholic missionary and bishop
- Jean Garnault (1925–2023), French sporting director and politician
- Paul Garnault (born 1961), Welsh actor, poet and educator
