= Dowdeswell (surname) =

Dowdeswell is a surname, and may refer to:

- Caroline Dowdeswell (born 1945), English television actress
- Charles Dowdeswell (1688–1714), English politician
- Colin Dowdeswell (born 1955), tennis player
- Elizabeth Dowdeswell (born 1944), Lieutenant Governor of the Canadian province of Ontario
- James Dowdeswell (born 1974), stand-up comedian and actor
- John Dowdeswell (1772–1851), English politician
- Louis Dowdeswell (born 1993), English jazz trumpeter
- Peter Dowdeswell (born 1940), English competitive eater
- Richard Dowdeswell (died 1673) (1601–1673), English politician
- Roger Dowdeswell (born 1944), tennis player from Zimbabwe, elder brother of Colin Dowdeswell
- William Dowdeswell (1682–1728), English politician
- William Dowdeswell (Chancellor) (1721–1775), British politician
- William Dowdeswell (British Army officer) (1760–1828), English politician
- William Edward Dowdeswell (1841–1893), English politician
- William Dowdeswell (1804–1870), English politician
