= Blofeld (surname) =

Blofeld is a surname derived from the village of Blofield in Norfolk, UK.

== Notable people with the surname ==
- Henry Blofeld (born 1939), British former sports journalist and cricket commentator
- John Blofeld (writer) (1913–1987), British writer on Asian thought and religion
- John Blofeld (judge) (1932–2025), English barrister and judge
- Nick Blofeld (born 1963), English sports businessman
- Tom Blofeld (born 1964), English writer and adventure park owner, son of John Blofeld the judge

== Fictional characters ==
- Ernst Stavro Blofeld, villain in the James Bond books and films by Ian Fleming

== See also ==
- Alex Blofield (born 1991), cricketer
