= Murray-Aynsley =

Murray-Aynsley is a surname, and may refer to:

- Charles Murray-Aynsley (1893–1967), British colonial judge
- Lord Charles Murray-Aynsley (1771–1808), English cleric, Dean of Bocking
- Hugh Murray-Aynsley (1828–1917), New Zealand politician
