= Spedding =

Spedding is a surname, and may refer to:

- Alison Spedding (born 1962), British anthropologist and fantasy author
- Charlie Spedding (born 1952), long-distance runner
- Chris Spedding (born 1944), English rock and roll and jazz guitarist
- Cory Spedding (born 1991), British singer
- David Spedding (1943-2001), Head of the British Secret Intelligence Service
- Frank Spedding (1902-1984), American chemist
- James Spedding (1808-1881), English author
- Jim Spedding (1912-1982), former professional footballer
- Sam Spedding (21st century), English actor and comedian
- Scott Spedding (born 1986), South African-born French rugby union player
- Duncan Spedding (born 1977), former British professional footballer
- Merlin Spedding Unwin (born 1954), British book publisher
