= Tom Hoblyn =

British garden designer

Tom Hoblyn is a British garden designer. He has been awarded one gold, two silver and three silver-gilt medals at the Chelsea Flower Show since 2008, as well as the RHS People’s Choice Award for The Arthritis Research UK Garden 2012.

Hoblyn trained at the Royal Botanic Gardens, Kew and set up his company Thomas Hoblyn Garden Design Ltd in 2002. In 2012, he was commissioned to restore the gardens of the former Hunting Lodge of Edward and Mrs Simpson and was part of the design team that restored the house and grounds of Hillersdon House.

Hoblyn has written articles for Gardens Illustrated, The English Garden and Country Living magazines. From 2011 to 2014 he contributed the monthly Diary of a Garden Designer blog for The Guardian and has blogged for the BBC Gardening website.

Hoblyn’s 2011 Chelsea Flower Show garden was relocated to the Eden Project in Cornwall.
