= Waddon (surname) =

Waddon is a surname, and may refer to:

- John Waddon (Parliamentarian) (born 1591), English Member of Parliament for Plymouth
- John Waddon (died 1695) (c.1649–1695), English Member of Parliament for Saltash
- Rik Waddon (born 1977), British paralympic cyclist
