= Monck (surname) =

Monck is a surname, and may refer to:

- Adrian Monck (born 1965), English academic, writer and journalist
- Sir Arthur Monck, 7th Baronet (1838–1933), British Member of Parliament
- Charles Monck (1678–1751), Irish MP for Newcastle and Inistiogue
- Charles Monck, 1st Viscount Monck (1754–1802), Irish nobleman
- Charles Monck, 3rd Viscount Monck (1791–1849), Irish nobleman
- Charles Monck, 4th Viscount Monck (1819–1894), Governor General of Canada
- Sir Charles Monck, 6th Baronet (1779–1867), English nobleman
- Chip Monck (born 1939), American lighting designer and emcee at the 1969 Woodstock Festival
- Christopher Monck, 2nd Duke of Albemarle (1653–1688), English statesman and soldier
- Elizabeth Monck, Duchess of Albemarle (1654–1734), spouse of the 2nd Duke of Albermarle
- Francis Ward Monck (born 1842), British clergyman and discredited spiritualist medium
- George Monck, 1st Duke of Albemarle (1608–1670), English soldier and naval officer
- Henry Monck, 1st Earl of Rathdowne and 2nd Viscount Monck (1785–1848), Irish nobleman
- Jack Monck (born 1950), British musician
- John Monck (courtier) (1883–1964), English Marshal of the Diplomatic Corps
- John Monck (cricketer) (1845–1929), New Zealand farmer and cricketer
- John Monck (film producer) (1908–1999), British film executive, known also as John Goldman
- John Stanley Monck (1721/2–1785), Irish Anglican priest
- Mary Monck (c.1677–1715), Irish poet
- Nicholas Monck (c.1610–1661), Bishop of Hereford
- Nicholas Monck (civil servant) (1935–2013), English civil servant
- Thomas Monck (1570–1627), English Member of Parliament
- Walter Nugent Monck (1877–1958), English theatre director
- William Domville Stanley Monck (1763–1840), Anglo-Irish politician
- William Henry Stanley Monck (1839–1915), Irish astronomer and philosopher

== See also ==
- Monk (surname)
