= Allgood =

Allgood is a surname, and may refer to:

- Andrew Perry Allgood (1816–1882), American businessman
- Chris Allgood, American politician
- Clarence W. Allgood (1902–1991), American judge
- Jill Allgood (1910–1995), British BBC producer, author and film director
- Justin Allgood (born 1983), American football player
- Lancelot Allgood (1711–1782), British landowner and politician
- Miles C. Allgood (1878–1977), American politician
- Mitchell Allgood (born 1989), Australian rugby league footballer
- Sam Allgood, American economist
- Sara Allgood (1880–1950), Irish-American actress
- Thomas Allgood (senior), inventor of the Pontypool japan process
- Thomas F. Allgood (1928–2000), American politician
- William B. Allgood (1868–1933), Alabama state official

== See also ==
- Allgood, Alabama
- All Good Music Festival
