= Cookson =

Cookson is an English surname. Notable people with the surname include:

- Henry Cookson (born 1975), British explorer and adventurer
- Brian Cookson (born 1951), British cyclist, and president of British Cycling
- Dame Catherine Cookson (1906–1998), English romance novelist
- Edgar Christopher Cookson (1883–1915), British naval officer, awarded the Victoria Cross
- Harry Cookson (1869–1922), English footballer
- Isaac Cookson (foundryman) (1679–1743), English industrialist, founder of the Cookson Group
- Isaac Cookson (politician) (1817–1870), merchant and New Zealand politician
- Oliver Cookson (born 1979), British entrepreneur, founder of Myprotein
- Peter Cookson (1913–1990), American movie actor
- Phil Cookson (born 1951), English rugby league footballer
- Rob Cookson (born 1961), Canadian professional ice hockey coach
- Jack Cookson (1928–2021), Canadian politician
- Sally Cookson, British theatre director
- Sam Cookson (English footballer) (1896–1955)
- Sam Cookson (Welsh footballer) (1891–1974)
- Sophie Cookson (born 1990), English actress
- Walter Cookson (1879–1948), English footballer
