= Freshfield (surname) =

Freshfield is an English surname, notably of the family that founded the law firm Freshfields. The name is not derived from Freshfield, a suburb of Formby, Merseyside, which was named in the mid-nineteenth century. People with the surname Freshfield include:

- Charles Freshfield (1808–1891), British lawyer and Member of Parliament
- Douglas Freshfield (1845–1934), British lawyer, mountaineer and author, son of Henry Ray and Jane
- Henry Ray Freshfield (1814–1895), British lawyer and conservationist, husband of Jane, father of Douglas
- James William Freshfield (1774–1864), British lawyer and Member of Parliament
- Jane Freshfield (1814–1901), English climber and travel writer, wife of Henry Ray, mother of Douglas
