= Barnardiston (surname) =

Barnardiston is a surname. Notable people with the surname include:

- Nathaniel Barnardiston (1588–1653), English politician and Member of Parliament
- Sir Samuel Barnardiston, 1st Baronet (1620–1707), English Whig Member of Parliament and deputy governor of the East India Company; son of Nathaniel Barnardiston
- Sir Samuel Barnardiston, 2nd Baronet (1659–1709), English Member of Parliament and barrister
- Sir Thomas Barnardiston, 1st Baronet (died 1669), English Member of Parliament; son of Nathaniel Barnardiston
- Sir Thomas Barnardiston, 2nd Baronet (c. 1646–1698), English Member of Parliament; son of Thomas Barnardiston, 1st Baronet
- Thomas Barnardiston (legal writer) (died 1752), English barrister and legal reporter

== See also ==
- Barnardiston baronets, two extinct titles in the Baronetage of England
- Barnardiston family (medieval aristocracy), English medieval landholders
