= Pennyman =

Pennyman may refer to:

- Mary Pennyman (1631–1701), English religious polemicist
- John Pennyman (1628–1706), Quaker schismatic and husband of Mary
- Pennyman baronets, holders of one of two baronetcies created for members of the Pennyman family
  - Sir William Pennyman, 1st Baronet (1607–1643), English landowner, soldier, and politician
  - Sir James Pennyman, 6th Baronet (1736–1808), British politician
