= Perrins =

Surname list/set index

Perrins may refer to:

- Charles William Dyson Perrins (1864–1958), English businessman, bibliophile and philanthropist
- Chris Perrins, LVO, FRS (born 1935), British biologist
- George Perrins (1873 – unknown) was an English footballer
- Isaac Perrins, English bareknuckle prizefighter and 18th-century engineer
- Leslie Perrins (1901–1962), English actor who often played villains
- Wesley Perrins, MBE (1905–1990), English trade unionist and Labour Party politician from Stourbridge
- William Henry Perrins (1793–1867), drug-store chemist who formed a partnership in 1823 with John Wheeley Lea

== See also ==
- Dyson Perrins CofE Academy, co-educational secondary school with academy status in Malvern, Worcestershire, England
- Dyson Perrins Laboratory, organic chemistry research laboratory in the University of Oxford, 1916–2003
- Perrins Corners, Ontario in eastern Ontario, Canada
- Lea & Perrins, United Kingdom based food division of the H.J. Heinz Company, originating in Worcester, England
- Perrin (disambiguation)
