= Steedman (surname) =

Steedman is a surname, and may refer to:

- Alasdair Steedman (1922–1992), senior commander in the Royal Air Force
- Bertha Steedman (1866–1945), British tennis player
- Carl Steedman (born 1973), British Royal Navy officer
- Carolyn Steedman (born 1947), British historian
- Daniel Steedman (born 2000), Scottish footballer
- George Fox Steedman (1871–1940), American businessman
- Henry Steedman (1866–1953), Scottish-born Australian botanist
- Ian Steedman (born 1941), British economist
- James B. Steedman (1817–1883), American soldier, printer and politician
- Mark Steedman (born 1946), British computational linguist and cognitive scientist
- Mary Steedman (1867–1921), British tennis player
- Neville Steedman (born 1957), Irish soccer player
- Nicola Steedman, British medical doctor
- Peggy Steedman (1905–1975), Scottish chess master
- Peter Steedman (1943–2024), Australia politician
- Robert Scott Steedman (born 1958), British engineer
- Shirley Steedman (born 1949), British actor
- Tony Steedman (1927–2001), British actor
- Trevor Steedman (1954–2016), British actor and stuntman

== See also ==
- Steadman (surname)
- Stedman (surname)
