= Locock =

Locock is a surname. Notable people with the surname include:

- Locock Baronets
- Charles Locock (1799–1875), 1st Baronet, obstetrician to Queen Victoria
- Charles Dealtry Locock (1862–1946), British literary scholar, editor, and translator

== See also ==
- Lowcock
