= Middlemore (surname) =

Middlemore is a surname, and may refer to:

- Amphilis Throckmorton Middlemore (1891–1931), daughter of Sir John Middlemore
- George Middlemore (died 1850), British Army officer and politician
- Henry Middlemore (died 1592), English courtier
- Humphrey Middlemore (died 1535), English Catholic priest and Carthusian hermit
- John Middlemore (1844–1924), baronet, politician, brother of Thomas Middlemore
- Maria Trinidad Howard Sturgis Middlemore (1846–1890), author, wife of Samuel George Chetwynd Middlemore]
- Mary Middlemore (died 1618), English courtier
- Samuel George Chetwynd Middlemore (1848–1890), English translator and journalist
- Thomas Middlemore (1842–1923), English mountaineer and head of Middlemores Saddles
