= Naper (surname) =

Naper is a surname, and may refer to:

- Ella Naper (1886–1972), English jeweller, potter, designer and painter
- Erling Naper (born 1936), Norwegian banker and civil servant
- James Naper (1825–1901), Anglo-Irish farmer and cricketer
- Joseph Naper (1798–1862) American pioneer and businessman in Illinois

== See also ==
- Napier (surname)
