= Cazalet =

Cazalet is a surname. Notable people with the surname include:

- Auguste Cazalet (1938–2013), French politician
- Sir Edward Cazalet (born 1936), British judge
- Edward Cazalet (merchant) (1827–1883), British merchant and industrialist
- Clement Cazalet (1869–1950), British tennis player
- Hal Cazalet (born 1969), English tenor opera singer
- Lara Cazalet (born 1973), English actress
- Peter Cazalet (Royal Navy officer) (1899–1982), English admiral
- Peter Cazalet (racehorse trainer) (1907–1973) English cricketer, jockey, racehorse owner and trainer
- Thelma Cazalet-Keir (1899–1989), British feminist and politician
- Colonel Victor Cazalet (1896–1943), British politician
- William Marshall Cazalet (1865–1932), British socialite and tennis player

== See also ==
- The Cazalets, a 2001 British television drama series
- Puyol-Cazalet, a commune in the Landes department, Aquitaine, southwest France
