= Player (surname) =

Player is a surname, and may refer to:

- Allen Player (1893–1962), New Zealand cricketer
- Ben Player, Australian bodyboarder
- Bradley Player (born 1967), South African cricketer
- Edith Amelia Player, married name Edith Player Brown (1907–1999), American musician and artist, sister of Willa Beatrice Player
- Gary Player (born 1935), South African golfer
- Ian Player (1927–2014), South African international conservationist
- Jessica Player (born 1982), American actress
- Mary Player (c.1857–1924), New Zealand midwife, feminist and social reformer
- Michael Player (1960–1986), American serial killer
- Nasir Player (born 1997), American football player
- Roy Player (1928–1992), English footballer
- Scott Player (born 1969), American football player
- T-Dre Player (born 1992), Canadian football player
- Willa Beatrice Player (1909–2003), American educator and civil rights activist
