= Flatt =

Flatt is a surname, and may refer to:

- Bruce Flatt (born 1965), Canadian businessman
- Ernie Flatt (1918–1995), American choreographer and dancer
- Johann Friedrich Flatt (1759–1821), German theologian and philosopher
- John Ira Flatt (1834–1913), Canadian farmer, merchant and politician
- Jonathan Flatt (born 1994), English footballer
- Lester Flatt (1914–1979), American bluegrass musician, guitarist and mandolinist
- Matthew Flatt, American computer scientist
- Rachael Flatt (born 1992), American figure skater
- Roy Flatt (1947–2011), English clergyman

== See also ==
- Flatt (landform), a heathland pond, typical of North Germany
