= Cass (surname) =

Cass is the surname of:

- Amelia Cass (born 1999), British para-cyclist
- Annie Cass, later Annie Pearson, Viscountess Cowdray (1860–1932), British philanthropist and suffragist
- Barbara Cass-Beggs (1904–1990), Canadian folk song collector, singer and teacher
- Bettina Cass (born 1940), Australian sociologist and social policy adviser
- Brian Cass (born 1947), British business executive
- David Cass (1937–2008), American economist
- Dick Cass (born 1946), President of the National Football League's Baltimore Ravens
- Eleanor Baldwin Cass (1874–1966), American fencer
- Frank Cass (1930–2007), British publisher of books and academic journals
- Frederick Cass (1913–2000), Canadian politician
- Geoffrey Cass (born 1932), British publisher
- George Washington Cass (1810–1888), American industrialist and president of the Northern Pacific Railway
- Godfrey Cass (1867–1951), Australian actor
- Harriet Cass (born 1952), British radio broadcaster
- Henry Cass (1902–1989), English film director
- Hilary Cass, British physician
- John Cass (1661–1718), English politician and philanthropist
- Lewis Cass (1782–1866), American Democratic presidential nominee in 1848, Secretary of State, Secretary of War, Michigan Governor
- Lewis Cass Jr. (1814–1878), American diplomat
- Maurice Cass (1884–1954), character actor
- Melnea Cass (1896–1978), American community and civil rights activist
- Moss Cass (1927–2022), Australian former politician
- Oren Cass (born 1983), American public policy commentator and political advisor
- Peggy Cass (1924–1999), American actress, comedian and game show panelist
- Robin Cass Canadian film and television producer
- Rodney Cass (1940–2018), English cricketer
- Ronald Cass (1923–2004), screenwriter and composer
- Thomas Cass (colonel) (1821–1862), Union colonel in the American Civil War
- Thomas Cass (surveyor) (1817–1895), pioneer surveyor in New Zealand
