= Dowson =

Dowson is a surname. Notable people with the surname include:

== Real people ==
- Anne Lagacé Dowson, Canadian broadcaster and politician
- David Dowson (born 1988), English footballer
- Duncan Dowson (1928–2020), British engineer and professor emeritus at University of Leeds
- Edward Dowson (cricketer, born 1838) (1838–1922), English cricketer
- Edward Dowson (cricketer, born 1880) (1880–1933), English cricketer
- Ernest Dowson (1867–1900), British poet
- James "Jim" Dowson (born 1964), British far-right political activist
- John Dowson (1820–1881), historian of India
- Murray Dowson (1915–?), Canadian Trotskyist
- Phil Dowson (born 1981), English rugby player
- Philip Dowson (1924–2014), British architect
- Ross Dowson (1918–2002), Canadian Trotskyist

== Fictional characters ==
- Kenny Dowson (肯尼道森), a character in the Taiwanese television series Port of Lies (八尺門的辯護人).

== See also ==
- Dawson (disambiguation)
