= Warde =

Warde is a surname. Notable people with the surname include:

- Andrew Warde, colonist, judge and farmer
- Anthony Warde, actor
- Beatrice Warde, typographer
- Sir Charles Warde, 1st Baronet, politician
- Ephrem Warde (born 1977), Lebanese-born Syriac Catholic bishop
- Ernest C. Warde, director
- Frederic Warde, typographer
- Frederick Warde, actor
- Geoffrey Warde, priest
- George Warde, army officer
- John William Warde
- H. M. A. Warde, soldier and police officer
- Harlan Warde, actor
- Luke Warde, sea captain
- Mary Francis Xavier Warde, nun
- Richard Warde, politician
- Willie Warde, actor
