= James Hay Upcher =

English-born clergyman (1854–1931)

James Hay Upcher (b Wreningham 17 January 1854 – d Harare 17 March 1931) was Archdeacon of Mashonaland from 1925 until his death.

Upcher was educated at Trinity College, Cambridge was ordained deacon in 1877 and Priest in 1878. After curacies in Halesworth, Sudbourne, Barnham Broom and Bury St Edmunds he held incumbencies at Sprowston, and Sculthorpe. He was a missionary at St Bernard's Mission, Selukwe from 1923 to 1925; and Priest in charge of St Mary, Hunyani from 1927 until his death.
