= Anwyl-Passingham =

Anwyl-Passingham is a surname, and may refer to:

- Augustus Anwyl-Passingham (1880–1955), British soldier, recruiting officer
- Robert Townshend Anwyl-Passingham (1867–1926), British military police officer in colonial Burma, father of Augustus
