= Blackburne (name) =

Blackburne is a surname. Notable people with the surname include:

- Anna Blackburne (1726–1793), English botanist
- Anna Blackburne-Rigsby (born Anna Blackburne, 1961), American judge
- Francis Blackburne (1782–1867), Lord Chancellor of Ireland
- Harry Blackburne DSO, MC (1878–1963), an Anglican clergyman
- John Blackburne (botanist) (1694–1786), English businessman and botanist, father of Anna
- John Ireland Blackburne (1783–1874), MP for Newton (1807–1818) and Warrington (1835–1847)
- John Ireland Blackburne (1817–1893), MP for South West Lancashire 1875–1885
- Joseph Henry Blackburne (1841–1921), British chess master
- Lancelot Blackburne (1658–1743), English clergyman, Archbishop of York, purported pirate
- Lena Blackburne (1886–1968), American Major League baseball player and manager
