= De Chair =

De Chair or de Chair is a surname, and may refer to:

- Dudley de Chair (1864–1958), British admiral and Governor of New South Wales
- Enid de Chair (1879–1966), First Lady of New South Wales, art patron and artist
- Somerset de Chair (1911–1995), English author, politician and poet
- Helena Rees-Mogg (née de Chair, born 1977), television personality and daughter of Somerset de Chair
