= Gidley =

Gidley is a surname. Notable people with the surname include:

- Charles Gidley Wheeler (born 1938), television screenwriter and historical novelist
- Hogan Gidley, executive director of the South Carolina Republican Party
- James W. Gidley (1866–1931), American paleontologist
- Kurt Gidley (born 1982), professional Australian footballer and captain of the Newcastle Knights in the NRL
- Mark Gidley, Member of the Alabama House of Representatives
- Martyn Gidley (born 1968), English first class cricketer who played in England and South Africa
- Matthew Gidley (born 1977), Australian professional rugby league footballer for St Helens RLFC of the Super League competition
- Memo Gidley (born 1970), Mexican-American racing driver of German and Canadian ancestry
- Pamela Gidley (1965–2018), American actress and model
- Philip Gidley King RN (1758–1808), British naval officer and colonial administrator
- Sandra Gidley (born 1957), Liberal Democrat politician in the United Kingdom
