= Napper =

Napper is a surname. Notable people with the surname include:

- Edwin Napper (1815–1895), English cricketer
- George Napper (1550–1610), English Catholic priest
- Larry C. Napper (born 1947), American diplomat
- Robert Napper (born 1966), British serial killer
- James Napper Tandy (1739–1803), Irish rebel leader
