= Puckle =

Puckle is a surname. Notable people with the surname include:

- Giles Puckle (born 1979), English cricketer
- James Puckle (1667–1724), English inventor, lawyer, and writer
  - Puckle gun, a flintlock revolver

== See also ==
- Pückler
