= Plumer =

Plumer is a surname. Notable people with the surname include:

- Arnold Plumer (1801–1869), member of the U.S. House of Representatives from Pennsylvania
- B. G. Plumer (1830–1886), American politician and businessman
- Daniel L. Plumer (1837–1920), American politician and businessman
- George Plumer (1762–1843), member of the U.S. House of Representatives from Pennsylvania
- Henry Plumer McIlhenny (1910–1986), American connoisseur of art and antiques, world traveller and socialite
- Herbert Plumer, 1st Viscount Plumer (1857–1932), British colonial official and soldier
- Lincoln Plumer (1875–1928), American silent film actor
- Marie-France Plumer (born 1943), French actress
- PattiSue Plumer (born 1962), American retired long-distance runner
- Polly Plumer, American track and field athlete
- Robert Plumer Ward (1765–1846), British novelist and politician
- Rose Plumer (1876–1955), American actress
- Thomas Plumer (1753–1824), British judge and politician
- Thomas Plumer Halsey (1815–1854), Member of Parliament for Hertfordshire
- William Plumer (disambiguation)

== See also ==
- Plummer (surname)
