= Thomas Mytton (died c. 1563) =

English politician

Thomas Mytton (ca. 1530 – 1563?) was an English politician.

He was a member (MP) of the parliament of England for Shrewsbury in November 1554.
