= Amphlett =

Amphlett is a surname. Notable people with the surname include:

- Christina Amphlett (1959–2013), the lead singer of Australian rock band Divinyls
- Edgar Amphlett (1867–1931), British fencer and journalist
- Patricia Amphlett (born 1949), Australian singer whose stage name was Little Pattie
- Richard Amphlett (1809–1883), English barrister and Conservative politician
- Tommy Amphlett (born 1988), English-born association football player

== See also ==
- Amphilestes
- Neauphlette
