= Mirehouse (surname) =

Mirehouse is a British surname. Notable people with the surname include:

- George Mirehouse (1863–1923), English cricketer
- William Mirehouse (1844–1925), English cricketer

First found in Cumberland, this Saxon surname survived with variations including: Miresike, Mirehouse, Mirus, Mirehous, as well as others.

== See also ==
- Morehouse (surname)
