= Hayter (surname) =

Hayter is a surname. Notable people with the surname include:

- Adrian Hayter (1914–1990), New Zealand soldier, sailor, Antarctic leader and author
- Alethea Hayter (1911–2006), English writer
- Arthur Hayter, 1st Baron Haversham (1835–1917), British politician
- Charles Hayter (1761–1835), English miniature painter
- Charles Hayter (secretary) (died 1948), Australian football club manager and secretary
- Charles Hayter, a minor character in the novel Persuasion by Jane Austen
- David Hayter (born 1969), Canadian-American actor and screenwriter
- Ernest Hayter (1913–2005), English cricketer
- Ethan Hayter (born 1998), British racing cyclist
- George Hayter (1792–1871), English painter
- Harrison Hayter (1825–1898), British engineer
- Henry Heylyn Hayter (1821–1895), Australian statistician
- Jack Hayter, British musician
- James Hayter (actor) (1907–1983), British actor
- James Hayter (footballer) (born 1979), English footballer
- James Hayter (rugby union) (born 1978), English former rugby union player
- Joanna Hayter, Australian gender equality advocate and humanitarian aid worker
- John Hayter (1800–1895), English painter
- John Hayter (antiquary) (1756–1818), English churchman and academic
- Kezia Hayter (1818–1885), Australian prison reformer
- Kristin Hayter (born 1986), American singer and multi-instrumentalist
- L. A. Hayter (1893–1917), English children's illustrator and writer
- Lou Hayter, British Musician
- Montague Hayter (1871–1948), English cricketer
- Paul Hayter (born 1942), senior British civil servant
- Sean Hayter, Australian musician with the band Lucius Hunt
- Stanley William Hayter (1901–1988), British painter
- Sir William Hayter, 1st Baronet (1792–1878), British barrister and politician
- William Hayter (diplomat) (1906–1995), British diplomat, ambassador to the Soviet Union and author
- William Hayter (priest) (1858–1935), British dean and teacher

Alfie Hayter (2005 _ present) ‚a pro wrestler called king Alfie also from Portsmouth England

== See also ==
- George Albert Bazaine-Hayter (1843–1914), French general
