= Moor (surname) =

Moor is a surname. Notable people with the surname include:

- Andy Moor (guitarist) (born 1962), guitarist of the Ex
- Andy Moor (producer) (born 1980), producer and DJ
- Ben Moor (American football) (fl. 1970s), American football coach
- Ben Moor (writer) (born 1969), English writer
- Davey Ray Moor, Australian songwriter, singer, composer and producer
- David Moor (1947–2000), British general practitioner who was prosecuted for the euthanasia of a patient
- David Moor (cricketer) (born 1934), English cricketer
- Dmitry Moor (1883–1946), professional name of Dmitry Stakhievich Orlov, Russian artist
- Drew Moor (born 1984), American soccer player
- Edward Moor (1771–1848), British soldier and Indologist
- Els Moor (1937–2016), Surinamese educator, editor and book publisher
- Emánuel Moór (1863–1931), Hungarian composer
- Felix Moor (1903–1955), Estonian journalist and actor
- George Moor (1896–1918), British Army officer awarded the Victoria Cross
- Henry Moor (1809–1877), Mayor of Melbourne
- Ian Moor (born 1974), English singer
- James Moor (classicist) (1712–1779), Scottish classical scholar
- James H. Moor (1942–2024), American philosopher
- Justus Moor (born 1987), German politician
- Karl Moor (1853–1932), Swiss communist
- Lova Moor (born 1946), French dancer, real name Marie-Claude Jourdain
- Marie Möör, French singer
- Paul Moor (born 1978), British ten-pin bowler
- Peter Moor (born 1991), Zimbabwean cricketer
- Terry Moor (born 1952), American tennis player
- William Moor (died 1765), Canadian sailor and explorer
- Wyman Moor (1811–1869), American politician

== See also ==
- De Moor, a Dutch surname
- Moore (surname)
  - List of people with surname Moore
- More (surname)
