= Caudle (surname) =

Caudle is a surname. Notable people with the surname include:

- Bob Caudle (1930–2025), American wrestling announcer
- Cathy Caudle (born c. 1961), Canadian curler
- Daryl Caudle (born 1963), United States Navy admiral
- Reece Caudle (1888–1955), American politician
