= Biddell =

Biddell is a surname. Notable people with the surname include:

- Sir George Biddell Airy (1801–1892), English mathematician and astronomer
- Kerrie Biddell (1947–2014), Australian jazz singer, pianist, and vocal teacher
- William Biddell (1825–1900), English politician

== See also ==
- Bidwell (surname)
