= Sarah Lockett =

Sarah Lockett (born in Surrey) is an English television news presenter, reporter and journalist.

== Career ==
Lockett started out recording 0898 information telephone lines, before working for Capital Radio, London. Lockett then became a TV news anchor and reporter, who has worked for Sky News, Channel Four News, BBC News 24, ITN and Forces TV. She has also written for newspapers including The Scotsman (for 18 months). Lockett has written articles for various magazines alongside her broadcast news career and she also has a food/cooking blog at Money Magpie

== Stalker ==
In January 2000 a 30-year-old man was jailed for 30 months for stalking Lockett. He wrote some 80 letters, stalked the Meridian studios, and tried to find out her home address. He told Lockett: "Every celebrity needs a stalker." The court case preceded cases involving Emily Maitlis and Julia Somerville.

== Career history ==
- 1987 - 0898 telephone services + local radio.
- 1988 - Capital Radio, London
- 1991/2001 - BBC Newsroom Southeast
- 1994-96 - ITN/Channel4: inc 'House to House', 'The Big Breakfast', and 'Channel4 News'. 'ITN Morning News' (as Reporter and Producer). Channel 5 News
- 1995-1996 - Reuters Business TV
- 1998-2000 - Meridian TV: anchor of the local evening news programme, "Meridian Tonight"
- 2000-2002 - Freelance, incl Sky News, Channel 4 News, BBC News24
- 2004 – Local Government Channel (presenter), corporate TV reporter/presenter, Conference facilitator
- 2010-2011 BBC London News (presenter cover), Websedge TV (media trainer)
- 2010-present - ITN Productions (presenter/reporter), ITN Industry News (presenter/reporter), The Business Channel (presenter), Topline Communications (Presenter, media trainer)
- 2014-present Forces TV News (reporter), Media Training Associates (trainer), ITN Industry News, The Business Channel

=== Books ===
- The Dish (2009), with Penny Isaacs
- Feed Your Family for Less (2010)

=== Newspapers & Magazines ===
Specialises in writing health, food & diet features and humour, and is a member of the Guild of Food Writers.

- London Evening Standard
- The Scotsman: wrote a daily cookery column for 18 months (2000–2001)
- The Sunday Post
- Healthy magazine
- Shape magazine
