= Ladds =

Ladds is a surname, and may refer to:

- Brent Ladds (born 1951), Canadian ice hockey administrator
- Dulcie Dunlop Ladds (1906–1972), Australian author, poet and playwright
- John Ladds (1835–1926), English architect
- Robert Ladds (born 1941), English Anglican bishop

== See also ==
- Ladd (surname)
