= Colyer (surname) =

Colyer is a surname, and may refer to:

- Douglas Colyer (1893-1978), British air marshal
- Evelyn Colyer later Munro (1902–1930), British tennis player
- Frank Colyer (1866–1954), British dental surgeon and dental historian
- Geoffrey Colyer (born 1931), British canoe sprinter
- Ingrid Colyer (born 1993), Australian netball player
- Jacobus Colyer (1657–1725), Dutch politician and diplomat
- James Colyer (c.1560–1597), English Member of Parliament
- Jeff Colyer (born 1960), American surgeon and politician; 47th Governor of Kansas
- Justinus Colyer (c. 1624–1682), Dutch politician and diplomat
- Ken Colyer (1928–1988), English trad jazz trumpeter and cornetist
- Kitty Colyer (1881–1972), British music hall performer and politician
- Steve Colyer (born 1979), American baseball relief pitcher
- Thomas Riversdale Colyer-Fergusson (1896−1917), British Army officer
- Tom Colyer (1883–1956), British socialist activist
- Travis Colyer (born 1991), Australian rules footballer
- Vincent Colyer (1825–1888), American artist noted for his images of the American West
- Wilbur E. Colyer (1898–1918), American soldier of World War I who received the Medal of Honor

== See also ==
- Collyer (surname)
