= Crawfurd =

Crawfurd, a variant of Crawford, is a surname. Notable people with the name include:

- Archibald Crawfurd (1785–1843), Scottish poet
- George Crawfurd (also Crawford) (1681–1748), Scottish genealogist and historian
- Helen Crawfurd (1877–1954), Scottish suffragette, Rent Strike organiser, Communist activist and politician
- Horace Crawfurd (1881–1958), Liberal Party politician in the United Kingdom
- John Crawfurd FRS (1783–1868), Scottish physician, colonial administrator and diplomat, and author
- John Crawfurd (cricketer) (1878–1939), Irish cricketer
- Lionel Crawfurd (1864–1934), the second Suffragan Bishop of Stafford
- Oswald John Frederick Crawfurd CMG (1834–1909), English journalist, man of letters and diplomat
- Captain Thomas Crawfurd of Jordanhill (1530–1603), of Jordanhill, husband of Mary, Queen of Scots
- Thomas Crawfurd of Cartsburn, 1st Baron of Cartsburn

== See also ==
- Crawfurd Adamson (born 1953), noted figurative artist from Edinburgh
- Gibbs Crawfurd Antrobus (1793–1861), British diplomat and politician
- Crawfurd Wilfred Griffin Eady GCMG KCB KBE (1890–1962), British Treasury official and diplomat
