= Littledale (surname) =

Littledale is a surname, and may refer to:

- Clara Littledale (1891–1956), American magazine journalist
- Harold Littledale (1853–1930), British literary scholar and naturalist in India
- Harold A. Littledale (1885–1957), American journalist
- Joseph Littledale (1767–1842), British judge
- Richard Frederick Littledale (1833–1890), Anglo-Irish clergyman and writer
- Ronald Littledale (1902–1944), British Army officer and POW
- St. George Littledale (1851–1931), English explorer of Central Asia
- Thomas Littledale (1850–1938), British Olympic sailor
