= Perens =

Perens or Peren is a surname, and may refer to:

- Bruce Perens (born c.1958), American computer programmer and free software advocate
- Geoffrey Peren (1892–1980), British agricultural scientist and academic
- Johannes Perens (1906–1941), Estonian politician
