= Reddie =

Reddie is a surname. Notable people with the surname include:

- Anthony G. Reddie (born 1964), British theologian and academic
- Cecil Reddie (1858–1932), English educationalist
- James Campbell Reddie (1807–1878), British solicitor, collector and author of erotica
- John Reddie (1805–1851), Scottish lawyer and colonial judge
