= Trotman =

Trotman is a surname. Notable people with the surname include:

- Alexander Trotman, Baron Trotman (1933–2005), Ford Motor Company's first foreign-born chairman and CEO
- Sir Aubrey Trotman-Dickenson (1926–2016), British chemist and academic administrator
- David Trotman (born 1951), mathematician, with dual British and French nationality
- Dawson Trotman (1906–1956), evangelist, crusader and founder of The Navigators
- Ebenezer Trotman (died 1865), architect of churches and railway stations
- Emmerson Trotman (born 1954), former West Indies cricketer who played for the Rebel West Indies side in South Africa
- James Trotman (born 1979), British tennis player and coach
- Lloyd Trotman (1923–2007), jazz bassist born in Boston who backed numerous jazz, dixieland, doo-wop and R&B artists
- Mickey Trotman (1974–2001), football player from Trinidad and Tobago
- Neal Trotman (born 1987), English association footballer
- Raphael Trotman (born 1966), lawyer and a politician in Guyana
- Tyra Trotman, Barbadian politician
- Roman Trotman (born 2003), Roblox game developer, also known as RVVZ
