= Dendy (surname) =

Dendy is a surname, and may refer to:

- Arthur Dendy (1865–1925), English zoologist
- Edward Stephen Dendy (1812–1864), English officer of arms
- Edward Dendy (regicide), 17th century English regicide
- Henry Dendy (1800–1881), founder of Brighton, Melbourne, Australia
- LaRon Dendy (born 1988), American basketball player
- Marquis Dendy (born 1992), American track and field athlete
- Mary Dendy (1855–1933), promoter of residential schools for mentally handicapped people
- Norris Dendy, victim of the 1933 lynching of Norris Dendy
- Patrick Dendy (born 1982), American football player
- Terri Dendy (born 1965), American track and field athlete
- Walter Cooper Dendy (1794–1871), English surgeon and writer
