= Godden =

Godden is a surname. Notable people with the surname include:

- Brad Godden (born 1969), Australian rugby player
- Edwin J. Godden (1888–1979), English-born businessman and political figure in Newfoundland
- Ernie Godden (born 1961), Canadian ice hockey player
- Gertrude M. Godden, author of works on anthropology and folklore
- Jean Godden, member of the Seattle City Council
- Jimmy Godden (1879–1955), British actor
- Jon Godden (1906–1984), English novelist
- Luke Godden (born 1978), Australian footballer
- Malcolm Reginald Godden (born 1945), Rawlinson and Bosworth Professor of Anglo-Saxon
- Matt Godden (born 1991), English footballer
- Rumer Godden (1907–1998), English author
- Salena Godden, a British poet, performer and writer
- Thomas Godden, real surname Tylden (1624–1688), English courtier implicated in the Titus Oates plot
- Tony Godden (1955–2026), English football goalkeeper
- Tony Godden (Australian rules footballer) (born 1972), Australian footballer
- Ernest Godden (Ernie) (Born 1946) English Painter, North Bovey, Gallery.On.the.Green

== See also ==
- Godden Green, a hamlet in Kent, England
- The Loves of Joanna Godden, a 1947 British historical drama film
