= Bury (surname) =

Bury is an English, French, and Slavic, particularly Polish, surname. Notable people with the surname include:

- Aliaksandr Bury (born 1987), Belarusian tennis player
- Alison Bury (born 1954), British violinist and orchestra leader
- Bernard de Bury (1720–1785), French musician
- Richard de Bury (1287–1345), English priest, teacher, bishop, writer and bibliophile
- Robert of Bury (died 1181), English boy murder victim and Roman Catholic saint
- Ambrose Bury (1869–1961), Canadian politician
- Charles Bury, 1st Earl of Charleville (1764–1835), Irish politician
- Charles Bury, 2nd Earl of Charleville (1801–1851), Irish politician, son of the above
- Lady Charlotte Bury (1775–1861), English novelist
- Chris Bury (born 1953), American journalist
- Dominik Bury (born 1996), Polish cross-country skier
- Edward Bury (1794–1858), British locomotive manufacturer
- Edward Bury (minister) (1616–1700), English ejected minister
- Edward Bury (MP) for Maldon (UK Parliament constituency) in 1542
- Frank Bury (1910–1944), British composer
- Frederick Bury (1836–1885), English cricketer
- George Wyman Bury (1874–1920), British army officer, explorer and naturalist
- Jan Bury (born 1963), Polish politician
- Jan Stanisław Bury (born 1977), Polish political scientist
- John Bury (disambiguation)
- Józef Bury (born 1961), Polish artist
- Judson Sykes Bury (1852–1944), British physician
- Kamil Bury (born 1995), Polish cross-country skier
- Les Bury (1913–1986), Australian politician
- Maxwell Bury (1825–1912), English-born New Zealand architect
- Oliver Robert Hawke Bury (1861–1946), English railway engineer, chief mechanical engineer on the Great Western Railway of Brazil, General Manager of the Great Northern Railway in England and Director of the London and North Eastern Railway
- Pol Bury (1922–2005), Belgian sculptor
- Priscilla Susan Bury (1799–1872), British botanist and illustrator
- Thomas Bury (judge) (1655–1722), English judge and Chief Baron of the Exchequer
- Thomas Talbot Bury (1809–1877), British architect and lithographer
- William Bury (disambiguation)
