= Gresley =

Gresley or LeGresley is a surname and may refer to:

- Edgar LeGresley (1940–2007), Canadian politician
- Francis Le Gresley, Jersey politician
- Frank Gresley (1855–1936), British painter
- Sir George Gresley, 1st Baronet (c.1580–1651), English landowner and politician
- Harold Gresley (1892–1967), son of Frank, also a British painter
- Henri Gresley (1819–1890), French Minister of War
- James Stephen Gresley (1829–1908), father of Frank, also a British painter
- Karen LeGresley (born 1951), Canadian freestyle swimmer
- Nigel Gresley (1876–1941), English locomotive engineer
- Sir Nigel Gresley, 6th Baronet (c.1727–1787), English land-owner, mine-owner and builder
- Roger Gresley, (1799–1837), English writer and Tory politician
- Sir Thomas Gresley, 5th Baronet (1722–1753), Member of Parliament for Lichfield 1753
- Sir Thomas Gresley, 10th Baronet (1832–1868), Member of Parliament for South Derbyshire
- William Gresley (divine) (1801–1876), English cleric

== See also ==
- Castle Gresley, Derbyshire
- Church Gresley, village and former civil parish in the South Derbyshire district of Derbyshire, England
- LNER Class A4 4498 Sir Nigel Gresley, steam locomotive built 1937
