= Arkwright =

Arkwright is a surname, deriving from an archaic Old English term for a person who manufactures chests, and may refer to:

== People ==
- Augustus Arkwright (1821–1887), Royal Navy officer and MP for North Derbyshire
- Chris Arkwright (born 1959), English professional rugby league footballer
- Francis Arkwright (politician) (1846–1915), MP for East Derbyshire 1874–1880 and Member of the New Zealand Legislative Council
- Francis Arkwright (cricketer) (1905–1942), English cricketer
- George Arkwright (1807–1856), English politician
- Godfrey Edward Pellew Arkwright (1864–1944), British musicologist
- Harold Arkwright (1872–1942), English cricketer
- Henry Arkwright (cricketer, born 1811) (1811–1889), English amateur cricketer
- Henry Arkwright (1837–1866), English amateur cricketer
- Ian Arkwright (born 1959), English professional footballer
- John Stanhope Arkwright (1872–1954), British politician
- John Arkwright (rugby league) (1902–1990), British rugby league footballer
- Joseph Arthur Arkwright (1864–1944), British bacteriologist
- Marian Arkwright (1863–1922), English composer
- May Arkwright (1860–1915), suffrage leader in the early history of the Pacific Northwest of the United States
- Paul Arkwright (born 1962), British ambassador
- Sir Richard Arkwright (1732–1792), Englishman credited with inventing the spinning frame
  - Richard Arkwright junior (1755–1843), his son, who further developed his father's inventions
    - Richard Arkwright (1781–1832), grandson of the inventor, MP for Rye 1813–18 and 1826–30
- Richard Arkwright (barrister) (1835–1918), barrister and Conservative politician, MP for Leominster 1866–76. Great-grandson of the inventor Sir Richard.
- Robert Arkwright (1903–1971), British Army general

== In fiction ==
- Arkwright (Open All Hours) fictional character from the British television sitcom Open All Hours
- Arkwright, a 2016 novel by Allen Steele
- Luther Arkwright, the protagonist of Bryan Talbot's comic book series, The Adventures of Luther Arkwright
- Commander Arkwright of the Space Academy, in Tom Corbett, Space Cadet

== Places ==
- Arkwright Town, Derbyshire, England
- Arkwright, Alabama, United States
- Arkwright, Georgia, United States
- Arkwright, New York, United States
- Arkwright, South Carolina, United States

== See also ==
- Arkwright Scholarships in engineering, awarded in the UK
