= Helps =

Helps is a surname, and may refer to:

- Arthur Helps (1813–1875), English writer
- Charles Helps (1910–1991), English track cyclist
- Edmund Arthur Helps (1843–1938), English author and Arthur Helps' son
- Francis Helps (1890–1972), British artist
- Josh Helps (born 1994), Welsh rugby union player
- Lisa Helps (born 1976), Canadian politician
- Racey Helps (1913–1970), English children's author and illustrator
- Robert Helps (1928–2001), American pianist and composer
- Victoria Helps, Australian trade unionist and politician

== See also ==
- Helping behavior
