= Wheler =

Wheler is a surname, and may refer to:

- Humphrey Wheler (fl. 1600), English landowner and politician
- Sir William Wheler, 1st Baronet (c. 1601–1666), English politician
- Francis Wheler (1656–1694), Royal Navy officer
- George Wheler (mill owner) (1836–1908), Canadian mill owner and political figure
- George Wheler (travel writer) (1651–1724), English clergyman and travel writer
- Granville Wheler (1701–1770), English clergyman and natural philosopher

== See also ==
- Wheler baronets
- Wheeler (disambiguation)
