= Heberden =

Heberden is a surname. It may be:

- Charles Buller Heberden (1849–1921), Principal of Brasenose College, Oxford, and Vice-Chancellor of Oxford University
- Thomas Heberden (1703–1769), F.R.S. English physician
- Thomas Heberden (priest) (1754–1843), Canon of Exeter cathedral
- William Heberden (1710–1801), English physician
- William Heberden the Younger (1767–1845), English physician, and son of the William Heberden above.

== See also ==
- Heberden family tree
