= Baring-Gould =

Baring-Gould is a surname. Notable people with the surname include:

- Sabine Baring-Gould (1834–1924), English Anglican priest, hagiographer, antiquarian, novelist, folk song collector, and eclectic scholar
- William S. Baring-Gould (1913–67), Sherlock Holmes scholar and grandson of the former
