= Eales =

Eales is a surname. Notable people with the surname include:

- Darren Eales (born 1971), English football player
- Geoff Eales, Welsh jazz pianist
- Jacqueline Eales, British historian
- John Eales (born 1970), Australian rugby player
- Paul Eales (born 1963), English golfer

== See also ==
- Eales disease
- John Eales Medal
- Mrs. Mary Eales's Receipts
