= Shadwell (surname) =

Shadwell is an English surname.

Notable people with the name include:

- Thomas Shadwell (c. 1642–1692), English poet and playwright
- Lancelot Shadwell (1779–1850), British barrister and politician
- Charles Shadwell (Royal Navy officer) (1814–1886), Commander-in-Chief, China Station
- Charles Shadwell (priest) (1840–1910), jurisprudence lecturer at Oriel College, Oxford
- Francis Shadwell (1851–1915), English cricketer
- Arthur Shadwell (1854–1936), British physician and writer
- Lancelot Cayley Shadwell (1882–1963), English writer and lyricist
- Charles Shadwell (musician) (1898–1979), British conductor and bandleader
- Graham Shadwell (born 1968), English international bowls player
