= Wrinch =

Wrinch is a surname. Notable people with the surname include:

- Dorothy Maud Wrinch (1894–1976), English mathematician and biochemist
- Horace Cooper Wrinch (1866–1939), English-born Canadian physician and politician
- Mary E. Wrinch (1877–1969), British-Canadian artist
