= Alderson (surname) =

Alderson is a surname. Notable people with the surname include:

- Brian Alderson (footballer) (1950–1997), Scottish footballer
- Bryce Alderson (born 1994), Canadian soccer player
- Dale Alderson (1918–1982), American baseball pitcher
- Dan Alderson, American scientist and participant in science fiction fandom
- Edward Alderson (judge) (c. 1787–1857), an English lawyer and judge
- Edward Alderson (parliamentary clerk) (1864–1951), an English lawyer and public servant
- Edwin Alderson, British general during Boer Wars and World War I
- Frederic Alderson, English rugby union international captain
- Helen Popova Alderson, Russian and British mathematician
- Kristen Alderson, American actress appearing on daytime soap opera One Life To Live
- Mozelle Alderson (1904–1994), American classic female blues singer
- Samuel W. Alderson, inventor of the crash-test dummy
- Sandy Alderson, American baseball executive

== Fictional characters ==
- Elliot Alderson, lead character on the television series Mr. Robot, played by Rami Malek
