= Woodd =

Woodd is an English surname. Notable people with the surname include:

- Basil Woodd (1760–1831), English evangelical cleric and hymn-writer
- Basil Thomas Woodd (1815–1895), English politician.
- Henry Alexander Woodd (1865–1954), Australian Anglican priest
- Henry Woodd Nevinson (1856–1941), English war correspondent

== See also ==
- Wood (surname)
