= Perrott =

Perrott is a surname. Notable people with the surname include:

- Edward Perrott (1851–1915), English rugby union player
- Herbert Perrott (politician) (c. 1617–1683), English politician
- Sir Herbert Perrott, 5th Baronet (1849–1922), English baronet
- Nathan Perrott (born 1976), Canadian boxer and ice hockey player
- Rebecca Perrott (born 1961), New Zealand swimmer
- Thomas Perrott (1851–1919), British Army officer
