= Allix =

Allix is a surname, and may refer to:

- Augustine Allix (1823−1901), French singer, pianist and music teacher
- Dick Allix (1945–2024), English businessman
- Georges Baptiste François Allix (1808–1881), French naval engineer
- John Peter Allix (1785–1848), British politician
- Jules Allix (1818–1903), French feminist, socialist and political activist
- Paul Allix (1888–1960), French organist and composer
- Peter Allix (priest) (1679–1758), French-English Anglican dean
- Pierre Allix (1641–1717), Huguenot pastor and author
- Susan Allix (born 1943), British typesetter, bookbinder and artist
- Thérèse-Mirza Allix (1816–1882), French portrait painter and miniaturist
