= Gerhard Gepp =

Austrian artist (1940–2024)

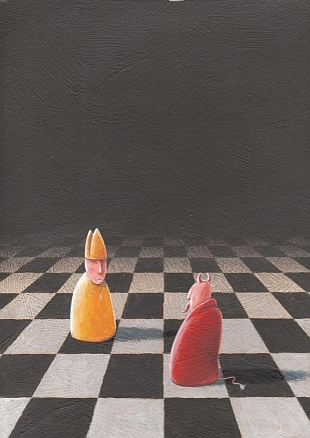
- "End game" by Gerhard Gepp
- Born: 20 April 1940; Pressbaum, Austria
- Died: 26 March 2024 (aged 83); Tulln an der Donau, Austria
- Known for: Illustrator, painter, graphic designer

Gerhard Gepp (20 April 1940 – 26 March 2024) was an Austrian illustrator, painter, and graphic designer.

== Biography ==
Gerhard Gepp was born on 20 April 1940 in Pressbaum on the western edge of Vienna, where he lived and worked until his death.

His initial training was in offset printing. As an artist, he was self-taught. Between 1964 and 1976, he worked as a graphic designer and illustrator.

Gepp received prizes for various pieces of work such as the "Poster Prize" from the City of Vienna and the Milanese "Rizzoli Prize". His first publications in various professional journals in Germany and Switzerland followed. At the same time Gepp worked at advertising photography and staged his own exhibition in the Vienna gallery "Die Brücke". In 1976 he also started to produce hand-coloured etchings. From 1976 he was working on drawings, gouache and oil paintings which were exhibited in Vienna at the BAWAG-Foundation. Further exhibitions in Austria and Germany followed and at art fairs in Basel, Cologne and Ghent.

From 1989, his illustrations focused increasingly on political satire. Working with acrylic on cardboard and/or canvas he continued to receive prizes at exhibitions. His illustrations frequently appeared in German-language and international publications.

In 2001 the Austrian "professional" Professor title was conferred on Gepp.

Gepp died in Tulln an der Donau on 26 March 2024, at the age of 83.

== Illustrations in newspapers and journals ==
Gerhard Gepp had numerous print media contracts. These have included daily papers such as Der Standard, Die Presse and the Wiener Zeitung in Austria as well as the Süddeutsche Zeitung and Die Zeit in Germany.

His magazine contracts included the Austrian economic monthly Trend, the German popular psychology monthly Psychologie Heute and Switzerland's satirical monthly Nebelspalter.

In addition, Gepp produced a large number of illustrations and title images for the Wiener Journal founded in 1980 by Jörg Mauthe (and sold in 2004 to the Wiener Zeitung).

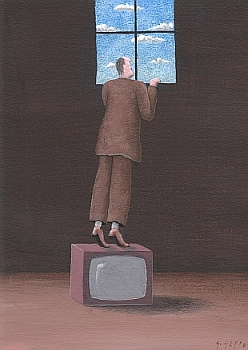
"Window" by Gerhard Gepp

Gerhard Gepp awards and prizes
- 1983 Staatspreis für Werbung, Girozentrale / IMT Wien
- 1990 Intern.Cartoonfestival Budapest/H, 3rd prize
- 1991 Satyrykon, Legnica/PL, Special prize
- 1992 IWA-Foundation, Havirov/CZ, 3rd prize; Velocartoon, Siauliai/LIT, 1st prize
- 1993 Satyrykon, Legnica/PL, 3rd prize
- 1994 Österr.Kinder-und Jugendbuch-Illustrationspreis 1994; Children/youth prize from the City of Vienna 1994
- 1996 Satyrykon, Legnica/PL, Special prize
- 1997 The Golden Smile, Belgrad/YU, 2.Preis; Satyrykon, Legnica/PL, 3rd prize
- 1998 12.Dutch Cartoonfestival, Eindhofen/NL, Spezialpreis; Satyrykon, Legnica/PL, 3rd prize
- 1999 2o.Biennale Intern.dell´Umorismo nell´Arte, Tolentino/I, Spezialpreis; Satyrykon, Legnica/PL, Special prize
- 2001 Intern. Forum of Visual Humour, Surgut/RUS, Special prize
- 2002 Satyrykon, Legnica/PL, 1st prize
- 2003 Eurohumor, Borgo San Dalmazzo/ I, Special prize, Satyrykon, Legnica / PL, 3rd prize
- 2004 Swiss Cartoon Award, CH, Spezialpreis; Humorest, Hradec Králové/CZ, 3rd prize
- 2006 "Alles Wein“, Literatur & Karikatur, Krems/A, 2.Preis; Satyrykon, Legnica/PL, Grand Prix
- 2008 Hans Langitz-Gedächtnispreis für Karikatur, Klagenfurt/A; Aydin Dogan XXV Intern.Cartoon Comp., Istanbul/TR, 3rd prize
- 2012 Karikaturmuseum Warschau, Intern. Competition "The ball is in play" 1st prize

== Books ==
- Werner Fiala, Gerhard Gepp: Manifest in Wort und Bild. Bibliothek der Provinz, 2010, ISBN 978-3-90000-072-1
- Irene Ulitzka, Gerhard Gepp: Das Land der Ecken. Picus Verlag, 1994, ISBN 3-85452-062-X, (Österr. Kinder- und Jugendbuchpreis 1994, Kinder- und Jugendbuchpreis der Stadt Wien, 1994)
- Gerhard Gepp: Kleines Boot auf Grosser Reise. Picus Verlag, 1995, ISBN 3-85452-087-5
