= Tolhurst =

Tolhurst is a surname, and may refer to:

- George Tolhurst (1827–1877), English composer a 19th-century English composer
- Jeremiah Tolhurst (1615–1671), English Civil War soldier, businessman and politician who sat in the House of Commons between 1654 and 1660
- John Tolhurst (born 1943), British Rear Admiral and a former Royal Navy officer
- Kelly Tolhurst (born 1978), English Conservative Party politician, Member of Parliament (MP) for Rochester and Strood since 2015
- Kerryn Tolhurst, Australian musician and songwriter
- Lol Tolhurst (born 1959), founding member of the UK rock band, The Cure
- Rhys Tolhurst, Australian singer-songwriter
- Stan Tolhurst, Australian actor
- William Tolhurst (1931–2013), New Zealand chartered accountant and member of parliament
