= Ledgard =

Ledgard is a surname. Notable people with the surname include:

- Jimmy Ledgard (1922–2007), English rugby player
- Kiko Ledgard (born 1918), Peruvian TV presenter and actor
- Samuel Ledgard (1874–1952), English entrepreneur
- Tony Ledgard (born 1971), Peruvian cyclist
- Walter Ledgard (1915–1999), Peruvian swimmer
- Walter Ledgard Jr. (born 1945), Peruvian swimmer

== See also ==
- Ledgard Bridge, crosses the River Calder in Mirfield, West Yorkshire, England
