= Vaillant (surname) =

Vaillant is a surname. Notable people with the surname include:

Artists of the Dutch Golden Age

- Andries Vaillant (1655–1693), engraver and painter
- Bernard Vaillant (1632–1698), painter
- Jacques Vaillant (1643–1691), painter
- Jan Vaillant (1627–1668), painter
- Wallerant Vaillant (1623–1667), painter

Politics

- Auguste Vaillant (1861–1894), French anarchist
- Cornelis Vaillant (1781–1849), Dutch judge and governor of Suriname
- Daniel Vaillant (born 1949), French socialist politician
- Édouard Vaillant (1840–1915), prominent French socialist

Science and medicine

- François Le Vaillant (1753–1824), French explorer and ornithologist
- George Clapp Vaillant (1901–1945), American anthropologist
- George Eman Vaillant (born 1934), American psychiatrist
- Léon Vaillant (1834–1914), French zoologist
- Louis Vaillant (1876–1963), French doctor, naturalist, explorer and soldier
- Sébastien Vaillant (1669–1722), French botanist

Other

- André Vaillant (1890–1977), French linguist and Slavist
- Auguste-Nicolas Vaillant (1793–1858), French naval officer
- François Vaillant de Gueslis (1646–1718), French Jesuit missionary
- George Clapp Vaillant (1901–1945), American anthropologist
- Greta Vaillant (1942–2000), French actress
- Jean Alexandre Vaillant (1804–1886), French and Romanian historian and schoolteacher
- Jean-Baptiste Philibert Vaillant (1790–1872), French soldier
- Jehan Vaillant (fl. 1360–1390), French composer
- Johann Vaillant (1851–1920) German coppersmith, founder of the Vaillant Group
- John Vaillant (born 1962), American writer and journalist
- Marguerite Vaillant (1855–1930), French opera singer
- Nigel Le Vaillant (born 1958), British actor
- Pierre Henri Vaillant (1878–1939), French painter
- Raymond Vaillant (1935–2006), French composer

Fictional characters:

- Michel Vaillant, a comic book character
