= Bob Bodington =

Australian rules footballer

Personal information
- Full name: Robert Noel Bodington
- Born: 22 December 1894; Carlton, Victoria
- Died: 30 October 1976 (aged 81); Brighton, Victoria
- Original team: Army / Hawthorn (MJFA)

Playing career^{1}
Years	Club	Games (Goals)
1919–20	Melbourne	5 (0)
- ^{1} Playing statistics correct to the end of 1920.

Robert Noel Bodington (22 December 1894 – 30 October 1976) was an Australian rules footballer who played with Melbourne in the Victorian Football League (VFL).

He later served in France in World War I.
