= Jodrell =

Surname

Jodrell is a surname. Notable people with the surname include:

- Alfred Jodrell (1847–1929), English collector
- Henry Jodrell (1750–1814), British politician, MP for Great Yarmouth and for Bramber, Sussex
- Neville Jodrell (1858–1932), British politician, MP for Mid Norfolk and for King's Lynn
- Paul Jodrell (1746–1803), English physician
- Richard Paul Jodrell (1745–1831), British classical scholar and playwright.
- Steve Jodrell, Australian stage director
- Thomas Jodrell Phillips Jodrell (1807–1889), barrister, land-owner and philanthropist

== See also ==
- Jodrell Bank Centre for Astrophysics, at the University of Manchester
- Jodrell Bank Observatory, radio observatory at the University of Manchester
- Jodrell baronets, in the Baronetage of Great Britain
- Jodrell Laboratory, at Kew Gardens
- Jodrell Hall, formerly a mansion, now used as a school in Cheshire, England
