= Floyer =

Floyer is a surname, and may refer to:

- Arthur Floyer-Acland (1885–1980), British Army officer
- Ceal Floyer (1968–2025), British visual artist
- Ernest Ayscoghe Floyer (1852–1903), British colonial official and explorer
- John Floyer (physician) (1649–1734), English physician and author
- John Floyer (Tamworth MP) (c.1681–1762), English politician, Member of Parliament for Tamworth 1741–42
- John Floyer (Dorset MP) (1811–1887), English Conservative politician, Member of Parliament for Dorset 1846–67 and 1864–95
- Stafford Floyer-Acland (1916–1994), British soldier

== See also ==
- Floyer Sydenham (1710–1787), English classical scholar
