= Pole-Carew =

Pole-Carew is a surname, and may refer to:

- Christopher Pole-Carew (1931–2020), British naval officer and newspaper executive
- Reginald Pole-Carew (British Army officer) (1849–1924), British soldier and Member of Parliament
- William Pole-Carew (1811–1888), British politician from Cornwall

== See also ==
- Reginald Pole Carew, British politician
