= Duddridge =

Duddridge is an English surname. Notable people with the surname include:

- James Duddridge (born 1971), British politician
- Paul Duddridge (born 1966), British writer, comedy agent, producer, and director
