= Danvers (surname) =

Danvers or D'Anvers (French: from Antwerp) is a surname. Notable people with the surname include:

- Alicia D'Anvers (1668–1725), British poet
- Charles Danvers (songwriter) (f. 1950s), French-born US songwriter
- Dennis Danvers (born 1947), US author
- Gérard Thibault d'Anvers (1574–1629), Dutch fencing master
- Henry Danvers, 1st Earl of Danby (1573–1644), British soldier
- Ivor Danvers (1932–2020), British actor
- John Danvers (1588–1655), British politician and courtier
- Tasha Danvers (born 1977), British track and field athlete
- William Danvers (1428–1504), British justice

== Fictional characters ==
- Mrs. Danvers, character in the novel Rebecca by Daphne du Maurier
- Alex Danvers, original character of the TV Show, Supergirl
- Caleb Danvers, fictional character in the 2006 film The Covenant
- Carol Danvers, Marvel comic book character, also known as Ms. Marvel, Captain Marvel, Binary, and Warbird
- Ed Danvers, fictional state prosecutor played by Željko Ivanek on the U.S. TV series Homicide: Life on the Street
- Kara Danvers, another version of Supergirl
- Linda Danvers, one version of Supergirl
- Clayton and Jeremy Danvers, characters in the TV series Bitten played by Greyston Holt and Greg Bryk, respectively

== See also ==
- Bob Danvers-Walker (1906–1990), British radio personality
