= Thursby (surname) =

Thursby is a surname, and may refer to:

- Cecil Thursby (1861–1936), British Royal Navy officer
- Dorothy Thursby-Pelham (1884–1972), British scientist
- Emma Cecilia Thursby (1845–1931), American singer
- Sir John Thursby, 1st Baronet (1826–1901), British landowner, army officer and sportsman
- Patrick Thursby (1922–1994), British Army officer
- Thomas Thursby (died 1510), English merchant
- Thomas Thursby (d. 1543) (1487–1543), English land owner in Norfolk, son of the merchant
