= Rivington (surname) =

Rivington is a surname, and may refer to:

- Charles Rivington (1688–1742), British publisher
- James Rivington (1724–1802), English-born American journalist
- Kanata Rivington, protagonist of MF Ghost
- Luke Rivington (1838–1899), English Roman Catholic priest and writer
