= Bicknell =

Bicknell is a surname. Notable people with the surname include:

- Bennet Bicknell (1781–1841), American politician
- Clarence Bicknell (1842–1918), British pastor, botanist and esperantist
- Darren Bicknell (born 1967), English cricketer
- Ed Bicknell (born 1948), English businessman
- Elhanan Bicknell (1788–1861), British businessman and shipowner
- Eugene Pintard Bicknell (1859–1925), American botanist and ornithologist
- Francis Bicknell Carpenter (1830–1900), American painter
- George A. Bicknell (1815–1891), American politician
- Greg Bicknell (born 1969), American baseball player
- Herman Bicknell (1830–1875), Brotish Orientalist and linguist
- Jack Bicknell (born 1938), American football coach
- John Bicknell Auden (1903–1931), English geologist
- John Dustin Bicknell (1838–1911), American lawyer
- Margaret Bicknell (c. 1695 – 1723), Scottish theatre actress and dancer
- Martin Bicknell (born 1969), English cricketer
- Russell Bicknell, New Zealand paleontologist
- Stephen Bicknell (1957–2007), English organ builder
- Steve Bicknell (born 1959), English footballer
- Thomas W. Bicknell (1834–1925), American author
