= Flavell =

Flavell may refer to:

- Bobby Flavell (1956–1995), English footballer
- Bobby Flavell (1921–2023), Scottish footballer
- Edwin Flavell (1898–1993), British Army officer
- Jack Flavell (1929–2004), English cricketer
- John H. Flavell (born 1928), American psychologist
- Kirsty Flavell (born 1967), New Zealand cricketer
- Miria Flavell, New Zealand entrepreneur
- Te Ururoa Flavell (born 1955), New Zealand politician
- Troy Flavell (born 1976), New Zealand rugby player
- Wendy Flavell (born 1961), British physics professor

== See also ==
- Flyford Flavell
