= Johnson (surname) =

English and Scottish surname

- Pronunciation: /ˈdʒɒnsən/
- Language: English, Scottish

Origin
- Language: Germanic
- Meaning: son of John
- Region of origin: England, Normandy

Johnson is a patronymic surname of Anglo-Norman origin. It is a patronym of the given name John and literally means "son of John". It is the second most common surname in the United States.
