= Woodthorpe (surname) =

Woodthorpe is a surname. Notable people with the surname include:

- Colin Woodthorpe (born 1969), English footballer
- Henry Woodthorpe Jr. (1780–1842), Town Clerk of London
- Henry Woodthorpe Sr. (1755–1825), Town Clerk of London
- Katherine Woodthorpe, Australian business executive
- Peter Woodthorpe (1931–2004), English actor
- Vincent Woodthorpe (c.1764–1822), English artist
- Walter Woodthorpe (1860–1943), South African cricketer
