= Crisp (surname) =

Crisp is a surname. Notable people with the surname include:

- Annie Crisp (1854–1953), English-born nurse
- Benjamin Crisp (1808–1901), New Zealand carrier, temperance reformer and character
- Bob Crisp (1911–1994), South African cricketer
- Charles Frederick Crisp (1845–1896), a US Representative from Georgia
- Charles R. Crisp (1870–1937), US politician
- Clement Crisp (1926–2022), a British dance critic
- Covelli Loyce "Coco" Crisp (born 1979), baseball center fielder
- Donald Crisp (1882–1974), English film actor
- Edwards Crisp (1806–1882), English surgeon and comparative anatomist
- Finlay Crisp (1917–1984), Australian academic and political scientist
- Fiona Crisp (born 1966), British photographer
- Frank Crisp (1843–1919), English lawyer and microscopist
- George Crisp (1911–1982), Welsh footballer
- Hank Crisp (1896–1970), American college sports coach
- Harold Crisp (1874–1942), Australian judge
- Henry Crisp (by 1505–75), English landowner and politician
- Hope Crisp (1884–1950), English tennis player, first winner of Wimbledon mixed doubles
- Jack Crisp (born 1993), Australian rules football player
- Jack Crisp (footballer) (1896–1939), English footballer
- James Crisp (born 1982), British Paralympic swimmer
- James Crisp (cricketer) (1927–2005), Welsh cricketer
- Joy Crisp, American planetary geologist specializing in Mars geology
- Mary Dent Crisp, American feminist and Republican Party official
- Michael Douglas Crisp (born 1950), Australian botanist
- N. J. Crisp (1923–2005), British television writer, dramatist and novelist
- Nathaniel Crisp (1762–1819), British prankster and baptizer
- Nicholas Crisp (c. 1599 – 1666), English Royalist and Member of Parliament
- Nigel Crisp, Baron Crisp (born 1952), British civil servant
- Norman Crisp (1923–2005), English television writer
- Quentin Crisp (1908–1999), English writer, artist's model, actor
- Quentin S. Crisp (born 1972), British SF writer.
- Ruth Crisp (1918–2007), crossword compiler
- Samuel Crisp (1707–1783), English dramatist
- Stephen Crisp (1628–1692), English Quaker activist and prolific writer
- Terry Crisp (born 1943), Canadian ice hockey centerman
- Thomas Crisp (1876–1917), English skipper, won VC
- Tobias Crisp (1600–1643), English clergyman and reputed antinomian
- William Crisp (1842–1910), English missionary priest who worked in South Africa

== See also ==
- Crisp (disambiguation)
