= History of the potato =

Domestication, spread, and popular usage of the potato in history

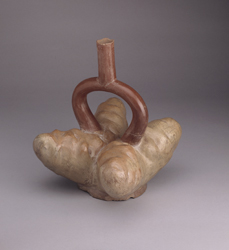
Potato ceramic from the Moche culture (Larco Museum Collection).

The potato was the first domesticated root vegetable in the region of modern-day southern Peru and extreme northwestern Bolivia between 8000 and 5000 BC. Cultivation of potatoes in South America may go back 10,000 years, but tubers do not preserve well in the archaeological record, making identification difficult. The earliest archaeologically verified potato tuber remains have been found at the coastal site of Ancón (central Peru), dating to 2500 BC. Aside from actual remains, the potato is also found in the Peruvian archaeological record as a design influence of ceramic pottery, often in the shape of vessels. The potato has since spread around the world and has become a staple crop in most countries.

== Early history: Western South America ==
=== Genetic origins ===
Potatoes and tomatoes are genetically related, as both belong to the Solanum genus. Scientists have long noted that modern potatoes closely resemble the subgroup Etuberosum, originating in western South America. Members of the Etuberosum lineage produce small underground stems that can sprout, but they do not swell to form tubers. This has led scientists to hypothesize a hybrid origin for the potato.

According to a 2025 Cell study examining Solanum genomes in small pieces, the potato (Petota) lineage may have arisen by a hybridization event between a member of the tomato lineage and a member of the Etuberosum lineage, with the two lineages diverging about 12 million years ago and the hybridization occurring about 8.6 million years ago. In this scenario, a gene from the tomato lineage would have enabled the development of larger tubers, allowing the newly formed lineage to carry out efficient asexual reproduction and become widespread in mountainous areas.

=== Archaeology ===
The Altiplano was home to the Chiripa culture, where early potato tubers were found at an archeological site.

The earliest archaeologically verified potato tuber remains were found at the coastal site of Ancón (central Peru), dating to 2500 BC. There is also recent evidence from stone tools suggesting that the cultivation of potatoes existed as far back as 3400 BC. However, it is difficult to be certain as potatoes do not preserve well compared to other crops. Potatoes dating to about 2000 BC were also found at Huaynuma, in the Casma Valley of Peru, and early potatoes dating to 800-500 BC were also uncovered at the Altiplano site of Chiripa on the east side of Lake Titicaca.

Archeological evidence also shows that throughout the formative period from 1500 BC to 500 BC and Tiwanaku period in the Andes, potatoes and tubers became increasingly popular as a crop and food. Boiled and steamed potatoes and tubers replaced soups throughout the formative period. From isotopic analysis of human skeletons and archeological reference materials, tubers and potatoes were an integral part of the Andean diet throughout the formative and Tiwanaku periods, alongside the grain quinoa and animals such as llamas. In the Incan period, potato and legume consumption decreased (although still commonly consumed) in favor of crops like maize.

A potato-shaped bottle of the Moche culture.

Aside from these remains, in the Peruvian archaeological record, the potato, among other crops, was uncovered as a design influence of ceramic pottery in the Altiplanos, often in the shape of vessels. These vessels represented potatoes in three ways: as clear depictions of the vegetable, as embodying a human form (either mutilated or not), or as a transition between the two. The fact that the Altiplanos chose to represent the potato in their vessels shows they had great social significance to the people there. Moreover, in Moche culture, potatoes did not have much religious or cultural significance compared to more prominent crops like maize. The protuberant and malformed nature of the potato fascinated the Moche and commonly appeared in their art as malformed animals and humans provoking an emotion known as mundo horroroso. The potato-symbolized art touched on themes such as physical deformities and hallucinations.

=== Uses in South American societies ===
In the Altiplano, potatoes provided the principal energy source for the Inca Empire, its predecessors, and its Spanish successor. Andean people prepared their potatoes in a variety of ways, such as boiled, mashed, baked, and stewed in ways similar to modern methods. The Andean people also prepared a dish called papas secas, which was a process that involved boiling, peeling, and chopping. These potatoes were then fermented in order to create tocosh, and ground to a pulp, soaked, and filtered into a starch referred to as almidón de papa. However, the cash crop of the Andean people was chuño, created by letting potatoes freeze overnight allowing them to thaw in the morning which they repeated to soften the potatoes. Then, farmers extracted the potatoes' water, leaving them much lighter and smaller. This new creation was later prepared into a stew (usually an addition). The primary benefit of chuño was that it could be stored for years without refrigeration, which came into use, especially during years of famine or bad harvests. Moreover, this long shelf life allowed it to be the staple food for the Inca armies due to how well it maintained its flavor and longevity. The Spanish fed chuño to the silver miners who produced vast wealth in the 16th century for the Spanish government.

Potato was the staple food of most Pre‑Columbian Mapuches, "specially in the southern and coastal Mapuche territories where maize did not reach maturity".

Potato was cultivated by the Chono tribe in Guaitecas Archipelago in Patagonia, being the southern limit of Pre-Hispanic agriculture as noted by the mention of the cultivation of Chiloé potatoes by a Spanish expedition in 1557.

== First European encounter ==
In 1537, a group of Spanish conquistadors became the first Europeans to encounter the potato. Don Juan Castellanos mentioned the plant in 1537 "as part of a military report on raiding an Inca village in Peru during a search for gold and silver to steal."

Mentions of the potato to European readers were made in Historia de las Indias in 1552 by Gonzalo Jiménez de Quesada, who wrote that in 1537, when he was in what is now the South American nation of Colombia, his party came across "una especie de trufas" ("a type of truffle") when entering homes of Chibcha people who had fled from the Bogotá region. Paraphrasing the Jimenez report, an author notes that members of the Jimenez expedition found the food in "the native village of Sorocota, about latitude 7 degrees north" not far from the Spanish settlement of Velez.

In 1553, in Cronica de Peru Pedro Cieza de León referred to the plant as a "battata". Cieza de Leon, a private soldier accompanying the Spaniards on an expedition in Popayán, found that potatoes and maize were the staple food. The potato later arrived in Europe sometime before the end of the 16th century by two different ports of entry: the first in Spain around 1570, and the second via the British Isles between 1588 and 1593. The first written mention of the potato is a receipt for delivery dated 28 November 1567 between Las Palmas de Gran Canaria and Antwerp. In France, at the end of the 16th century, the potato had been introduced to the Franche-Comté, the Vosges of Lorraine and Alsace. By the end of the 18th century, it was written in the 1785 edition of Bon Jardinier: "There is no vegetable about which so much has been written and so much enthusiasm has been shown ... The poor should be quite content with this foodstuff." It had widely replaced the turnip and rutabaga by the 19th century. Throughout Europe, the most important new food in the 19th century was the potato, which had three major advantages over other foods for the consumer: its lower rate of spoilage, its bulk (which easily satisfied hunger) and its cheapness. The crop slowly spread across Europe, becoming a major staple by mid-century.

== Spread across the world ==
=== Europe ===
Sailors returning from the Andes to Spain with silver presumably brought maize and potatoes for their own food on the trip. Historians speculate that leftover tubers (and maize) were carried ashore and planted: "We think that the potato arrived some years before the end of the 16th century, by two different ports of entry: the first, logically, in Spain around 1570, and the second via the British Isles between 1588 and 1593 ... we find traces of the transport of potatoes travelling from the Canaries to Antwerp in 1567 ... we can say that the potato was introduced there [the Canary islands] from South America around 1562 ... the first written mention of the potato [is] ... a receipt for delivery dated 28 November 1567 between Las Palmas in the Grand Canaries and Antwerp."

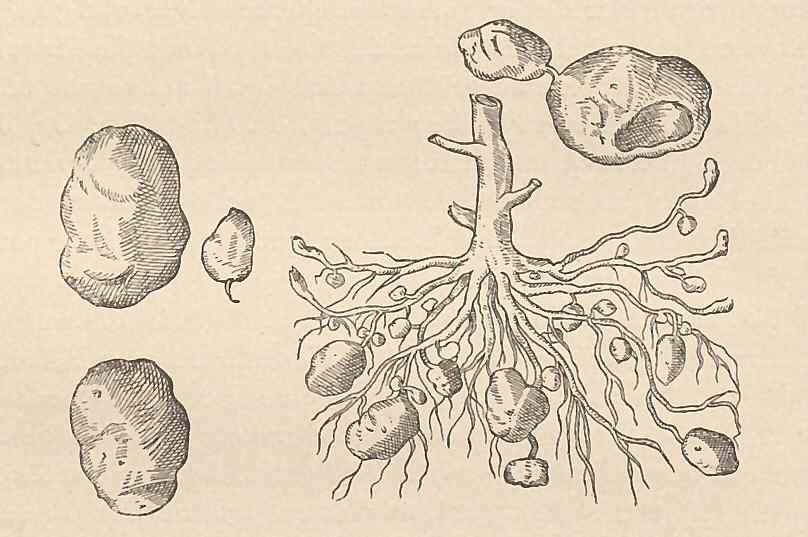
Carolus Clusius's botanical illustration of "Papas Peruanorum" (the potato of the Peruvians), Rariorum plantarum historia, 1601

Europeans in South America were aware of the potato by the mid-16th century but refused to eat the plant. For the Spaniards the potato was regarded as a food for the natives: the Spanish conquerors speak most favourably of the potato, but they recommend it especially for the natives who have to do the heaviest jobs. A similar pattern occurred in England where the potato became the food of the working class. In 1553, in the book Crónica del Peru, Pedro Cieza de León mentions he saw it in Quito, Popayán and Pasto in 1538. Basque fishermen from Spain used potatoes as ships' stores for their voyages across the Atlantic in the 16th century and introduced the tuber to western Ireland, where they landed to dry their cod. The English privateer Sir Francis Drake, returning from his circumnavigation, or Sir Walter Raleigh's employee Thomas Harriot, are commonly credited with introducing potatoes into England. In 1588, botanist Carolus Clusius made a painting of what he called "Papas Peruanorum" from a specimen in the Low Countries; in 1601 he reported that potatoes were in common use in northern Italy for animal fodder and for human consumption.

The potato first spread in Europe for non-food purposes. It was regarded with suspicion and fear due to it being a member of the nightshade family. Europeans assumed its resemblance to nightshade meant that it was the creation of witches or devils. At first it was mostly used as fodder for livestock or to feed the starving. In Northern Europe it was grown as an exotic novelty in botanical gardens.

The Spanish had an empire across Europe and brought potatoes for their armies. Peasants along the way adopted the crop, which was less often pillaged by marauding armies than above-ground stores of grain. Across most of Northern Europe, where open fields prevailed, potatoes were strictly confined to small garden plots because field agriculture was strictly governed by custom that prescribed seasonal rhythms for plowing, sowing, harvesting and grazing animals on fallow and stubble. This meant that potatoes were barred from large-scale cultivation because the rules allowed only grain to be planted in the open fields. People feared that it was poisonous like other plants the potato was often grown with in herb gardens, and distrusted a plant, nicknamed "the devil's apples", that grew underground. In France and Germany, government officials and noble landowners promoted the rapid conversion of fallow land into potato fields after 1750. The potato thus became an important staple crop in northern Europe. Famines in the early 1770s contributed to its acceptance, as did government policies in several European countries and climate change during the Little Ice Age, when traditional crops in this region did not produce as reliably as before. At times and places when and where most other crops failed, potatoes could still typically be relied upon to contribute adequately to food supplies during colder years.

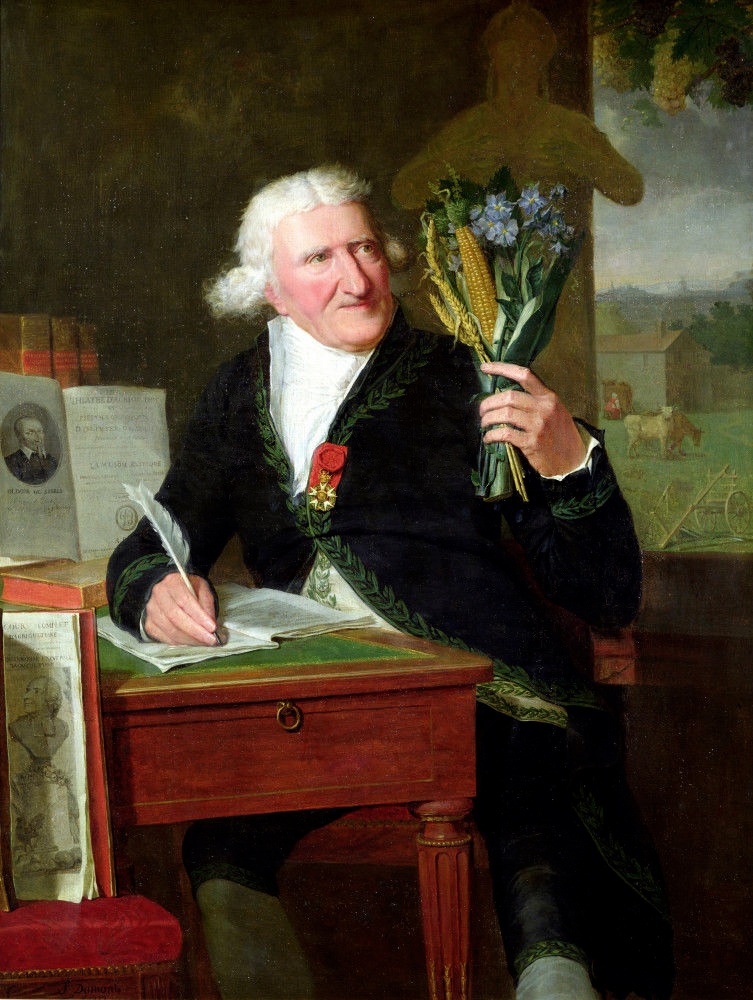
Antoine Parmentier holding New World plants. François Dumont, 1812

In France, at the end of the 16th century, the potato had been introduced to the Franche-Comté, the Vosges of Lorraine and Alsace. By the end of the 18th century, it was written in the 1785 edition of Bon Jardinier: "There is no vegetable about which so much has been written and so much enthusiasm has been shown ... The poor should be quite content with this foodstuff." The people also began to overcome their disgust of the potato when Louis XVI and Marie-Antoinette began wearing potato blossoms in their everyday attire. It had widely replaced the turnip and rutabaga by the 19th century.

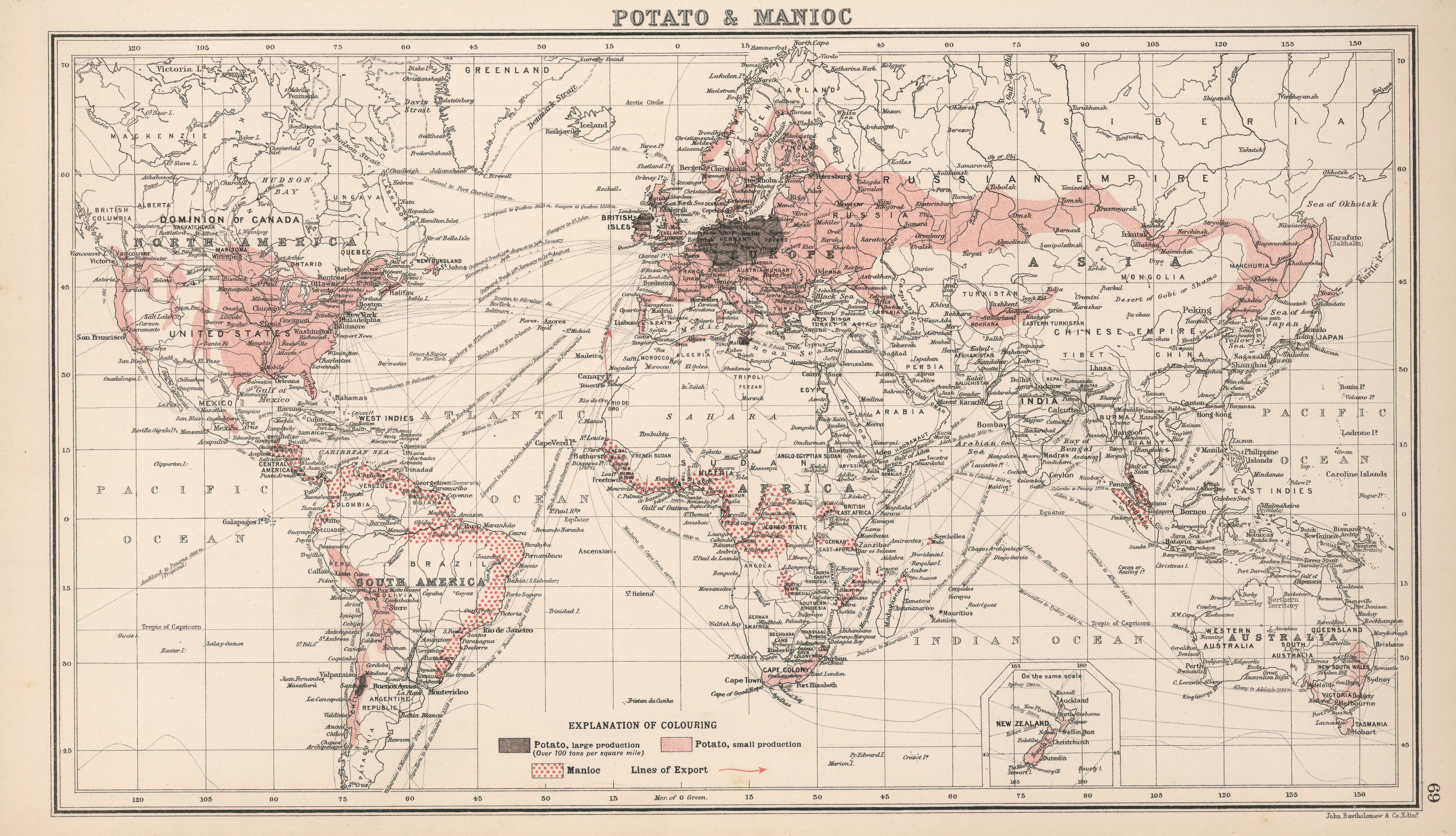
World map of potato and cassava cultivation, 1907

The potato had a large effect on European demographics and society, due to the fact that it yielded about three times the calories per acre of grain while also being more nutritive and growing in a wider variety of soils and climates, significantly improving agricultural production in the early modern era. Despite this it took a while to catch on. Probably the first area of Europe to cultivate it on a wide scale was Ireland in the early 17th century, so that by the 18th century the Irish population exploded, and its people subsisted almost entirely on the crop. It spread to England soon after it reached Ireland (being widely cultivated in Lancashire and around London, on top of imports from Ireland), also becoming a staple by the 18th century. By the late 18th century, Sir Frederick Eden wrote that the potato had become "a constant standing dish, at every meal, breakfast excepted, at the tables of the Rich, as well as the Poor." By 1715 the potato was widespread in the Low Countries, the Rhineland, Southwestern Germany, and Eastern France, and by the mid-18th century had also been firmly established in the Kingdom of Prussia in northern and eastern Germany, due to the efforts of Frederick II's government from 1744. Northern and western France took longer than eastern France, but there too it became common by the late 18th century. On the other hand, maize (which also yielded far more calories per acre than wheat) proved more popular than the potato in the hotter climates of Portugal, Spain, Italy, and southern France, first being grown in Spain around 1525 and becoming a common part of the peasant diet by the 17th century.

=== Africa ===
It is generally believed that potatoes entered Africa with colonists, who consumed them as a vegetable rather than as a staple starch. Shipping records from 1567 show that the first place outside of Central and South America where potatoes were grown were the Canary Islands. As in other continents, despite its advantages as an anti-famine, high-elevation alternative to grain, potatoes were first resisted by local farmers who believed they were poisonous. As colonialists promoted them as a low-cost food, they were also a symbol of domination. In former European colonies of Africa, potatoes were initially consumed only occasionally, but increased production made them a staple in certain areas. Potatoes tended to become more popular in wartime due to their being able to be stored in the ground. It was well established as a crop by the mid-20th century and in present-day Africa they have become a vegetable or co-staple crop.

In higher regions of Rwanda, potatoes have become a new staple food crop. Prior to the 1994 Rwandan genocide, consumption was as high as 153 to 200 kg per year – higher than in any Western European country. Recently farmers have developed the potato as a cash crop after introducing several new varieties brought back by migrant laborers from Uganda and other varieties from Kenya.

=== Asia ===
The potato diffused widely after 1600, becoming a major food resource in Europe and East Asia. Following its introduction into China toward the end of the Ming dynasty, the potato immediately became a delicacy of the imperial family. After the middle period of the Qianlong era (1735–1796) in the Qing dynasty, population increases and a subsequent need to increase grain yields coupled with greater peasant geographic mobility led to the rapid spread of potato cultivation throughout China, and it was acclimated to local natural conditions.

Peter Boomgaard looks at the adoption of various root and tuber crops in Indonesia throughout the colonial period and examines the chronology and reasons for progressive adoption of foreign crops: sweet potato (widespread by the 1670s), ("Irish") potato and bengkuang (yam beans) (both locally abundant by the 1780s), and cassava (from the 1860s).

In India, Edward Terry mentioned the potato in his travel accounts of the banquet at Ajmer by Asaph Khan to Sir Thomas Roe, the British Ambassador in 1675. The vegetables gardens of Surat and Karnataka had potatoes as mentioned in Fyer's travel record of 1675. British traders introduced potatoes to Bengal as a root crop, alu. By the end of the 18th century, it was cultivated across northern hill areas of India. Potatoes were introduced to Tibet by the 19th century through the trade route from India.

=== North America ===
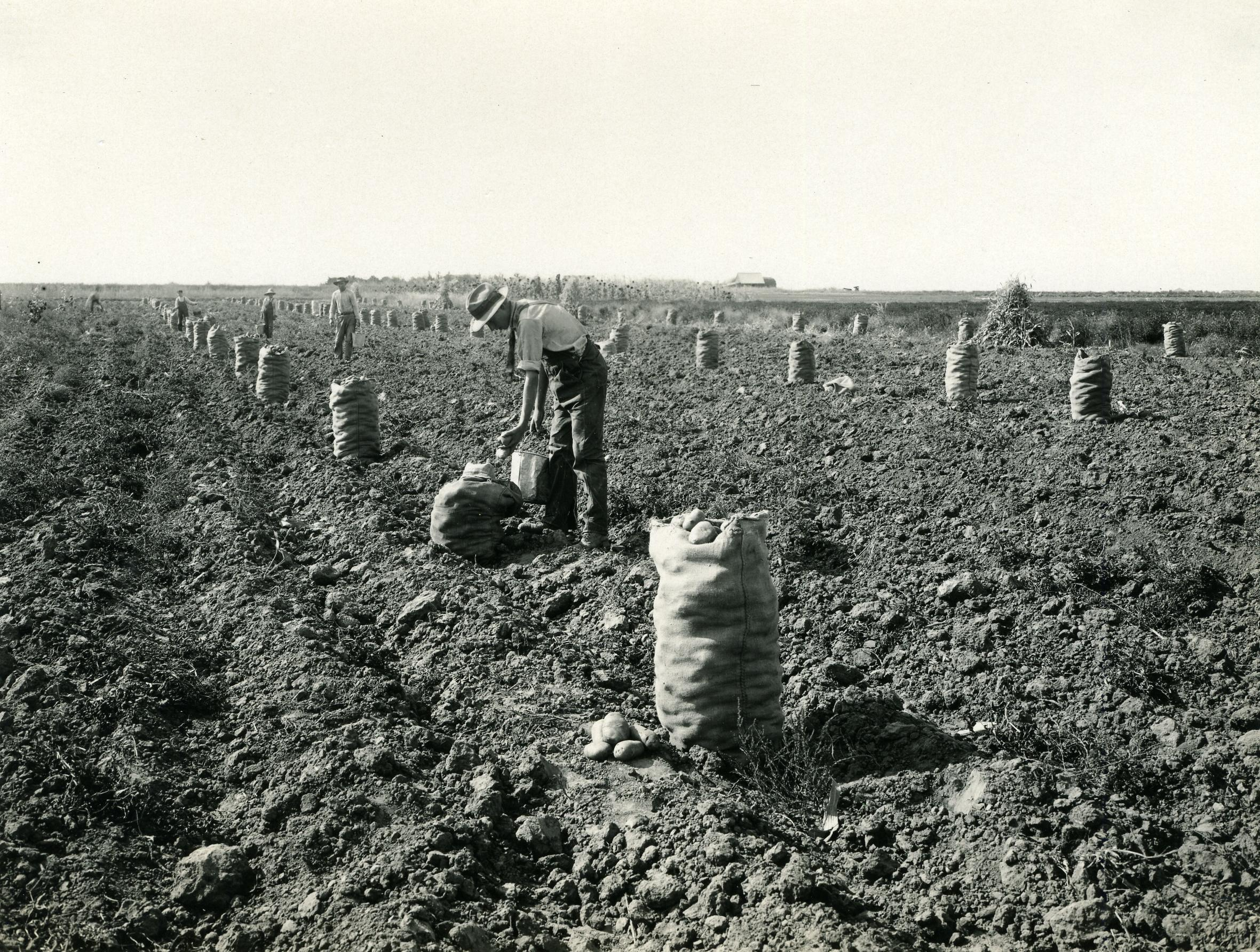
Potato harvest in Idaho, circa 1920

Early colonists in Virginia and the Carolinas may have grown potatoes from seeds or tubers from Spanish ships. Still, the earliest certain potato crop in North America was brought to New Hampshire in 1719 from Derry. The plants were from Ireland, so the crop became known as the "Irish potato". Thomas Jefferson said of the potato, "you say the potato is a native of the US. I presume you speak of the Irish potato. I have enquired much into this question, & think I can assure you that plant is not a native of N. America." It was not until after 1750 – as with Europe – that they were widely planted in eastern North America. In 1812 the Russian-American Company's Fort Ross planted a crop, the first in western North America and possibly a second, independent introduction into the continent. In a report written during the 1820 Cass Expedition, James Duane Doty wrote of crops grown around Leech Lake, Sandy Lake, and Fond du Lac, in what is now Minnesota, which the Ojibwe called waub-es-see-pin, indicating a type of potato. Potatoes were planted in Idaho as early as 1838; by 1900 the state's production exceeded a million bushels (about 27,000 tonnes). Before 1910, the crops were stored in barns or root cellars, but, by the 1920s, potato cellars or barns came into use. U.S. potato production has increased steadily; two-thirds of the crop comes from Idaho, Washington, Oregon, Colorado, and Maine, and potato growers have strengthened their position in both domestic and foreign markets.

== Becoming a European staple food ==
French physician Antoine Parmentier studied the potato intensely and in Examen chymique des pommes de terres ("Chemical examination of potatoes") (Paris, 1774) showed their enormous nutritional value. King Louis XVI and his court eagerly promoted the new crop, with Queen Marie Antoinette even wearing a headdress of potato flowers at a fancy dress ball. The annual potato crop of France soared to 21 million hectoliters in 1815 and 117 million in 1840, allowing a concomitant growth in population while avoiding the Malthusian trap.

Although potatoes had become widely familiar in Russia by 1800, they were confined to garden plots until the grain failure in 1838–39 persuaded peasants and landlords in central and northern Russia to devote their fallow fields to raising potatoes. Potatoes yielded from two to four times more calories per acre than grain did and eventually came to dominate the food supply in Eastern Europe. Boiled or baked potatoes were cheaper than rye bread, just as nutritious, and did not require a gristmill for grinding. On the other hand, cash-oriented landlords realized that grain was much easier to ship, store and sell, so both grain and potatoes coexisted.

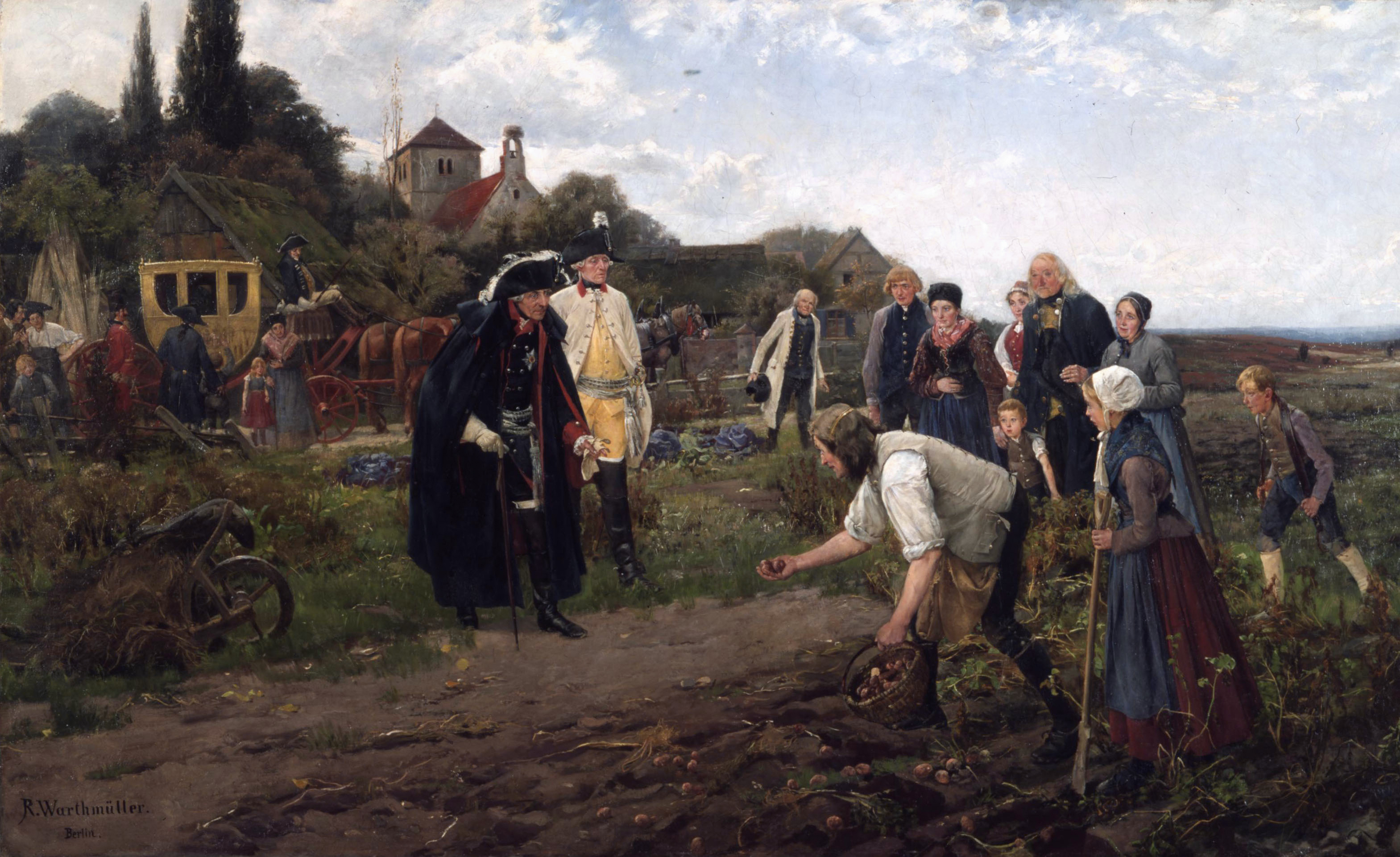
King Frederick the Great of Prussia, a potato proponent, inspects an early harvest. (Robert Warthmüller, 1886)

In the German lands, Frederick the Great, king of Prussia, strove successfully to overcome farmers' skepticism about the potato, and in 1756 he issued an official proclamation mandating its cultivation. This Potato Edict termed the unfamiliar tuber "a very nutritious food supplement." Frederick was sometimes known as the Kartoffelkönig ('potato king').

Throughout Europe, the most important new food in the 19th century was the potato, which had three major advantages over other foods for the consumer: its lower rate of spoilage, its bulk (which easily satisfied hunger), and its cheapness. The crop slowly spread across Europe, such that, for example, by 1845 it occupied one-third of Irish arable land. Potatoes comprised about 10% of the caloric intake of Europeans. Along with several other foods that either originated in the Americas or were successfully grown or harvested there, potatoes sustained European populations.

The potato promoted economic development in Britain by underpinning the Industrial Revolution in the 19th century. It served as a cheap source of calories and nutrients that was easy for urban workers to cultivate on small backyard plots. Potatoes became popular in the north of England, where coal was readily available, so a potato-driven population boom provided ample workers for the new factories. Marxist Friedrich Engels even declared that the potato was the equal of iron for its "historically revolutionary role". The Dutch potato-starch industry grew rapidly in the 19th century, especially under the leadership of entrepreneur Willem Albert Scholten (1819–92).

In Ireland, the expansion of potato cultivation was due entirely to landless laborers, renting tiny plots from landowners who were interested only in raising cattle or producing grain for the market. A single acre of potatoes and the milk of a single cow was enough to feed a whole Irish family a monotonous but nutritionally adequate diet for a healthy, vigorous (and desperately poor) rural population. Poor families often grew enough extra potatoes to feed a pig that they could sell for cash.

A lack of genetic diversity from the low number of varieties left the crop vulnerable to disease. In the early 1800s, a strain of potato blight (Phytophthora infestans) known as HERB-1 began to spread in the Americas, especially Central and North America, destroying many crops. The blight spread to Europe in the 1840s where, because of an extreme lack of genetic diversity, the potato crops were even more susceptible. In Northern Europe, there were major crop losses lasting throughout the rest of the 19th century. Ireland in particular was devastated by the blight's arrival in 1845 because Britain exported other foods, leaving Ireland only with the potato.

The Lumper potato, widely cultivated in western and southern Ireland before and during the Great Famine, was bland, wet, and poorly resistant to the potato blight, but yielded large crops and usually provided adequate calories for peasants and laborers. Heavy dependence on this potato led to disaster when the blight quickly turned harvest-ready and newly harvested potatoes into a putrid mush. The Irish Famine in the western and southern parts of Ireland between 1845 and 1849 was a catastrophic failure in the food supply that led to approximately a million deaths from famine and (especially) diseases that attacked weakened bodies, and to massive emigration to Britain, the U.S., Canada and elsewhere. During the famine years roughly one million Irish emigrated; this tide was not turned until the 20th century when Ireland's population stood at less than half of the pre-famine level of 8 million.

== 20th-century research ==
By the 1960s, the Canadian Potato Research Centre in Fredericton, New Brunswick, was one of the top six potato research institutes in the world. Established in 1912 as a Dominion Experimental Station, the station began in the 1930s to concentrate on breeding new varieties of disease-resistant potatoes. In the 1950s–1960s, the growth of the French fry industry in New Brunswick led to a focus on developing varieties for the industry. By the 1970s, the station's potato research was broader than ever before, but the station and its research programs had changed, as the emphasis was placed on the serving industry rather than potato farmers in general. Scientists at the station even began describing their work using engineering language rather than scientific prose. Potatoes are Canada's most important vegetable crop; they are grown commercially in all its provinces, led by Prince Edward Island.

Beginning in the 1960s Chilean agronomist Andrés Contreras begun to collect neglected local varieties of potatoes in Chiloé Archipelago and San Juan de la Costa. These varieties were mostly grown in small gardens by elderly women, and passed down generation by generation. In 1990 he led a potato-hunting expedition to Guaitecas Archipelago, the southern limit of Pre-Hispanic agriculture. The collection of Contreras became the groundwork for the gene bank of Chilean potatoes at the Austral University of Chile in Valdivia. Contreras reciprocated local communities by genetically improving varieties aimed for small scale agriculture.

In modern times potatoes have grown in popularity due to their versatility and ability to be used for many different dishes of food. Today the potato is the fifth most important crop worldwide, after wheat, corn, rice and sugar cane.

== See also ==
- History of food
- History of agriculture
- Potato cooking
- European Potato Failure
- Highland Potato Famine
