= Crisp =

Crisp may refer to:

== Foods ==
- Potato chips, known in British English as a potato crisp, a thin slice of a potato deep fried or baked until crispy
- Chip (snack), or crisp in British English
- Crisp (dessert), a type of American dessert, usually including fruit
- Crisp (chocolate bar), a Nestlé brand of wafer candy sold in the United States
- Simit, in Ottoman cuisine, a circular bread

== Places ==
=== United States ===
- Crisp, North Carolina, an unincorporated community
- Crisp, Texas, a ghost town
- Crisp, West Virginia, an unincorporated community
- Crisp County, Georgia

=== Antarctica ===
- Crisp Glacier, Victoria Land

== People ==
- Crisp (surname), a list of people
- Crisp Gascoyne (1700–1761), English businessman and Lord Mayor of London
- Crisp Molineux (1730-1792), English Member of Parliament
- Michael Crisp (1950-), Australian botanist whose standard author abbreviation is Crisp

== Other uses ==
- Crisp (horse), famous for the 1973 Grand National
- Crisp baronets, a title in the Baronetage of the United Kingdom
- C-language Reduced Instruction Set Processor, an AT&T microprocessor design
- Center for Research in Security and Privacy, a German IT security research centre
- Chesapeake Regional Information System for our Patients, an American health information exchange
- Computer Retrieval of Information on Scientific Projects, a database of the United States National Institutes of Health
- Construction Research and Innovation Strategy Panel, a British industry study group
- Coral Reef Initiative for the South Pacific, a French inter-ministerial project
- Cross-industry standard process for data mining (CRISP-DM), a data mining process model
- Cross Registry Information Service Protocol, an Internet standard
- Cysteine-rich secretory protein
- Computer Registration Involving Student Participation, a registration system designed by Bernard Galler

== See also ==
- Crisp Building, Sarasota, Florida, on the National Register of Historic Places
- Crisper (disambiguation)
- Crips
- CRISPR
