= Crisper =

Crisper or Crispers may refer to:

- Crisper drawer, or crisper, a compartment in a refrigerator
- Crispers (snack food), a snack food by Nabisco
- Crispers (restaurant), a fast-casual restaurant chain in Florida, U.S.

== See also ==
- Crisp (disambiguation)
- CRISPR, a family of DNA sequences
  - CRISPR gene editing
