= European potato failure =

1840s northern European food crisis

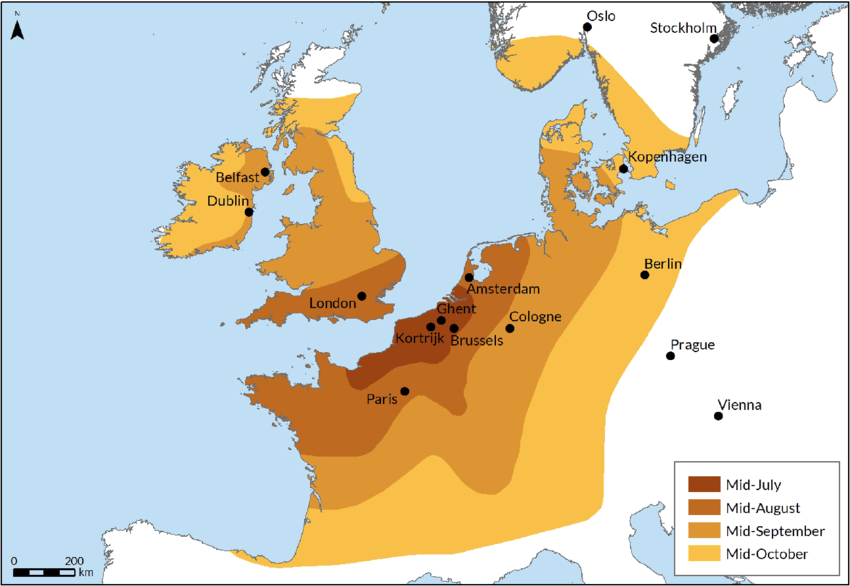
Spread of the potato blight in Europe in 1845

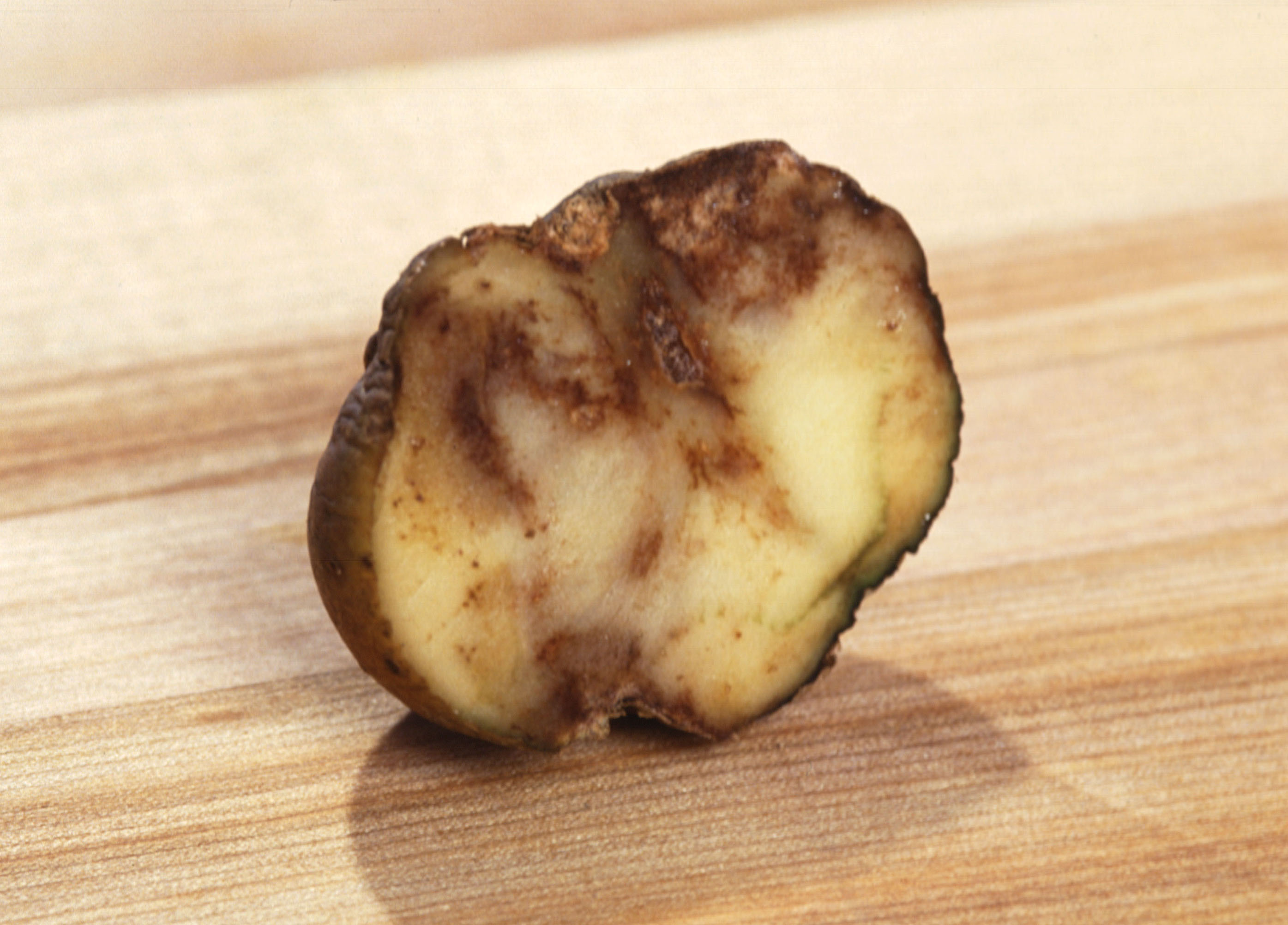
A blighted potato tuber

The European potato failure was a food crisis that struck Northern and Western Europe in the mid-1840s. The time is also known as the Hungry Forties. The widespread failure of potato crops, caused by potato blight, with the correspondent lack of other staple foods was the direct cause of the crisis. Excess mortality occurred across all affected areas, with the highest casualty rates occurring in the Scottish Highlands and Ireland via the Highland Potato Famine and Great Famine respectively. Mass emigration occurred as a result.

The death toll in Ireland is estimated at 1 million people, while the death toll through the remaining affected areas is estimated to be in the region of 100,000 people. Of this, Belgium and Prussia account for most of the deaths, with 40,000–50,000 estimated to have died in Belgium, with Flanders particularly affected, and about 42,000 estimated to have perished in Prussia. The remainder of deaths occurred mainly in France, where 10,000 people are estimated to have died as a result of famine-like conditions.

== Potatoes at the time ==
In 2013, researchers used DNA sequencing techniques to decode DNA from the pathogen in potato samples from 1845 stored in museums, and compare them to modern genetic types. The results indicated the "strain was different from all the modern strains analysed".

After the blight, strains originating in the Chiloé Archipelago replaced earlier potatoes of Peruvian origin in Europe.

	Potatoes				Rye	Wheat	Oats
	arable land	consumption	1845 yield	1846 yield			
	(%)	(kg/capita daily)	(% change on normal)				
Belgium	14%	0.5/0.6 kg	−87%	−43%	−50%	−10%	n/a
Denmark	3%	0.2/0.3 kg	−50%	−50%	−20%	−20%	n/a
Sweden	5%	0.5/0.6 kg	−20–25%	−20–25%	−10%	−10%	n/a
France	App. 6%	0.5 kg	−20%	−19%	−20%	−25%	n/a
Württemberg	3–8%	n/a	−55%	−51%	−15%	−24%	n/a
Prussia	11%	1.0/1.1 kg	n/a	−47%	−43%	−43%	n/a
Netherlands	11%	0.7 kg	−71%	−56%	−47%	−6%	n/a
Spain	2%	low	n/a	n/a	n/a	n/a	n/a
Highlands of Scotland	n/a	high	n/a	−80%	n/a	n/a	n/a
Ireland	32%	2.1 kg	−30%	−88%	n/a	n/a	−33%
Source: Cormac Ó Gráda et al., 2006

== Population decline ==
The effect of the crisis on Ireland is incomparable to all other places, causing one million deaths, up to two million refugees, and spurring a century-long population decline. Excluding Ireland, the death toll from the crisis is estimated to be in the region of 100,000 people. Of this, Belgium and Prussia account for most of the deaths, with 40,000–50,000 estimated to have died in Belgium, with Flanders particularly affected, and about 42,000 estimated to have perished in Prussia. The remainder of deaths occurred mainly in France, where 10,000 people are estimated to have died as a result of famine-like conditions.

Aside from death from starvation and famine diseases, suffering came in other forms. While the demographic impact of famines is immediately visible in mortality, longer-term declines of fertility and natality can also dramatically affect population. In Ireland births fell by a third, resulting in about 0.5 million "lost lives". Declines elsewhere were lower: Flanders lost 20–30%, the Netherlands about 10–20%, and Prussia about 12%.

Emigration to escape the famine centred mainly on Ireland and the Scottish Highlands. Elsewhere in the United Kingdom and on the continent, conditions were not so harsh as to completely eradicate the basics of survival so as to require mass migration of the sort experienced in Ireland and Scotland. Over 16,500 emigrated from the Scottish Highlands (out of a population affected by famine of no more than 200,000), many assisted by landlords and the Highland and Island Emigration Society, mainly to North America and Australia, this forming part of the second phase of the Highland Clearances. The global consequence of this was the creation of a substantial Irish diaspora.

	Annual population change						
	1840–45	1845–46	1846–47	1847–48	1848–49	1849–50	1850–60
Belgium	+1.1%	+0.9%	+0.9%	+0.0%	+0.5%	+0.2%	+0.7%
Denmark	+1.1%	+1.0%	+0.8%	+1.0%	+1.0%	+1.0%	+1.2%
Sweden	+1.1%	+0.8%	+0.6%	+1.0%	+1.3%	+1.2%	+1.0%
France	+0.5%	+0.7%	+0.4%	+0.1%	+0.3%	+0.0%	+0.5%
Germany (total)	+1.0%	+1.0%	+0.5%	+0.2%	+0.1%	+0.9%	+0.7%
Prussia	+1.3%	+1.4%	+0.8%	+0.5%	+0.4%	+0.9%	+1.0%
Netherlands	+1.1%	+1.1%	+0.3%	−0.2%	+0.1%	+0.3%	+0.7%
United Kingdom*	+1.2%	+1.2%	+0.7%	+0.7%	+0.7%	+0.7%	+1.3%
Ireland	+0.4%	−0.2%	−4%	−4%	−4%	−4%	−1.7%
Notes: *excluding Ireland
Source: Cormac Ó Gráda et al., 2006

== See also ==
- History of the potato
- History of agriculture
- History of food
