= Edwards Crisp =

English surgeon and comparative anatomist

Edwards Crisp (10 December 1806 – 15 November 1882) was an English physician and comparative anatomist. He was extremely critical of the Royal College of Surgeons and the government medical bodies of his time where he found corruption, nepotism, and other unfair practices. He published many polemical notes on the topic in addition to his studies on medical topics as well as in comparative anatomy.

== Life and work ==
Crisp was born in Rendlesham, Suffolk, in a family of landed farmers. He went to school in Ipswich and apprenticed to a physician at Long Melford in 1823. He then trained at St. Thomas's and Guy's Hospital and became a licentiate of the Society of Apothecaries in 1828 and in 1829 he became a member of the Royal College of Surgeons. He also spent time in Paris for two years studying methods used there. He started a practice in Brixton and later at Walworth Road and published notes in the Lancet. In 1844 he received the Jacksonian Prize of the Royal College of Surgeons for his work on the structure and disorders of the blood vessels. He received an MD from St. Andrews in 1848. He was rejected for the license of the Royal College of Physicians for the stated objection that he did not have enough experience. Having had twenty years of practice, he published a note on the mistreatment in a pamphlet "The examination of a rejected candidate at the Royal College of Physicians" (1848) and another one in 1849 noting that the examiners had not been fair in their dealings. He remained a bitter critic of the medical hierarchy and examination system. In 1849 he became a physician at the Metropolitan Dispensary. In 1851 he founded a journal called "The London Medical Examiner" which continued for another year and in which he published notes on the problems in the system and proposed improvements to reduce the corruption and make it more just. In 1851 he received a second Jacksonian Prize for his work on the treatment of intestinal obstruction. He continued to criticize the misuse of power by various medical authorities in their appointments and selections. Crisp had resumed his practice on Beaufort Street Chelsea and needed to support a growing family after marrying in 1846. He began to publish intensively on pathology and was also involved in studies in comparative anatomy, examining animals that died at the Zoological Society of London. These included studies on camels, pythons, and hummingbirds. He died while visiting a patient.
