= Joy Crisp =

American planetary geologist

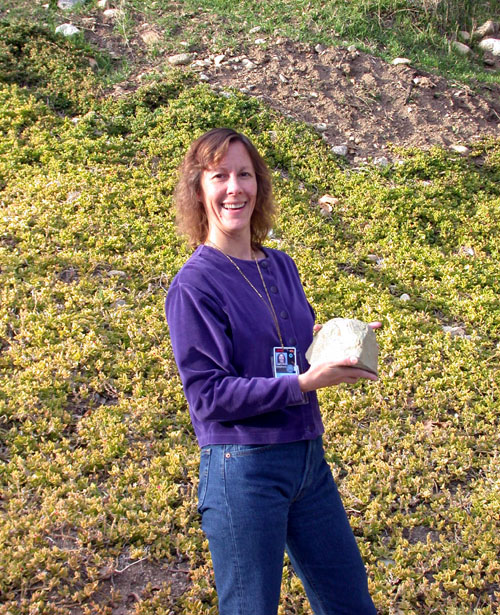
- Born: Colorado Springs, Colorado
- Education: Carleton College; Princeton University
- Scientific career
- Fields: Planetary science
- Workplaces: Jet Propulsion Laboratory

Joy A. Crisp is a planetary geologist specializing in Mars geology. She is noted for her work on NASA missions to Mars, including the Mars Exploration Rovers and Mars Science Laboratory.

== Early life and education ==
Crisp was born in Colorado Springs, CO. She earned a bachelor's degree in geology from Carleton College in 1979, and both a Master's (1981) and a PhD (1984) from Princeton University. Subsequently, Crisp was a postdoctoral researcher at UCLA for more than two years. Her studies involved investigating rocks from the Canary Islands under conditions similar to those within volcanoes.

== Career ==
Crisp has been a researcher at the Jet Propulsion Laboratory since 1989, initially joining to study Earth's volcanoes from above. She has been a principal scientist there since 2004. Crisp has worked on numerous projects and NASA missions, including the Mars Pathfinder, Mars Exploration Rovers, and Mars Science Laboratory (MSL). She became involved with studies of Mars through analyzing images from the Viking (spacecraft). She is the deputy project scientist for the MSL Curiosity rover mission. For her work on Curiosity, Crisp received the NASA Exceptional Service Medal in 2004, the NASA Exceptional Achievement Medal in 2013, and the NASA Outstanding Public Leadership Medal in 2020.
