= Fiona Crisp =

English photographer and installation artist

- Born: Fiona Crisp; 1966 (age 59–60); Derbyshire, England
- Education: MA, Slade School of Fine Art; BA, West Surrey College of Art and Design
- Known for: Photography and art installations

Fiona Crisp (born 1966 in Derbyshire) is an English photographer and installation artist. She is also Professor of Fine Art at Northumbria University.

== Career ==
Her solo exhibition, Subterrania, created over a six-year period, was shown at several UK locations in 2009. It consisted of large scale photographs of underground scenes, including a World War II hospital beneath Guernsey, catacombs under Rome and Geevor Tin Mine, Cornwall. The works were intended to comment on the relationships between heritage, tourism, history and science. According to The Guardian reviewer "Crisp's command of photographic atmosphere tends to suggest interiors of the mind as much as of architectural appearance." A monograph, Hyper Passive, was published to coincide with the tour and surveyed Crisp's work from the preceding decade. The monograph includes an essay by Professor Christopher Townsend of London University and an interview with Alessandro Vincentelli, Curator of Exhibitions and Research at BALTIC.

Crisp's current research centres on the idea of Negative Capability – a phrase first used by the poet John Keats to describe a desirable state of uncertainty and doubt. Keats’ idea is used by Crisp to pursue the photographic object as an unstable and deeply equivocal phenomenon as evidenced in her recent installation, Negative Capability: The Stourhead Cycle for Matt's Gallery, London. This exhibition also reflected Crisp's long-term engagement with the visual, political and philosophical ‘construction’ of a view – a position acknowledged by her inclusion in the 2013 exhibition, Looking at the View, at Tate Britain.

Her 2007 digital print, Norwegian series #3 is in the collection of the Tate Gallery.
