= James Crisp (cricketer) =

Welsh cricketer

Personal information
- Full name: James George Crisp
- Born: 15 November 1927; Newtown, Montgomeryshire, Wales
- Died: 4 December 2005 (aged 78); Butleigh, Somerset, England
- Batting: Right-handed
- Bowling: Right-arm fast-medium

Domestic team information
- Years: Team
- 1951: Oxford University
- 1957–1958: Suffolk

Career statistics
Competition	First-class
Matches	1
Runs scored	12
Batting average	12.00
100s/50s	–/–
Top score	12
Balls bowled	60
Wickets	0
Bowling average	–
5 wickets in innings	–
10 wickets in match	–
Best bowling	–
Catches/stumpings	–/–
- Source: Cricinfo, 12 July 2019

James George Crisp (15 November 1927 – 4 December 2005) was a Welsh first-class cricketer.

Crisp was born at Newtown in November 1927. While studying at Worcester College at the University of Oxford, he made a single appearance in first-class cricket for Oxford University against Leicestershire at Oxford in 1951. Batting twice in the match, he ended the Oxford first-innings unbeaten without scoring, while in their second-innings he was dismissed for 12 runs by Vic Jackson. He also bowled ten wicketless overs in the Oxford first-innings, conceding 26 runs. He also played football for Oxford University A.F.C., gaining a blue. In addition to playing first-class cricket, Crisp also played minor counties cricket for Suffolk in 1957 and 1958, making three appearances in the Minor Counties Championship. He died in December 2005 at Butleigh, Somerset.
