= Potato Edict =

Series of Prussian laws

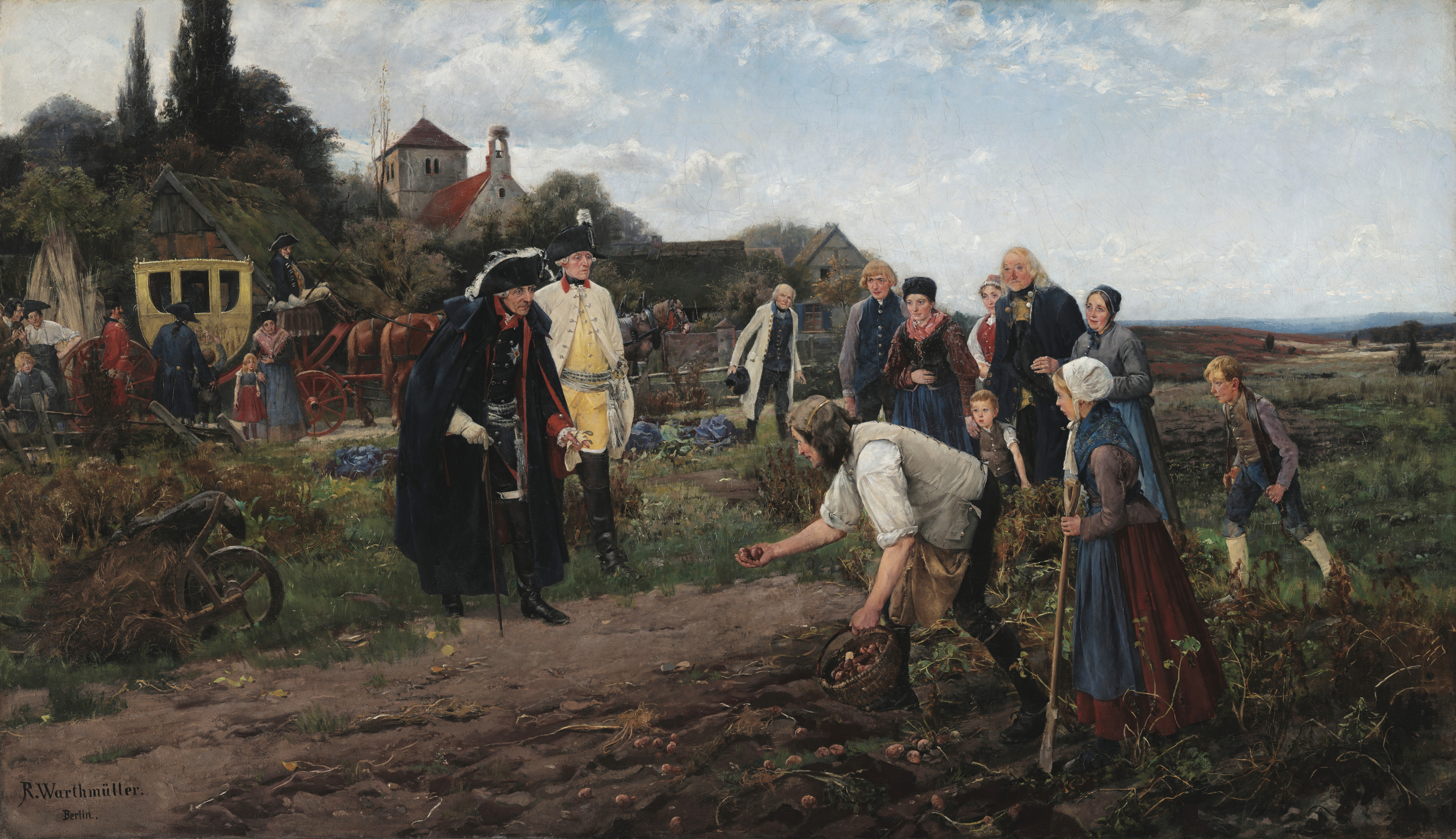
Frederick the Great inspecting the potato harvest ("The King Everywhere" by Robert Warthmüller)

The term Potato Edict, also known as Potato Order (German: Kartoffelbefehl), describes a series of directives and regulations issued by King Frederick the Great of Prussia through which he sought to promote the cultivation of potatoes throughout rural Prussia.

There are 15 such decrees on record, with the most prominent being issued on March 24, 1756, to remedy the effects of the Pomeranian famine. From a historical perspective, these edicts are now regarded as having had a particularly formative influence on both German cuisine and Frederick the Great's personal image, although myths and misconceptions have since obscured their true effectiveness.

== History ==
Frederick the Great's potato decrees may be viewed as reflecting a wider eighteenth-century effort to strengthen the state via population economics, of which food security constitutes a vital part. General concerns of the enlightened political elite regarding population management for military, agricultural improvement for economic, and public welfare for spiritual reasons gained particular urgency in the Kingdom of Prussia following a series of famines in the early 18th century. Potatoes as a potential source of nutrition were specifically valued because they promised a cheap and relatively reliable food source for the laboring population. Previously, the Prussian army depended heavily on bread, which required enormous quantities of flour during campaigns. During the Seven Years’ War, French disruption of grain imports increased the need to reduce dependence on wheat and rye. The potato thus offered a practical supplement because it produced far more food per acre than grain and could help feed the civilian population while preserving more cereals for military bread supplies.

However, accounts describing a supposedly reluctant peasantry needing enlightened rulers and agronomists to accept the benefits of potato cultivation (see paternalistic conservatism) have since grown to be viewed as unviable. Rather, these have been argued to constitute part of a broader eighteenth-century narrative based on top-down accounts while ignoring of the fact that potatoes had already been cultivated and eaten by ordinary people in several parts of Europe before elite promotion campaigns became prominent.

== Contents ==
The first potato-related decree, issued on 9 April 1746 in response to famine conditions in Pomerania, instructed citizens and farmers with sufficient land and resources to intensify the cultivation of garden crops, especially potatoes, in order to alleviate the shortage of bread. Before the decree was formally published by the Pomeranian War and Domains Chamber, seed potatoes had already been distributed to those in need, though the measure was said to have met with limited success, as many recipients were unfamiliar with the crop and rejected it. These issues later led Frederick to make subsequent potato decrees more detailed, including instructions for its cultivation and use (such as now-widespread recipes) and explanations of the crop's practical benefits.

Wann auch viele kleine Leute keine Aeker in denen Feldern haben, und denen gleichwohl diese Frucht hauptsächlich zu ihrem Unterhalte zu Nutze kommt; so müssen diese angewiesen werden, bey ihren Häusern und in ihren Gärten, wo nur ein leerer Platz zu finden, diese so nützliche Tartoffeln anzubauen.

[Although many humble people have no fields of their own, yet nevertheless derive their chief subsistence from this fruit, they are to be directed to cultivate these so useful potatoes by their houses and in their gardens, wherever any vacant place may be found.]

— Frederick the Great, Extract from No. CXLVIII. d.d Breslau den 5. April 1757. Circulare an sämtliche Land- und Steuer-Räthe, Magisträte und Beamte Bresl. Departements, wegen Anbauung der Tartoffeln

Following the circular of 24 March 1756, addressed to district administrators and officials in Silesia, compliance with the order to plant potatoes on as much viable farmland as possible was surveilled by civil servants and pastors, the latter of which would become known as tuber pastors (German: Knollenpastor, comparable to the Norwegian potato priests) and had the additional task of disseminating any new insights on the topic.

== Legacy ==
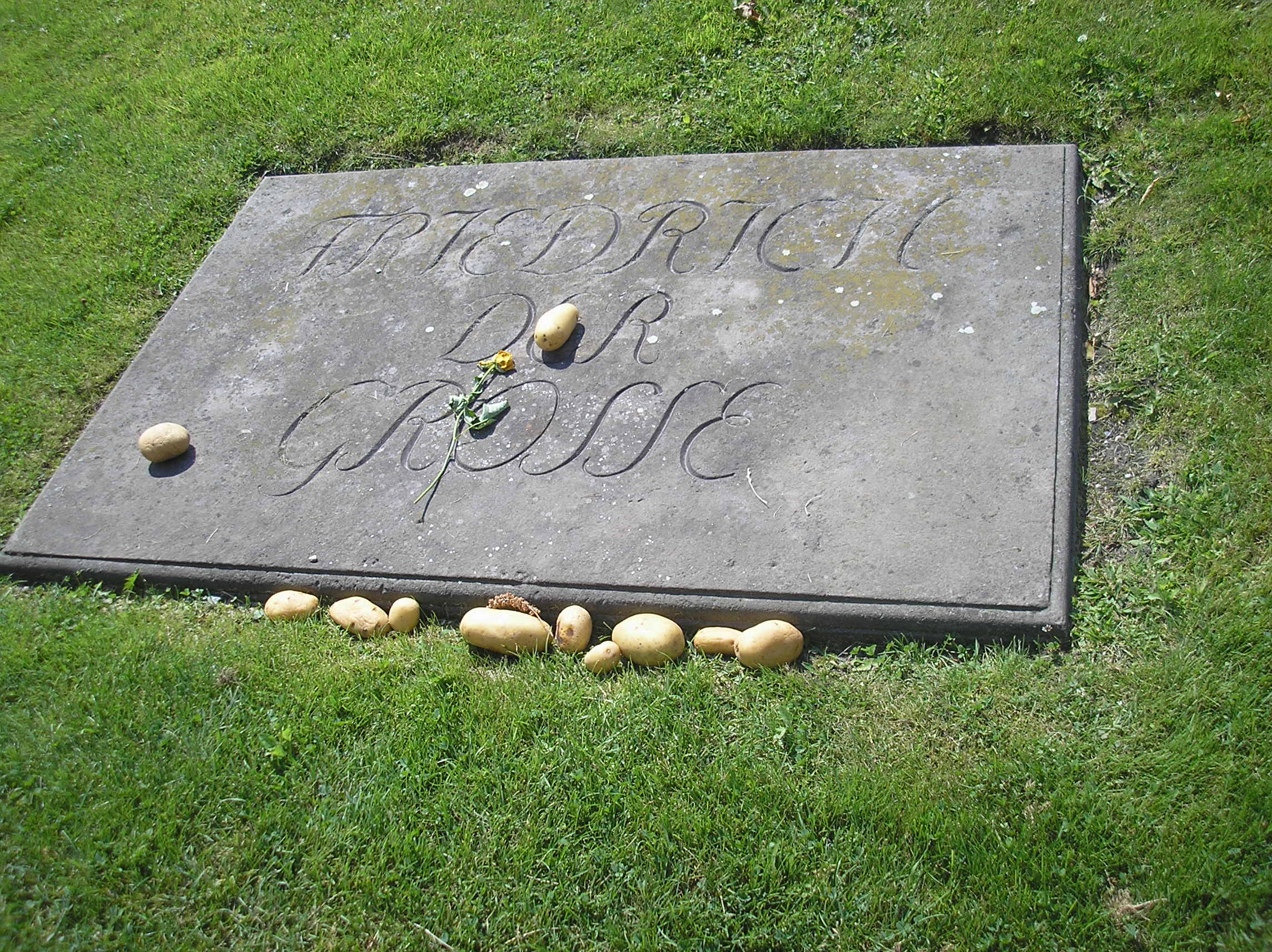
Gravestone of Frederick the Great with potatoes as grave ornaments

Historians describe the edicts as having limited immediate success, as Frederick the Great's subjects largely ignored official efforts to promote potato cultivation. The fruit was already present in parts of Germany before his reign (notably being cultivated in Bavaria since 1647, from where it was introduced to Prussia by Great Elector Frederick William) and only became widely established in the region after the Napoleonic Wars. Afterwards, however, it became a central staple of German cuisine, deeply connected to regional dishes, family traditions, and national food culture.

Their lasting impact was therefore more symbolic: Frederick would go on to become known as the "Potato King", with popular historical accounts falsely asserting that he introduced the potato to Germany and resorted to reverse psychology propaganda techniques to make the fruit seem more desirable (allegedly placing royal guards along the edge of his potato-filled palace garden to create the impression they were a valuable good reserved for the Prussian aristocracy). This legend continues to shape his public memory and tourism at Sanssouci Palace, where potato-themed merchandise is sold and visitors still leave potatoes on the former king's grave.
