= Nathaniel Crisp =

Nathaniel "The Bishop" Crisp (1762-1819) - an 18th-century character in the city of Nottingham, England.

He was the fourth child and fourth son born to gardener Hemus Crisp & Elisabeth Dodd of Nottingham. Known as Bishop Crisp, he was a butcher by trade, who carried out his business at the corner of Lister-gate and Broad-marsh in the City of Nottingham. He was the principal baptiser during the famous duckings at Nottingham in 1794, where the River Leen and the local canal served as the River Jordan, in which the baptism by immersion took place.

The sprinkling process was performed chiefly at the Exchange pump, while the spectators sang:

"We'll pump upon them till they sing, Upon their knees, God save the King".

"The Bishop" was convicted at the Spring Assizes of the following year for his riotous conduct during the ducking season, fined a nominal sum, and imprisoned for six months. He died in May, 1819.

He married Fanny Horseley in 1789, and they had four children Fanny (1792), Nathaniel (1795), Edward (1797) & Henry Nelson Crisp (1807).
