= Computer Retrieval of Information on Scientific Projects =

The CRISP (Computer Retrieval of Information on Scientific Projects) system at NIH has been replaced by the RePORT Expenditures and Results (RePORTER) query tool. CRISP was a fully searchable database of biomedical research projects funded by the U.S. government. It covers projects going back to 1972 and records name and abstract of the project, the principal investigator and the involved institution. The database is maintained by the Office of Extramural Research at the National Institutes of Health.

To facilitate indexing and searching, CRISP also contains a thesaurus and controlled vocabulary for terms used in biological and medical research. Each project is assigned three keywords from the thesaurus.

All users, including the general public, can search through the CRISP interface for scientific concepts or emerging trends and techniques that are covered by federal funding. It can also be used to identify specific projects or investigators that receive, or have received, funding.

== RePORT Expenditures and Results ==
The CRISP system has been replaced by the RePORT Expenditures and Results (RePORTER) query tool.
