= Crisp, West Virginia =

Unincorporated community in West Virginia, United States

Crisp
- Unincorporated community
- Location within the state of West Virginia Crisp (the United States)
- Coordinates: 39°22′1″N 81°6′59″W
- Country: United States
- State: West Virginia
- County: Pleasants
- Elevation: 676 ft (206 m)
- Time zone: UTC-5 (Eastern (EST))
  - Summer (DST): UTC-4 (EDT)
- GNIS ID: 1678508

Crisp was an unincorporated community in Pleasants County, West Virginia, United States. The Crisp Post Office no longer exists.
