= Jack Crisp (footballer) =

English footballer

Personal information
- Full name: John Crisp
- Date of birth: 27 November 1896
- Place of birth: Hamstead, West Midlands, England
- Date of death: 1939 (aged 42–43)
- Position: Winger

Senior career*
Years	Team	Apps	(Gls)
1912–1913	Walsall		
1913–1914	Aston Villa	0	(0)
1914	Leicester City	0	(0)
1914	Ordnance		
1914–1923	West Bromwich Albion	115	(22)
1923–1926	Blackburn Rovers	98	(18)
1926–1928	Coventry City	22	(3)
1928–1929	Stourbridge		
1929–1930	Bromsgrove Rovers		
1930	Cheltenham Town		
Total		235	(43)
- * Club domestic league appearances and goals

John Crisp (27 November 1896 – 1939) was an English footballer who played in the Football League for Blackburn Rovers, Coventry City and West Bromwich Albion.
