= Crisper drawer =

Refrigerator compartment for produce

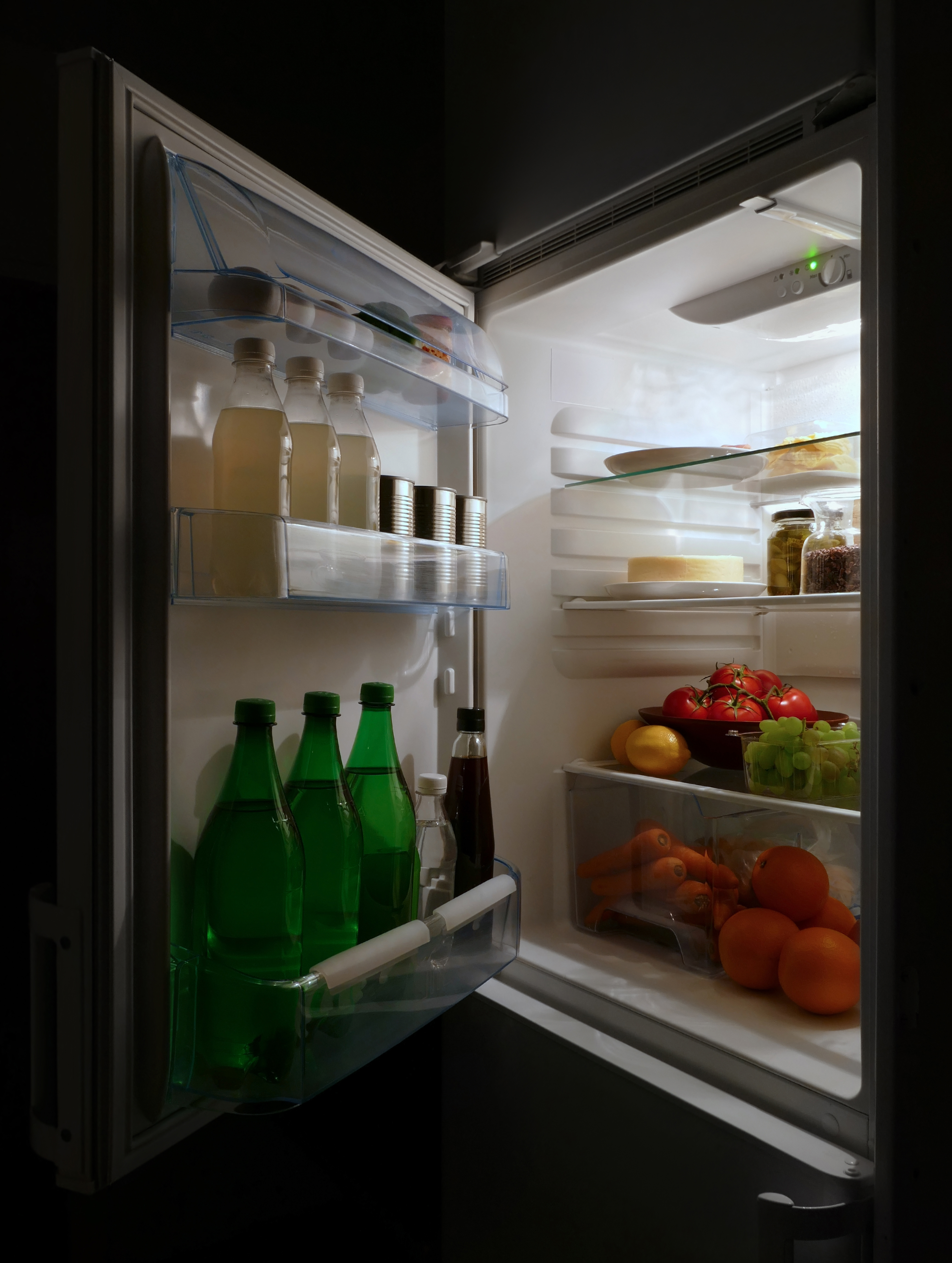
A refrigerator with a crisper drawer at the bottom of its main compartment

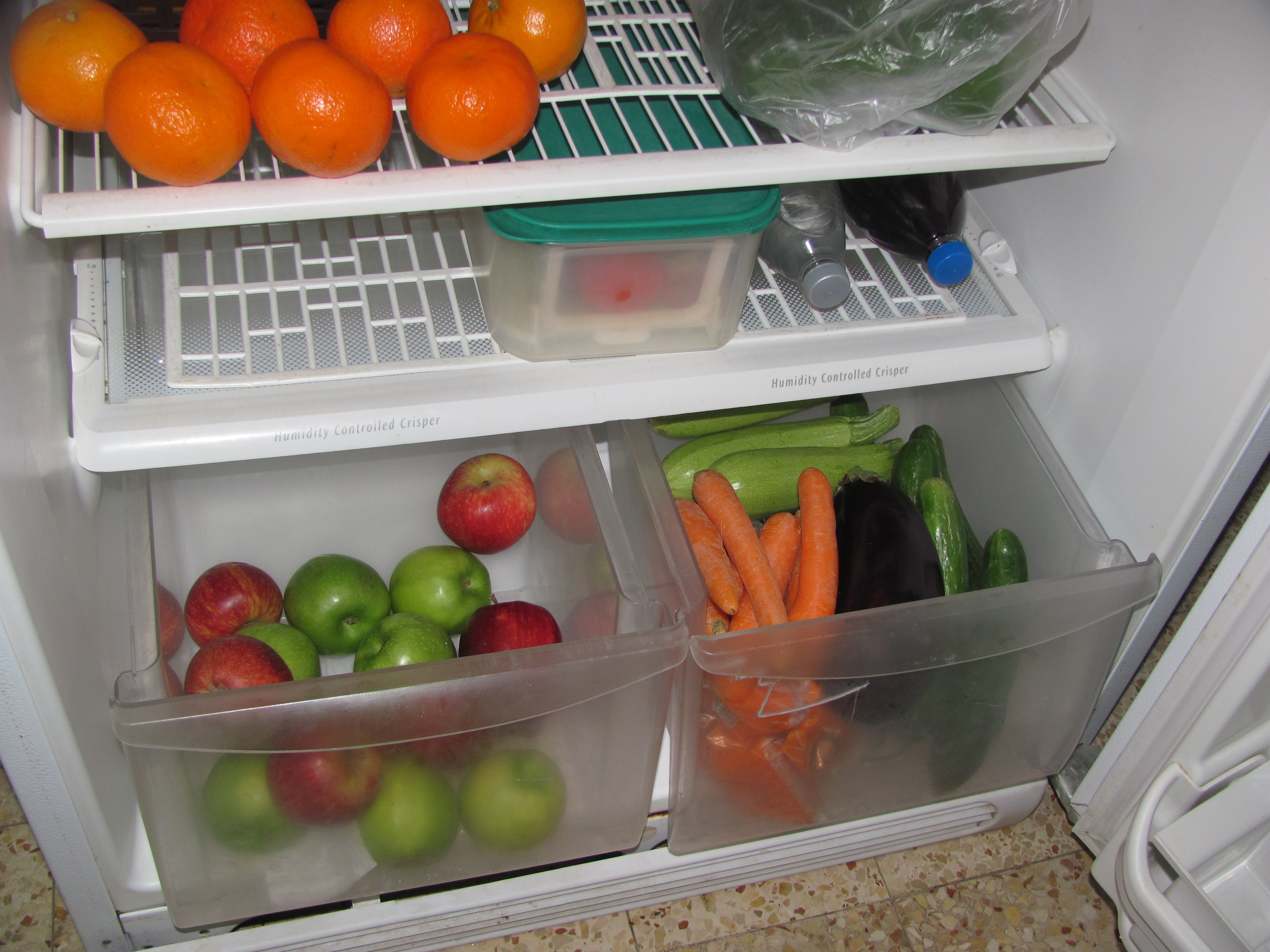
Open crisper drawers

A crisper drawer (also known as a crisper) is a compartment within a refrigerator designed to prolong the freshness of stored produce. Crisper drawers have a higher level of humidity than the rest of the refrigerator, optimizing freshness in fruits and leafy vegetables. Some can be adjusted to either prevent the loss of moisture from produce, or to allow ethylene gas produced by certain fruits to escape in order to prevent them from rotting quickly.

== Etymology ==
The first known use of the word "crisper" in relation to a crisper drawer was in 1835.

== Design and operation ==
Crisper drawers operate by creating an environment of greater humidity than the rest of the refrigerator. Many crisper drawers have a separate humidity control which closes or opens a vent in the drawer. When the vent is in the closed position, airflow is shut off, creating greater humidity in the drawer. High humidity is optimal for the storage of leafy or thin-skinned vegetables. When the vent is in the open position, airflow keeps humidity in the crisper drawer low, which is beneficial for the storage of fruits. Additionally, because some fruits emit high levels of ethylene gas, the open vent allows the ethylene gas to escape, preventing these foods from rotting. The ability to separate low-humidity fruits from high-humidity vegetables using the different crisper drawers also prevents ethylene gas from damaging the latter. Crisper drawers which do not have a humidity control are, by default, high humidity crispers.

=== Reported public confusion ===
Appliance manufacturers have reported that many refrigerator owners are unaware of the purpose or operation of crisper drawers. A 2010 survey commissioned by Robert Bosch GmbH found that 55 percent of surveyed Americans "admit to not knowing how to use their crisper drawer controls".

In the UK, sources often use the term "crisper drawer" in conjunction with a nearby explanation, like the Vegetable Expert advice website calling them "special compartments or 'crisper drawers' to store fruits and vegetables", the consumers' organisation Which? calling it a "salad crisper drawer [...] for storing your fruit and veg", and some appliance companies calling it a "fridge/freezer salad crisper".

== See also ==
- List of home appliances
