= Tocosh =

Traditional Quechua potato dish

Tocosh (also known as togosh or tocos) is a traditional Quechua food prepared from fermented potato pulp or, less commonly, maize. Tocosh dishes are often prepared for celebrations. Tocosh also has a number of medicinal uses and has antibacterial properties.

It was discovered by the Incas (or one of their subject peoples).

== Etymology ==
The word tocosh derives from the word tuqush, a Quechua word that means 'wrinkled and fermented'.

== Economic and cultural significance ==
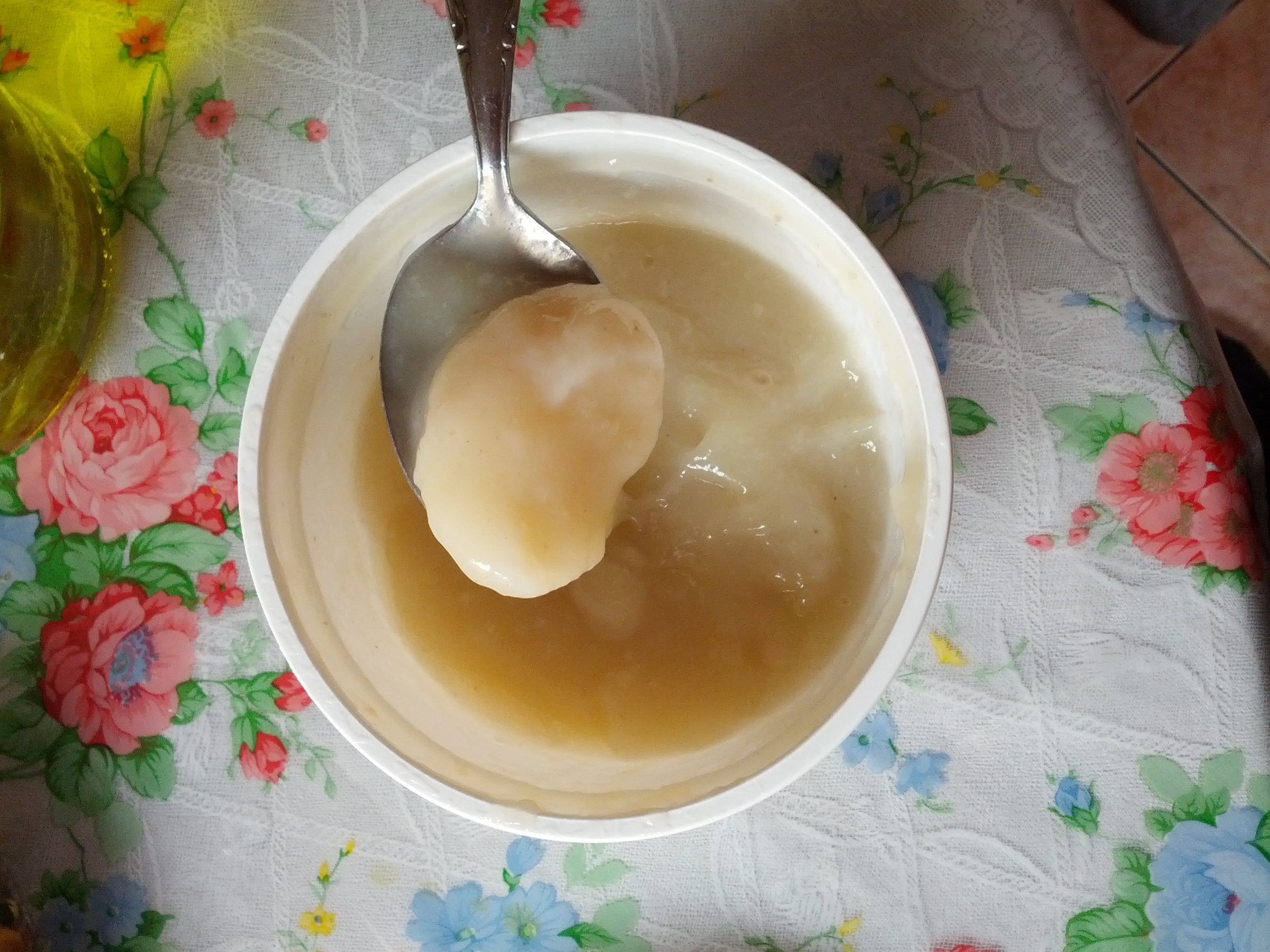
Tocosh's mazamorra.

In Peru, the three traditional tocosh-producing regions are Ancash, Huánuco and Junín. The most common preparation of tocosh in the Huánuco region involves using tocosh flour to make a jelly-like dessert called mazamorra.

Tocosh dishes are often prepared for celebratory events.

=== History ===
The fermentation process used to make tocosh was discovered by the Incas (or possibly another of the many cultures within their empire). The Incas believed that tocosh was a gift from Inti, the sun god, for the preservation of the body.

=== Medical uses ===
Potato tocosh is valued for being an effective and low-cost antibiotic, energizer, and probiotic.

Traditionally, tocosh is used during postpartum care and for treating colds, pneumonia, and wounds. Additionally, it can be used to treat hemorrhoids and gastric ulcers, gastrointestinal infections, and altitude sickness, and it protects the gastric mucosa. Due to the fermentation process used to make tocosh, it often contains antibiotics. For this reason, tocosh is sometimes called "the penicillin of the Andes."

Though made via the same process, corn tocosh does not have the same properties as potato tocosh.

Chemical composition analyses of tocosh have revealed the presence of fatty acids, free amino acids, macro- and micronutrients, and the vitamins thiamine and riboflavin, among other vitamins and minerals. The tocosh fermentation process allows these nutrients to be found in simpler, easily assimilated forms. It also increases the linoleic and calcium content.

Because of these properties, tocosh is recommended as a nutritionally beneficial food for children.

== Preparation ==
A hole 1.5 m (4 ft 11 in) deep and 1 m (3 ft 3 in) in diameter is dug in the ground, and its base and side are covered with ichu grass. Then, the well is filled with potato pulp or maize, with a layer of grass added between each 30 cm (12 in) of potatoes. When the well is full, it is covered with a final blanket of grass and topped with stones. Finally, through a small acequia (canal) the well is filled with water. Water is then allowed to run permanently through the well. A pool of water with a current (as on the bank of a stream) can also be used, and the potato or maize is placed instead in a mesh bag off grass covered with stones.

The tocosh is left in the water for a period ranging from four months to two years. When a foam with a strong rotten smell rises to the surface, the tocosh is ready to be collected. The food is then dried in the sun and can be eaten or stored.

== See also ==
- Pachamanca
- Mazamorra
