= Hippolyte Triat =

French strongman and entrepreneur

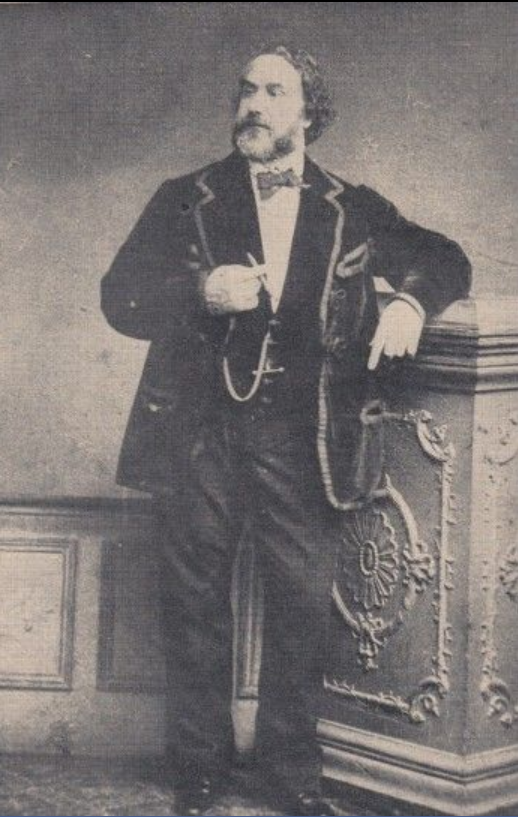
- Hippolyte Triat c. 1876–1877
- Born: Antoine Hippolyte Trilhac; 14 October 1812; Saint-Chaptes, France
- Died: 11 January 1881 (aged 68); Paris, France
- Resting place: Montmartre Cemetery
- Height: 179 cm (5 ft 10 in)
- Spouse: Marie-Françoise-Cornélie Pasquet

Antoine Hippolyte Trilhac (known as Hippolyte Triat; 14 October 1812 – 11 January 1881) was a French strongman and entrepreneur, regarded as one of the founding figures of modern physical culture and fitness centers. Born into humble circumstances, he was abducted at the age of six and sold to a troupe of Italian acrobats. While touring Spain in 1828, he was involved in an accident that forced him to leave the troupe. He was subsequently taken in and educated by a lady patron from Burgos. At the age of 22, Triat introduced an itinerant sports show featuring physique posing, which gained popularity in Spain and England. His travels eventually led him to Brussels, where he opened the first commercial gymnasium in 1840, catering primarily to the elite. He later moved to Paris and, in collaboration with Nicolas Dally, founded the "Gymnase Triat". Triat envisioned himself as a "gymnasiarch", educating aristocrats and the bourgeoisie in hygienic sports. Triat and his businesses suffered a number of setbacks during the Franco-Prussian War, particularly in the aftermath of the Paris Commune. He died in Paris in 1881.

== Biography ==
Hippolyte Triat was born Antoine Hippolyte Trilhac in Saint-Chaptes in the Gard on 14 October 1812; he was the youngest of a large family born to Marguerite Bailesse and Félix Trilhac. At the time of his child's birth, Félix, who was 50 years old, was employed as a gardener for Marie Anne Aubin de Bellevue, widow of François Paul de Brueys d'Aigalliers. Triat's older sister took charge of his upbringing in Nîmes when he lost both parents at the age of four. At six, he was kidnapped by vagabonds, then sold to a troupe of Italian acrobats in Nice. He stayed with them for seven years, traveling to Italy and Austria, before settling in Spain. Triat became a mascot, was dressed as a girl, and worked as a rope dancer in the troupe under the name of Isela. In 1825, the troupe disbanded, and he remained with a Spaniard known as Consuelo, and formed with the man and two of his sons, a weightlifting and physique posing group called "Les Alcides". Triat became popular in Spain and was known by the nickname of "L'Enfant" (The Child). On tour in Burgos in 1828, he tried to stop a runaway horse and its hooves broke his left leg. The accident forced him to remain in Burgos for a long time. He was taken in by the wealthy Mme Montsento, who acted as his benefactor, paying for him to be educated at the Jesuit college of Burgos, where he remained until he was 22. During this time he learned French and Spanish, and read classical and renaissance gymnastics and physical education literature volumes in the school library. Among these books were the works of Girolamo Mercuriale, d'Andry, and Chevalier Capriani. Desbonnet states that Triat continued physical training during this period and read works on gymnastics and physical education.

In 1834, Triat organized an itinerant show that included displays of his physique. Later historians of physical culture have compared such displays with the physique performances popularized later in the century. His acts were met with success in Spain and England, and took him as far as Brussels, where he opened his first gymnasium at 7 Rue de Ligne in 1840; the gymnasium attracted an affluent clientele and operated until 1849. Triat moved to Paris around 1846, and joined forces with Nicolas Dally (1795–1862) to found a joint-stock company with the aim of opening a large gymnasium on the Allée des Veuves, the future Avenue Montaigne. This 40 m × 21 m (131 ft × 69 ft) space became known as the "Gymnase Triat", changing location several times. In 1848, Triat and Dally wrote a letter to the Provisional Government calling for the creation of a Ministry of Physical Education. In 1855, due to the maintenance demands of the existing premises, Triat relocated his operations across the street to number 36.

Triat saw himself as a "gymnasiarch", a hygienic sports educator with orthopedic aims. His pupils and clients included aristocrats and members of the Parisian haute bourgeoisie. Among them were Prince Charles-Louis Napoléon Bonaparte, novelist Paul Féval, and authors Jules Vallès and Eugène Paz. At the end of the 1860s, having earned up to 400,000 francs in revenue, he planned a large sports complex on the Île Saint-Germain, a "gymnastics school", the plans for which were drawn up by Théodore Charpentier's son. The Franco-Prussian war compromised the project. Triat, reclusive in Paris at the time of the Paris Commune, was appointed by Jules Allix, a communard, to lead a battalion of gymnasts. Triat became further implicated when he permitted his gymnasium to be used for meetings. Denounced, Triat was imprisoned by the National Assembly loyalists, then released in July 1871. The Triat gymnasium still existed in 1872, advertising its new hydrotherapy-based treatments.

In 1873, Triat moved gym to a final, smaller space at 22 Rue du Bouloi. He participated in the 1878 Universal Exhibition where he presented a scale model of his gymnasium, which closed the following year. Triat, who left a widow named Marie-Françoise-Cornélie Pasquet, died at 22 Rue Jean-Jacques Rousseau in Paris on 11 January 1881: Jules Allix paid tribute to him and allowed his remains to be buried in his family's tomb in the Montmartre Cemetery.

== Appearance and legacy ==
According to French physical culturist and academic Edmond Desbonnet, Triat measured 1.79 m (5.9 ft) tall in 1854, and weighed 95 kg (209 lb). He was capable of lifting a 91 kg (201 lb) dumbbell. In his Parisian gymnasium, he played master of ceremonies and trained athletes collectively in various strength disciplines, which the public could watch: "Triat, doing away with complicated apparatus, invented his method, where the pupil, with a pair of 6-pound dumbbells, a 12-pound bar and a few clubs, acquires good muscularity before tackling suspension exercises, climbing, jumps, etc."

Triat is credited with opening the first commercial gymnasium in Belgium. He is featured in a number of paintings; Ernest Hébert's painting, Esclave près d'un tombeau dans la campagne romaine (1841 [?], Musée Hébert) is said to have been inspired by the athlete; another, showing him in mid-body carrying a club, identifies him as "Gymnasiarch, Grand Master founder of the Order of the Regeneration of Man". He is also featured on a medallion portrait engraved by Maurice Borrel (Salon of 1855), and an enamel portrait (Salon of 1878) by Thérèse-Mirza Allix. In weightlifting, it was customary to call certain weights "Triat dumbbells".

== Gallery ==
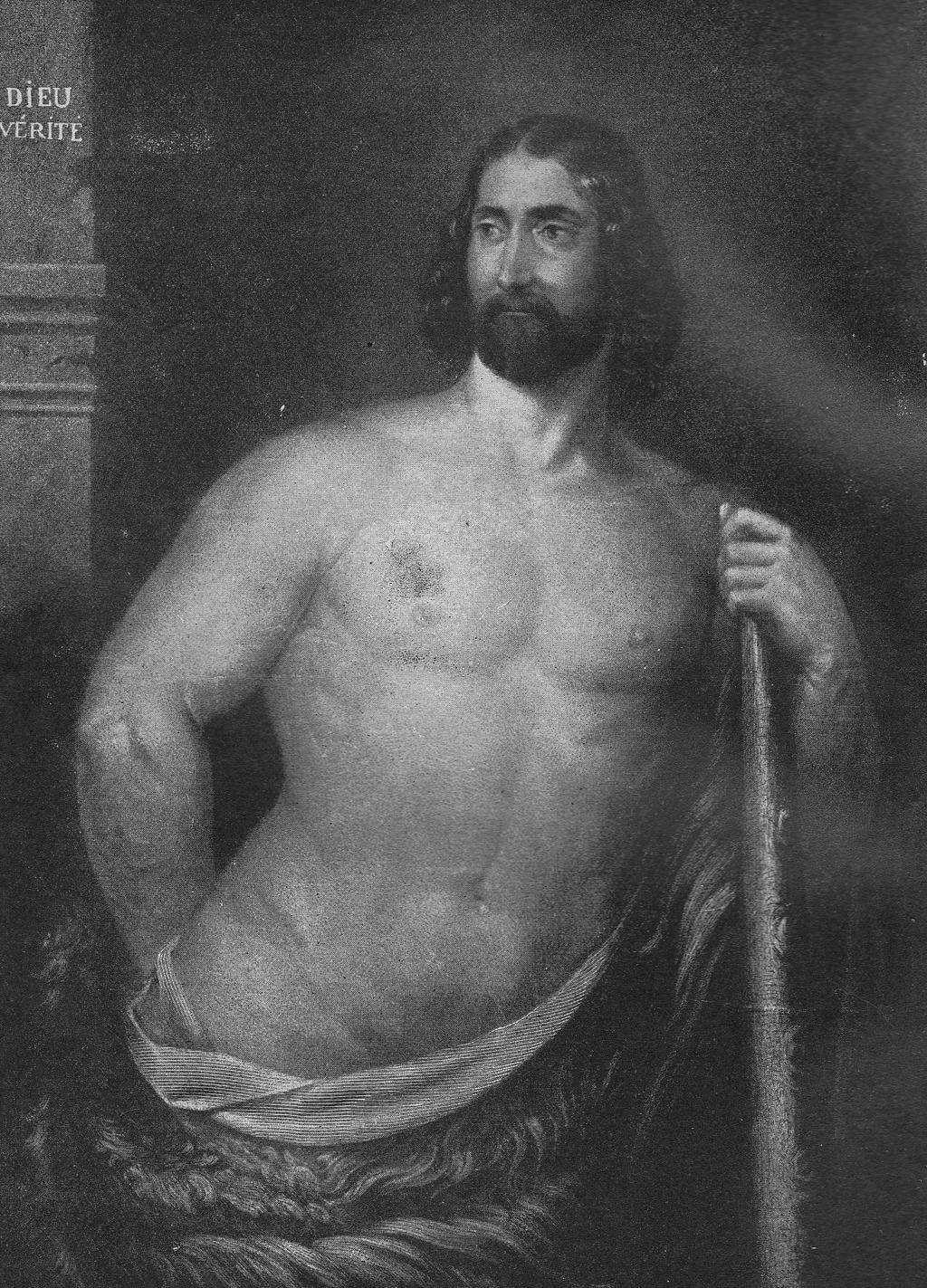
Hippolyte Triat, engraving after a painting. Unknown artist. Reproduced in La Culture physique, Paris: September 1912.

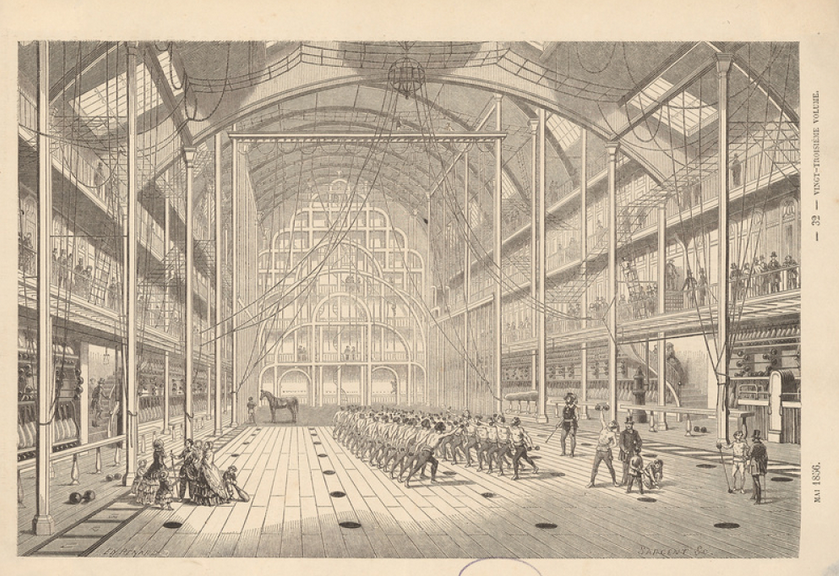
View of the Triat Gymnasium by E. Renard, Musée des familles, mai 1856.

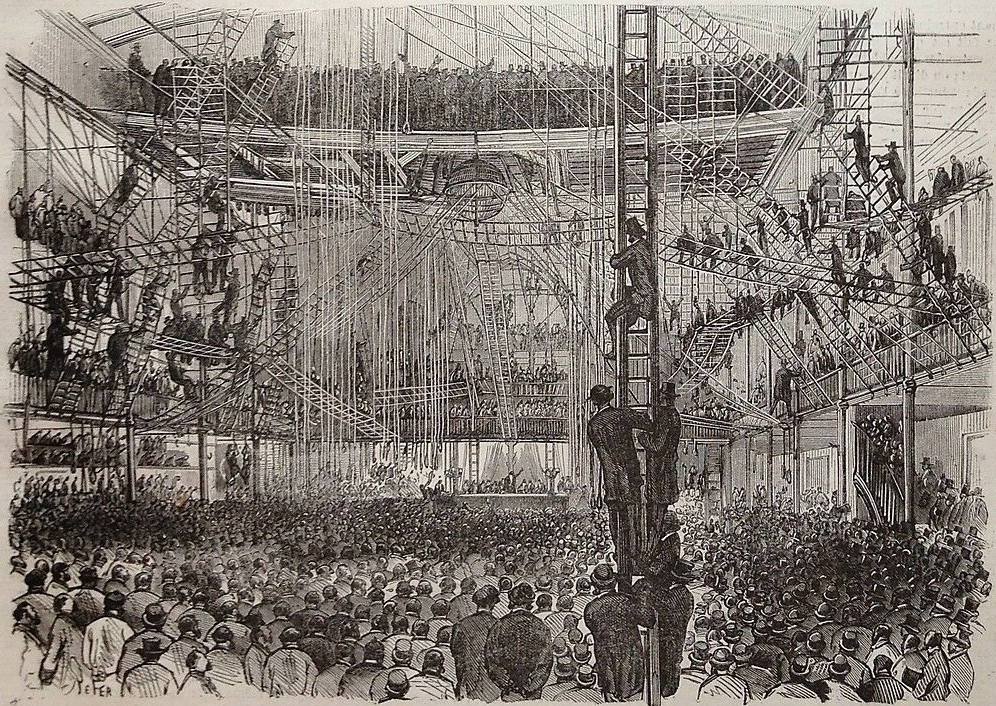
The Triat Gymnasium hosting an electoral congress (Le Monde illustré, 22 May1869).

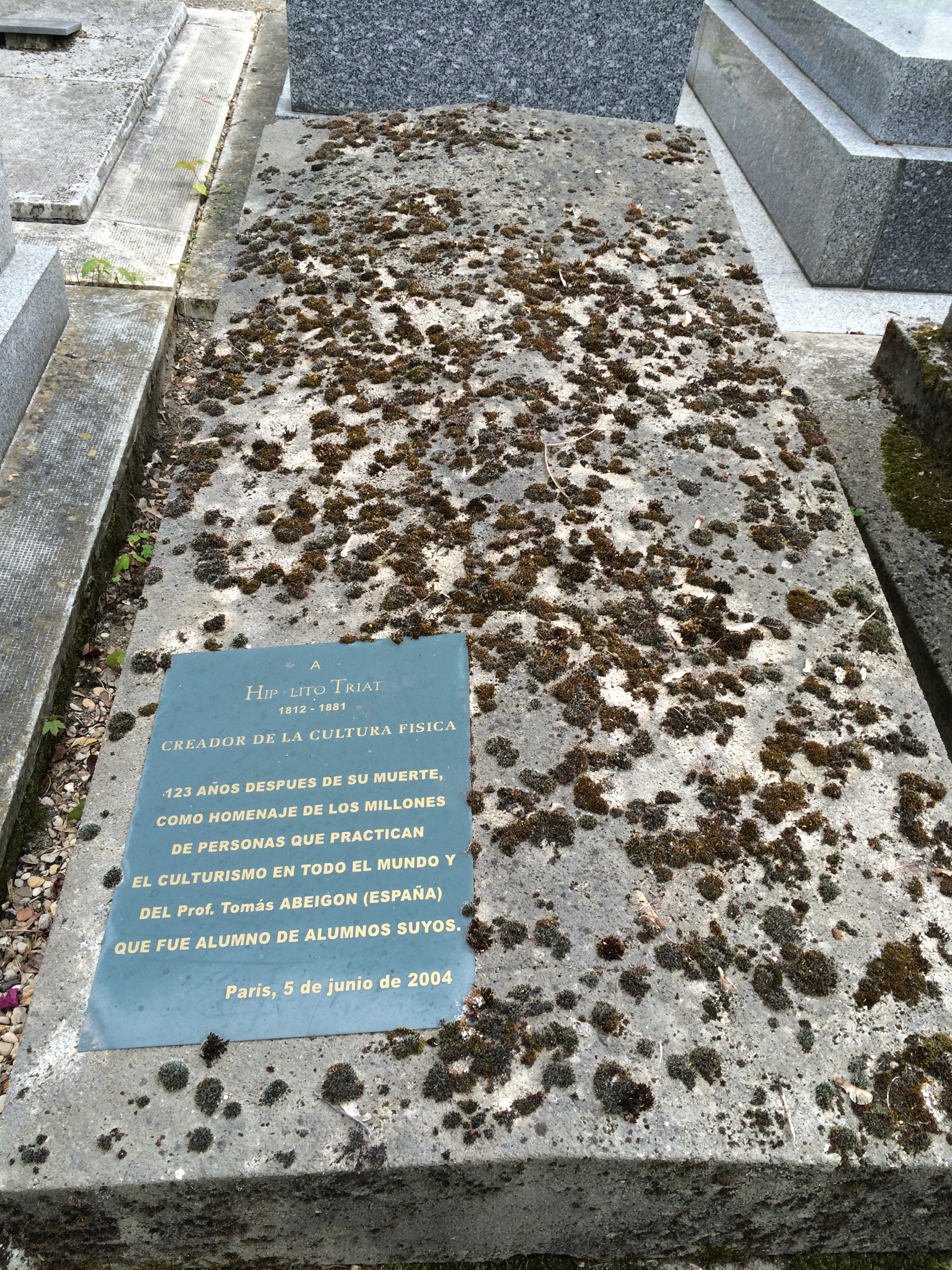
Final resting place in Montmartre Cemetery.
