= Augustine Allix =

French opera singer, pianist (1823–1901)

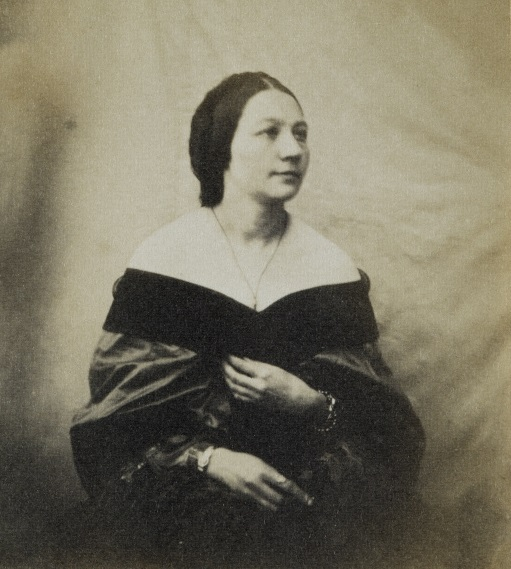

Background information
- Born: 4 May 1823; Fontenay-le-Comte
- Died: 15 January 1901 (aged 77) Paris
- Instruments: piano; vocals

Augustine Allix (4 May 1823 − 15 January 1901) was a French singer, pianist and teacher of music and song, having been part of the close entourage of the family of Victor Hugo during the latter's exile to Jersey and Guernsey.

== Life ==
Born in Fontenay-le-Comte on 4 May 1823, Augustine Allix, together with her sisters Thérèse-Mirza, Bathilde, Eudoxie and Céline, ran an institution for young girls in their home town between 1842 and 1847. The Allix sisters' boarding school then moved to Paris in 1847, with Augustine assisting her sister Eudoxie in the direction of the institution's music course.

A student of the singer and educator François Delsarte, Allix began a singing career on the Parisian stage that same year. Between 1847 and 1853, she performed several melodies and compositions, including La Danse au bois, a romance composed by Oscar Comettant and written by Adolphe Favre Le Lac by Louis Niedermeyer, La Sympathie by Charles Haas, Ruth et Booz, a poem composed by Eugène Villemain and written by Antoine Elwart, Le Mariage de Hasard, composed by Eudoxie Péan de la Roche-Jagu.

In 1854, Allix settled in Jersey, where many French exiles fleeing the Second Empire regime settled, including the poet and writer Victor Hugo with his family, as well as his two brothers Jules Allix, a republican activist, and Émile Allix, a young medical student, who soon became Victor Hugo's doctor. She gave concerts for the proscribed, attended by Hugo, gave music lessons and sang songs to the words of Hugo's poems. She frequented Hugo's family during his years of exile, eventually becoming very close to his son Charles Hugo, with whom she was said to have had a romantic relationship.

When the Hugo family were expelled from Jersey and moved to Guernsey towards the end of 1855, Augustine also moved there and remained until October 1861. She continued to give concerts and piano lessons for the outcasts and remained very close to the Hugos, being a regular visitor to their home at Hauteville House.

Allix was among those photographed by Charles Hugo and by Auguste Vacquerie, a friend of Victor Hugo, during the period of exile in Jersey and Guernsey. Several photographs taken by Hugo and Vacquerie were collected in an album given to Augustine, known as the Allix Album or Souvenir de Marine Terrace, now kept in the Maison de Victor Hugo.

On her return to France in 1861, Allix taught music and singing in Paris, following the teaching method created by Émile Chevé and supported by her sister Eudoxie Allix, founder of music classes. In 1865, at a ceremony for the inauguration of a bust of Émile Chevé, she sang a cantata composed by Théodore Ritter for the occasion. She died at her Paris home on 15 January 1901 at the age of 77.
