= Louis Bazire =

French politician

Louis Bazire (30 September 1877, Fontenay-le-Comte - 19 December 1923) was a French politician. He represented the Republican Federation in the Chamber of Deputies from 1919 to 1923.
