= Fontenay-le-Comte =

- Subprefecture and commune
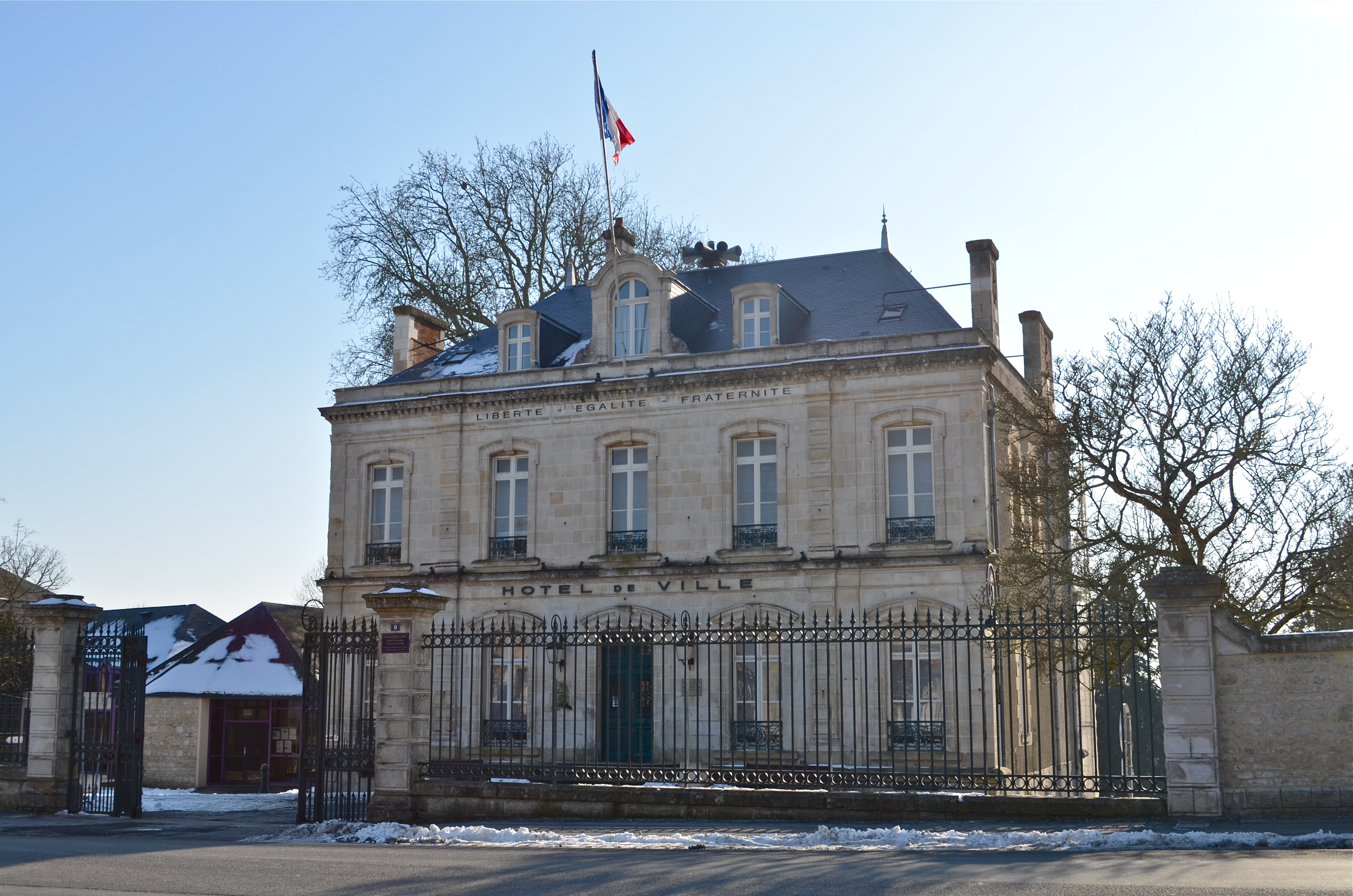
- Fontenay-le-Comte Town Hall

- Coat of arms
- Location of Fontenay-le-Comte
- Location within France Location within Pays de la Loire
- Coordinates: 46°27′58″N 0°48′22″W
- Country: France
- Region: Pays de la Loire
- Department: Vendée
- Arrondissement: Fontenay-le-Comte
- Canton: Fontenay-le-Comte
- Intercommunality: Pays de Fontenay-Vendée

Government
  - Mayor (2020–2026): Ludovic Hocbon
- Area^{1}: 34.05 km^{2} (13.15 sq mi)
  - Urban: 67.4 km^{2} (26.0 sq mi)
  - Metro: 587.4 km^{2} (226.8 sq mi)
- Elevation: 24 m (79 ft)
- Highest elevation: 68 m (223 ft)
- Lowest elevation: 2 m (6.6 ft)
- Population (2023): 14,059
  - Density: 412.9/km^{2} (1,069/sq mi)
  - Urban (2022): 17,111
  - Urban density: 254/km^{2} (658/sq mi)
  - Metro (2022): 41,956
  - Metro density: 71.43/km^{2} (185.0/sq mi)
- Demonym: Fontenaisiens
- Time zone: UTC+01:00 (CET)
  - Summer (DST): UTC+02:00 (CEST)
- INSEE/Postal code: 85092 /85200
- Website: www.fontenay-le-comte.fr
- ^{1} French Land Register data, which excludes lakes, ponds, glaciers > 1 km^{2} (0.386 sq mi or 247 acres) and river estuaries.

Fontenay-le-Comte (French: [fɔ̃tənɛ l(ə) kɔ̃t]; lit. 'Fontenay-the-Count'; Poitevin: Funtenaes or Fintenè) is a commune and subprefecture in the Vendée department in the Pays de la Loire region of Western France. In 2022, it had a population of 13,806, while its functional area had a population of 41,956. It is southeast of La Roche-sur-Yon, on the Vendée River.

== Geography ==
The river Vendée flows through the town. The town has an area of 34 km^{2} (13 sq mi).

== History ==
Fontenay was in existence as early as the time of the Gauls. The affix of comte is said to have been applied to it when it was taken by King Louis IX from the family of Lusignan and given to his brother Alphonse, count of Poitou, under whom it became capital of Bas-Poitou. Ceded to the Plantagenets by the Treaty of Brétigny in 1360, it was retaken in 1372 by du Guesclin. It suffered repeated capture during the 16th-century French Wars of Religion, was dismantled in 1621 and was occupied both by the Republicans and the Royalists during the War in the Vendée (1793). From 1790 to 1806, it was the seat of the Vendée department.

== Population ==
Historical population
Year	Pop.	±% p.a.
1968	12,939	—
1975	15,275	+2.40%
1982	15,295	+0.02%
1990	14,456	−0.70%
1999	13,792	−0.52%
2007	14,464	+0.60%
2012	14,044	−0.59%
2017	13,226	−1.19%
2023	14,059	+1.02%
Source: INSEE

== Miscellaneous ==
At Maison Laval on rue Rabelais, a townhouse built at the end of the 18th Century, Emperor Napoleon 1st and his wife, Joséphine, spent the night of 7–8 August 1808. On their way from Rochefort to Nantes, they had stopped off in the Bas-Poitou capital of Fontenay-le-Comte where they were the guests of Mayor Laval who, to give them a dignified welcome, had prepared a triumphal arch over the Pont Neuf bridge. That night, the Emperor learned of the defeat of General Dupont at Bailem. The General's surrender, which seriously compromised the French army's position in Spain, threw the Emperor into a deep rage. If word is to be believed, the Emperor smashed an earthenware vase placed in front of him.

== Personalities ==
- François Rabelais (c. 1493?–1553) was a Franciscan friar at Fontenay-le-Comte, where he studied Greek and Latin, as well as science, philology, and law.
- François_Viète, (c. 1540–1603), mathematician "father of modern algebraic notation".
- Georges Simenon (1903–1989) the Belgian writer, author of the Maigret series and other books, stayed at the Chateau de Terreneuve during the war. Several stories are based in the Vendée, and at least one in Fontenay. There is a Simenon tour.

Fontenay-le-Comte was the birthplace of:

- Augustine Allix (1823–1901), singer, pianist and teacher
- Thérèse-Mirza Allix (1816–1882), artist
- Louis Bazire (1877–1923), politician
- Barnabé Brisson (1531–1591), jurist and politician
- Mathurin Jacques Brisson (1723–1806), zoologist and natural philosopher.
- Michel Crépeau (1930–1999), politician
- Jamy Gourmaud (1964–), journalist
- Michael De Jong (1945-2018), Dutch blues musician
- Frederic Mazella (1976–), an entrepreneur and funder of BlaBlaCar
- François Viète (1540–1603), mathematician

== Main sights ==
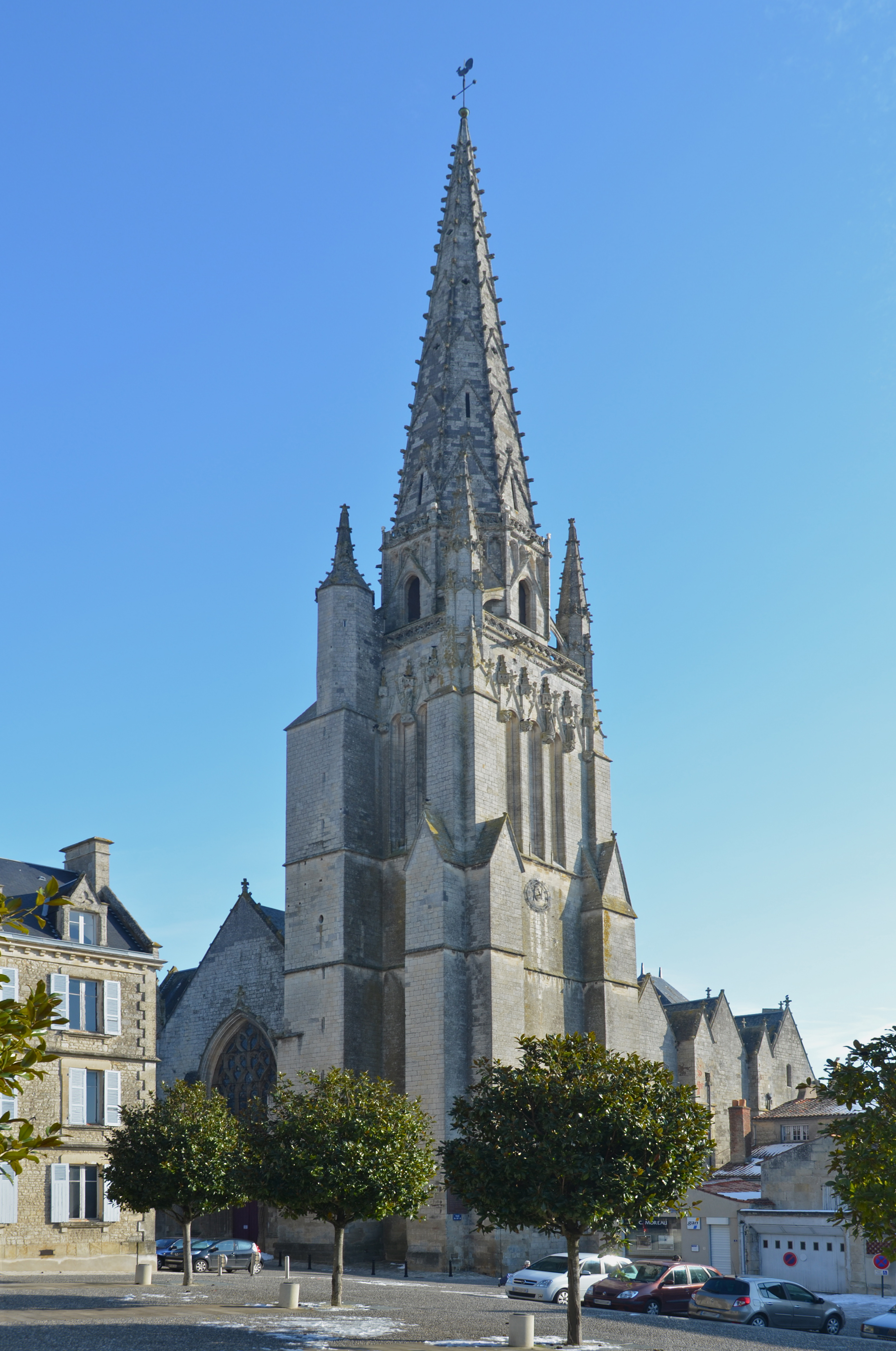
Notre-Dame church

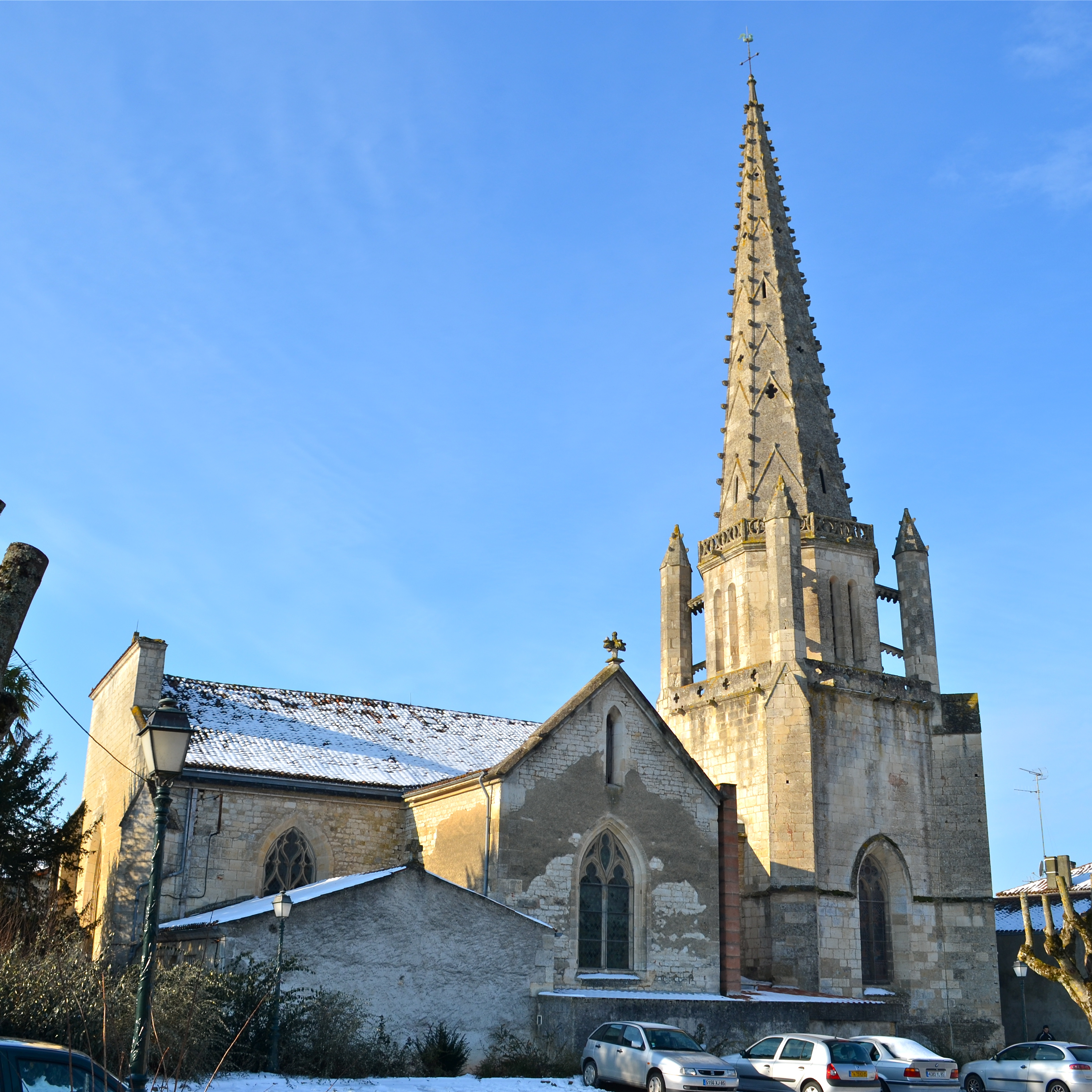
Saint-Jean church

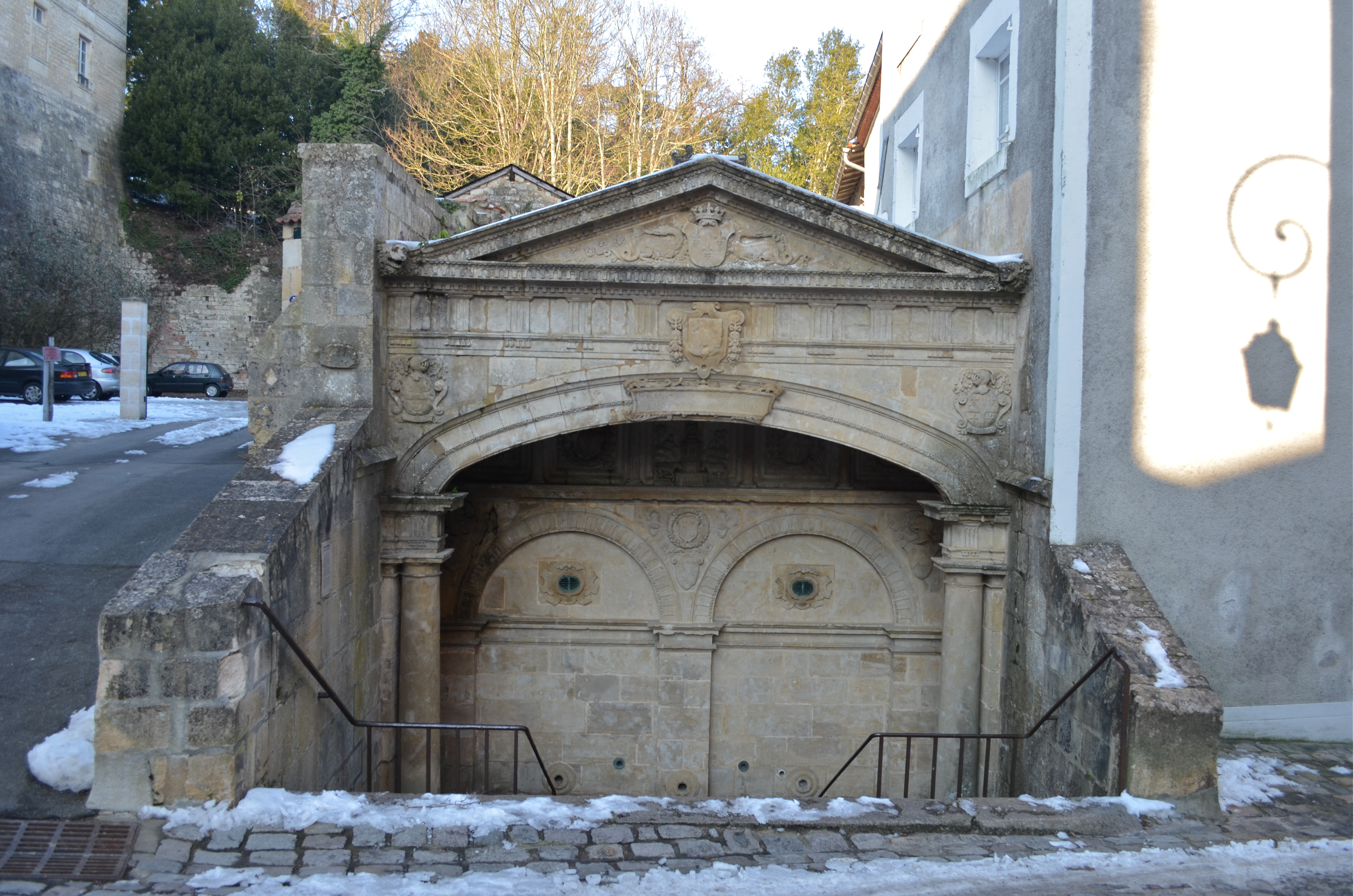
Quatre Tias' fountain

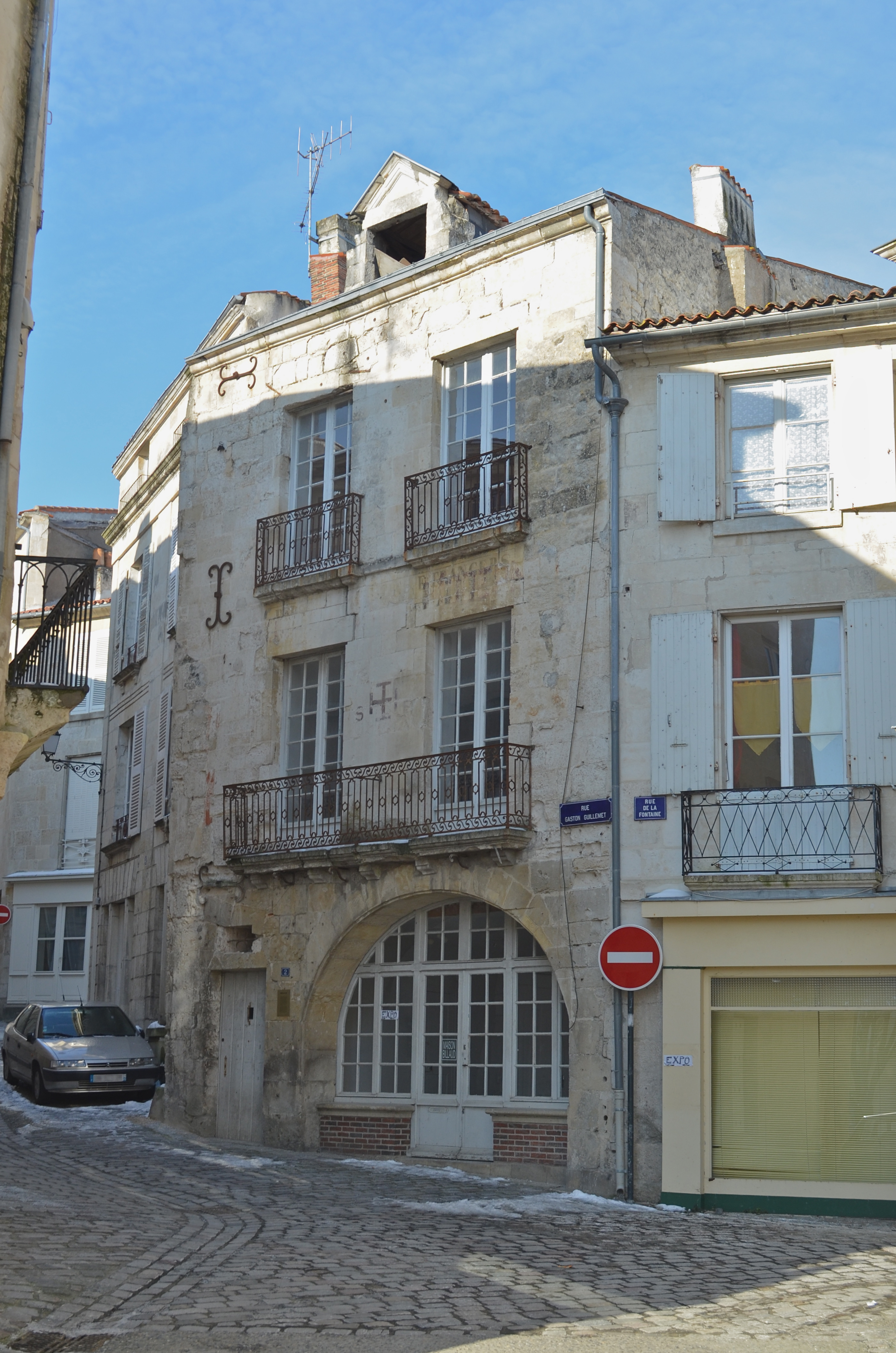
Billaud house

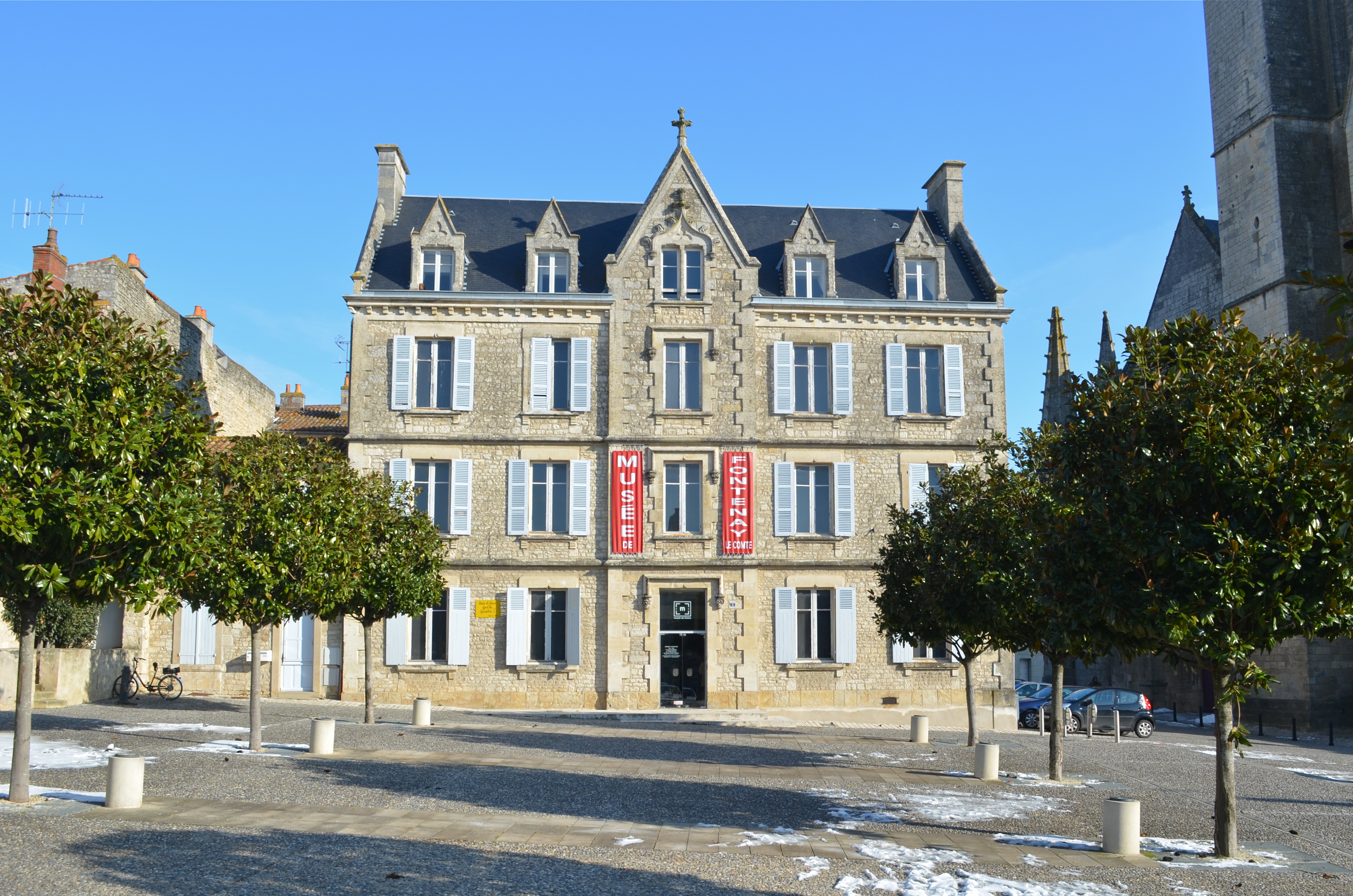
Museum

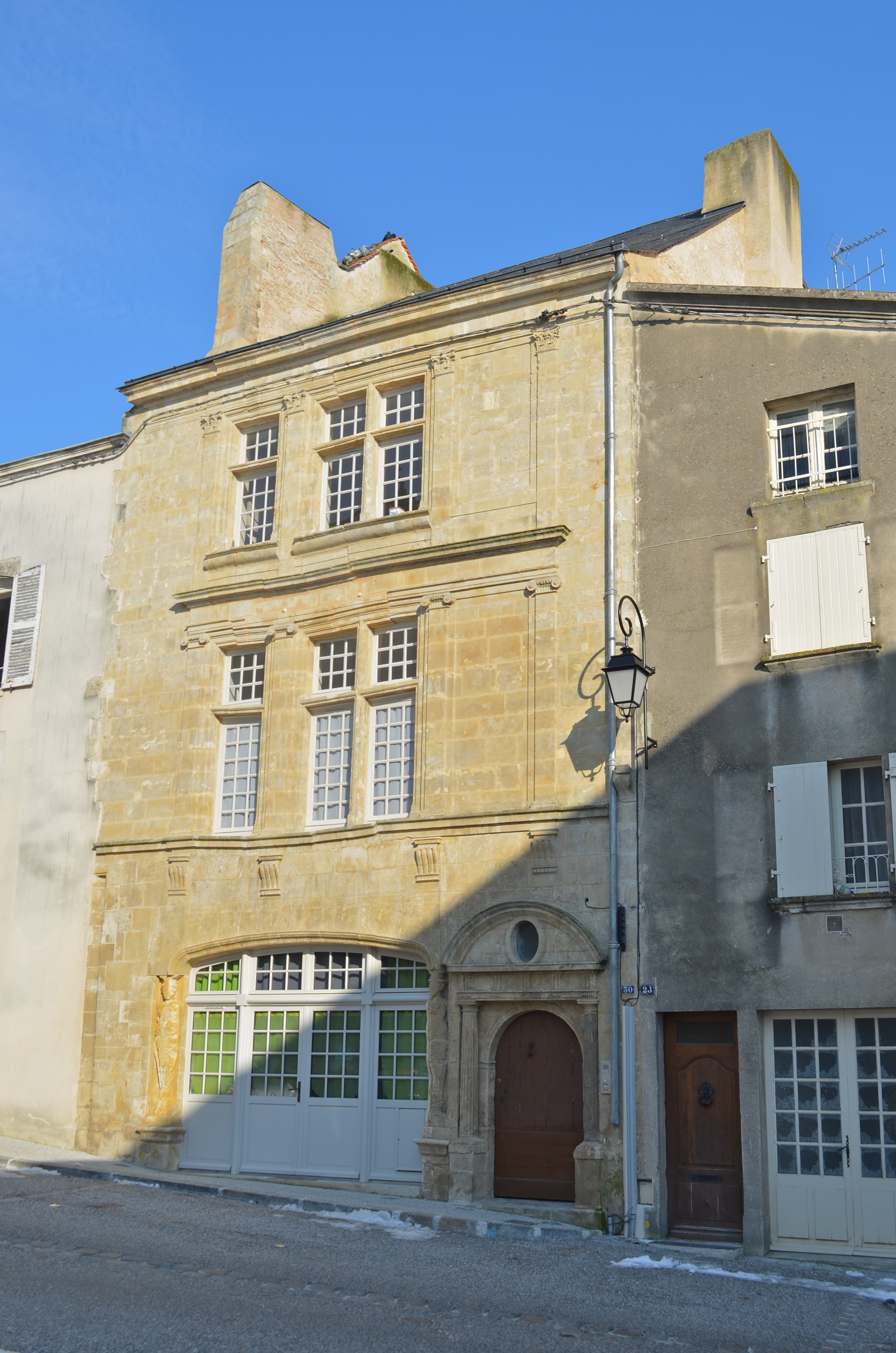
François Viète's house

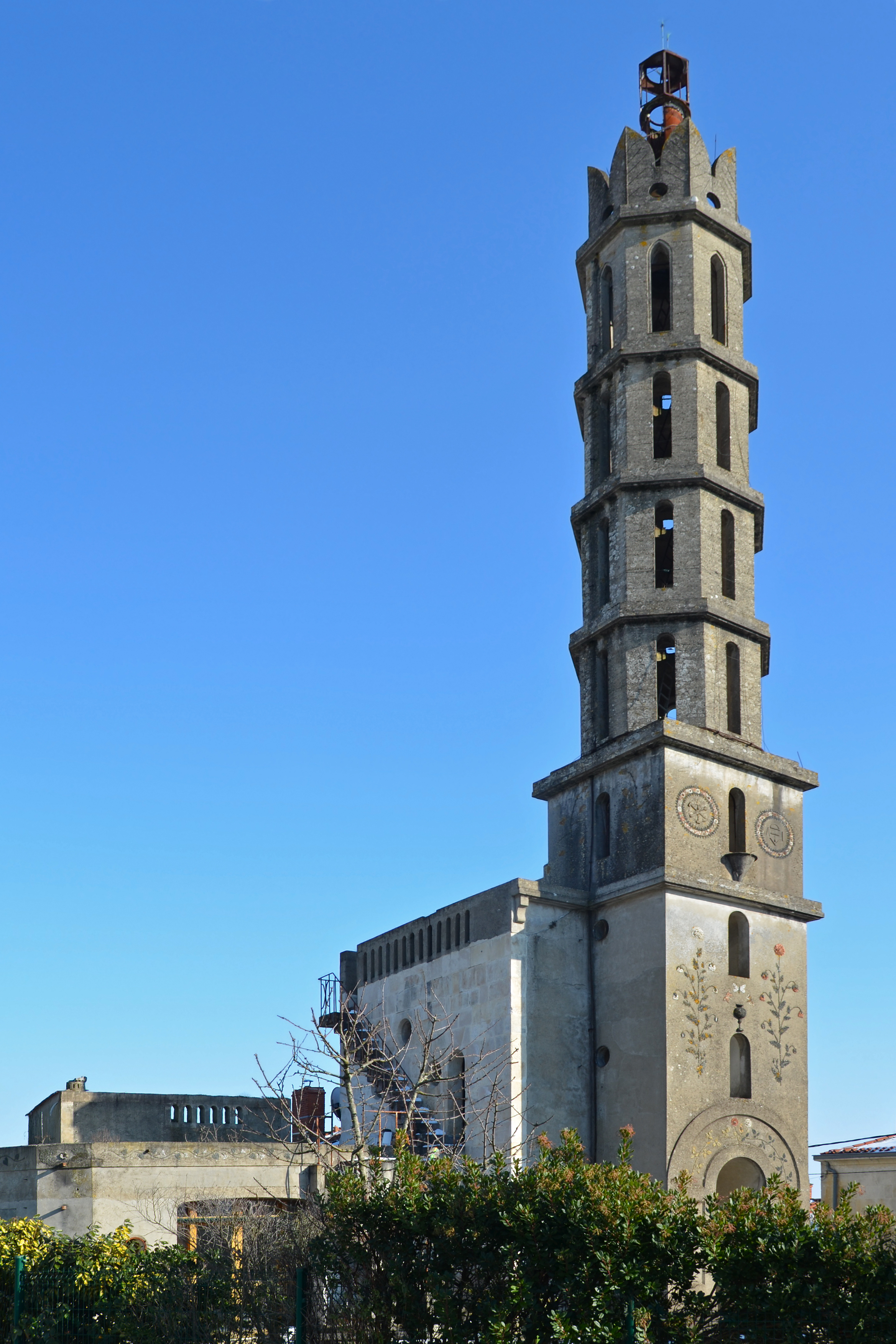
Rivalland tower

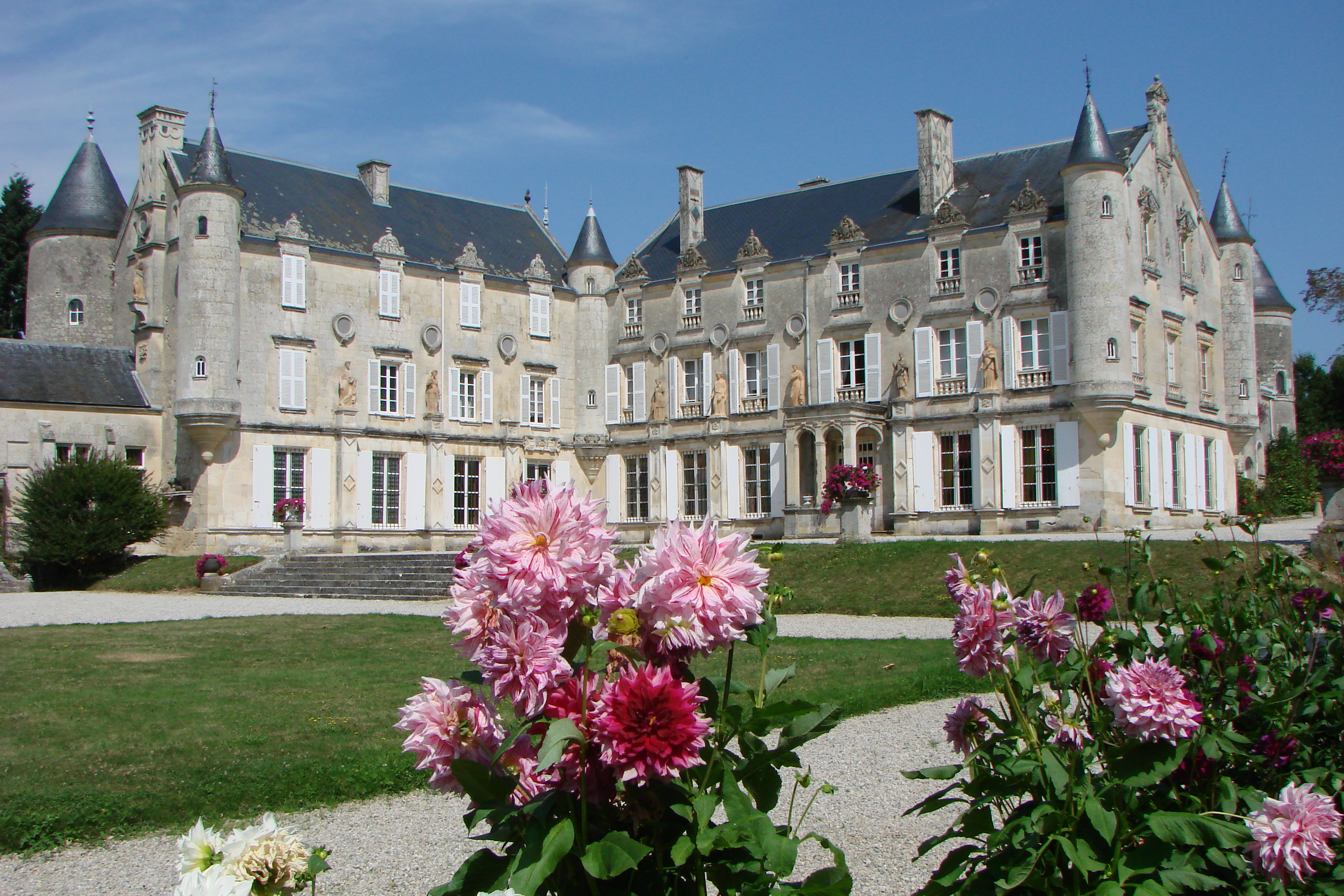
The Château de Terre-Neuve

== Twin towns – sister cities ==
Fontenay-le-Comte is twinned with:

- Crevillent, Spain
- Diosig, Romania
- Gaoua, Burkina Faso
- Krotoszyn, Poland
- Palatine, United States

== See also ==
- Communes of the Vendée department
