= Sympathetic alphabet =

Pseudoscientific communication method

A sympathetic alphabet was a supposed form of communication used in the 17th century by Rosicrusians and Magnetisers. Two parties would remove a section of skin from their arms or hands and mutually transplant it while still fresh. It was believed that the transplanted piece of flesh kept a close sympathy with the original limb so that its owner was still aware of any injury done to it. On the transplanted flesh was tattooed an alphabet whereby, by pricking the letters with a magnetic needle, the users believed they could communicate instantaneously across great distances.

A similar myth from the same time period claimed that needles alone could be used to communicate over long distances. After touching two needles against a "special species of lodestone," they would become "sympathetic" to each other, and from then on always point in the same direction regardless of distance. These needles would then be installed inside a dial, with the alphabet listed around the rim. By pointing one of the needles in the direction of a particular letter the other needle would follow suit, allowing for distant correspondence. The early Cooke and Wheatstone electric telegraph also worked by deflecting magnetic needles, but without the need to resort to magic needles. Their needles were deflected using electromagnetic induction.

The 1862 novel Le nez d'un notaire by Edmond About, adapted as a television movie in 1972, is based on the concept of a sympathetic alphabet.

== See also ==
- Pasilalinic-sympathetic compass
