= Health club =

Venue housing physical exercise equipment

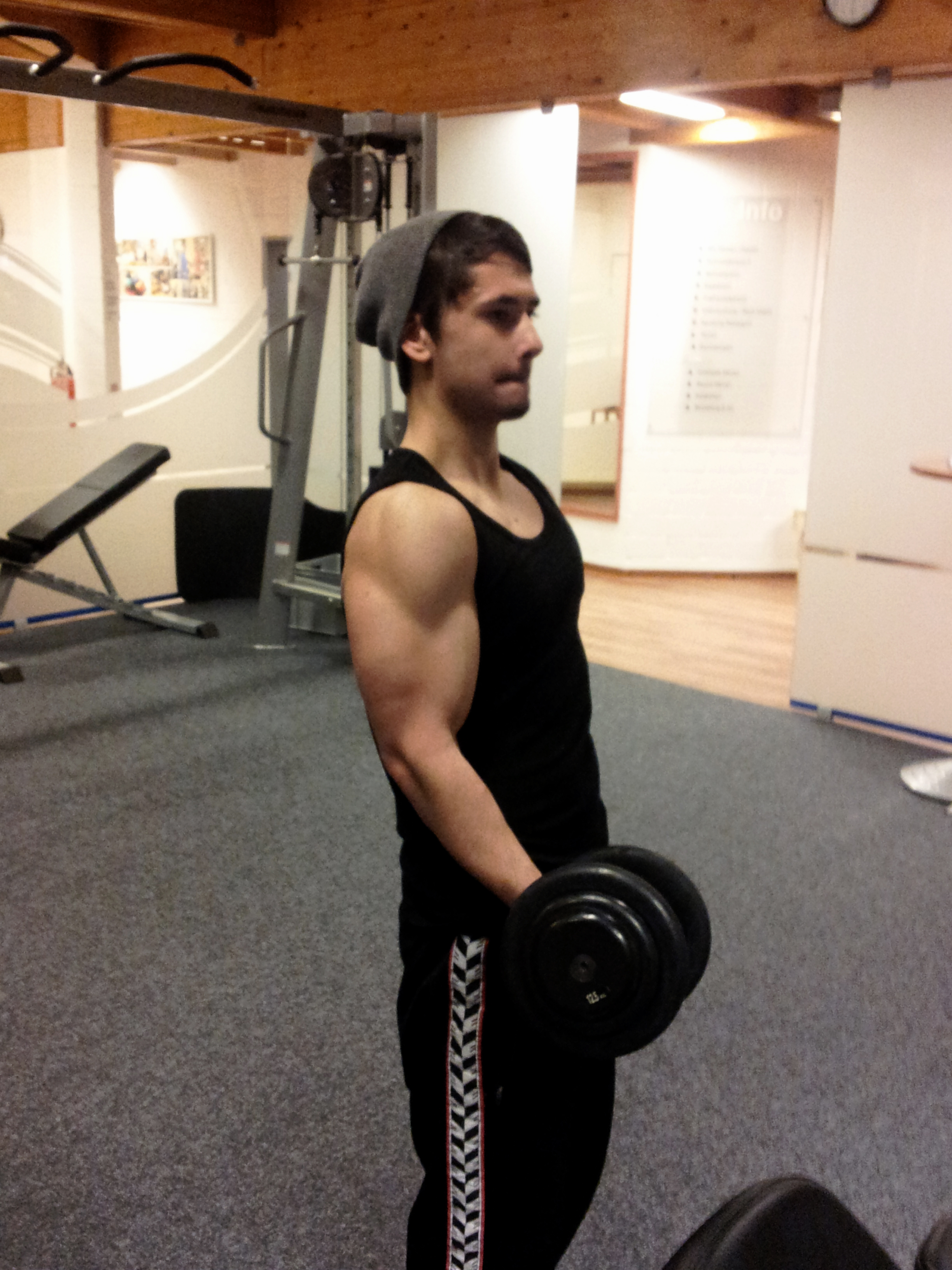
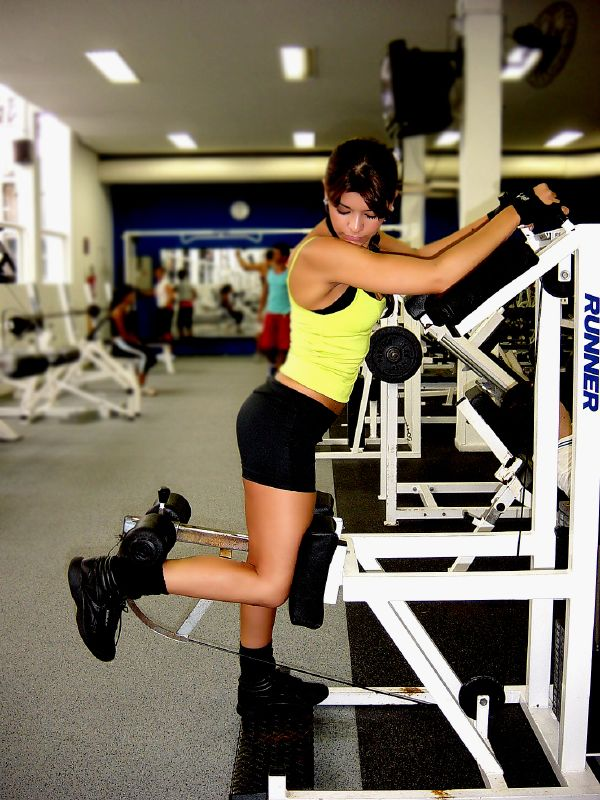
A man and a woman doing weight training

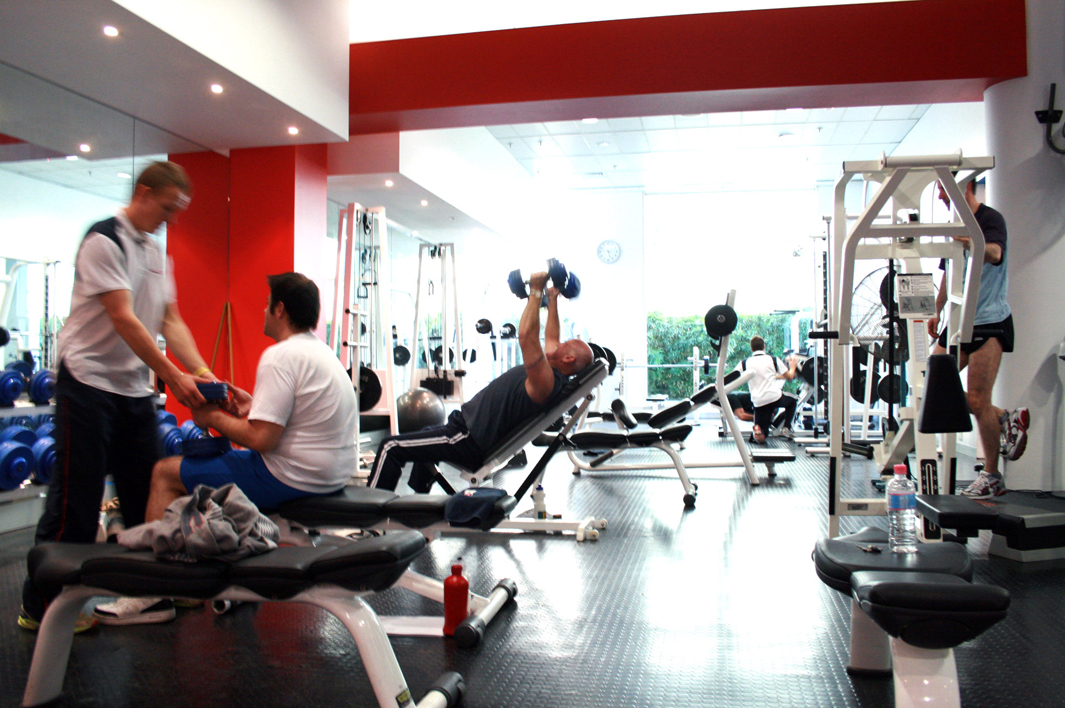
View of a health club

A health club (also known as a fitness club, fitness center, health spa, weight room and commonly referred to as a gym) is a place that houses, and usually an organization that maintains, exercise equipment for the purpose of physical exercise.

In recent years, the number of fitness and health services have increased, expanding the interest among the population. Today, health clubs and fitness centers are a reference of health services, rising the adherence to physical activity.

== Facilities and services ==
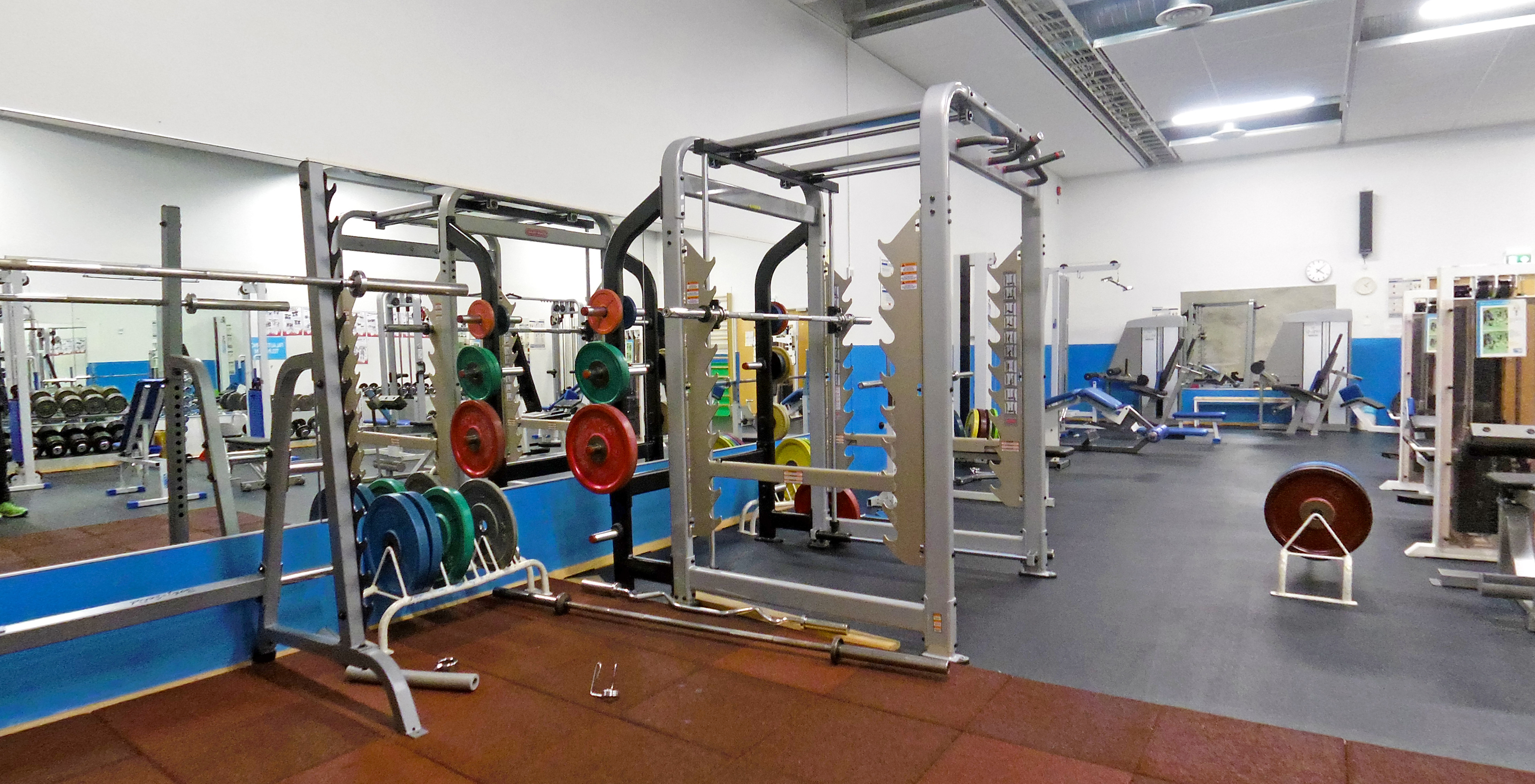
A gym in Kuokkala, Jyväskylä, Finland

=== Main workout area ===
Most health clubs have a main workout area, which primarily consists of free weights including dumbbells and barbells and the stands and benches used with these items and exercise machines, which use gears, cables and other mechanisms to guide the user's exercise. This area often includes mirrors so that exercisers can monitor and maintain correct posture during their workout. A gym that predominantly or exclusively consists of free weights (dumbbells and barbells), as opposed to exercise machines, is sometimes referred to as a black-iron gym, after the traditional color of weight plates.

=== Cardio area/exercise theatre ===
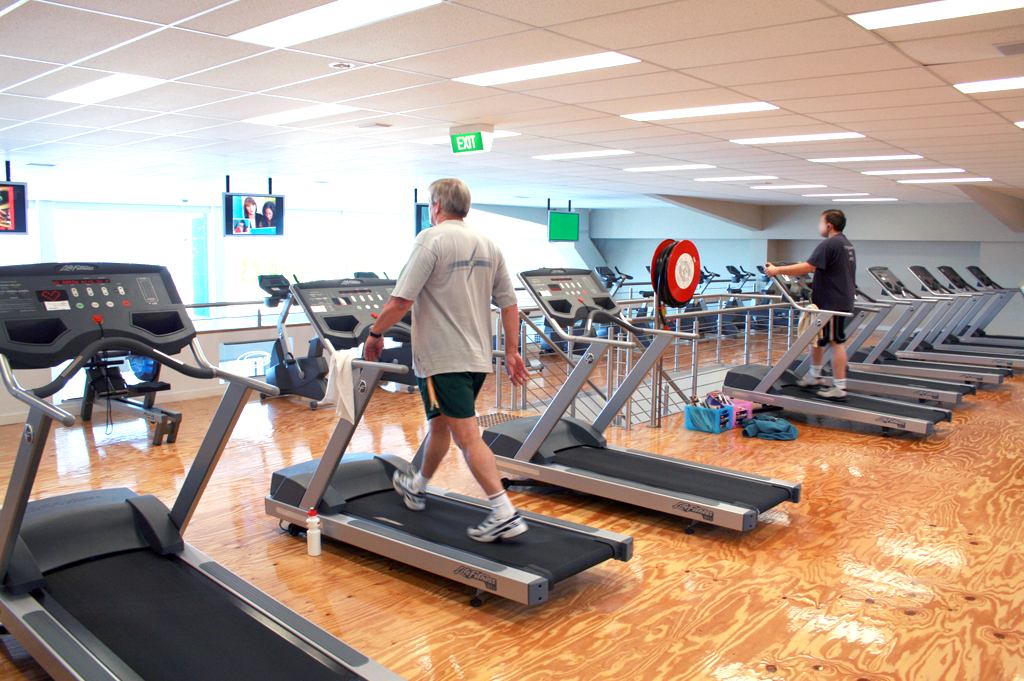
A cardio theatre including treadmills, stationary bikes and TV displays

A cardio theater or cardio area includes many types of cardiovascular training-related equipment such as rowing machines, stationary exercise bikes, elliptical trainers and treadmills. These areas often include a number of audio-visual displays, often TVs (either integrated into the equipment or placed on walls around the area itself) in order to keep exercisers entertained during long cardio workout sessions. Some gyms provide newspapers and magazines for users of the cardio theatre to read while working out.

=== Group exercise classes ===
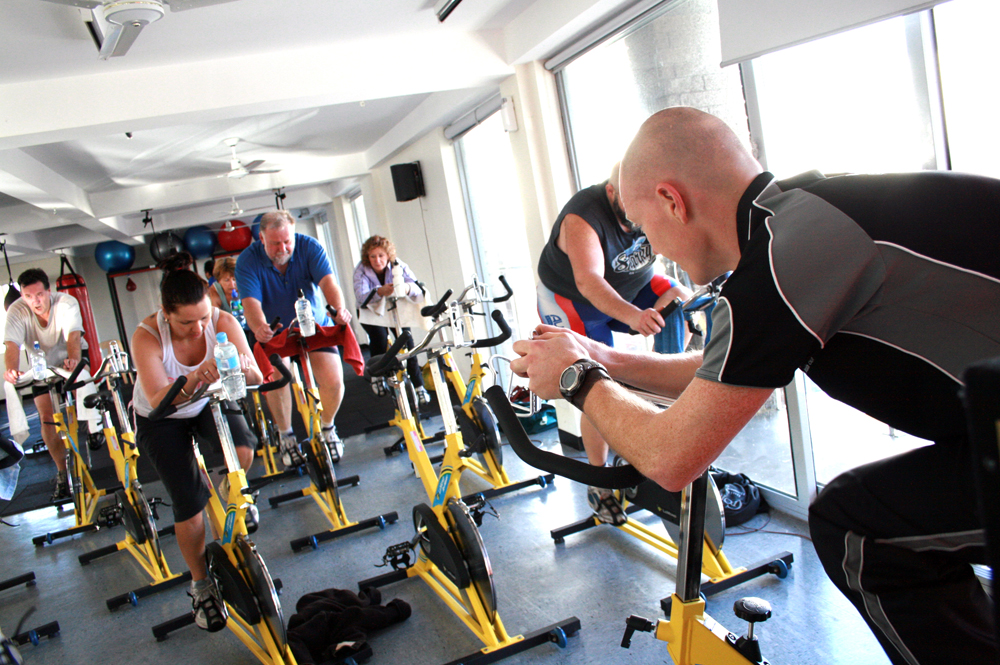
Spin-cycle group exercise class

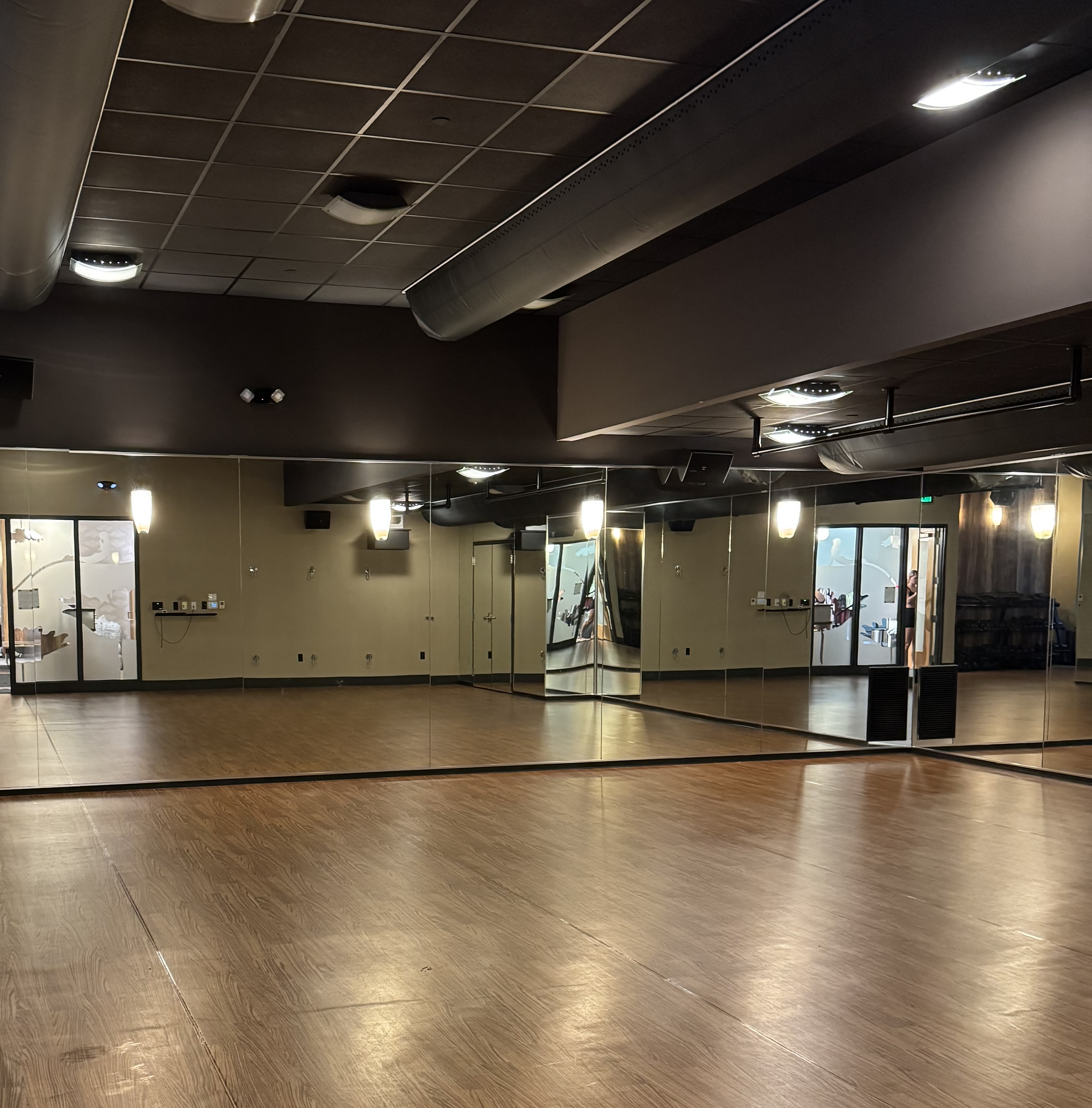
A yoga Studio in Boston, MA

Most 2010-era health clubs offer group exercise classes that are conducted by certified fitness instructors or trainers. Group exercise classes are often considered the most important service in the centers for members' engagement. Many types of group exercise classes exist, but generally these include classes based on aerobics, cycling (spinning), boxing or martial arts, high intensity training, step yoga, regular yoga and hot (Bikram) yoga, pilates, muscle training, stretching, and self-defense classes such as Krav Maga and Brazilian Jiu-Jitsu. Health clubs with swimming pools often offer aqua aerobics classes. The instructors often must gain certification in order to teach these classes and ensure participant safety.

=== Boutique fitness studios ===
Boutique fitness studios are workout studios designed to embrace the sense of a fitness community and an untraditional workout style, through specific machines, programs, utilities, and instructor styles. Unlike traditional gyms, these independent group classes are only enclosed to individuals with a membership or in a trial period. These studios have to keep up with global fitness trends and music hits in order to maintain their business and attract customers. Each boutique fitness studio offers something different based on current trends, such as intensity interval training (HIIT), strength training, dance, yoga, pilates, etc. These trends led to variations of classes and a mix of low-impact exercises with a focus on isometric exercise, cardio dance, and mind-body connection. Examples include heated yoga, reformer pilates, barre classes, etc.

=== Sports facilities ===
Some health clubs offer sports facilities such as swimming pools, squash and basketball courts, indoor running tracks, ice rinks, or boxing areas. In some cases, additional fees are charged for the use of these facilities.

=== Personal training ===
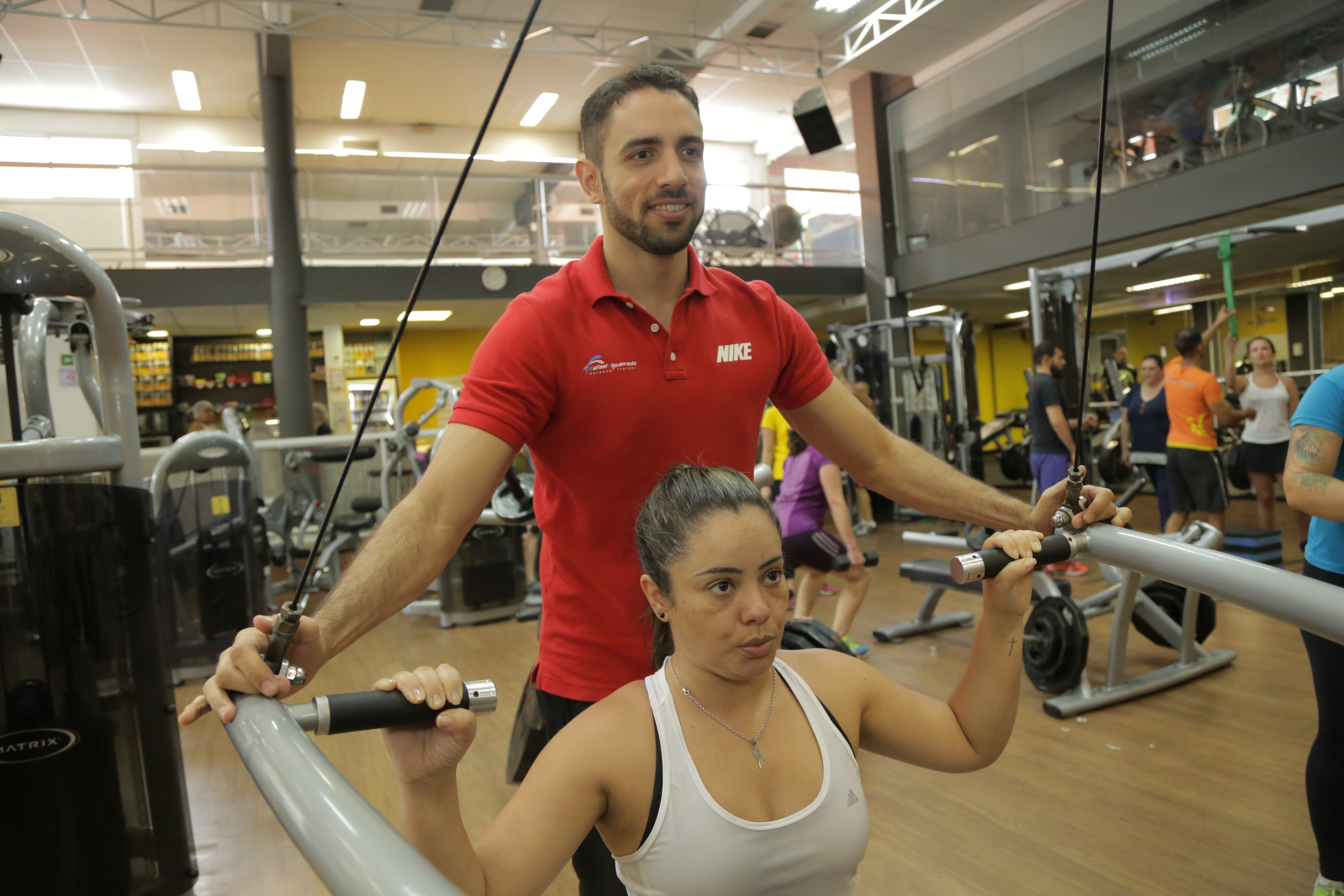
Personal training at a gym

Most health clubs employ personal trainers who are accessible to members for training/fitness/nutrition/health advice and consultation. Personal trainers can devise a customized fitness routine, sometimes including a nutrition plan, to help clients achieve their goals. They can also monitor and train with members. More often than not, access to personal trainers involves an additional hourly fee. Personal training workouts vary based on the desired goal, purpose and the structure of a workout. They may also be individual sessions, small group training or big group training. Depending on the location they can be online, virtual or hybrid.

=== Other services ===
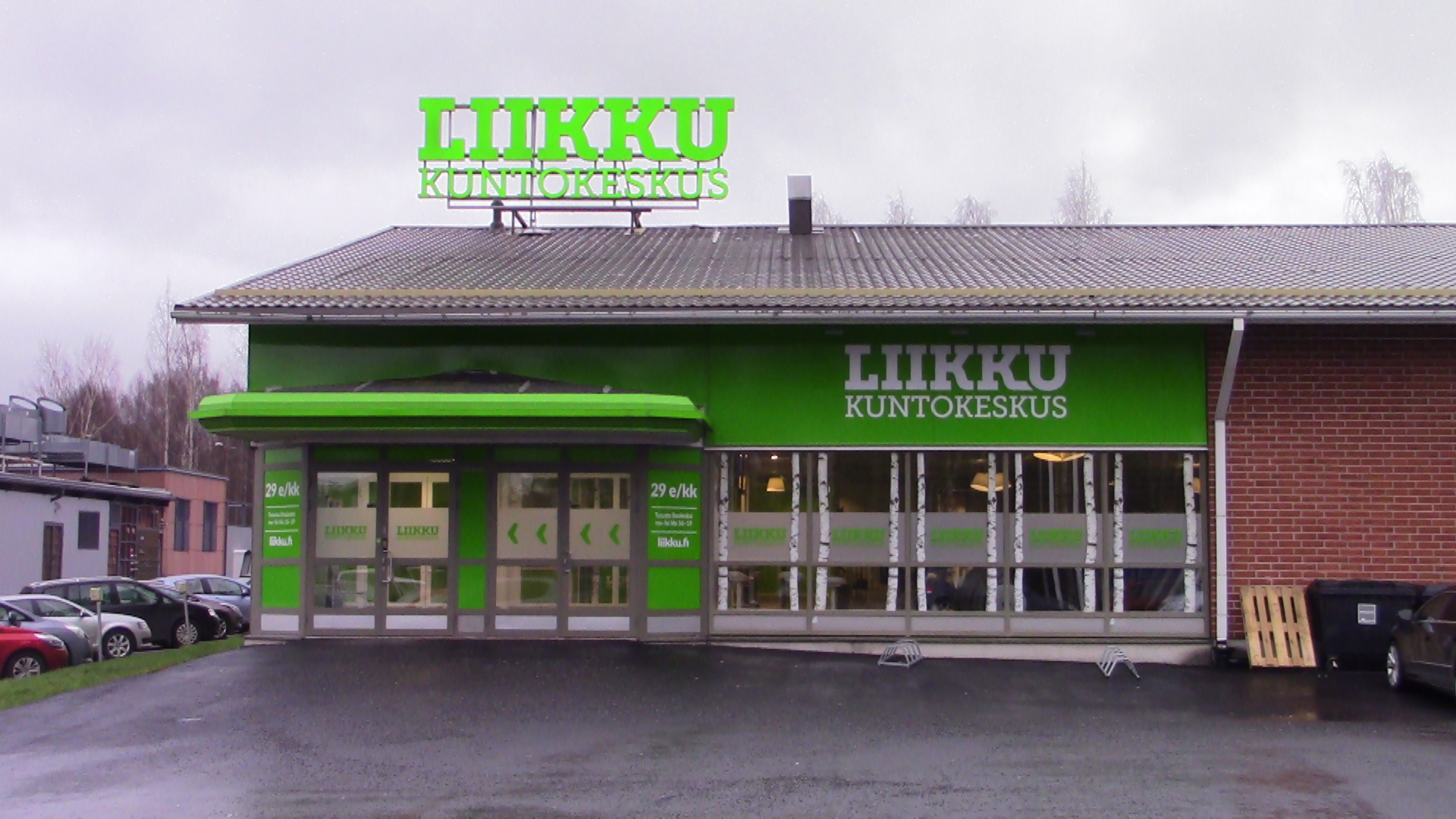
The Liikku gym chain in Pori, Finland

Newer health clubs generally include health-shops selling equipment, snack/protein bars and smoothies, restaurants, child-care facilities, member lounges and cafes. Some clubs have a sauna, steam room, or swimming pool and even nutrition counseling. Health clubs generally charge a fee to allow visitors to use the equipment, courses, and other provided services. In the 2010s, some health clubs became eco-friendly (e.g., zero waste) and incorporated principles of "green living" in their fitness regimen.

=== Levels of services and offerings ===
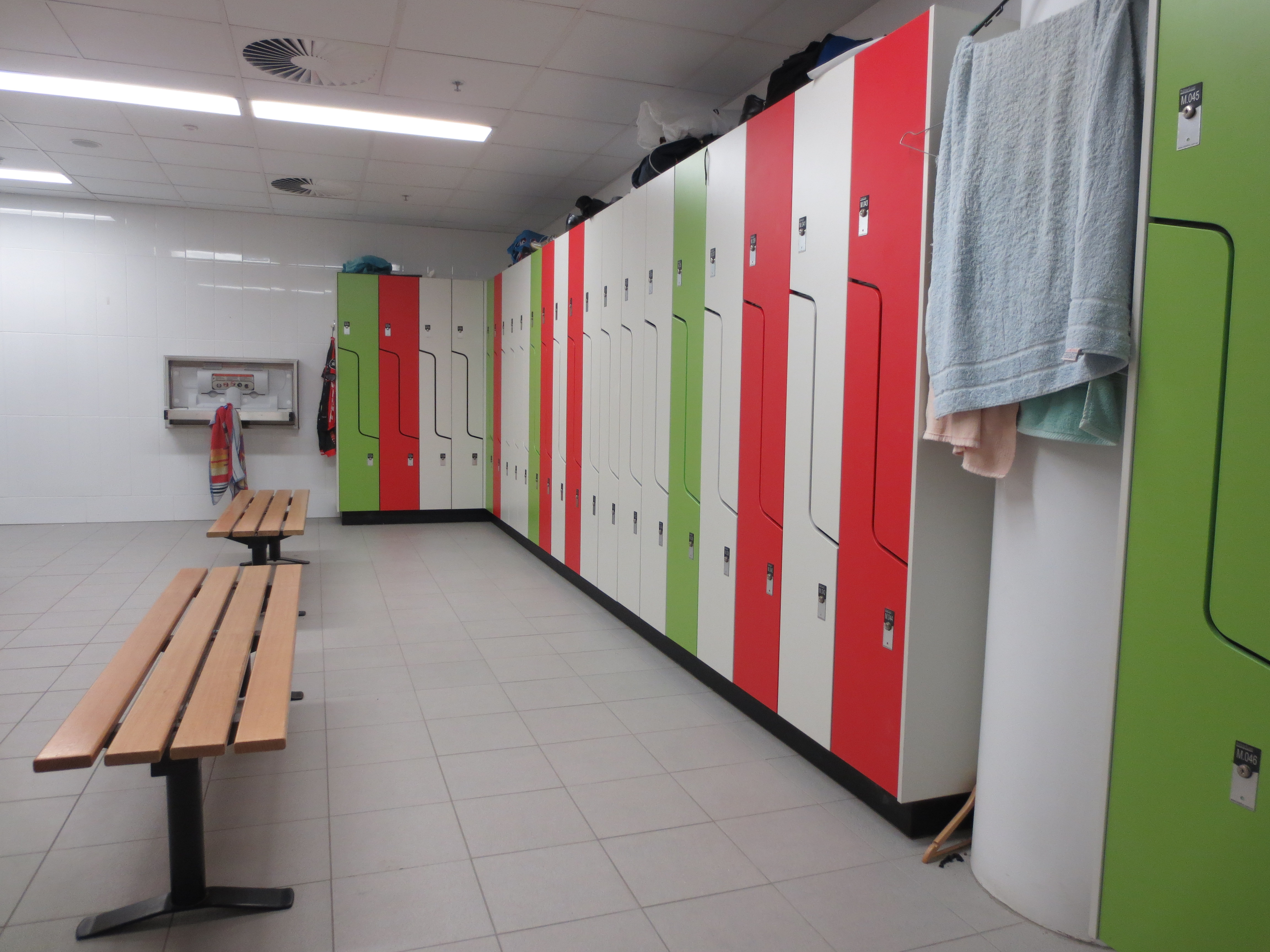
Change room showing lockers and seating

Health clubs offer many services and as a result, the monthly membership prices can vary greatly. A recent study of American clubs found that the monthly cost of membership ranged from US$15 per month at basic chain clubs that offer limited amenities to over US$200 per month at spa-oriented clubs that cater to families and to those seeking social activities in addition to a workout. In addition, some clubs - such as many local YMCAs and JCCs - offer per-use punch cards or one-time fees for those seeking to use the club on an as-needed basis. These one-time fees are commonly referred to as day passes.

Costs can vary through the purchase of a higher-level membership, such as a Founders or a Life membership. Such memberships often have a high up-front cost but a lower monthly rate, making them potentially beneficial to those who use the club frequently and hold their memberships for years.

=== Types of services in health clubs ===
Health clubs in North America offer a number of facilities and services with different price points for different levels of services. Some services have differently-priced levels or tiers, such as regular, pro, platinum and gold facilities or packages. Some of the health and fitness facilities use cardio equipment, fitness screening, resistance-building equipment, pro shops, artificial sun-beds, health spas and saunas. The membership plans vary from as low as $20 per month, for value-priced gyms to as high as $700 per month. These health clubs, especially in the United States, are equipped with a range of facilities and provide personal trainer support.

== History ==
In 1840, Hippolyte Triat, a French vaudevillian strongman, established the first commercial gymnasium in Brussels, in response to the growing interest for physical exercise. In 1847 he opened his Gymnase Triat in Paris, introducing membership fees with varying rates for men, women, and children. The first health clubs for the general public were probably opened in Santa Monica, California in 1947 by Vic Tanny. Inspired by European wellness centers and spas, the American Health Studios were founded in the 1950s by Ray Wilson and Bob Delmonteque. They were pioneers in bringing the full wellness experience to the gym with the inclusion of saunas, weight rooms, steam rooms, and other multifunctional amenities.

Since the 1970s, the health club market has expanded, along with the adoption of a fitness routine. From the postmodern era to metamodernism, fitness and physical activity have been shaped by and have in turn impacted societal changes, body ideals and trends, cultural shifts, and consumer culture.

== See also ==
- Athleisure
- Country club
- Gym
- Leisure centre
- Medspa
- Physical fitness
- Spa
