= Pasilalinic-sympathetic compass =

Pseudo-scientific communications device

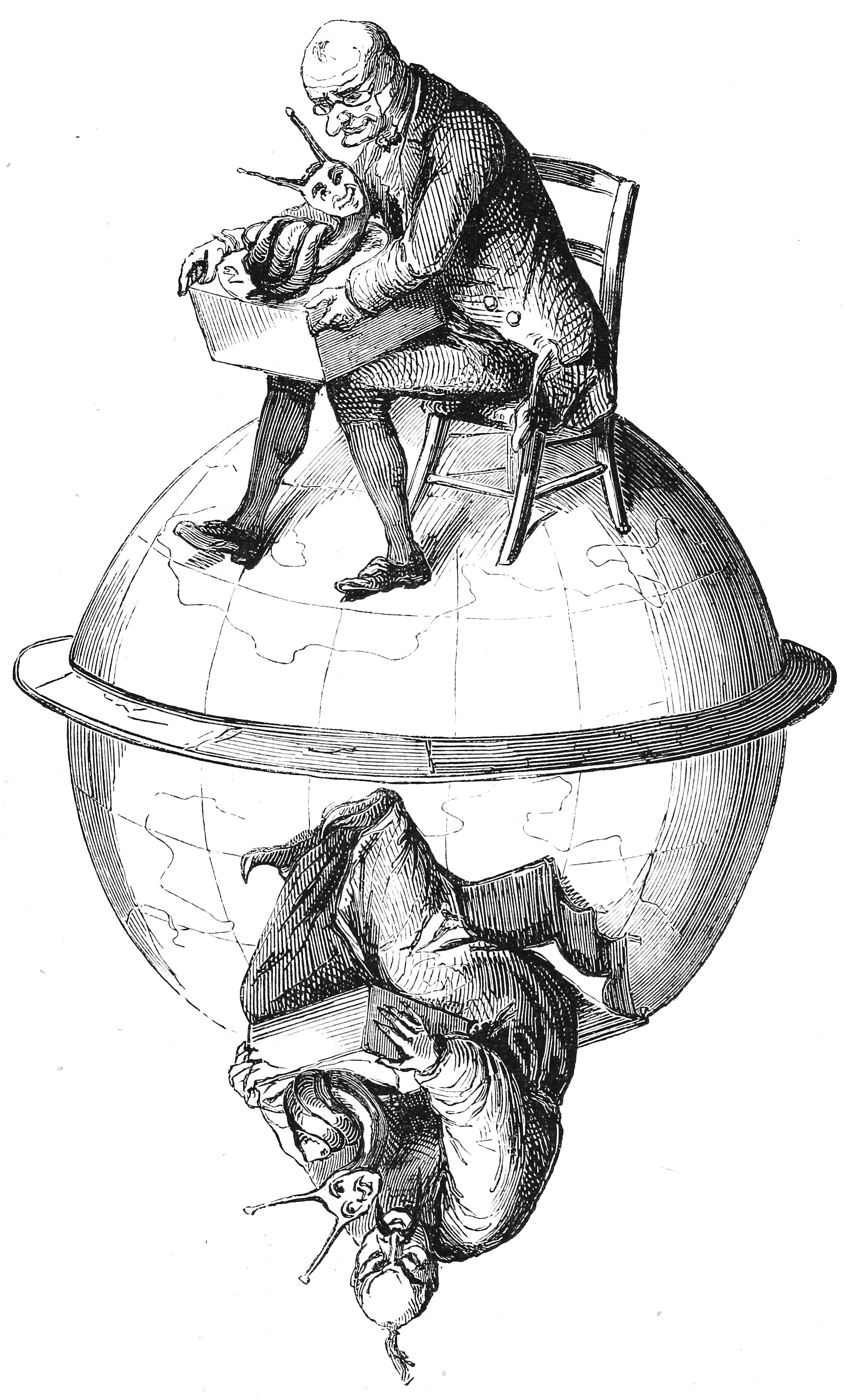
The compass in Dictionnaire Infernal, 1863.

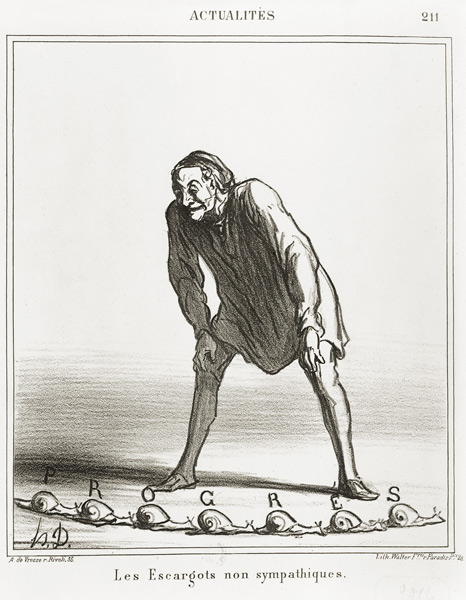
Cartoon by Honoré Daumier

The pasilalinic-sympathetic compass, also referred to as the snail telegraph, was a device built to test the hypothesis that snails create a permanent telepathic link when they mate. The device was developed by French occultist Jacques-Toussaint Benoît (de l'Hérault), with the supposed assistance of an American colleague, Monsieur Biat-Chrétien (Note: According to Dickens, no one ever saw Monsieur Biat, and it is undetermined whether he really existed.) in the 1850s.

== The hypothesis ==
Benoit claimed that when snails mate, an etheric escargotic fluid forms a permanent telepathic link between them. This fluid forms an invisible thread that keeps the snails in "sympathetic communication" by using animal magnetism similar to an electric current pulsating along it. They claimed that this method would work instantly, wirelessly, over any distance, and be more reliable than a telegraph.

This was not the first attempt to create a form of sympathetic communication. There are stories of Rosicrucians cutting pieces off the flesh of their arm and transplanting it with another person, with the alphabet tattooed on the flesh. By using a magnetized needle to prick the letters they wished to communicate, telepathy would be achieved. It was upon these stories that Benoit built his theory. William Brooke O'Shaughnessy is one prominent telegrapher who experimented with using human skin to send and receive messages.

== The apparatus ==
Benoit did not have enough financial capital to build his design. Benoit persuaded Monsieur Triat, manager of a Paris gymnasium, to give him lodgings and an allowance, having impressed upon him the importance of his discovery. After a year Triat's patience grew thin, and he demanded to see a working model.

The apparatus consisted of a scaffold of 10-foot-long wooden beams supporting zinc bowls lined with a cloth soaked in a copper sulphate solution; the cloth was held in place by a line of copper. At the bottom of each of the 24 basins was a snail, glued in place, and each associated with a different letter of the alphabet. An identical second device held the paired snails. To transmit a letter, the operator touched one of the snails. This was supposed to cause a reaction in the corresponding snail, which could then be read by the receiving operator.

== Demonstration ==
On 2 October 1850 Benoit invited Triat and friend Jules Allix, a journalist from La Presse. He first asked Triat and then Allix to stand at one station and to spell out a word – he would then tell them what the word was by reading from the receiving end. However, the transmission was inaccurate, with him supposedly receiving errors such as “gymoate” instead of “gymnase”, and he continually walked between the two devices, claiming that it was necessary to supervise his assistants to ensure that they were touching and reading the snails correctly. Triat began to suspect that it was a hoax. Allix, however, was convinced by the demonstration and wrote an article full of praise for Benoit's creation, which appeared in La Presse on 25 and 26 of October 1850. Among other praise, Allix suggested that ladies might wear the device on their "waist-chains". Triat demanded a second, stricter test, to which Benoit agreed. When the time came, though, Benoit had vanished. He was subsequently seen wandering the streets of Paris and died at the beginning of the year 1852.

== Influence ==
During the 1871 uprising in the Paris Commune, the need to send and receive secured messages prompted a revival of the idea by Marquis Rochefort, president of the barricades commission. However, it proved to be as unreliable then as it had originally been.

The device also provided inspiration for the Japanese manga series One Piece, which includes Den Den Mushi 'transponder snails' that function as telephones, fax machines, and surveillance cameras. Along with the Allix article in La Presse the story of the pasilalinic-sympathetic compass was covered by the 1889 book Historic Oddities and Strange Events by Sabine Baring-Gould.

== See also ==
- Sympathetic alphabet
