= Thérèse-Mirza Allix =

French painter

- Born: September 16, 1816; Fontenay-le-Comte, Vendée, France
- Died: September 16, 1882 (aged 66); Poitiers, Vienne or Germany (conflicting accounts)
- Occupation(s): School founder, painter
- Family: Augustine Allix (sister); Jules Allix (brother)

Thérèse-Mirza Allix, sometimes Mirza Allix, (September 16, 1816 – September 16, 1882) was a French painter of portraits, known for her miniature paintings on enamel, porcelain and earthenware.

Along with her sisters, she founded a boarding school for girls in her hometown of Fontenay-le-Comte.

== Early life and education ==
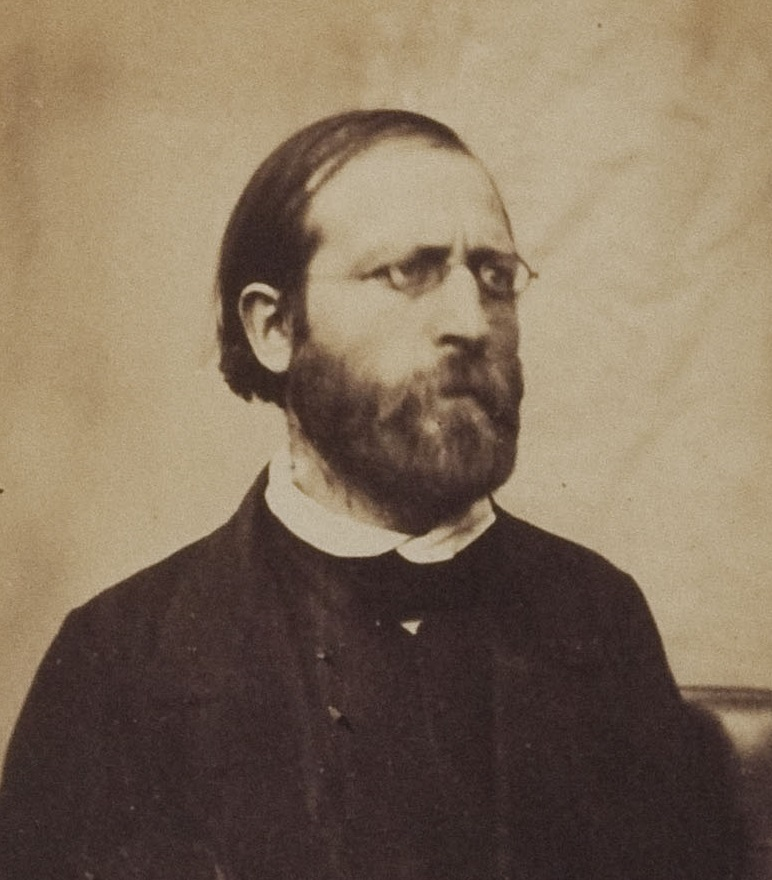
Brother Jules Allix, c. 1854

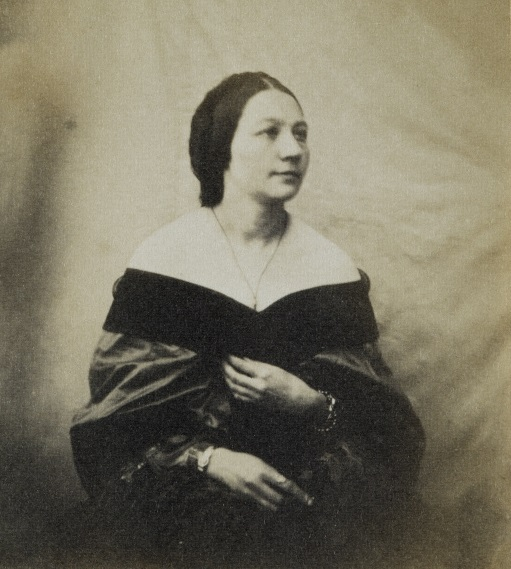
Sister Augustine, c. 1852

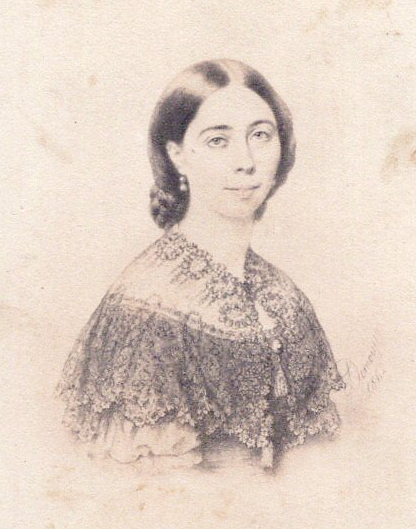
Sister Eudoxie, 1864

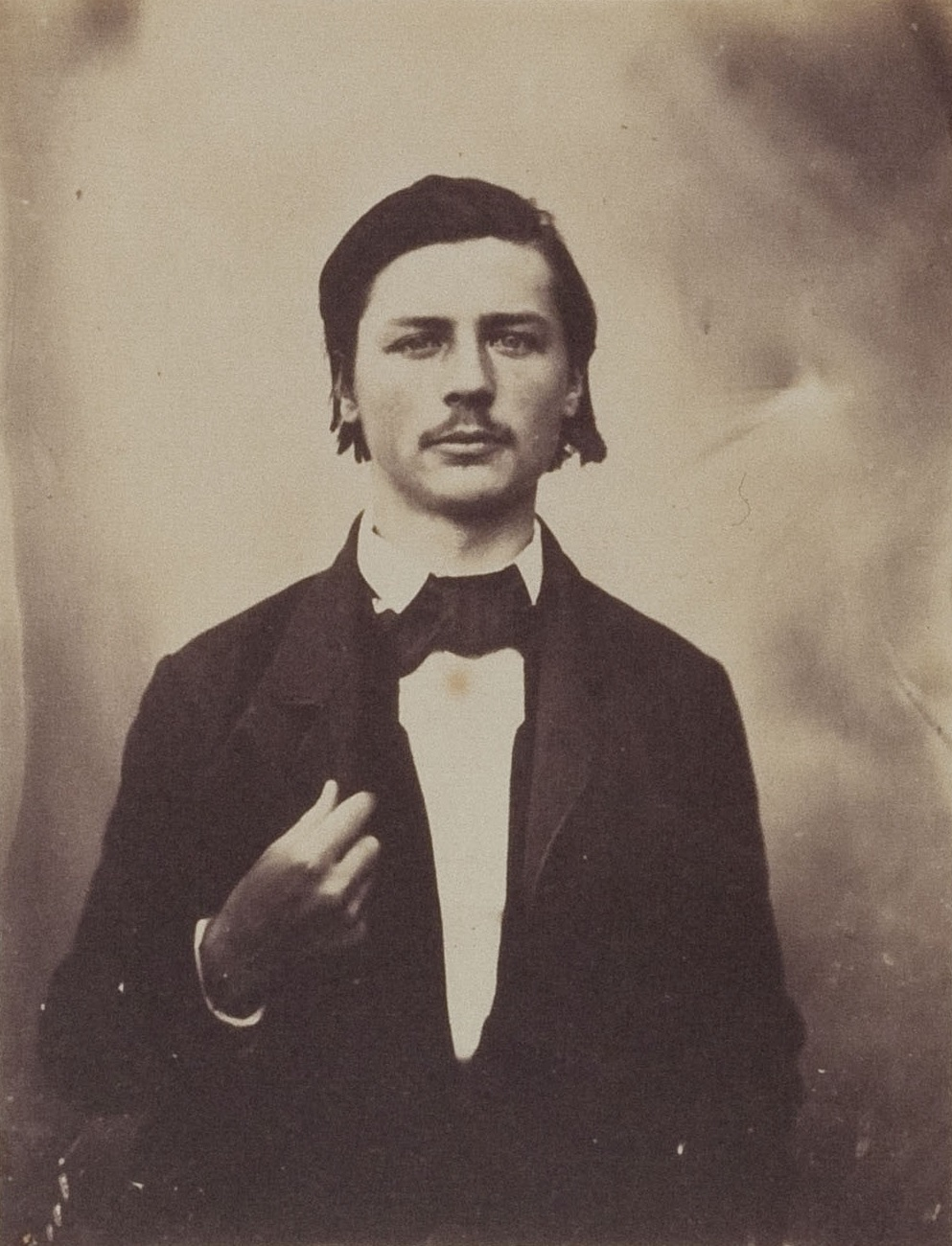
Brother Émile, 1855

Allix was born on September 16, 1816, at Fontenay-le-Comte, Vendée, France to parents Pierre-François Allix and Gabrielle-Thérèse Vexiau. She was the sister of Augustine Allix (born 1823), Jules Allix (born 1818), Émile Allix (born 1836), Bathilde Allix, Eudoxie Allix-Dubruel and Céline.

She studied with Charles de Steuben and Gustave Wappers.

== Career ==
With her sisters, she ran an institution for young girls in Fontenay-le-Comte from 1842 to 1847. The Allix sisters' boarding school then moved to Paris in 1847.

Allix is known for her miniature portraits in porcelain, and enamel. She exhibited her fantasy portraits and copies of portraits by old masters at the Salon de Paris in 1877 and 1882. She is also known for her ceramics. In the 1877 salon she exhibited a work depicting Mary Stuart based on a work from the 16th century. Her portrait of her great-uncle, Abbé Garnereau, was acquired by the Museum of Fontenay-le-Compte in 1945 and is held in the museum's collection.

== Death ==
While French archives record that she was pronounced dead after arriving on a train from Paris to Poitiers, Vienne on September 16, 1882, the Orsay Museum website states that she died in Germany.
