= Château de Terre-Neuve =

Castle of Terre Neuve
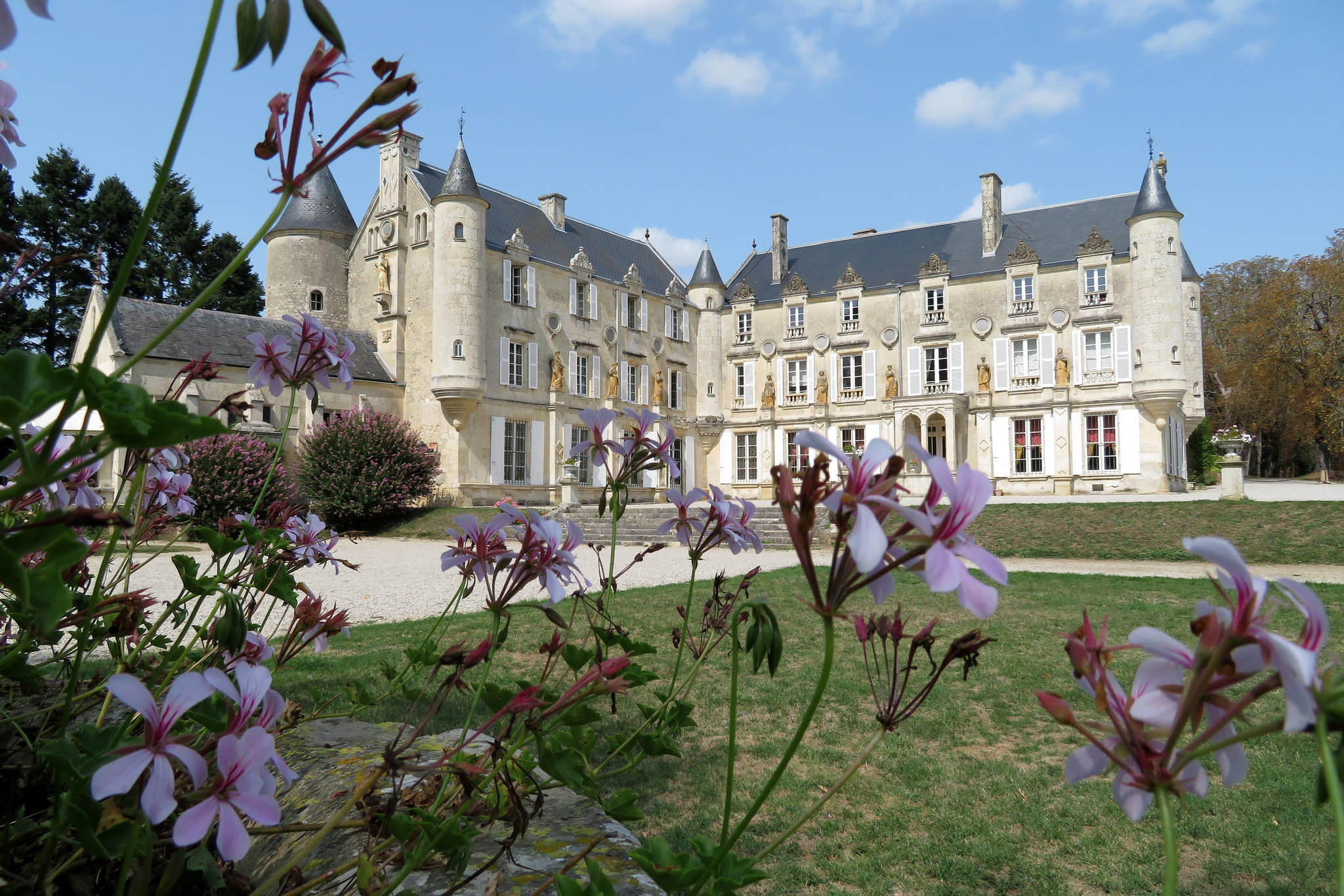
- Interactive map of the Castle of Terre Neuve area

General information
- Type: Castle
- Architectural style: Renaissance
- Location: Fontenay-le-Comte, France
- Coordinates: 46.4628°N 0.8147°W
- Construction started: 1584
- Owner: Vicomte du Fontenioux

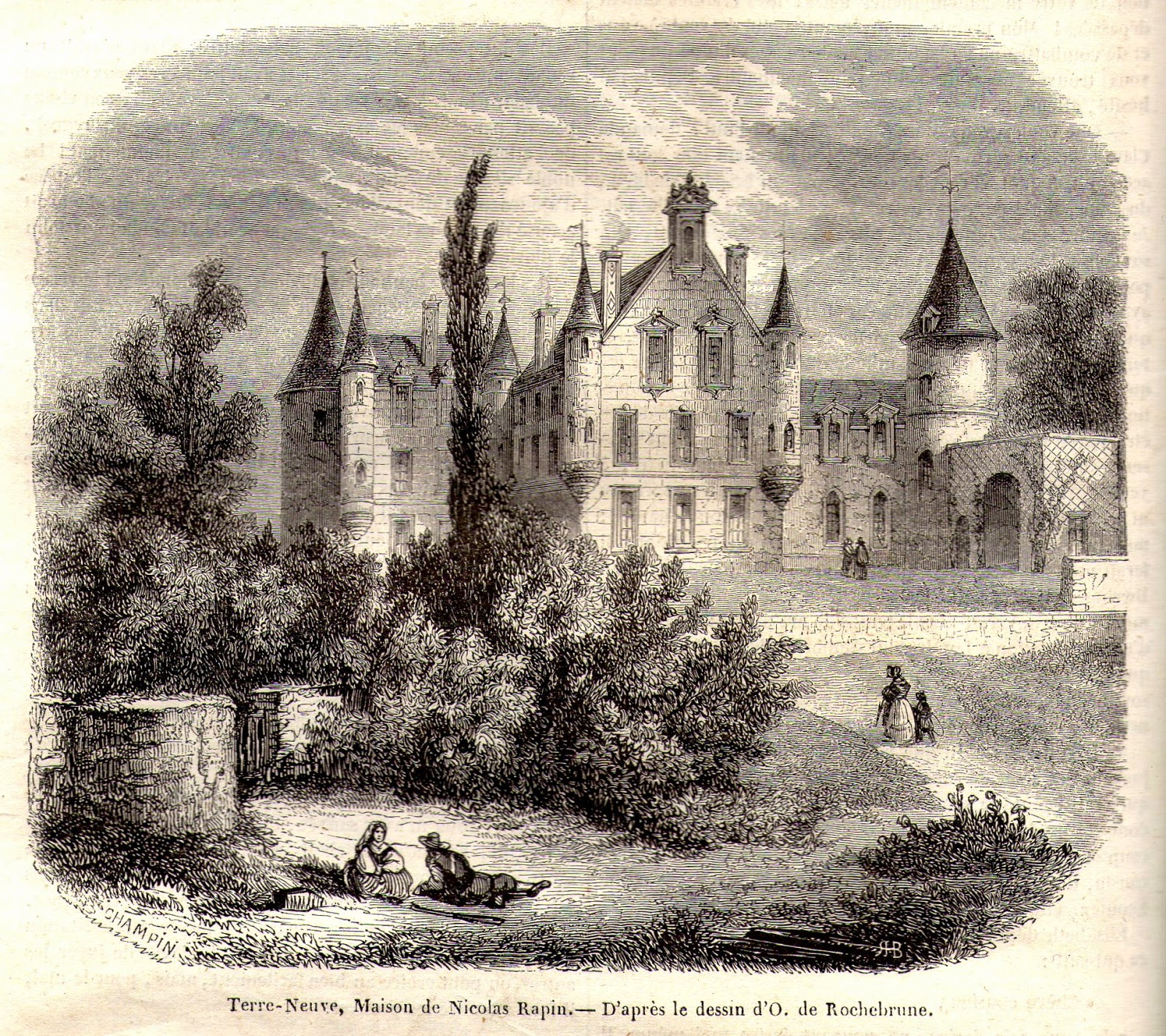

The Castle of Terre Neuve is an historic château in Fontenay-le-Comte, Vendée, Pays de la Loire, France. It has been listed as an official historical monument by the French Ministry of Culture since 1978. The Castle of Terre Neuve was built in the 1580s and 1590s for Nicolas Rapin.

== The origins ==
On a plateau opposite of the historic center of Fontenay-le-Comte Nicolas Rapin bought a farm in 1584. Former mayor of the city, chased by Protestants in 1569, Nicolas Rapin is known for his military career, but also as a poet and a lawyer. Although having fought against the Huguenots, Rapin co-signed the Satire Ménippée, a work supporting the accession of Henri IV to power against the Catholic League. Ennobled in 1590 (the Satire Ménippée circulated from 1593), Nicolas Rapin built his castle around 1594.

Close to royal power and humanist circles, Nicolas Rapin welcomed some renowned guests in Terre-Neuve such as Agrippa d'Aubigné or the Duke of Sully (prime minister for Henri IV). In 1691 the Rapin family is ruined, the castle is sold several times before being purchased by a congregation of Vincentian priests around 1701. Moved here to evangelize the region, they still occupied the house during the Revolution period.

== Octave de Rochebrune, the great 19th century owner ==
Born in Terre-Neuve in 1824, Octave de Rochebrune is the grandson of Claude Tendron de Vassé who bought the château in 1805. Student at Stanislas College in Paris, he later entered the studio of the painter and lithographer Justin Ouvrié known for his depictions of monuments and cities. Returning to Fontenay-le-Comte in 1848, Octave de Rochebrune marries Alix Grelier du Fougeroux whose grandfather took part in the Vendée war as a vendean lieutenant (his sword is exposed in the château). Little by little, Octave de Rochebrune indulges in the technique of etching.

Gradually, he learned how to engrave, work the copper plates, handle the acid technique. In his workshop at Terre-Neuve, the majors French monuments such as Chambord castle, the Louvre museum or monument of Vendée as the church of Vouvant will come out of the press. Engraver, erudite and art lover (he was a friend of artists including the painter Paul Baudry), Octave de Rochebrune had a brief political career. Close to legitimist circles, he held the office of mayor of Fontenay-le-Comte three times between 1868 and 1878. He died in Fontenay in 1900 and is buried in Notre-Dame cemetery near his wife who died in 1872. He leaves behind him an important collection, including 492 engraved brass.

== External items ==
During the 19th century, Octave de Rochebrune want to preserve some heritage against destruction (stone career at Coulonges-sur-l'Autise, woodwork burned in Chambord during the War of 1870...).

The set-up of the different items and furniture's collected outside of Terre-Neuve represent the architectural ideal of Octave de Rochebrune. Most of the Renaissance elements added by Rochebrune comes from the castle of Coulonges-sur-l'Autize (formerly Coulonges-les-Royaux) : Porch, coffers, door frame in the dining room, vaults of the workshop, fireplace in the main living room. The castle of Coulonges was partly in ruin prior to the Revolution. Rochebrune's approach was similar when he restored and installed the fireplace from the seneschal house of Fontenay-le-Comte, in the dining room.

Thanks to its proximity with the Count of Chambord, Henri d'Artois, Octave de Rochebrune received two doors from François Ier era and thirteen suns from the room of Louis XIV in Chambord. These elements are integrated into the door of the dining room, the woodwork of the main living room... It is also from the Château de Chambord that comes another decoration reassembled in the main living room: the forestage pediment of the first performance of the Bourgeois Gentilhomme by Molière in 1670. This theater decor was designed by Louis XIV's engineer, Carlo Vigarani.

== Gallery ==
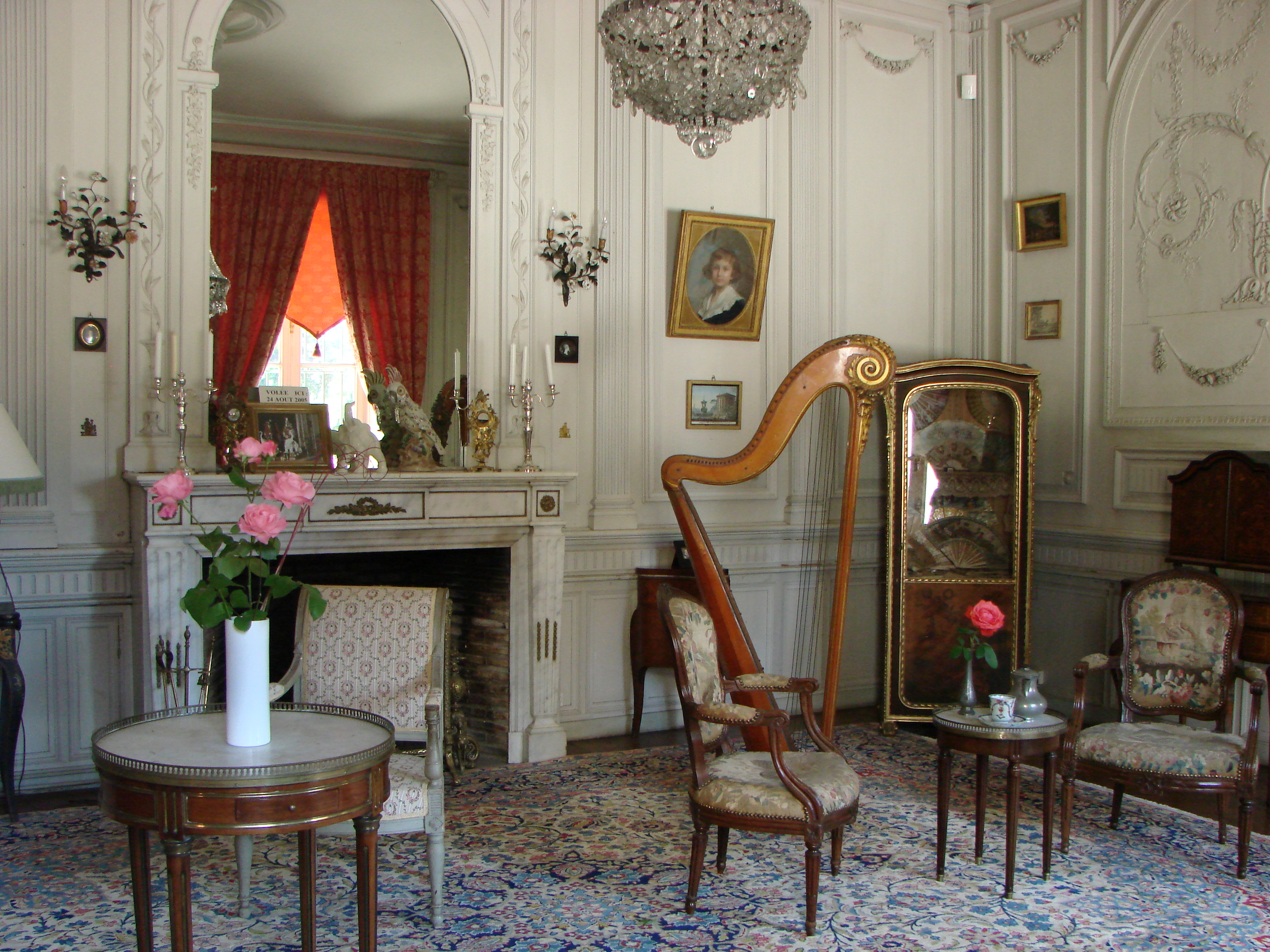
Small living-room.

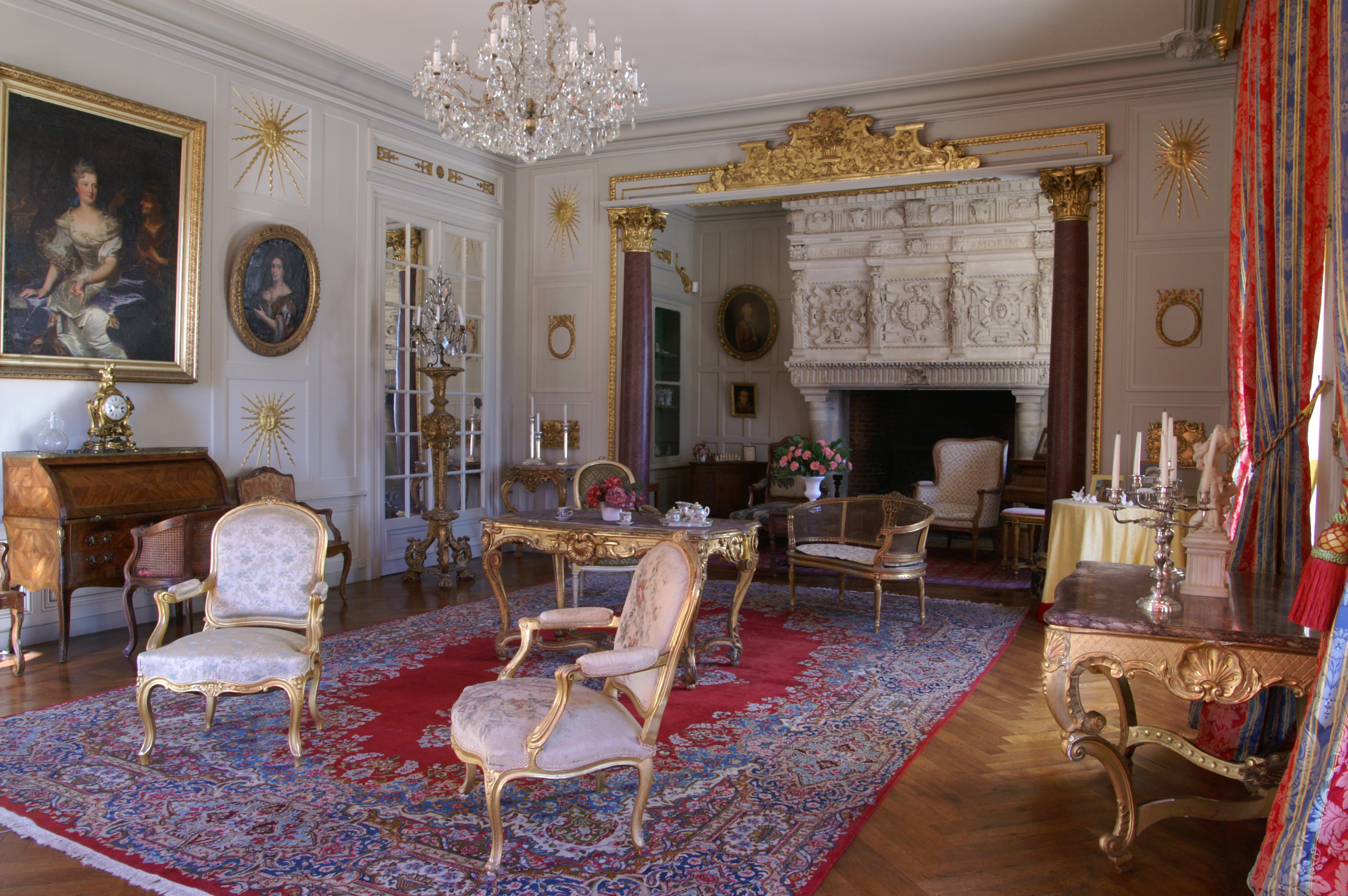
Large living-room.

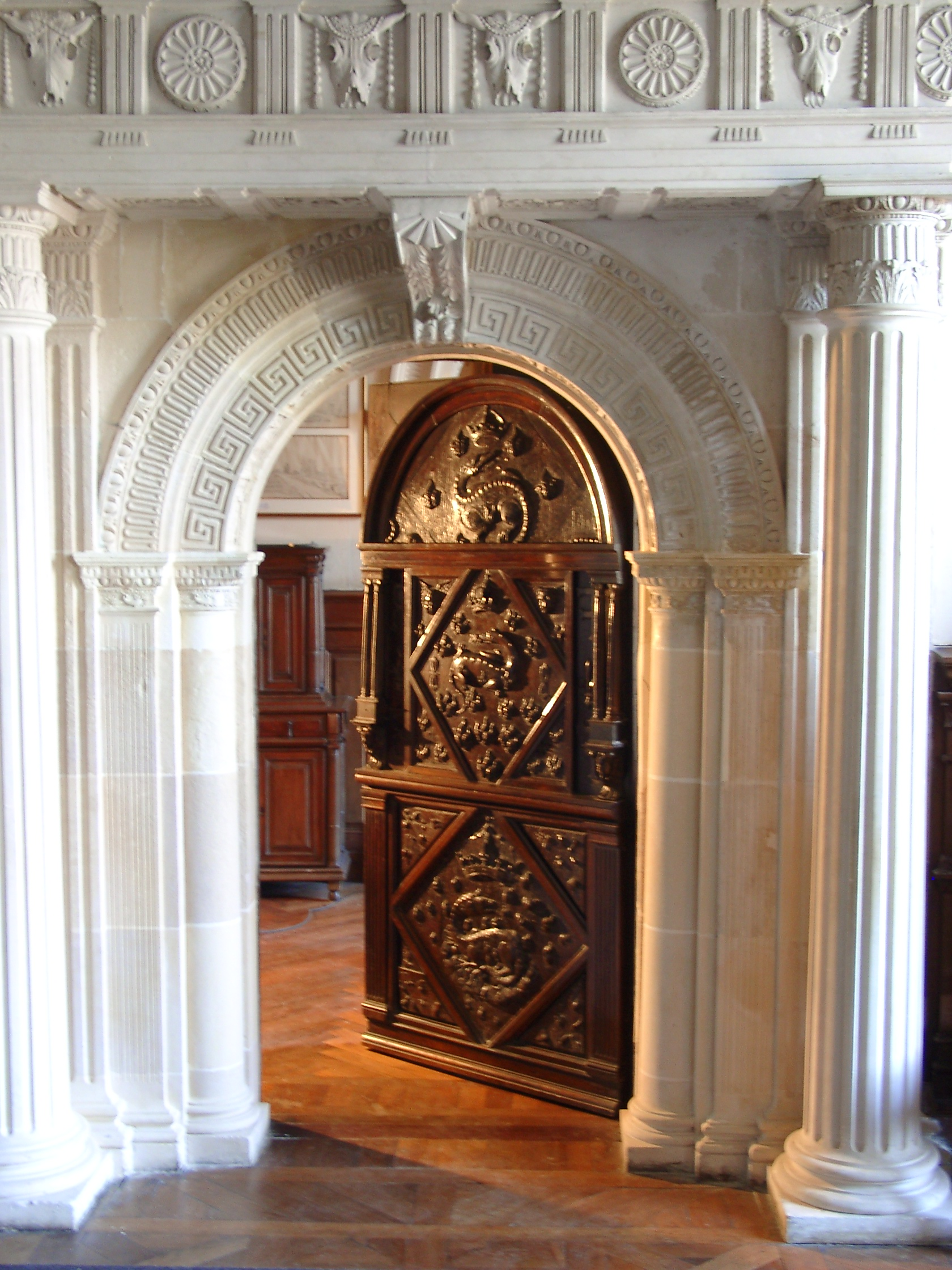
Dining-room door.

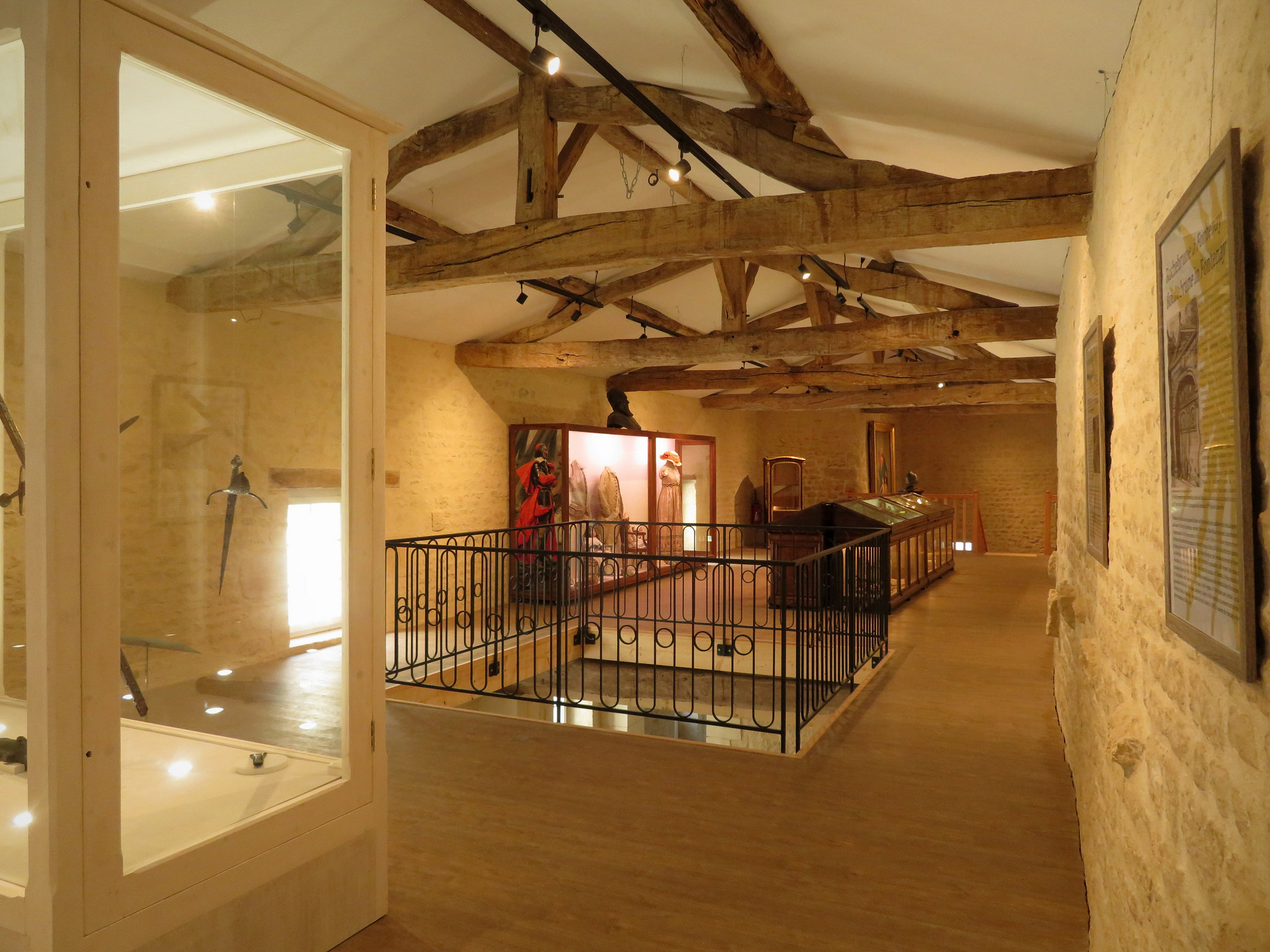
A part of the Château's museum.
