= Jules Allix =

Communard and inventor (1818–1903)

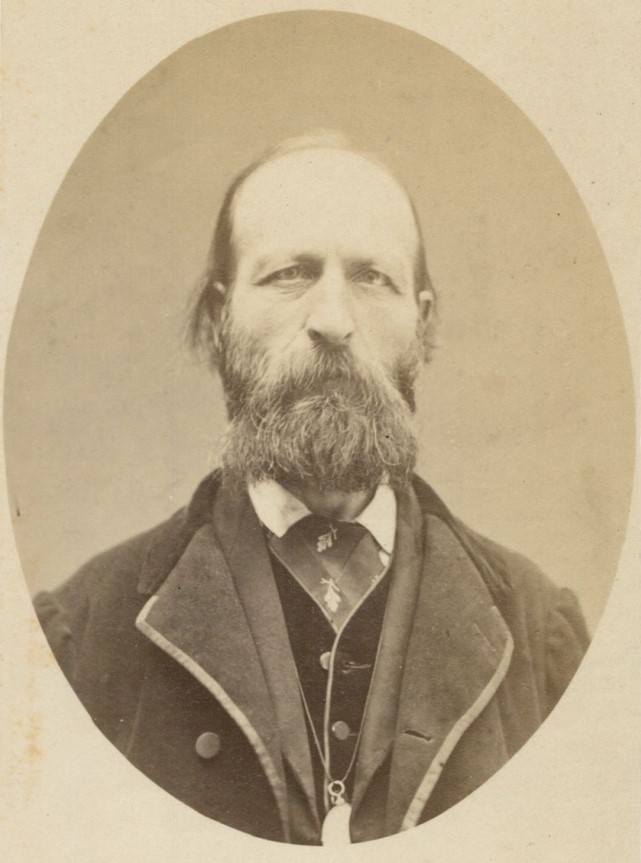

Mayor of the 8th arrondissement of Paris
- In office 26 March – 9 May 1871

Personal details
- Born: 9 September 1818
- Died: 1 September 1903 (aged 84)
- Occupation: activist and inventor

Jules Allix (9 September 1818 – 1 September 1903) was a French feminist, socialist, political activist and eccentric inventor. A communard, he was mayor of the 8th arrondissement of Paris.

== Political activism ==
In the Commune he inspired the creation of the "Comité des Femmes de la Rue d'Arras", which held a non-communist socialist view that emphasized the rights of women. The significance of the group is a matter of dispute, but it seems to have failed at several of its goals.

== Inventions and experiments ==
Jules Allix is also known for his connection to several inventions and experiments deemed unusual. One of these being the "snail telegraph" (see pasilalinic-sympathetic compass). The idea behind it stated that snails, once put in contact, remain in sympathetic communication. Therefore, snails could be used to send messages through this communication. During the Franco-Prussian War, he suggested that women be armed with tubes of prussic acid, with which to kill the attacking Prussians.
