= Stedman =

Stedman may refer to:

- Stedman (name)
- Stedman, North Carolina
- Stedman's Medical Dictionary
- Stedman Machine Company
- Battle of Fort Stedman
- Stedman barb, a species of cyprinid fish native to India and Bangladesh
- Stedman v United Kingdom, 1997 UK labour law case
- Stedmans V&S, Canadian department store
- Stedman, a popular method in Change ringing

== See also ==
- Steadman (disambiguation)
- Steedman (disambiguation)
