= Sd.Kfz. 10 =

leichter Zugkraftwagen 1t, Sd.Kfz. 10
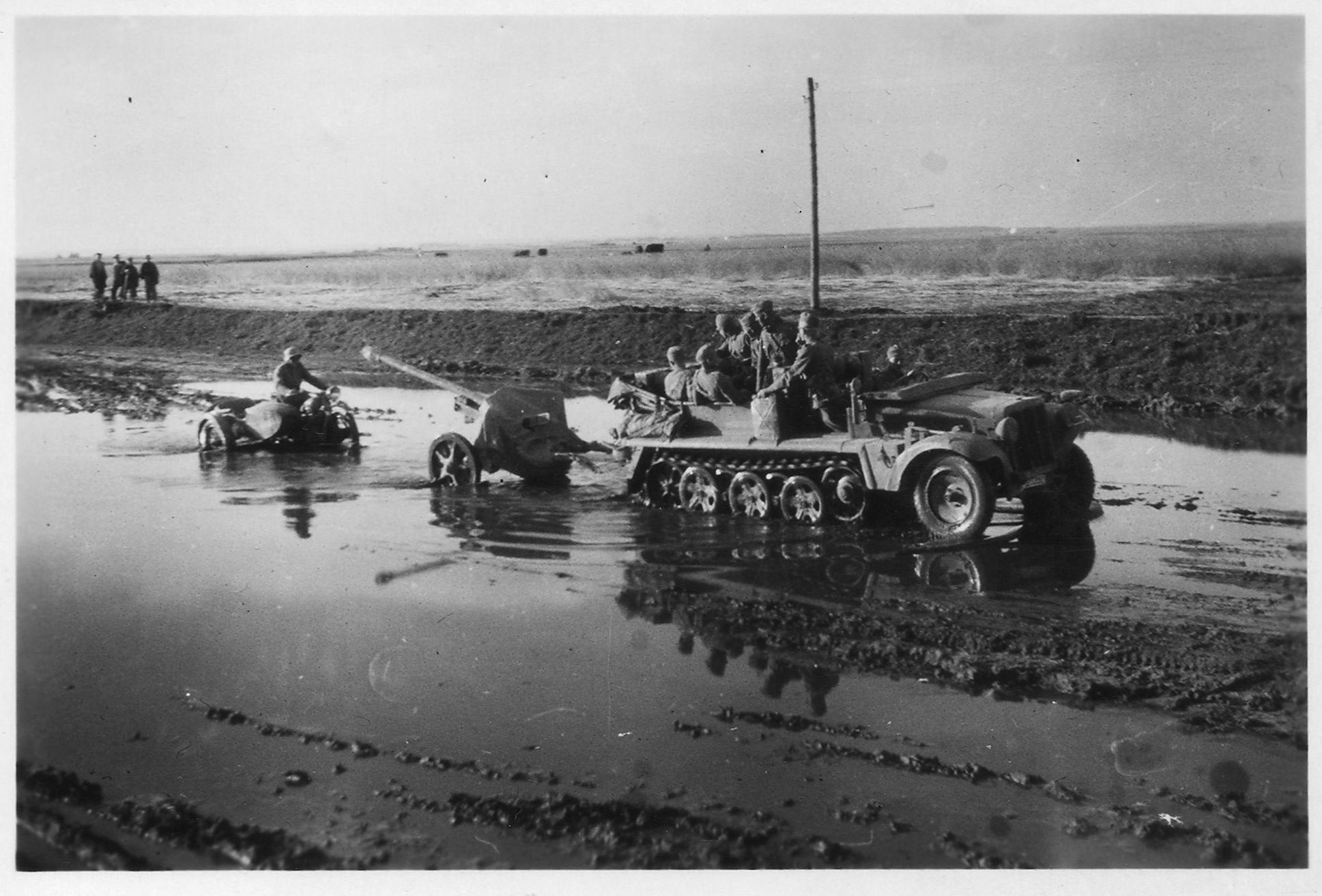
- Sd.Kfz 10 halftrack towing a 7.5 cm Pak 40 anti-tank gun through mud
- Type: Light half-track
- Place of origin: Nazi Germany

Service history
- In service: 1938–1945
- Used by: Nazi Germany; Romania; Sweden
- Wars: World War II

Production history
- Designer: Demag
- Designed: 1934–1938
- Manufacturer: Demag, Adler-Werke, Büssing-NAG, MWC, MNH, MIAG, Saurerwerke
- Unit cost: 15000 Reichsmark
- Produced: 1938–1945
- No. built: Approx. 14,000
- Variants: Sd.Kfz. 10/1 to 10/5

Specifications (Sd.Kfz. 10 Ausf. B)
- Mass: 3,400 kilograms (7,500 lb)
- Length: 4.75 metres (15.6 ft)
- Width: 1.93 metres (6.3 ft)
- Height: 2 metres (6.6 ft) (overall)
- Crew: 2 + 6
- Engine: 4.2L Maybach HL42 TRKM petrol 6-cylinder, water-cooled 100 metric horsepower (99 hp)
- Power/weight: 29.1 HP/ton
- Transmission: 7 + 3 speed Maybach Variorex SRG 102128H
- Suspension: torsion bar
- Ground clearance: 32 centimetres (13 in)
- Fuel capacity: 110 litres (29 US gal)
- Operational range: 300 kilometres (190 mi) (road); 150 kilometres (93 mi) (cross-country)
- Maximum speed: 65 km/h (40 mph) (road)

The Sd.Kfz. 10 (Sonderkraftfahrzeug – special motorized vehicle) was a German half-track that saw widespread use in World War II. Its main role was as a prime mover for small towed guns, such as the 2 cm Flak 30, the 7.5 cm leIG, or the 3.7 cm Pak 36 anti-tank gun. It could carry eight troops in addition to towing a gun or trailer.

The basic engineering for all the German half-tracks was developed during the Weimar-era by the Reichswehr's Military Automotive Department, but final design and testing was farmed out to commercial firms with the understanding that production would be shared with multiple companies. Demag was chosen to develop the smallest of the German half-tracks and spent the years between 1934 and 1938 perfecting the design through a series of prototypes.

The chassis formed the basis for the Sd.Kfz. 250 light armored personnel carrier. Approximately 14,000 were produced between 1938 and 1945, making it one of the most widely produced German tactical vehicles of the war. It participated in the Invasion of Poland, the Battle of France, the Balkans Campaign and fought on both the Western Front and the Eastern Front, in North Africa and in Italy.

== Description ==
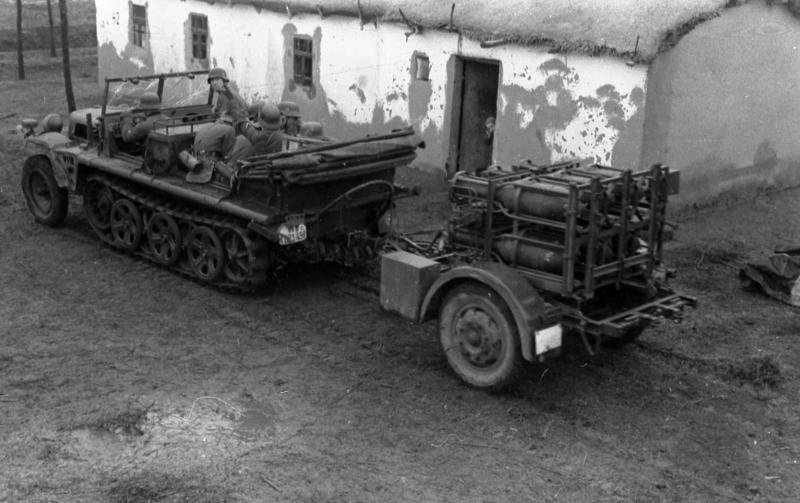
A Sd.Kfz 10/1 gas detection vehicle towing a 28/32 cm Nebelwerfer 41 rocket launcher

The Sd.Kfz. 10 was unique among German half-track designs as it used a hull rather than a frame. Power was at first provided by a military version of a Maybach 6-cylinder water-cooled gasoline engine. It had a semi-automatic Maybach Variorex-transmission SRG 102128H (Schaltreglergetriebe 102 128 H) with seven forward and three reverse gears. The driver selected the desired gear and initiated the shift by depressing the clutch. It could attain 65 km/h (40 mph), while the cruising speed was 45 km/h (28 mph). In 1942 the Luftwaffe limited its vehicles to a non-tactical speed of only 30 km/h (19 mph) to extend the life of the rubber track pads (Gummipolster).

Both tracks and wheels were used for steering. The steering system was set up so that gentle turns used just the steerable front wheels, but brakes would be applied to the tracks the farther the steering wheel was turned. The drive sprocket had the track-saving but more complicated rollers rather than the more common teeth. The rear suspension consisted of five double roadwheels, overlapping and interleaved in the Schachtellaufwerk layout, mounted on swing arms sprung by torsion bars. An idler wheel, mounted at the rear of the vehicle, was used to control track tension. The front axle had transversely mounted leaf springs and shock absorbers – the only ones on the vehicle.

The upper body had a baggage compartment separating the driver's compartment from the crew compartment. Bench seats on the sides of the vehicle, with under-seat storage, could accommodate six men. The windshield could fold forward and was also removable. A convertible canvas top was mounted at the upper part of the rear body. It fastened to the windshield when erected. Four side pieces could be mounted to protect the crew from the weather.

== Design and development ==
Preliminary design of all the German half-tracks of the early part of the war was done by Dipl.Ing. Ernst Kniepkamp of the Military Automotive Department (Wa Prüf 6) before the Nazis took power in 1933. His designs were then turned over to commercial firms for development and testing. Demag was assigned to develop the "Liliput" Kleinster geländegängiger Kettenschlepper (smallest cross-country tracked towing vehicle) with the first D ll 1 prototype produced in 1934. It had a six-cylinder, 28 horsepower (28 PS) BMW Type 315 engine mounted in the rear and only had three roadwheels per side. The D ll 2 followed in 1935 and kept the same engine, but added an extra roadwheel. It weighed 2.56 tonnes (2.52 long tons; 2.82 short tons).

While the first two vehicles were only automotive prototypes, the 3.4 tonnes (3.3 long tons; 3.7 short tons) D ll 3 had a 42 horsepower (43 PS) BMW Type 316 engine mounted in the front, 5 roadwheels and a troop compartment that could fit six. The D 4 prototype never left the drawing board. There was no D 5. It was succeeded by eight trial series (Versuchs-Serie) D 6 prototypes in 1937. This weighed 3.85 tonnes (3.79 long tons; 4.24 short tons), had a 90 metric horsepower (89 hp) Maybach NL 38 TRK engine and a different transmission, but otherwise differed only in detail from the D ll 3. Several D 6s and the D ll 3 were used as prototypes for the models intended for service with the Chemical Troops (Nebeltruppen) and the Air Defense Troops (Luftschutztruppen). A series of 60 pre-production (0-serie) D 6s were ordered in 1937 from Demag, Adler and Mechanische Werke Cottbus (MWC) which differed only in details from the trial series. They were all delivered by November 1938. On 17 March 1937 the vehicle was renamed as the leichter Zugkraftwagen 1 to (Sd.Kfz. 10) (light 1 ton semi-tracked towing vehicle).

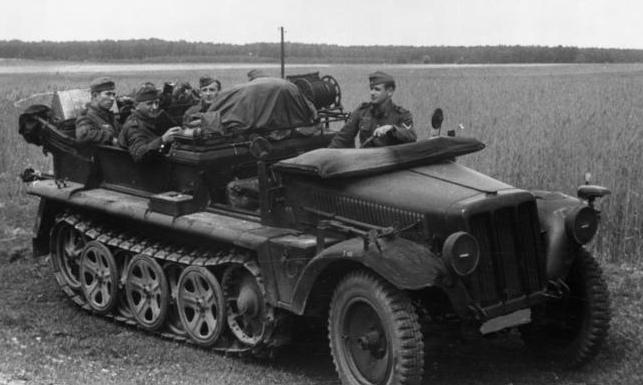
A Sd.Kfz. 10/1

The D 7 was the mass-production model and differed mainly from the D 6 by having different tracks and a Maybach NL 38 TRKM engine. The NL 38 TRK had proven to have too much compression for the 74 octane (OZ 74) gasoline decreed for use after 1 October 1938, and had to be modified with a new cylinder head and shorter pistons, but this did not change the engine's power. Deliveries began in October 1938 with one of the first machines off the production line demonstrated for the army on 11 October 1938. Early machines had two fuel tanks: one of 58 litres (15 US gal) and the other of 32 litres (8.5 US gal), but they were replaced by a single 110 litres (29 US gal) at the end of 1939. Also the NL 38 TRKM engine was replaced in late 1939 by the HL 42 TRKM, for which the stroke had been increased to 110 mm, thereby increasing the displacement from 3.8 litres (230 cu in) to 4.2 litres (260 cu in) and the power from 90 metric horsepower (89 hp) to 100 metric horsepower (99 hp). From the beginning of 1940, stronger road wheels came into use, and during 1940 the hull rear was reinforced to allow the vehicle to tow heavier loads like the 7.5 cm PaK 40 anti-tank gun, 15 cm sIG 33 infantry gun and the 10.5 cm leFH 18 howitzer. An air compressor was added later for loads equipped with air brakes. These were designated as Model (Ausführung - Ausf.) B. In 1943 the semi-automatic transmission was replaced by a manual transmission.

The D 7p chassis for the Sd.Kfz. 250 light armored personnel carrier was based on that of the D 7 with a shortened suspension.

Demag was contracted to design a new version of the Sd.Kfz. 10 in 1944 with ten road wheels, a strengthened front axle, a strengthened idler crank arm, an improved track tensioner and increased ground clearance. Three prototypes were completed; two were delivered in September 1944, but the third was retained at the factory. Development, however, did not proceed any further. Yet another new version of the Sd.Kfz. 10 was proposed in the Emergency Development Program (Entwicklungs-Notprogramm) of 20 February 1945 with armored engine and driver's compartments that was to have had its development completed in June 1945.

== Production ==
Seven factories assembled the various models of the Sd.Kfz. 10. Demag built approximately 1,075 from 1938 to November 1942. Adler-Werke completed 3,414 between 1938 and December 1943. Büssing-NAG built 750 between 1938 and December 1942. MWC assembled 4,750 between 1939 and November 1944. Mühlenbau und Industrie A.G. (MIAG) completed 324 between 1939 and 1941. Maschinenfabrik Niedersachsen Hannover (MNH) built about 600 between 1939 and November 1942. Österreichische Saurerwerke completed about 3,075 from 1940 to December 1943. Both Demag and MWC were producing the D 7p chassis for the Sd.Kfz. 250 light APC in 1945 when a shortage of armored bodies meant that 276 had to be completed with wooden upper bodies. Eighty of these are known to have been delivered by 1 March 1945. These numbers may include 310 chassis built for Sd.Kfz. 252 armored ammunition carriers and Sd.Kfz. 253 observation vehicles.

== Variants ==
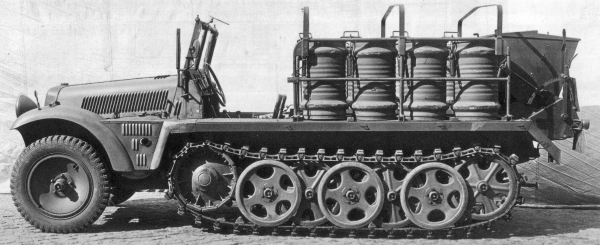
A Sd.Kfz. 10/2

=== Sd.Kfz. 10/1 ===
The Sd.Kfz. 10/1 was a chemical detection vehicle. Before the outbreak of World War II only ninety were intended to be delivered in 1940–42 to equip the Chemical Troops (Nebeltruppen), but the 3 May 1940 production plan mentions that was to be produced at a rate of thirty per month until 400 have been built and thereafter at ten per month. The last mention is a report that MWC was to complete ten vehicles by 15 January 1943. Production may have continued after that, but definitely not after 1943.

=== Sd.Kfz. 10/2 ===
The Sd.Kfz. 10/2 was a chemical decontamination vehicle fitted with a 200 kg (440 lb) capacity spreader and space for eight 50 kg (110 lb) barrels of decontamination chemicals. This left room for only two crewmen, who had a bench seat between the barrels in front of the rear chassis wall. Each barrel could cover an area of 1 by 160 metres (1.1 by 175.0 yd). The barrels were stowed on platforms over the tracks with foldable outer rails. The 10/2 had a significant number of differences from the standard model, including two fuel tanks totaling 86 litres (23 US gal), one of which had a tunnel to accommodate the auxiliary driveshaft which powered the spreader. This reduced the road range to only 250 kilometres (160 mi). The 10/2 was 4.83 metres (15.8 ft) long, 1.9 metres (6.2 ft) wide, and 1.95–1.7 metres (6.4–5.6 ft) high, depending if the top was up or down. It weighed 3,890 kilograms (8,580 lb) empty and 4,900 kilograms (10,800 lb) loaded. While spreading, its top speed was only 10–20 km/h (6.2–12.4 mph). Sixty to seventy were built in 1938–39.

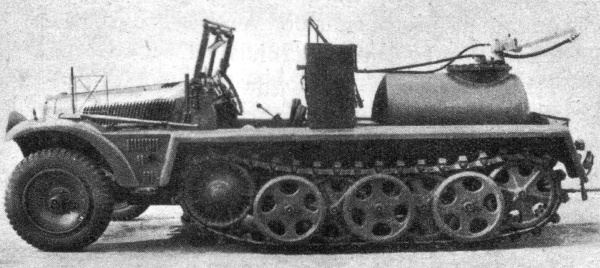
A Sd.Kfz. 10/3

=== Sd.Kfz. 10/3 ===
The Sd.Kfz. 10/3 was equipped with a 500 litres (130 US gal) tank and spray system to lay down poison gas barriers. The spray nozzle swung back and forth to cover a width of 16 metres (52 ft). Approximately 67 were built in 1938–39. On 15 April 1942, the Army High Command (Oberkommando des Heeres – OKH) ordered the tanks on the 65 vehicles in storage dismounted, the spray system disabled and the vehicles modified to carry 216 rounds of anti-tank ammunition. The vehicles were to be issued to rebuilding Nebeltruppen units. By this stage of the war, they were equipped with Nebelwerfer rocket launchers and had organic anti-tank guns.

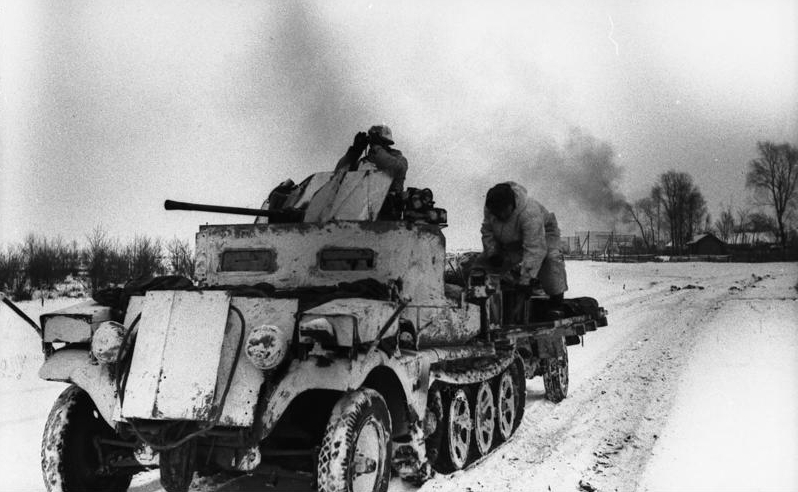
A Sd.Kfz. 10/4 or 10/5 with Behelfspanzerung

=== Sd.Kfz. 10/4 and 10/5 ===
The Sd.Kfz. 10/4 carried the 2 cm FlaK 30 mount on a special platform with fold-down side and rear panels. This platform was specifically designed for the Flak 30 mount and could not readily accept a Flak 38 mount or vice versa. To accommodate the gun mount the vehicle was both wider and taller than normal, namely 2.02 metres (6.6 ft) wide and 2 metres (6.6 ft) and weighed 4,075 kilograms (8,984 lb) empty. Four folding seats were fitted on the platform for the crew. Some of these gun mounts had a gun shield fitted. The ready ammunition bins fastened to the side and rear panels (four on each side and two in the rear) contained one 20-round magazine each. It usually towed an ammunition trailer (Sd.Ah. 51 - Sonderanhänger—special single-axle trailer) with 640 more rounds, the gun's sights and its rangefinder.

Vehicles built in 1940 (only) were fitted with removable loading ramps, cable rollers to act as pulleys, and a reinforced tail gate to allow a Flak 30, mounted on a Sd.Ah. 51 trailer, to be quickly dismounted. From 1940 they were fitted with rifle racks over the front fenders and from 1942 these were given sheet metal covers as protection from the weather. Flak 38s were mounted on 10/4s beginning in 1941 although the platform was not widened until later. As the war progressed the guns were more often fitted with gun shields.

The Sd.Kfz. 10/5 carried the 2 cm FlaK 38 whose mount was wider, and lighter, than that of the Flak 30, and the platform was enlarged to accommodate it from 1942. Vehicle width increased to 2.156 metres (7.07 ft), but the height returned to that of the normal vehicle. Initially, vehicles modified with the wider platform for the Flak 38 did not have a special designation, but they were given one sometime in 1943. The earliest known use is 1 September 1943, but the older name lingered until 1 December 1944. The Luftwaffe ordered 293 sets of armor plate (Behelfspanzerung) for its vehicles in 1943. These plates covered the radiator, windshield and both sides of the driver's compartment and were fitted to both versions.

Production began in 1939 for deliveries to the Army and Luftwaffe, although the exact numbers will never be known as they were often not broken out separately in the production reports. At any rate, Adler built 1054 between 1939 and February 1943, although some of these were completed as 10/5s beginning in 1942. MWC was awarded two contracts for 975 10/5s to be delivered in 1943–44, but 13 of these were delivered as ordinary Sd.Kfz. 10s in 1944.

=== Field modifications ===
Some vehicles were fitted with a 3.7 cm PaK 36 or 5 cm PaK 38 anti-tank gun. Sometimes they had the cab and engine compartment armored as well. The Pak 36 was usually carried complete, but the Pak 38 was usually mounted without its wheels on a pivot mount. At the end of the war, some vehicles were equipped with a triple-mount ("Drilling" in German) of MG151 autocannon on a conical pivot. It was the same mount as was used in Sd.Kfz. 251/21.

== Deployment and use ==
Initially, it was planned to use the Sd.Kfz. 10 as a towing vehicle for various light guns and trailers, but it was authorized as a substitute for the Sd.Kfz. 250 light armored personnel carrier in 1939. The Ausf. B model saw its use broadened to tow heavier weapons like the 5 cm PaK 38 as well as their ammunition trailers. They also served in the maintenance and supply companies of motorized and tank units. Nine were delivered to Romania in 1942 as tractors for anti-tank guns.

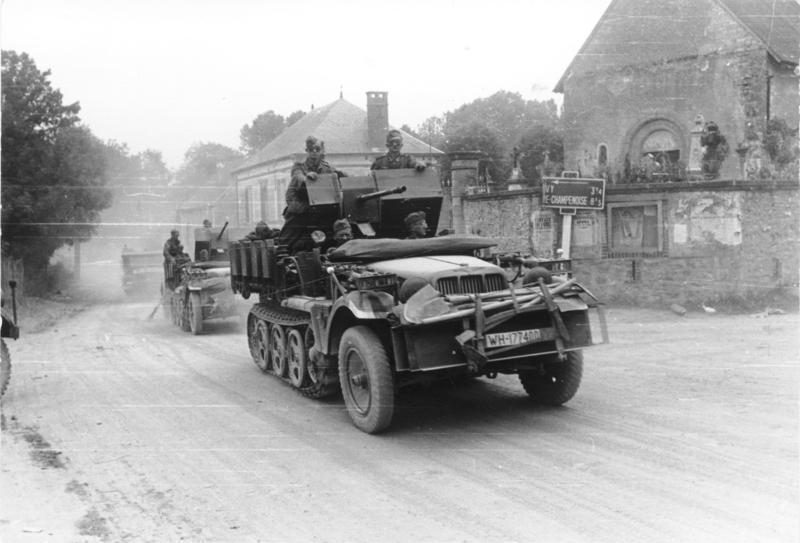
A Sd.Kfz. 10/4.

For the Chemical Troops (Nebeltruppen) each decontamination battery (Entgiftungs-Batterie) was authorized six Sd.Kfz. 10/1 and six Sd.Kfz. 10/2. Eighteen Sd.Kfz. 10/3 were held at the battalion level for issue to the batteries in lieu of their Sd.Kfz. 10/2s if needed. If necessary they could be substituted for Sd.Kfz. 11s of the appropriate type. When the decontamination units were authorized to be re-equipped with heavy rocket launchers in November 1941, seven Sd.Kfz. 10/1s were used to tow the 28/32 cm Nebelwerfer 41 launchers and another was used by the platoon leader to tow an anti-tank gun. Similarly, decontamination units usually retained their Sd.Kfz. 10/2s and used them just like the 10/1s after removing their special equipment. However, it seems that the 10/3s were turned in when the unit was reorganized.

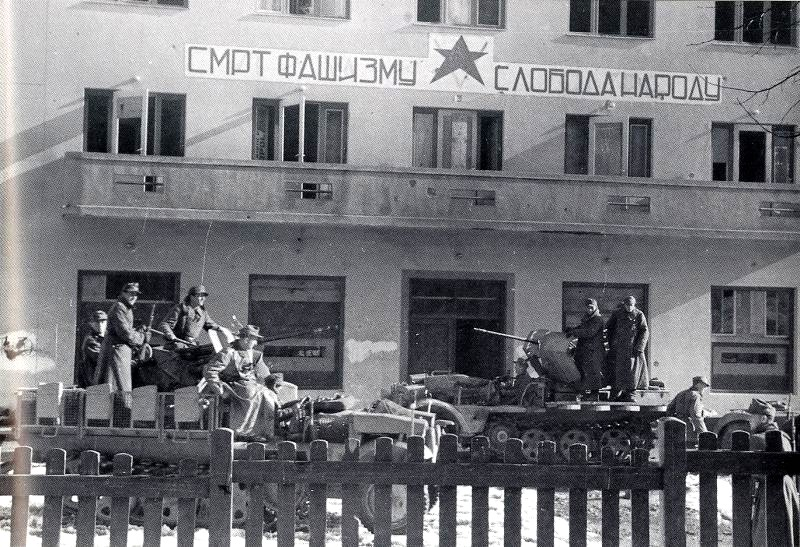
German troops of the 1. Gebirgs-Division mounting Flak-armed Sd.Kfz. 10s in front of a former partisan HQ in Tuzla after the city's capture, shortly before Operation Kugelblitz in Yugoslavia.

An early-war Army anti-aircraft company (Flugabwehr-Kompanie) was organized in three platoons with a total of eighteen Sd.Kfz. 10/4s, twelve with guns and six carrying ammunition. When the four-barrel 2 cm Flakvierling 38 was fielded in 1941, each platoon had four Sd.Kfz. 10/4s towing the guns and another for ammunition. Later, these companies were reorganized with a total of eight Sd.Kfz. 10/4s carrying guns, two towing Flakvierlings and three carrying ammunition. These are just examples of some of the Army organizationsm which differed depending on the unit and the period. Sd.Kfz. 10/5s were substituted for 10/4s on a one for one basis. Detailed records do not survive for the Luftwaffe light anti-aircraft units, but they appear to have been organized into batteries of nine or twelve guns.

=== Usage in Sweden ===
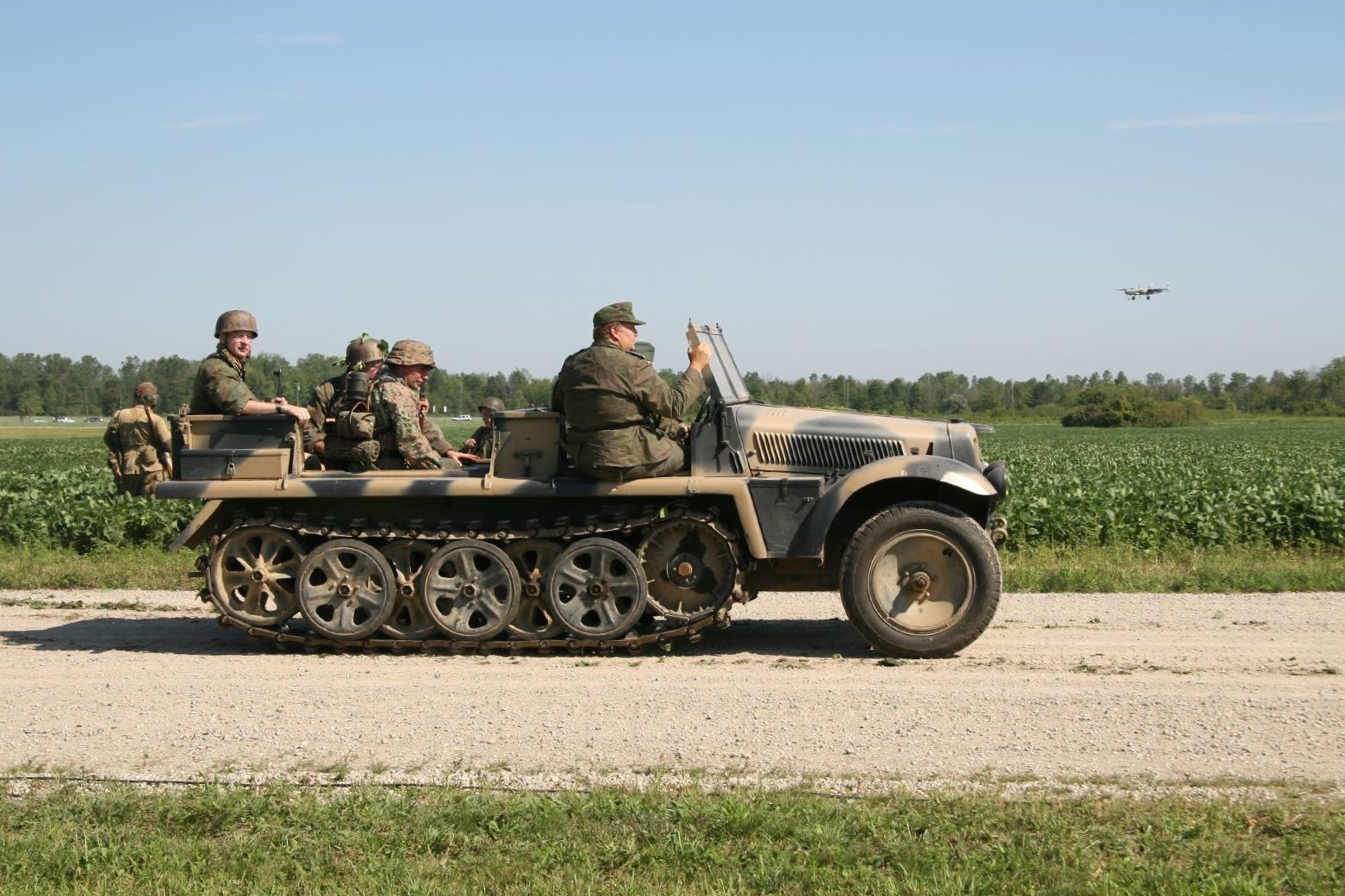
One of the original 12 delivered to Sweden in 1940, now with its current owner in the US.

A restored Swedish Artilleritraktor m/43 or Volvo HBT, 2011.

When war broke out in September 1939, Sweden maintained a policy of neutrality. To support this policy, a rapid upgrade of aging military equipment was necessary. Guns, vehicles and aircraft was both manufactured domestically and purchased abroad. Artillery guns, 10.5 cm leFH 18 and towing vehicles was purchased from Germany in the winter of 1939/1940 and deliveries started in 1940. The towing vehicles were partly Klöckner-Deutz A330 4x4 trucks and some Demag D7 halftracks. The halftracks would be used in sub-arctic climate and all twelve Demags were, in the autumn of 1940, delivered along with twelve guns to the 8th Artillery regiment (A8) in the northern city of Boden, close to the arctic circle. Noteworthy is that the 10.5 cm leFH 18 ("Haubits m/39" in Swedish terms) is a significantly heavier gun than the ones the German army towed with this vehicle. In Sweden, the Demag was called "Artilleritraktor m/40" or "Arttrak m/40" for short.

In 1941, Sweden tried to purchase more Demags, but the ongoing war made this impossible. Orders then went to Volvo to make a "copy" (the "Artilleritraktor m/43" or "Volvo HBT"), were the only specific requirement from the Swedish army was that the track links had to be interchangeable with the Demag. The Volvo HBT was never used by the A8.

After the war, another twelve Sd.Kfz. 10, bought as surplus from Norway and elsewhere, were delivered to A8. The total of 24 Sd.Kfz. 10 were used in training gun crews all through the 1950s and early 1960s. In 1966, all were sold to the highest bidders at Kalix airfield and they ended up in the villages surrounding Kalix and Boden. In the mid 1970s - 1980s, they were traced down and sold abroad. The last known one left Sweden in 1992. Of the 24 sold in 1966, as of 2014 fourteen have known locations with collectors and in museums all over the world.

== In popular culture ==
Two light half-tracks, one original Sd.Kfz. 10 and a modified Swedish Artilleritraktor m/43 or Volvo HBT, appear together on the opening scenes of the British 1983 supernatural horror film The Keep, set in 1941 Romania.

== See also ==
- Sd.Kfz. 4
- Sd.Kfz. 6
- Sd.Kfz. 7
- Sd.Kfz. 8
- Sd.Kfz. 9
- Sd.Kfz. 11
- Sd.Kfz. 250
- Sd.Kfz. 251
