= John Steadman =

John Steadman may refer to:

- John Steadman (sportswriter) (1927–2001), American sportswriter for The Baltimore Sun
- John Steadman (physician) (1710–1791), Scottish antiquary
- John Steadman (actor) (1909–1993), American radio personality and film editor
- John M. Steadman (born 1930), American judge

== See also ==
- Jack Steadman (born 1989 or 1990), English singer-songwriter, musician, and record producer
- Jack Steadman (American football executive) (1928–2015), American National Football League executive
- John Stedman (disambiguation)
