= Steadman =

Steadman may refer to:

- Steadman (name), a list of people with the surname or given name
- Steadman (band), a British rock band
- Steadman TS100, recreation of Jaguar SS100 sports car

== See also ==
- Barrows-Steadman Homestead
- Draper-Steadman House
- Tefft-Steadman House
- Stedman (disambiguation)
- Steedman (disambiguation)
