= Smedman =

Smedman is a surname. Notable people with the surname include:

- Lisa Smedman, Canadian writer
- Mona Smedman (born 1975), Swedish politician

== See also ==
- Stedman (disambiguation)
