= Sd.Kfz. 253 =

leichter Gepanzerter Beobachtungskraftwagen Sd.Kfz. 253
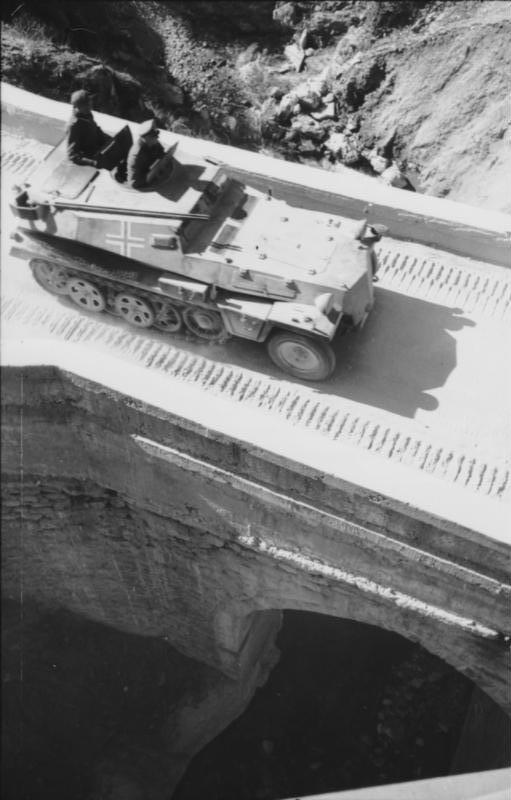
- Crossing a bridge in the Balkans, 1941
- Type: armoured half-track
- Place of origin: Nazi Germany

Service history
- Used by: Germany

Production history
- Manufacturer: Demag/Wegmann
- Produced: 1940–1941
- No. built: 285

Specifications
- Length: 4.70 m (15 ft 5 in)
- Width: 1.95 m (6 ft 5 in)
- Height: 1.80 m (5 ft 11 in)
- Crew: 4
- Armor: 8–18 mm
- Main armament: 7.92mm MG34 with 2,010 rounds
- Engine: 6-cylinder Maybach HL42TRKM; 100 hp (75 kW)
- Maximum speed: 65 km/h (40 mph)

Sd.Kfz. 253 leichter Gepanzerter Beobachtungskraftwagen was a German half-track observation vehicle that artillery forward observers used to accompany tank and mechanized infantry units. The vehicle belonged to the Sd.Kfz. 250 family. The appearance was similar to the Sd.Kfz. 250, but the Sd.Kfz. 253 variant was fully enclosed. Demag/Wegman manufactured 285 vehicles between 1940 and 1941.

== History ==
From 1937, the German army needed a new observation vehicle to provide reconnaissance and fire control support for assault guns such as StuG III. Developing a new chassis was considered too expensive, so the Sd. Kfz. 253 was designed based on the Sd. Kfz. 250 and designated Leichter gepanzerter Beobachtungskraftwagen. The first prototype was built in 1939. Series production began in March 1940. The vehicle entered service with artillery units, StuG III batteries, and tank units. Its first wartime use was in 1939 in Poland during the crossing of the Bzura River.

== Production ==
The series production continued from 1940 to 1941, with a total of 285 vehicles manufactured. The chassis was produced by Demag, while other components were produced by Wegmann and Büssing-NAG. From September 1940 the production was moved to the Austrian company Gebr. Bohler & Co AG. The vehicle was considered too expensive, and production lines were replaced by the cheaper Sd.Kfz.250/5 and Sd.Kfz. 250/12.

== Design ==
The Sd.Kfz.253 was similar to the Sd.Kfz.250. Its main difference was a fully enclosed fighting compartment with two hatches on the roof. The primary hatch was located near the driver’s position and was equipped with openings for a periscope.

The vehicle was fitted with a FuG 7 radio and a FuG 2 shortwave radio. The antenna was mounted at the rear on the right side, although some vehicles were equipped with a frame antenna on the roof. The vehicle could also be armed with an MG 34 or MG 42 machine gun, mounted internally within the hull. The maximum armor thickness reached 14.5 mm, providing protection against small arms fire.

The engine compartment was located at the front of the vehicle and housed a six-cylinder, water-cooled Maybach HL 42 TRKM petrol engine, producing up to 100 hp (75 kW) at 2,800 rpm. The maximum road speed was 65 km/h (40 mph), with an operational range of up to 320 km.
