= Sd.Kfz. 250 =

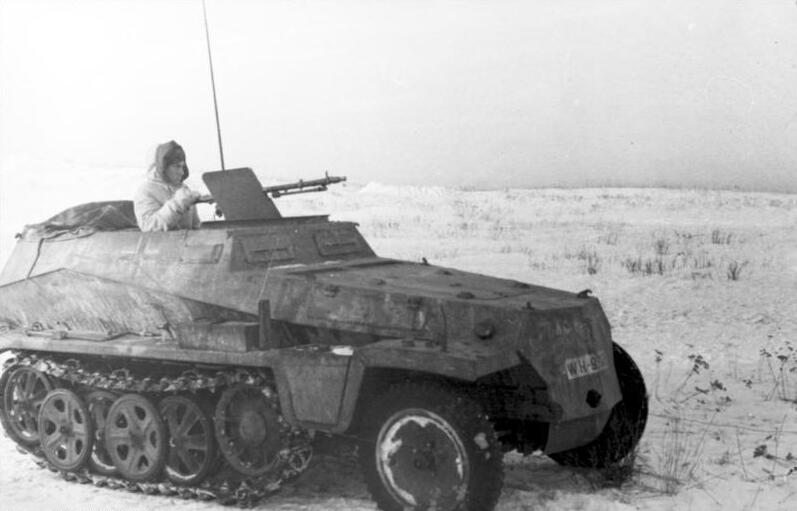
- Sd.Kfz. 250/2
- Type: Half-track armoured personnel carrier
- Place of origin: Nazi Germany

Service history
- In service: 1941–1945
- Used by: Nazi Germany; Kingdom of Romania
- Wars: World War II

Production history
- Designer: Demag
- Designed: 1939–1940
- Manufacturer: Demag, Adlerwerke, Büssing-NAG, MWC
- Unit cost: 20,420 ℛ︁ℳ︁
- Produced: 1941–1945
- No. built: Approx. 6,628
- Variants: see list below

Specifications (Sd.Kfz. 250/1 Ausf. A)
- Mass: Load: 5,800 kg (12,800 lb)
- Length: 4.56 m (15 ft 0 in)
- Width: 1.945 m (6 ft 5 in)
- Height: 1.66 m (5 ft 5 in)
- Crew: 2 + 4
- Armour: 5.5–14.5 mm (0.22–0.57 in)
- Main armament: 1 or 2 x 7.92 mm (0.312 in) MG 34 machine guns
- Engine: Maybach HL42 TRKM 6-cylinder, water-cooled petrol 100 PS (99 hp, 74 kW)
- Power/weight: 17.2 hp/ton
- Transmission: 7 + 3 speed Maybach VG 102128 H
- Suspension: Overlapping torsion bar (track) Leaf spring (wheels)
- Ground clearance: 28.5 cm (10 in)
- Fuel capacity: 140 L (37 US gal)
- Operational range: Road: 300–320 km (190–200 mi); Cross Country: 180–200 km (110–120 mi)
- Maximum speed: Road: 76 km/h (47 mph)

The Sd.Kfz. 250 (German: Sonderkraftfahrzeug 250; 'special motor vehicle') was a light armoured half-track, very similar in appearance to the larger Hanomag-designed Sd.Kfz. 251, and built by the DEMAG firm, for use by Nazi Germany in World War II. Most variants were open-topped and had a single access door in the rear.

The Sd. Kfz 250 was adopted in 1939 to supplement the standard half-track. Production delays meant that the first vehicle did not appear until mid-1941.

== Development ==
In 1939, the Inspectorate for Motorised Troops (AHA/In 6) decided that it would be useful for armoured half-tracks to accompany tanks in the attack. These could meet the requirements for smaller vehicles to be used in the headquarters, artillery observer, radio, and reconnaissance roles.

Demag, the designer of the smallest half-track in service, the Sd.Kfz. 10, was selected to develop the "light armoured troop carrier" (leichter gepanzerter Mannschafts-Transportwagen) or Sd.Kfz. 250.

To this end, the Sd.Kfz. 10 hull was shortened by one road wheel station, and an armoured hull (Panzerwanne) constructed around the truncated running gear.

While intended as a derivative of a standard inventory item, eventually virtually every component was redesigned and specific to the Sd.Kfz. 250.

== Description ==
Power for the Sd.Kfz. 250 was provided by a Maybach 6-cylinder, water-cooled, 4.17-litre (254 cu in) HL 42 TRKM gasoline engine of 100 horsepower (100 PS). It had a semi-automatic pre-selector transmission with seven forward and three reverse gears: Maybach SRG, type VG 102 128 H, (SRG=Schaltreglergetriebe, VG=Variorex-Getriebe, H=Hohlachse).

Gears were first selected and then the change pedal depressed to change the ratio, the next gear could then be selected in advance. It could attain 76 km/h (47 mph), but the driver was cautioned not to exceed 65 km/h (40 mph).

Both tracks and wheels were used for steering. The steering system was set up so that gentle turns used just the steerable front wheels, but brakes would be applied to the tracks the farther the steering wheel was turned. The Sd.Kfz. 250 also inherited the track-sparing but more complicated rollers in place of the more commonplace toothed sprockets.

The track ran on four double roadwheels overlapping and interleaved in the so-called Schachtellaufwerk design used by nearly all German half-tracked vehicles, mounted on swing arms sprung by torsion bars, track tension being maintained by an idler wheel, mounted at the rear.

The front wheels had transversely mounted leaf springs and shock absorbers (the only ones fitted) to dampen impacts.

The Sd.Kfz. 250 (and its parent, the Sd.Kfz. 10) were unique among German half-track designs as they used a hull rather than a frame or chassis.

=== Armour ===
Thickness/slope from the vertical	Front	Side	Rear	Top/Bottom
Superstructure	14.5 mm (0.57 in)/30°	8 mm (0.31 in)/35-30°	10 mm (0.39 in)/10°	5.5 mm (0.22 in)/?°
Hull	14.5 mm (0.57 in)/12°	10 mm (0.39 in) to 14.5 mm (0.57 in)/0°	8 mm (0.31 in)/45°	5.5 mm (0.22 in)

== Service history ==
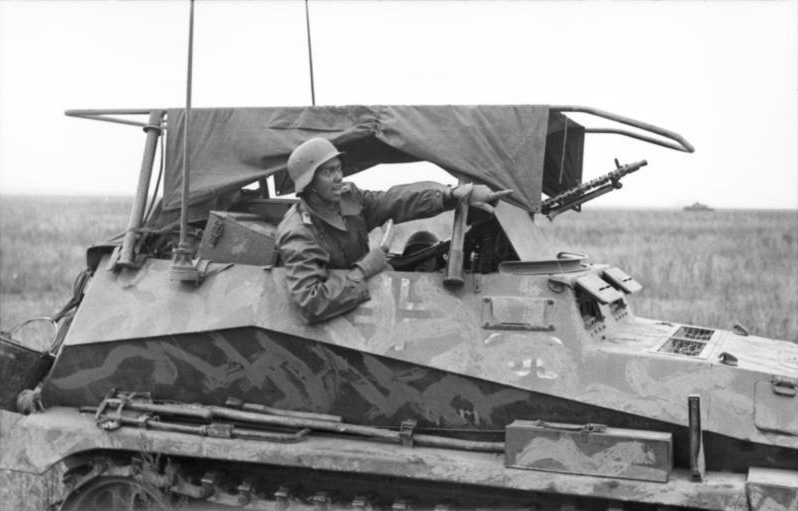
A Sd.Kfz. 250/3 radio vehicle

The vehicle was used in a wide variety of roles throughout World War II. The basic troop carrier version was used as an armoured personnel carrier for reconnaissance units, carrying scout sections. This basic variant usually mounted one or two MG34 machineguns. Later variants carried 20 mm, 37 mm, and even 75 mm guns to support the more lightly armed versions (see table below).

Several special-purpose variants were seen early in the war. The 250/3 and 250/5 were command variants, with fewer seats but equipped with long-range radio equipment. These were used by battalion and higher commanders as personal command vehicles, most famously the 250/3 used by Erwin Rommel in the North African campaign. Early versions had large 'bedframe' antennas, which were easy to spot at long range, making them more vulnerable to artillery fire. Later variants dispensed with this and instead used the far less conspicuous whip antenna.

The Sd.Kfz. 253 variant was fully enclosed, and was used by artillery observers to accompany tank and mechanized infantry units.

The initial design had a multi-faceted armoured body constructed from multiple plates, which gave good protection against small arms fire but was both slow and costly to manufacture, and resulted in a cramped interior.

Production of this early version stopped in October 1943 with some 4,200 built and the complex body-shape dropped in favour of a neue art (new version) with flattened crew compartment sides made from a single piece of armour. This greatly simplified manufacture but in both variants the level of protection was minimal - rifle-calibre small-arms fire and shell fragments would likely be stopped, but heavy machine guns, anti-tank rifles and virtually any form of artillery could perforate the Sd.Kfz. 250 even at long range. Based on the acceptance figures from the Waffenamt, the assembly plants built a total of 6,628 Sd.Kfz. 250 of all versions between June 1941 and April 1945:

- 1941: 389
- 1942: 1374
- 1943: 2895
- 1944: 1701
- 1945: 269

In August 1943, Romania acquired a total of 27 armoured half-tracks, of both the 251 and 250 types. Sd.Kfz. 251s were known as SPW mijlociu ("medium SPW") in Romanian service, while Sd.Kfz. 250s were referred to as SPW ușor ("light SPW").

== Variants ==
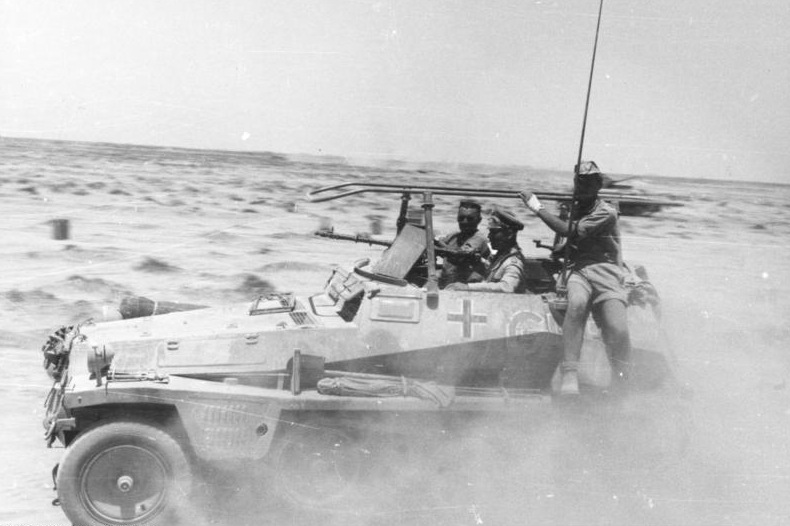
Rommel amidst advancing units in his Sd.Kfz. 250/3 command vehicle "GREIF" (English: 'Griffin').

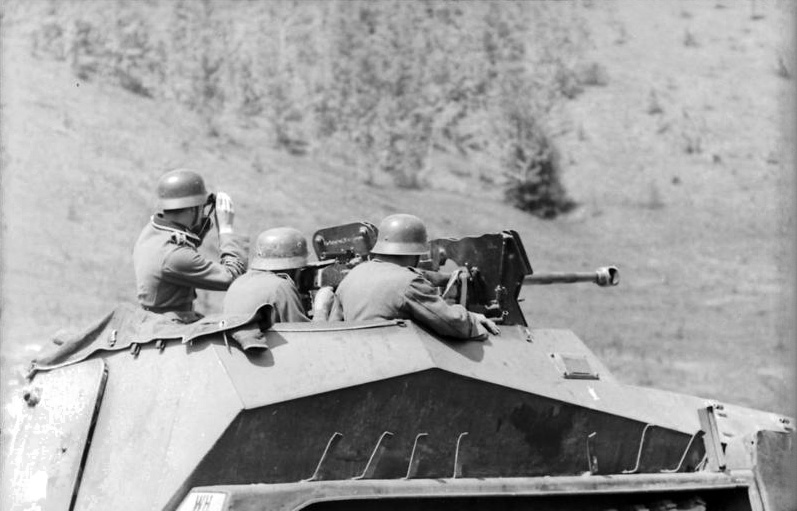
German soldiers fire the 2.8 cm sPzB 41 heavy anti-tank rifle on the Sd.Kfz. 250/11. The vehicle was assigned to the elite Großdeutschland Division engaged on the Eastern Front.

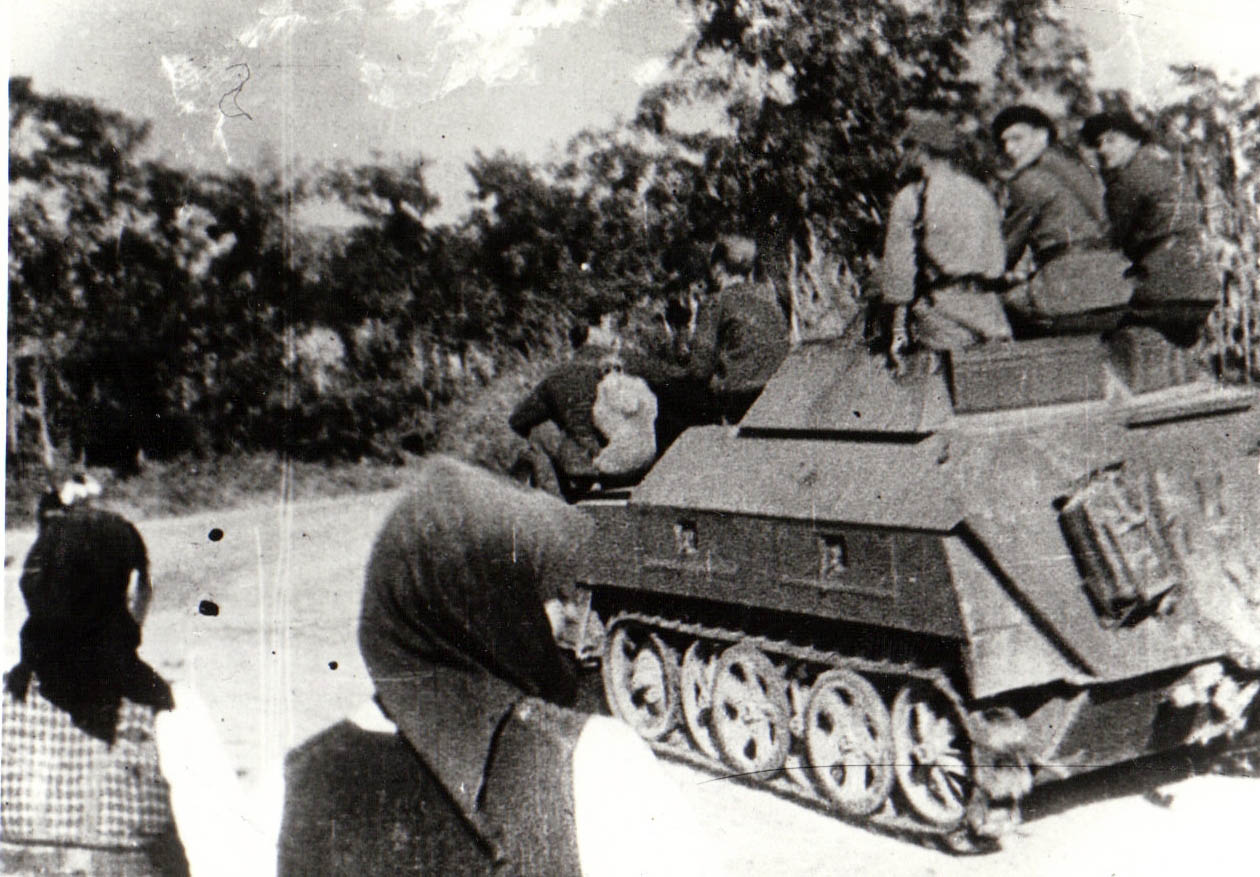
Romanian soldiers on a Sd.Kfz. 250/9 Neu in Transylvania, September–October 1944

Sd.Kfz. 250/1 leichter Schützenpanzerwagen
The standard troop carrier.

Sd.Kfz. 250/2 leichter Fernsprechpanzerwagen
Equipped with cable-laying gear.

Sd.Kfz. 250/3 leichter Funkpanzerwagen
Command variant, equipped with radio equipment and a "bedstead" aerial frame.

Sd.Kfz. 250/3-I (Fu 7, Fu 8, Fu.Spr. f) (Luftwaffe)
Sd.Kfz. 250/3-II (Fu 5, Fu.Spr. f)
Sd.Kfz. 250/3-III (Fu 8, Fu 4, Fu.Spr. f)
Sd.Kfz. 250/3-IV (Fu 8, Fu.Spr. f)
Sd.Kfz. 250/3-V (Fu 12, Fu.Spr. f)

Sd.Kfz. 250/4

- Sd.Kfz. 250/4 leichter Truppenluftschutzpanzerwagen

Antiaircraft variant armed with a dual MG 34 machine gun; never reached production.

- Sd.Kfz. 250/4 leichter Beobachtungspanzerwagen

Observation vehicle for Sturmgeschütz detachments.

Sd.Kfz. 250/5 leichter Beobachtungspanzerwagen
Command variant with additional radio equipment.

Sd.Kfz. 250/6 leichter Munitionspanzerwagen
Ammunition carrier for assault guns.

- Sd.Kfz. 250/6 Ausf A

carried 70 rounds for 7,5 cm StuK 37 L/24 gun.

- Sd.Kfz. 250/6 Ausf B

carried 60 rounds for 7,5 cm StuK 40 L/48 gun.

Sd.Kfz. 250/7

- Sd.Kfz. 250/7 leichter Schützenpanzerwagen (schwerer Granatwerfer)

mounted an 81 mm mortar.

- Sd.Kfz. 250/7 leichter Schützenpanzerwagen (Munitionsfahrzeug)

Ammunition transporter - carried 66 rounds for 81 mm mortar.

Sd.Kfz. 250/8 leichter Schützenpanzerwagen (7.5 cm)
Support variant armed with a 7.5 cm KwK 37 L/24 gun and an MG 34.

Sd.Kfz. 250/9 leichter Schützenpanzerwagen (2 cm)
Reconnaissance variant with a 2 cm KwK 38 autocannon and a coaxial MG (MG 34 or MG 42) in a low, open-topped turret identical to that of the Sd.Kfz. 222 armoured car.

Sd.Kfz. 250/10 leichter Schützenpanzerwagen (3.7 cm PaK)
Reconnaissance platoon leader's variant with 3.7 cm PaK 35/36. This was the same as the antitank gun used in a towed mode early in the war. Occasionally, the gun was fitted with a small shield to protect the gunners.

Sd.Kfz. 250/11 leichter Schützenpanzerwagen (schwere Panzerbüchse 41)
With a 2.8 cm sPzB 41 heavy anti-tank rifle and an MG 34.

Sd.Kfz. 250/12 leichter Messtruppanzerwagen
Survey and artillery range spotting vehicle.

Sd.Kfz. 252 leichter gepanzerter Munitionskraftwagen
Ammunition carrier for Sturmgeschütz.

Sd.Kfz. 253 leichter gepanzerter Beobachtungskraftwagen
Artillery observer vehicle, with fully enclosed armoured body and artillery radios.

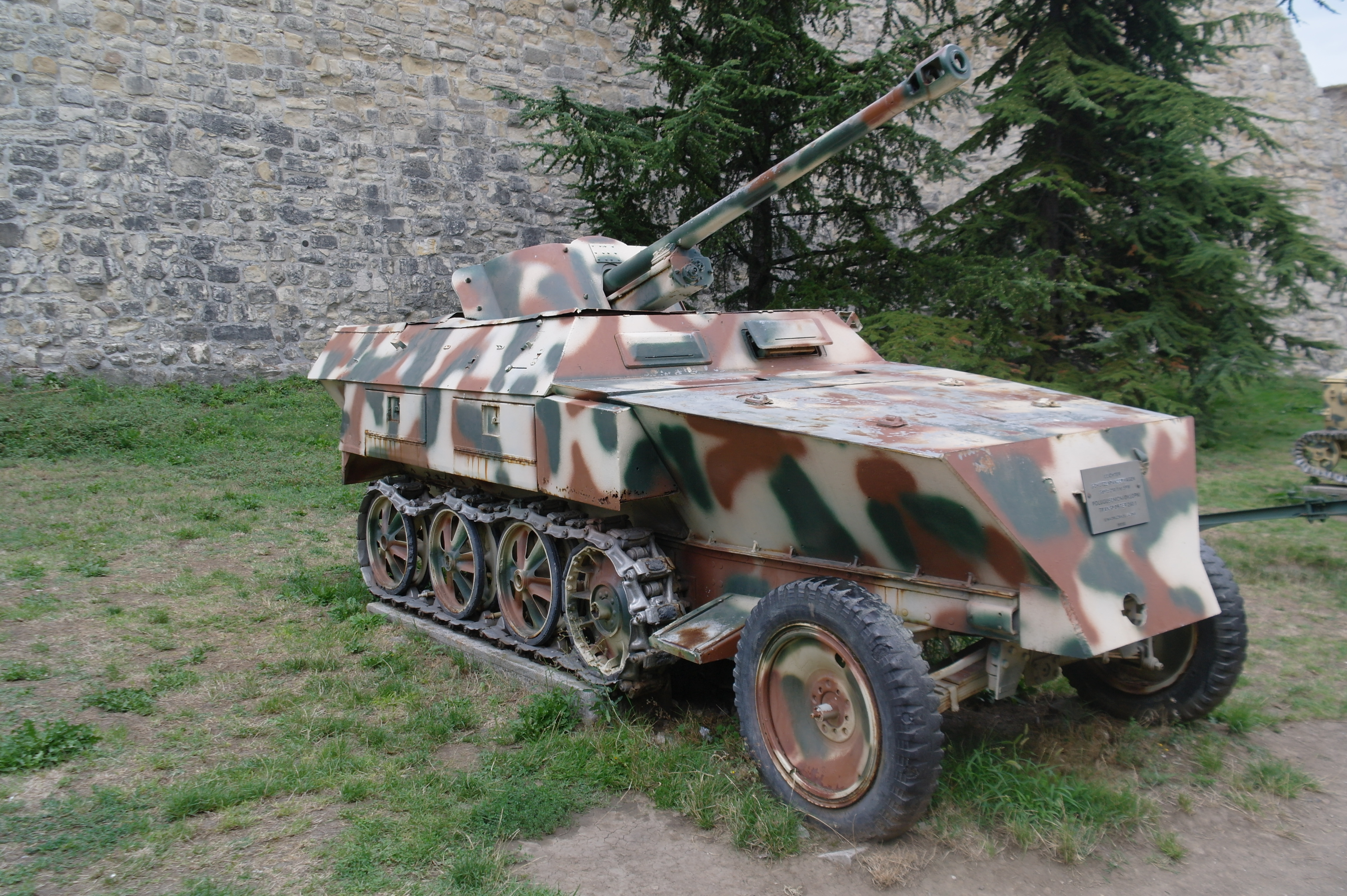
Sd.Kfz. 250 Neu with a Pak 38 mounted on the top.

Plus numerous field modifications

Such as adding light artillery pieces such as the 3.7 cm Pak 36 or 5 cm Pak 38 to the basic version.

== See also ==
- Kégresse track – Continuous track consisting of a flexible belt rather than interlocking metal segments
- M2 Half-track – (United States)
- M3 Half-track – (United States)
- Sd.Kfz. 251 – (Nazi Germany)
- Type 1 Ho-Ha – (Empire of Japan)
