= Steadman (name) =

Steadman is a surname of Germanic origin. It is also a masculine given name. People with the name include:

== Surname ==
- A. F. Steadman (born 1992), British author
- Alison Steadman (born 1946), British actress
- Amy Steadman (born 1984), American soccer player
- Bernice Steadman (1925–2015), American aviator
- Carl Steadman (born 1970), American web entrepreneur
- Catherine Steadman (born 1983), British actress
- Charles Steadman (1790–1868), American architect
- Craig Steadman (born 1982), English snooker player
- David Steadman, American palaeontologist and ornithologist
- Graham Steadman (born 1961), English rugby player
- Jack Steadman (American football executive) (1928–2015)
- Jack Steadman (musician), British musician
- James Steadman (born 1983), British cricketer
- James Steadman (politician) (1818–1913), Canadian lawyer, legislator, and judge
- Jan Steadman (born 1947), Trinidadian footballer
- John Steadman (sportswriter) (1927–2001), American sportswriter
- John Steadman (actor) (1909–1993), American actor
- John Steadman (physician) (1710–1791), Scottish antiquary
- John M. Steadman (born 1930), American judge
- Joseph Steadman (1878–1944), English footballer
- Kelley Steadman (born 1990), American ice hockey player
- Ken Steadman (1969–1996), American television actor
- Lauren Steadman (born 1992), British Paralympic swimmer and paratriathlete
- Mark Steadman (novelist) (born 1930), American novelist
- Mark Steadman (priest) (born 1974), Anglican Archdeacon of Stow
- Oli Steadman (born 1987), British-South African musician
- Pat Steadman (born 1964), American legislator
- Ralph Steadman (born 1936), British illustrator and cartoonist
- Richard Steadman (1937–2023), American orthopedic surgeon
- Robert Steadman (born 1965), British composer
- Royal Charles Steadman (1875–1964), American botanical artist
- Vera Steadman (1900–1966), American film actress
- W. C. Steadman (1851–1911), British trade unionist and politician

== Given name ==
- Steadman Marlin (born 1980), American race car driver
- Steadman Vincent Sanford (1871–1945), American university administrator
- Steadman S. Shealy (born 1958), American attorney and football player
- Steadman Upham (1949–2017), American archaeologist and university administrator

== See also ==
- Ray Steadman-Allen (1922–2014), British Salvation Army officer and composer
- Stedman (surname)
