= Steedman =

Steedman may refer to:

== People ==
- Steedman (surname)

== Places ==
- Steedman, Missouri, unincorporated community in Callaway County in the U.S. state of Missouri
- Steedman Estate or Casa del Herrero, home and gardens in Montecito near Santa Barbara, California
- Steedman-Ray House or 1925 F Street Club, historic home, the official residence of the President of The George Washington University

== Other ==
- Morris and Steedman, architecture firm based in Edinburgh, Scotland

== See also ==
- Steadman (disambiguation)
- Stedman (disambiguation)
