= Sd.Kfz. 252 =

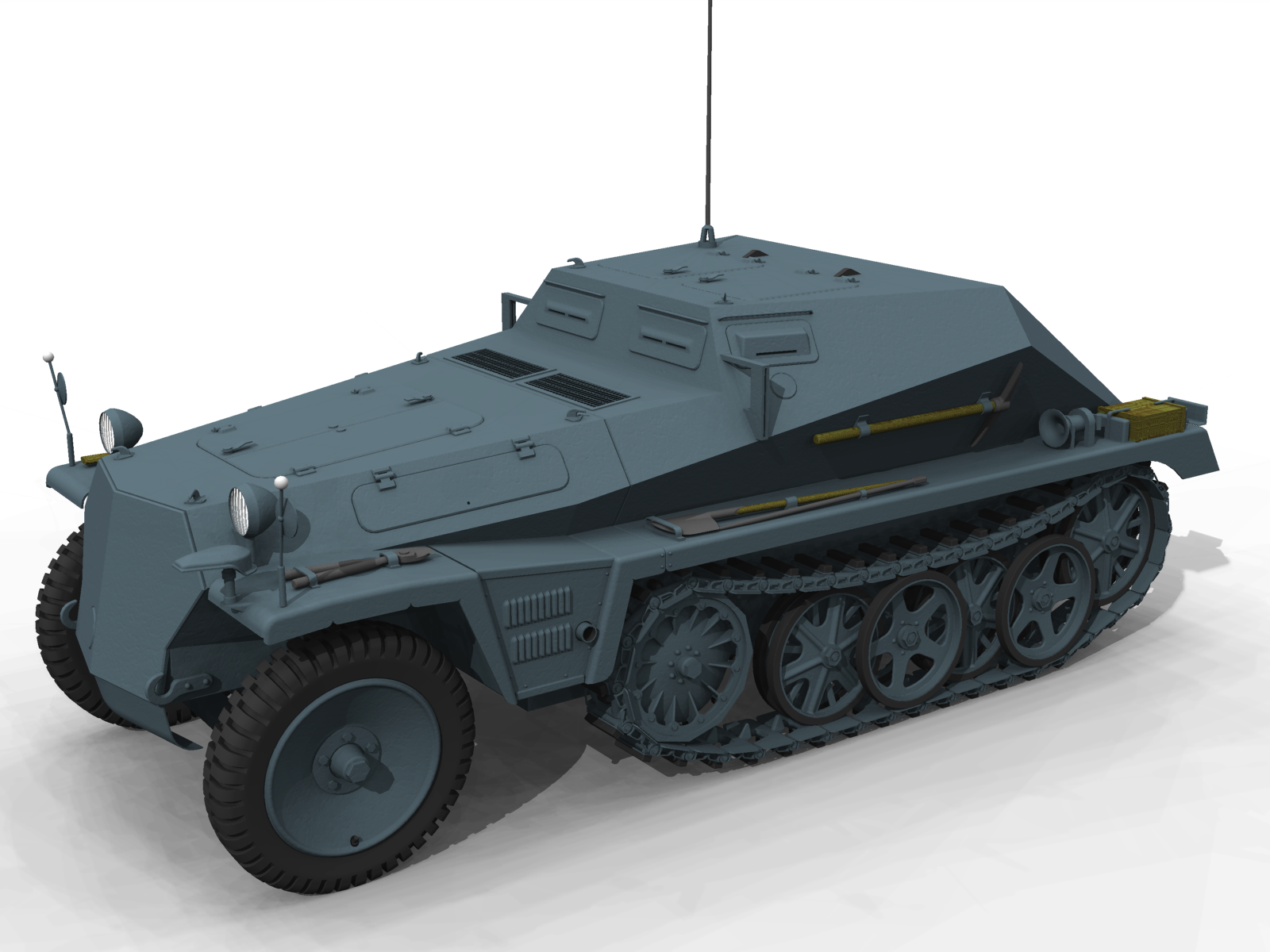
- Type: Ammunition Carrier
- Place of origin: Nazi Germany

Service history
- In service: 1940
- Wars: World War II

Production history
- Designer: Demag AG
- Manufacturer: Demag, Wegmann and Deutsche Werke
- Produced: June thru December 1940 (Demag and Wegman), January thru September 1941 (Deutsche Werke)
- No. built: 413

Specifications
- Mass: 5.73 tons
- Length: 4.7 meters
- Width: 1.95 meters
- Height: 1.8 meters
- Crew: 2
- Armor: 18 mm (0.7 in) (see chart)
- Main armament: 7.92mm MG 34 machine gun
- Engine: Maybach HL42 TRKM; 110 hp (82 kW)
- Operational range: 320 km (200 mi) (road), 175 km (109 mi) (off-road)
- Maximum speed: 65 km/h (40 mph)

The Leichter Gepanzerter Munitionstransportwagen (Sd. Kfz. 252) was a light armoured ammunition carrier used by Nazi Germany during World War II as early as the Battle of France in June 1940.

== History ==
The Sd. Kfz. 252 was based on the Sd.Kfz. 250 half-track and used the same chassis. Initially built by the Demag and Wegmann firms from June through to December 1940, production shifted to Deutsche Werke from January to September 1941. 413 vehicles were manufactured, all of which were issued as ammunition resupply vehicles to Sturmartillerie batteries and saw operation on both European fronts.

As additional load capacity was required, the Sonder-Anhänger (Sd. Ah.) für Munition (7,5 cm) (Sd. Ah. 32/1) was developed as an ammunition transport trailer for towing behind the Sd. Kfz. 252. This trailer carried an additional 36 rounds of 75mm ammunition.

During the Battle of France, Sd.Kfz. 252s were used by Sturmartillerie Batteries 640 and 659. Due to production delays with the new Sd. Kfz. 252, Sturmartillerie Batteries 660 and 665 went into battle using “turretless” Panzerkampfwagen I munitions carriers.

On the Eastern front, units using the Sd. Kfz. 252 included the Sturmgeschütz-Abteilung 184, 190, 191, and 210.

The Sd.Kfz.252 was eventually replaced by the Sd.Kfz.250/6.

== Armour breakdown ==
Armour Chart
Upper Front Hull	Lower Front Hull	Upper Hull Sides	Lower Hull Sides	Rear Hull	Top Hull	Bottom Hull
18 mm at 30 degrees	18 mm at 12 degrees	8 mm at 30 degrees	8 mm at 30 degrees	8 mm at 45 degrees and 8 mm at 55 degrees	8 mm at 90 degrees	8 mm at 90 degrees

== Miscellaneous facts ==
- Used the FuG15 or the FuG16 radio system
- Transmission had 7 forward and 3 reverse gears
- Was armed with a 7.92 MG34
- Six-cylinder, water-cooled, 3000 RPM, engine
- Later, some of these vehicles were converted to armoured radio vehicles, Leichter Pz.Bef.Wg.

== Gallery ==
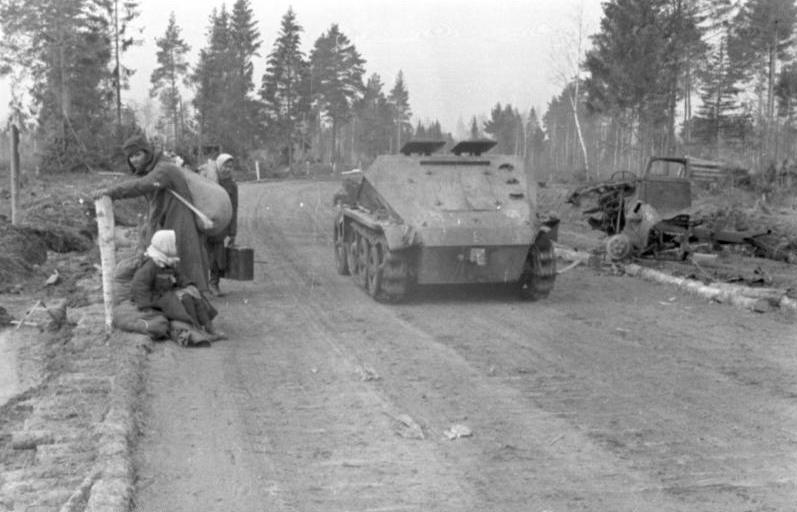
Rear view, Russia, January 1942.

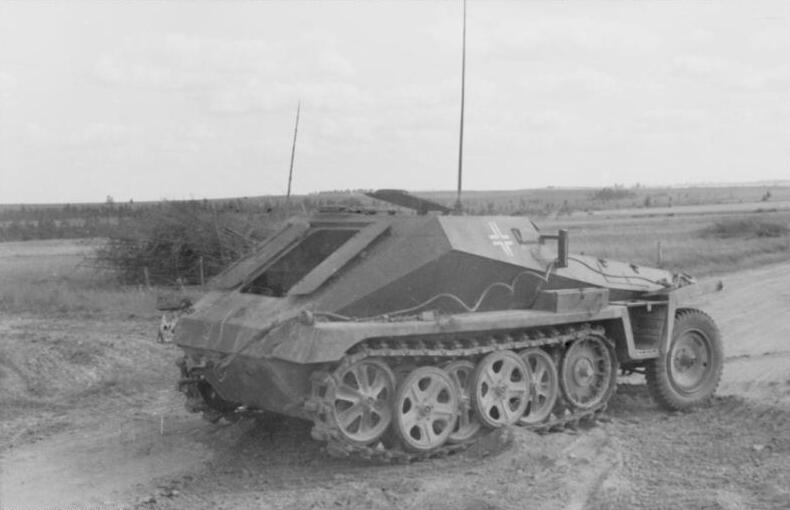
Side view, rear, Russia, August 1943.

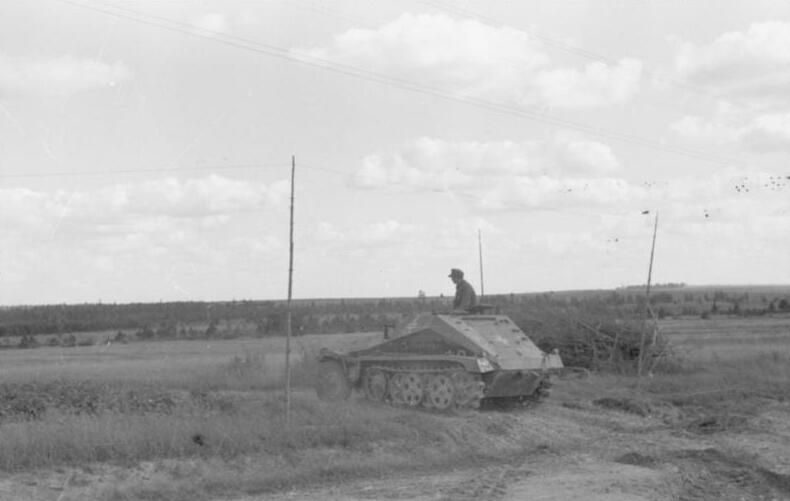
On the ground, in Russia, August 1943.

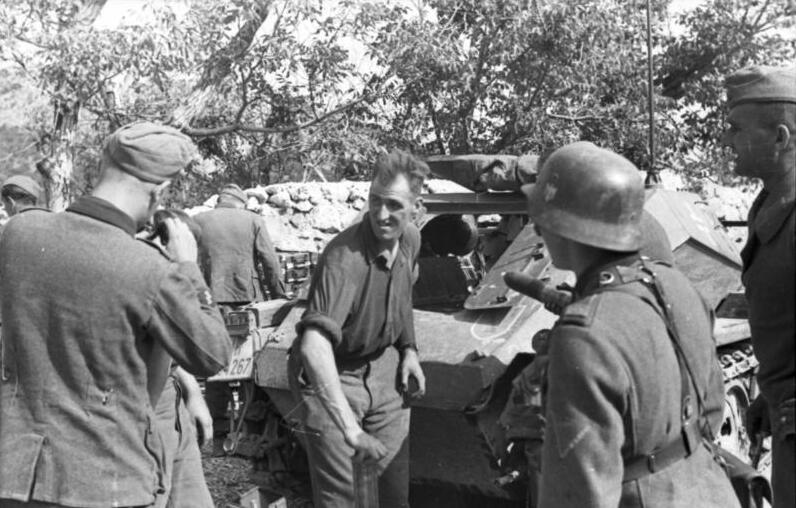
German soldiers loading ammunition from a Sd.Kfz 252, Crimea, June 1942.

== Sources ==
- World War 2 Vehicles
- Axis History Forum
