= Stedman (name) =

Stedman is a surname and given name. Notable people with the name include:

== Surname ==
- Arthur Stedman (1868–1958), British architect
- Bert Stedman (born 1956), American politician from Alaska
- Charles Stedman (1753–1812), British Army officer, writer, and historian
- Charles Harrison Stedman (1805–1866), American medical society founder
- Charles Manly Stedman (1841–1930), politician and lawyer from North Carolina
- Daniel Stedman, American filmmaker
- Edith G. Stedman (1888-1978), American social worker and educator
- Edmund Clarence Stedman (1833–1908), American poet, critic, and essayist
- Edward Stedman (1842–1925), senior British Indian Army officer
- Egerton Reuben Stedman (1872–1946), Canadian politician
- Elizabeth Clementine Stedman (1810–1889), American writer
- Fabian Stedman (1640–1713), English pioneer of method ringing in bell ringing
- Fred Stedman (1870–1918), English cricketer
- Geoffrey Ernest Stedman (born 1943), New Zealand physicist
- Harry Stedman (1848–1904), English clergyman and cricketer
- Ivan Stedman (1895–1979), Australian swimmer
- James Stedman, Member of Parliament
- John Stedman (disambiguation), multiple people, including:
  - John Andrew Stedman (1778–1833), Dutch lieutenant-general during the Waterloo campaign
  - John Gabriel Stedman (1744–1797), Dutch/British soldier
- Joseph F. Stedman (1898–1946), American religious leader and author
- Lincoln Stedman (1907–1948), American silent film actor
- Marshall Stedman (1874–1943), American stage and silent screen actor/director, playwright, author and drama teacher
- Myrtle Stedman (1883–1938), American actress
- Phyllis Stedman, Baroness Stedman (1916–1996), British politician
- Ray Stedman (1917–1992), American religious leader
- Seymour Stedman (1871–1948), American jurist and activist
- Thomas Lathrop Stedman (1853–1938), American medical doctor and authority
- Troy Stedman (born 1965), American football linebacker
- William Stedman (1765–1831), U.S. Representative from Massachusetts

== Given name ==
- Stedman Bailey (born 1990), American football wide receiver
- Stedman Graham (born 1951), American educator, author, businessman, speaker, and partner of Oprah Winfrey
- Stedman Pearson (born 1964), English singer and dancer
- Stedman Prescott (1896–1968), American jurist who served on the Supreme Court of Maryland

== See also ==
- Steadman (name)
