= Stedman v United Kingdom =

Stedman v United Kingdom (1997) 23 EHRR CD 168 is a UK labour law case, which deals with religious freedom, and the duty of an employer to let religious people have Sundays off.

== Facts ==
Ms Stedman, a Christian, had worked at an employment agency since 1990. From December 1991 the applicant, along with other staff, was required to work on Sundays. In the period from December 1991 to May 1992 she worked on 10 out of a total of 25 Sundays. On 27 April 1992 Ms. Stedman gave the manager one month's notice that she was no longer prepared to work on Sunday. On 7 May 1992 she was told that her contract of employment was to be amended to include Sunday as a normal working day, on a rota basis, with no enhanced rate of pay. The applicant refused to sign the new contract and said that she would continue working under her existing contract. On 4 June 1992 she was dismissed after 22 months of employment, and paid one month's pay in lieu of notice.

She claimed this was a breach of her right to freedom of religion under Art.9 ECHR. Under Art.1 the MS must secure Convention rights. She also complained of breach of her right to a family life under Art.8, because she was bound to work some Sundays, and her husband did not.

== Judgment ==
The European Commission of Human Rights (i.e. the case was not admitted to the actual court) stated by a majority that Ms Stedman resigned because she did not want to work. She was not dismissed because of her religion. Even if she had been employed by the state and dismissed in similar circumstances, there would not have even been an interference with her Art 9(1) rights. The application was ‘manifestly ill founded’ under Art 27(2) ECHR.

For Art 8, ‘given the almost inevitable compromise and balance between work and family commitments, particularly in families where both partners work’ there was no interference, to constitute any violation. Other challenges under Art.14 and Art.6 were similarly dismissed, and the case was inadmissible.

== See also ==
- UK employment discrimination law
- UK labour law
- Human Rights Act 1998
