= Demag =

Former German company

- Type: GmbH
- Industry: Engineering and service
- Founded: 1819
- Fate: Acquired by the Mannesmann group
- Successor: Demag Cranes & Components GmbH
- Headquarters: Düsseldorf, Germany
- Products: Bridge cranes, hoists, material handling equipment, gantry cranes and port technology
- Website: www.demag.com

Demag (In German Deutsche Maschinenbau-Aktiengesellschaft) was a German heavy equipment industrial group whose individual companies are now scattered. The Demag name can be today found for example as the Demag Cranes and Components and Sumitomo (SHI) Demag.

The roots of Demag date back prior to its formation, but became Märkische Maschinenbau-Anstalt, Ludwig A.-G in 1906 as the biggest crane building company in Germany employing 250–300 people. The company was a manufacturer of industrial cranes that included types like, bridge cranes, hoist (device), overhead cranes, Gantry crane to name a few. In 1910 came the hour of the Deutsche Maschinenfabrik in Duisburg – known worldwide by its telegram abbreviation Demag (now Demag Cranes & Components GmbH).

== Founding ==
The Demag company was formed finally 1910 in Duisburg through the union of the Märkische Maschinenbau-Anstalt L. Stuckenholz AG, the Duisburg Mechanical Engineering AG, and the Benrath Machine Works GmbH.

The Märkische Maschinenbau-Anstalt L. Stuckenholz AG traces back to the machine factory Mechanische Werkstätten Harkort & Co., founded 1819 in Wetter an der Ruhr, already beginning the manufacturing of cranes in 1840.

In 1908, they designed what was then the world's largest floating crane, built for Harland & Wolff in Belfast, which would be used for the building of the passenger liners RMS Olympic and RMS Titanic.

Starting in 1925, Demag also manufactured excavators. They expanded to manufacture locomotives and railroad cars. During the Second World War, armoured fighting vehicles (in particular Bergepanther) were built in the Berlin Staaken plant.

During the buildup to, and during World War II, Demag-designed halftrack military vehicles, both in unarmored "artillery tractor" models in the late 1930s, the basis for the powertrain of their armored Sd.Kfz. 250, which itself played an important role during the war, with just over 6,600 built by Demag and their subcontractors.

== Hydraulic era ==
In 1954, Demag developed their first hydraulic excavators. Demag would soon expand into construction machines, vehicle cranes, moving and conveying engineering (workshop crane and control devices), steel mill technology (complete metallurgical plants, in particular continuous casting equipment), compressors, and compressed air engineering. The company also became a world leader in the manufacturing of injection moulding machines.

== Mannesmann group ==
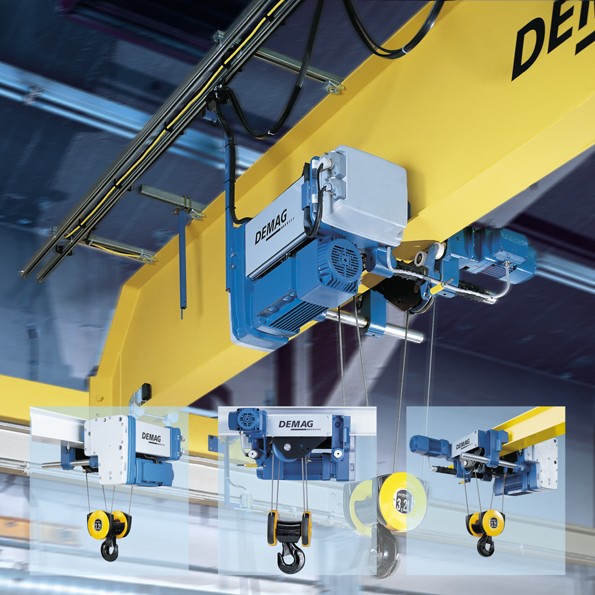
Demag Overhead crane and hoist (device) Demag Bridge Crane.

In 1973 the ownership of Demag was assumed by the Mannesmann group, based in Düsseldorf. In 1983 Mannesmann-Demag AG and Wean United, Inc. of Pittsburgh, United States, founded a daughter company to produce steel working equipment, Mannesmann Demag Wean Co.

A joint venture with the Japanese manufacturer Komatsu led to spinning off of the large-scale excavation operations and their renaming as Komatsu Mining.

The steel and rolling mill technology division, based in Duisburg, was spun off to Schloemann-Siemag (SMS) and continues today under the name SMS group.

The compressor division was sold in 1996 to CompAir, which was then part of the British Siebe/Invensys group, but has since become an independent company.

Later (1999), the injection moulding manufacturing was merged with that of Krauss-Maffei, which had itself been acquired by Mannesmann from 1989, to form Mannesmann Demag Krauss Maffei and formed part of Mannesmann Atecs (for Advanced Technologies), a holding company for all of Mannesmann's non-telecom activities. Krauss Maffei's general equipment manufacturing and defence portions later passed to Linke/Hoffmann/Busch. The holding company was later named Mannesmann Plastics Machinery or MPM, with primary divisions Demag Plastics and Krauss-Maffei.

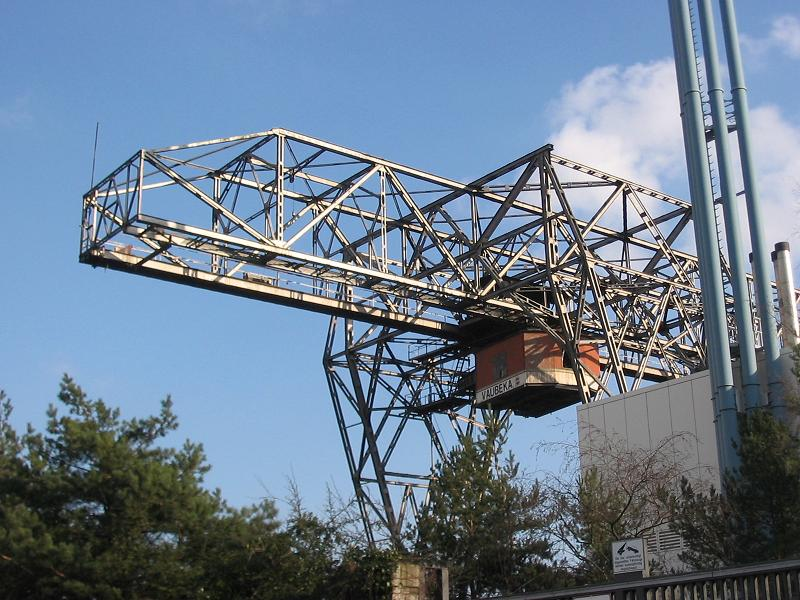
Crane built by Demag in 1935

== Dissolution as part of Vodafone's acquisition of Mannesmann ==
In February 2000 Mannesmann was taken over by Vodafone.

All of Mannesmann's industrial activities, which had been combined under Atecs (meaning Advanced Technologies) holding company in order to strategically separate mobile communications and industrial activities, were divested to a consortium of Siemens and Bosch. Siemens and Bosch then divested the different units between them and the Demag units became a part of Siemens. These were Demag plastics technology (with Krauss-Maffei), Demag compressor technology and Demag conveyor technology, which included the Demag mobile cranes and the crane manufacturer Gottwald.

== Restructuring, purchase and sales by KKR ==
In the autumn of 2001, Siemens sold the core activities of the former Demag (Demag Cranes & Components, Gottwald and MPM) to Kohlberg Kravis Roberts (KKR). Those that remained were restructured and became part of the new company focus for future growth. For example parts of the conveying engineering activities remained with Siemens under the name Dematic. In 2002 Siemens sold the Demag Mobile Cranes division, which has not been a part of the package sold to KKR, was sold to US based company Terex.

KKR initiated a major reorganization of the Demag Crane & Components organization, including a refocused effort of their product lines. The production and general company focus changed to Overhead cranes, hoists, Gantry cranes, and Portal cranes under the name Gottwald.

In 2006 KKR combined Demag Cranes and Gottwald under Demag Cranes Ag and went public.

in 2011 Terex completed the takeover of Demag when it purchased 82% of the shares of Demag Cranes Ag. Demag became the Terex Material Handling & Port Solutions (MHPS) division.

== Present structure ==
In 2008 KRR sold MPM to Sumitomo Heavy Industries and is known today as Sumitomo (SHI) Demag.

In 2019 Terex decided to sell the Mobile Cranes division to the Japan based Tadano and it became the Tadano Demag Gmbh. In 2020 Tadano Demag Gmbh filed for insolvency. Surviving restructuring Tadano announced that it will drop the Demag brand name in 2021.

In 2017 Konecranes from Finland purchases the MHPS division from Terex. In addition to becoming again a European owned company, Konecranes also revives the Demag name as the MHPS becomes the Demag Cranes & Components Gmbh.

== Notable dates ==
- 1819: The present-day Demag Cranes & Components GmbH founded under the name Mechanische Werkstätten Harkort & Co. in Wetter an der Ruhr. First Steam powered crane produced by Ludwig Stuckenholz company. Now Demag Cranes & Components GmbH.
- 1840: Demag Cranes & Components starts full production of Overhead cranes in Germany.
- 1906: The present-day Gottwald Port Technology GmbH founded under the name of Maschinenfabrik Ernst Halbach AG in Düsseldorf.
- 1910: Successor companies to Mechanische Werkstätten Harkort & Co. become part of Deutsche Maschinenfabrik AG (Demag: Demag starts production of Electric motor hoist.
- 1956: Leo Gottwald KG builds the first mobile harbor crane.
- 1969: Demag introduces the first AC motor with a sliding rotor on its crane product in the USA.
- 1988: Mannesmann takes over Leo Gottwald KG and integrates it in Mannesmann Demag AG.
- 1992: Restructuring of the Mannesmann Demag Group and spin-off of Mannesmann Demag Fördertechnik AG in Wetter.
- 1996: Mannesmann Demag Fördertechnik AG takes over the Mobile Cranes segment from Mannesmann Demag AG in Duisburg.
- 1997: Mannesmann Demag Fördertechnik AG is renamed Mannesmann Dematic AG.
- 2000: Mannesmann Dematic becomes an integral part of the Atecs Mannesmann AG Group; spin-off of Demag Cranes & Components GmbH (Wetter); Mannesmann taken over by Vodafone; Siemens AG and Robert Bosch GmbH acquire Atecs Mannesmann; the mechanical engineering division of Atecs Mannesmann AG, to which the current segments of Demag Cranes belonged, remains in the Siemens Group.
- 2002: Demag Cranes & Components GmbH and Gottwald Port Technology GmbH taken over by Demag Holding S.à r.l (Luxembourg), in which private equity investment funds advised by KKR hold an 81% interest and Siemens AG holds 19% interest.
- 2005: Demag Crane & Components Corp. produces the first "Smart hoist" with self-diagnostic capability.
- 2006: Consolidation of Demag Cranes & Components GmbH and Gottwald Port Technology GmbH under the umbrella of Demag Cranes AG and IPO and 23 June 2006.
- 2010: Demag becomes the first company to receive the industry certification by HMI.
- 30 June 2011: Terex gains 67% of Demag Cranes.
- 2017: Finland based Konecranes acquires Demag Overhead division in Wetter and Gottwald Port Cranes division from Terex and changes the name to Demag Cranes & Components GmbH.
- 2019: Japan based Tadano acquires the Demag Mobile Cranes business from Terex changes the name to Tadano Demag GmbH.
- 2020: Konecranes acquires MHE-Demag after purchasing Jebsen & Jessen's stake.

== Gallery ==
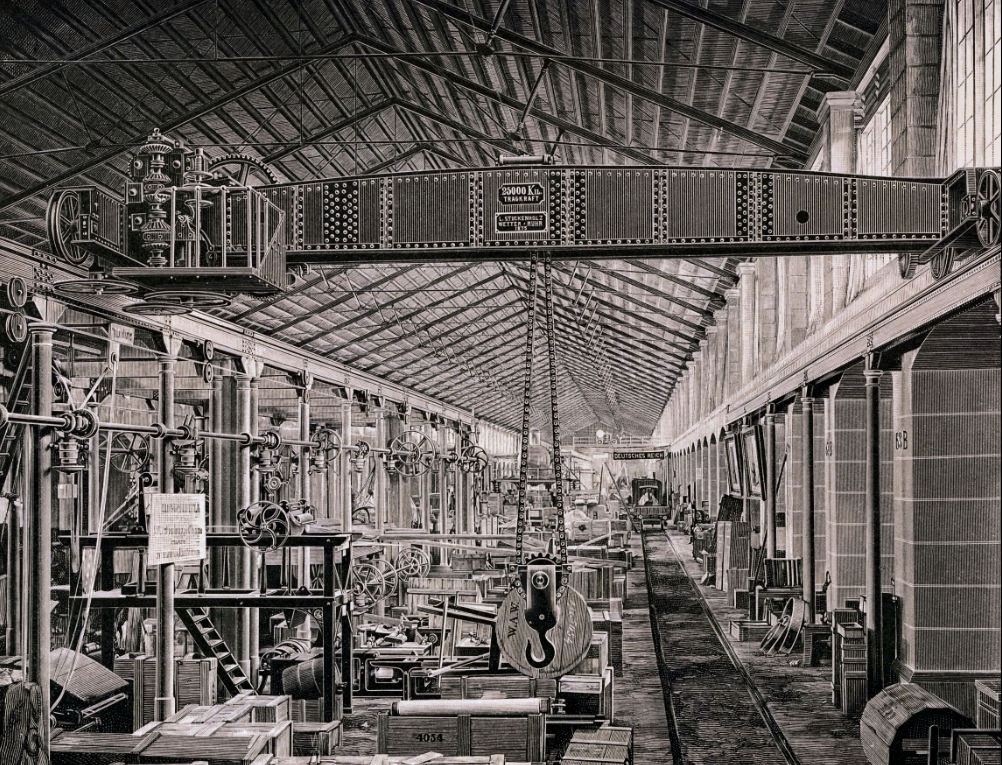
Example of steam powered overhead crane from 1875, produced by Ludwig Stuckenholz AG, Wetter an der Ruhr, Germany. Design developed by Rudolf Bredt from an original installation at Crewe railway works

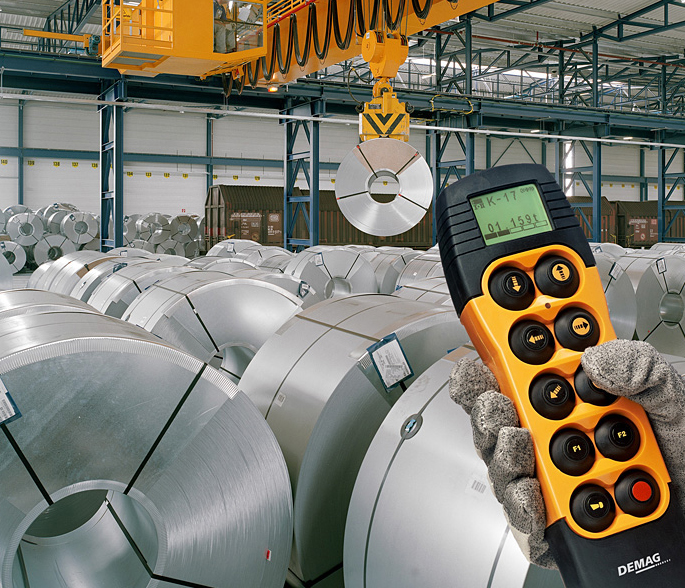
Circa 2010 Double girder top running Demag bridge crane operated via radio control. Radio control is often used when handling steel coils.

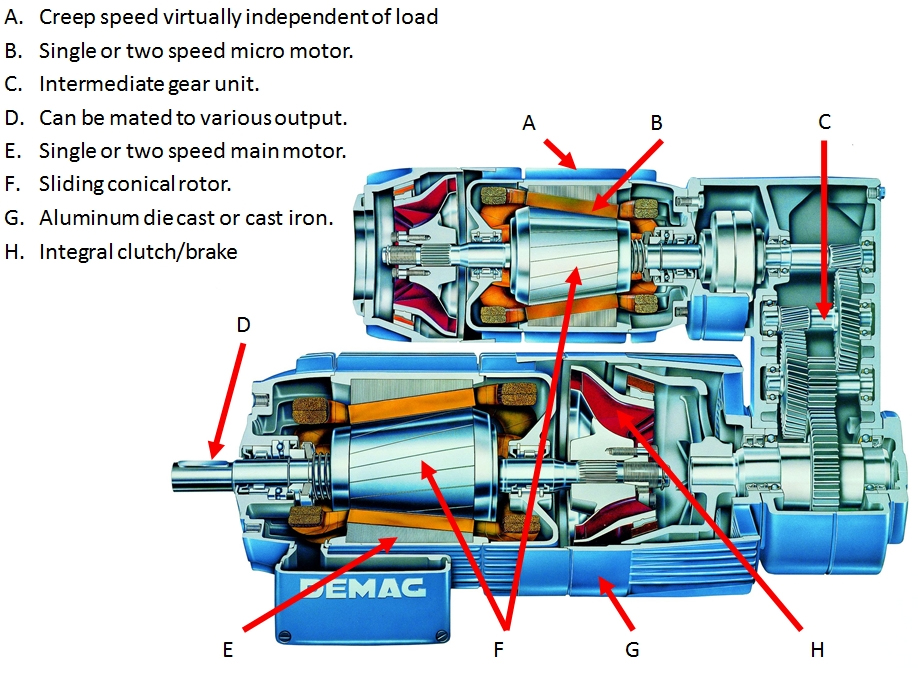
Demag sliding rotor motor concept with main motor and creep motor. This type of configuration was mostly used in hoists found on Bridge Cranes from 1925 in the "N" series hoist to present day.

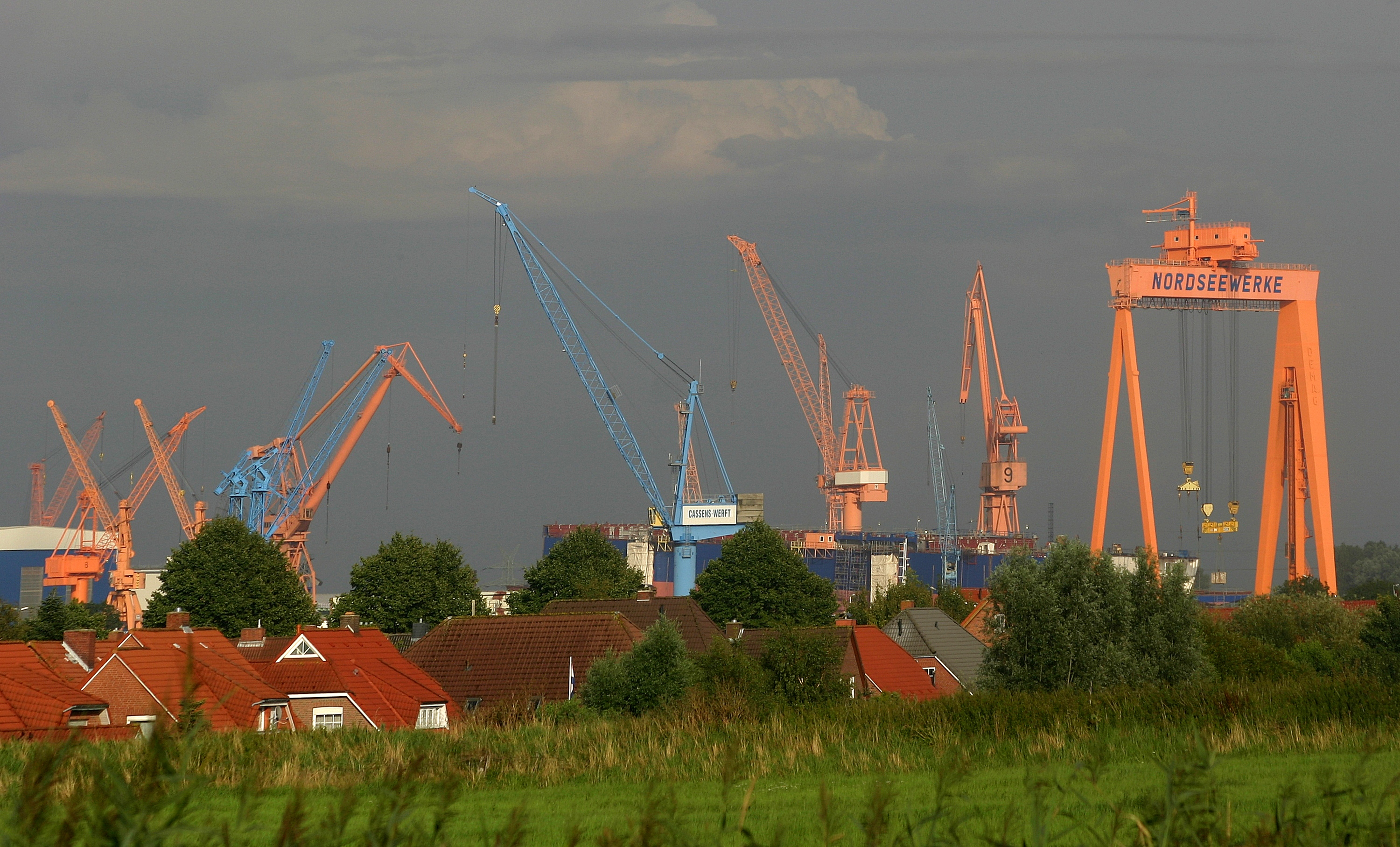
Demag gantry crane of the North Sea stations in Emden, Germany Author, Frisia Orientalis.

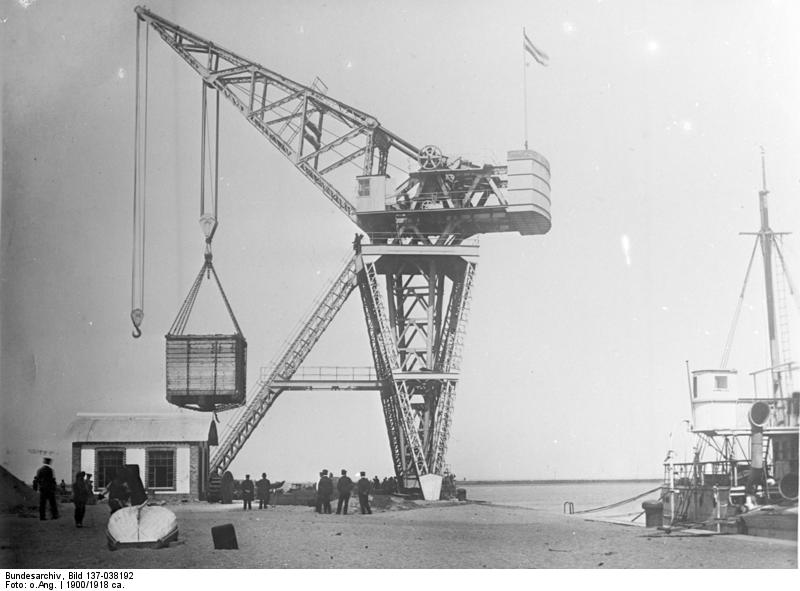
Crane located in Tsingtao China. Giant crane supplied by Demag. During the war a large blast destroyed the foundation dumping the crane in the sea, where it remained for 5 years, until the Japanese brought it up again, and repaired the systems completely.

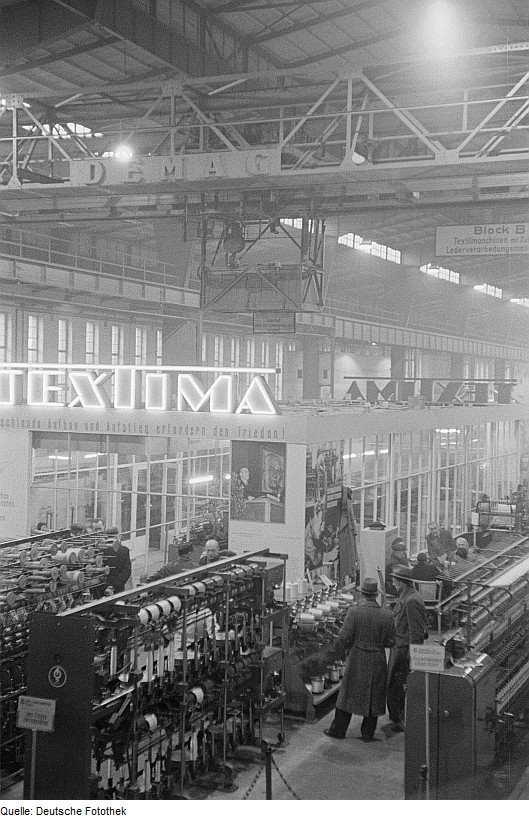
A Demag crane suspended above a factory floor handling textile machines in a company called Textima. Photographs by Roger and Renate Rössing from 1951

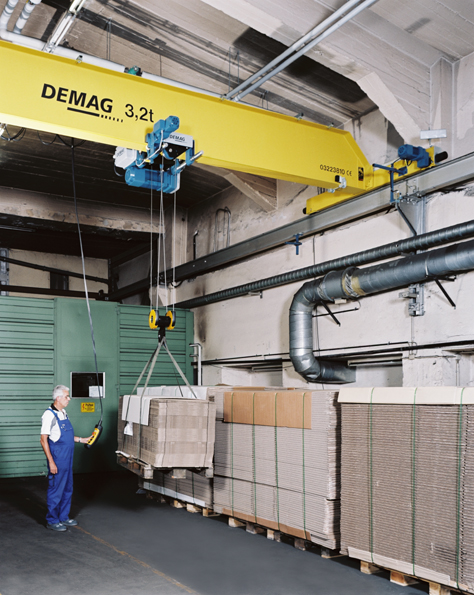
Circa 2010 Demag Overhead crane and hoist (device) being used in typical machine shop. The hoist is operated via a wired pushbutton station, known as a pendant, to move the system and the load in any direction
