= John Stedman (physician) =

Medallion of John Stedman by James Tassie, National Galleries of Scotland

John Stedman MD, FRCPE FSA Scot FRSE (1710–16 April 1791), sometimes Steadman or Steedman, was an 18th-century Scottish physician and antiquary. In 1783 he was one of the founders of the Royal Society of Edinburgh.

== Life ==
He was born in 1710 at Baldridge near Dunfermline in Fife, the son of Jean Kinnaird and Rev John Stedman (1678-1713). In 1710 the family moved to Edinburgh as his father became the minister of the Tron Kirk on the Royal Mile. His father died when he was infant. He studied medicine at the University of Edinburgh.

In 1740 he was appointed as physician to the Scots Greys, and was with the regiment at Battle of Dettingen. He then became a physician in Dunfermline before returning to Edinburgh to work at the Edinburgh Royal Infirmary on Drummond. He also served as surgeon to the Merchant Maiden Hospital. He was also an honorary professor at the University of Edinburgh, lecturing in medicine.

In 1765 he inherited Little Seggie, north-west of Milnathort from an uncle.

He lived his final years at St John Street off the Canongate in Edinburgh.

He died in Edinburgh on 16 April 1791 and is buried in the Canongate Kirkyard.

== Family ==
In 1754 he married Margaret (Peggy) Wellwood, daughter of Robert Wellwood of Pitlivie in Perthshire and Garvock in Aberdeenshire.

His elder brother was Lieutenant Colonel Robert Stedman (1701-1770).

== Publications ==
- Laelius and Hortensia
