= John Stedman =

John Stedman may refer to:

- John Andrew Stedman (1778–1833), Dutch lieutenant-general who commanded the 1st Netherlands Division during the Waterloo campaign
- John Gabriel Stedman (1744–1797), British–Dutch soldier and author
