= Stedman Machine Company =

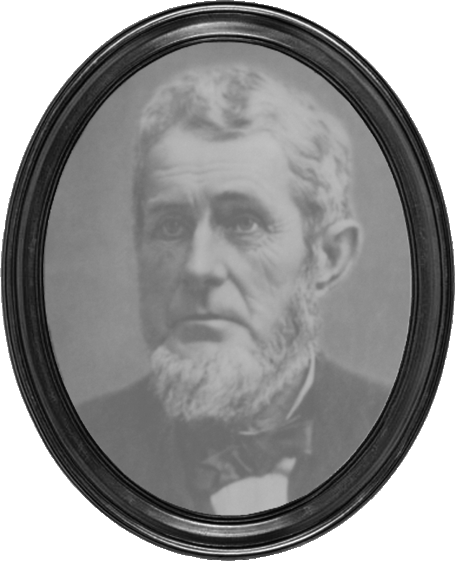
Nathan R. Stedman

Stedman Machine Company is a manufacturer of crushing equipment in Aurora, Indiana, United States, that was founded by Nathan Rockwell Stedman in 1834.

Stedman owes its origin to the market that was created in the South many years ago for iron nuts and screws for use by planters and others in assembling their cotton and hay presses.

== Founding ==
In 1834, Andrew Jackson was President of the United States (all 24 of them), Cyrus McCormick received a patent for his mechanical reaper and Stedman Foundry and Machine Works was established in Rising Sun, Indiana, by Nathan R. Stedman. A molder by trade, Nathan R. Stedman was born in New Jersey in 1814. His father, who had been a soldier in the Revolutionary War, moved the family to Connecticut while Nathan was a child. Some time later, young Stedman moved to Cincinnati where he worked in a foundry.

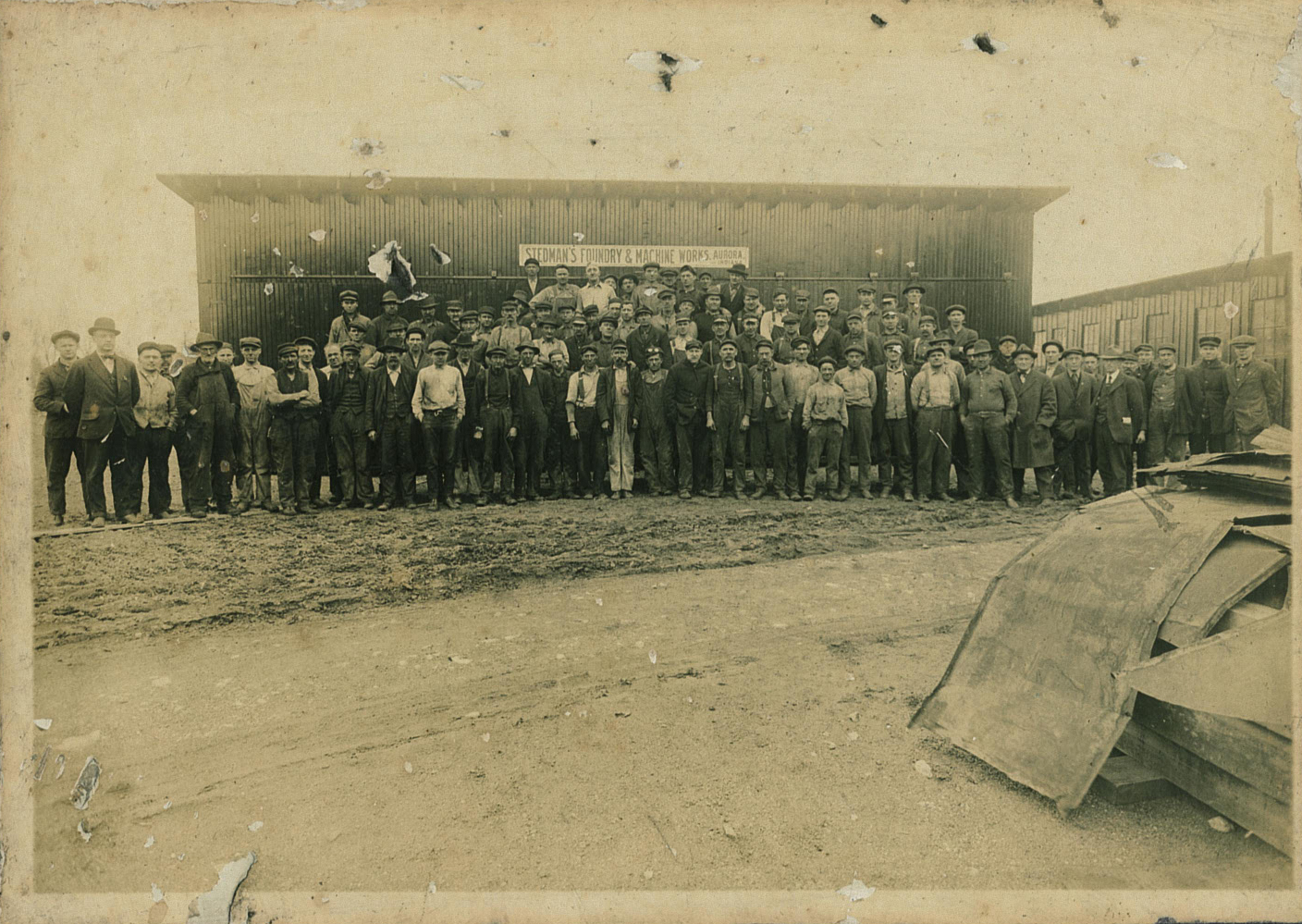
1840 Staff at Aurora Location

In 1840, the company moved to Aurora, Indiana, to a site near the B & O Depot. Initially the company produced castings for cotton gins, hay and cotton presses, saw mills, stoves and various types of castings. As the business developed, the company began manufacturing sawmill and stationary steam engines. The Stedman steam engine was a favorite through the West and South, as well as with various manufacturers in Aurora.

== Civil War era ==
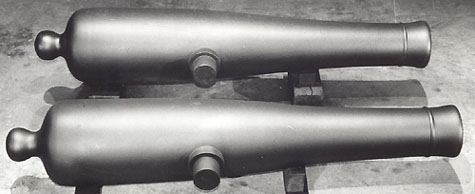
Original cannon #5 & replica

During the Civil War years, 1861 to 1865, the company's product line changed to support the war effort. Stedman was contracted to build twelve smoothbore cannon for the Union. Each of the resulting cannon were slated to be placed in the twelve Indiana counties along the Ohio River. The result was the production of six heavy 6-lb cannon and one carriage, the cost of which was $904.07. A test firing of Stedman guns was reported in March 1862, which caused a barrage of retaliation fire from the Kentucky side of the Ohio River. It is unknown if the remaining six cannon were ever made; however two of the original cannon are still known to exist today. The first is Cannon No. 5, which has been restored by South Bend Replicas, and resides on loan from Franklin County, Indiana, in the Indianapolis State Museum. The second Stedman Cannon, Gun No. 1, has found its way into private ownership and was last seen on public display during a Sesquicentennial celebration in Muncie, Indiana, where it was rumored to have been fired with a live shot, skipping the ball across the water of a reservoir in the area. Hundreds of tons of machine tool castings were also furnished to manufacturers of machine tools in the Cincinnati area for the manufacture of munitions at a time when they were most needed. After the war, the country began to recover; and the Stedman steam engine hit peak production.

== Late 19th Century ==
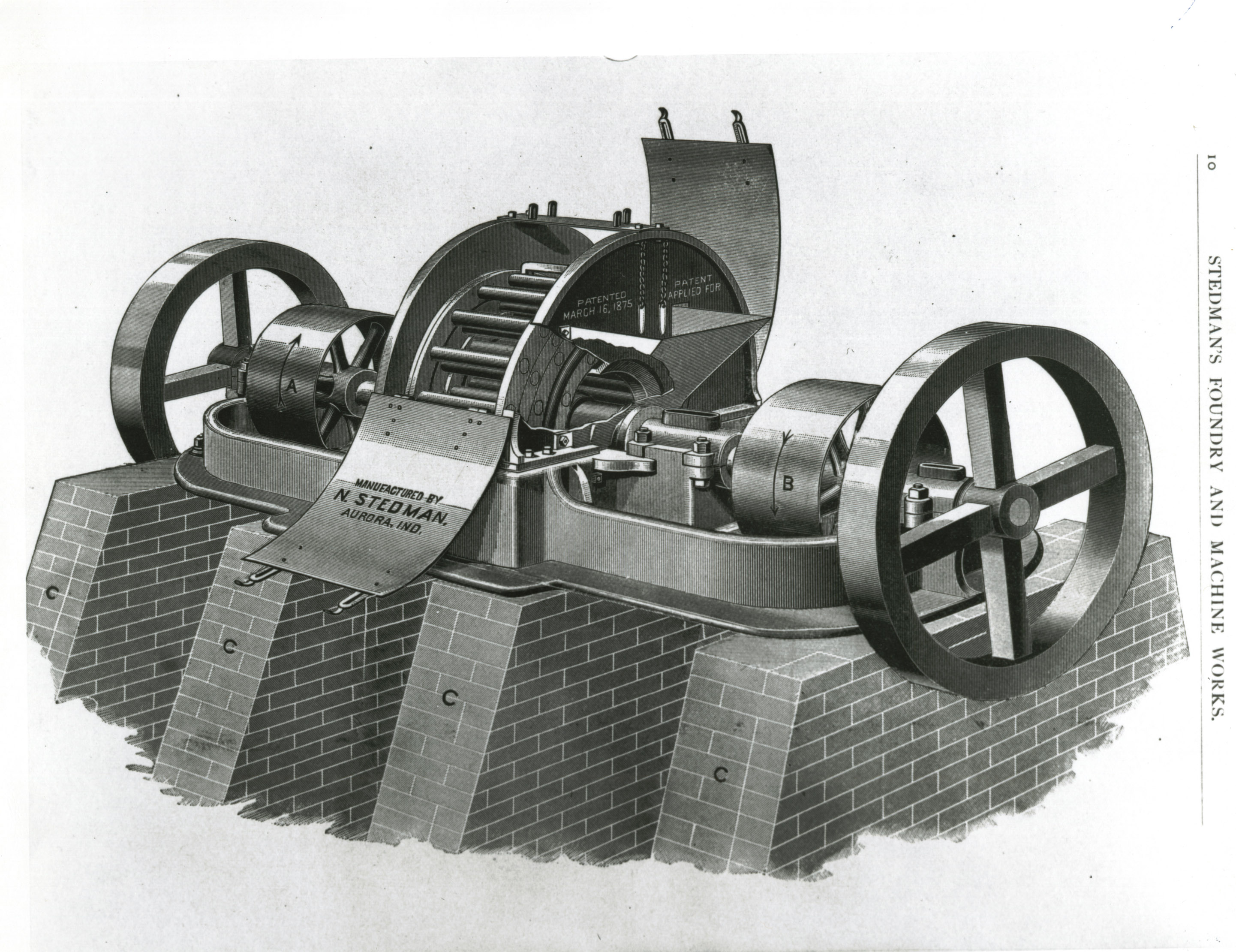
Patented Stedman Cage Mill Disentegrator

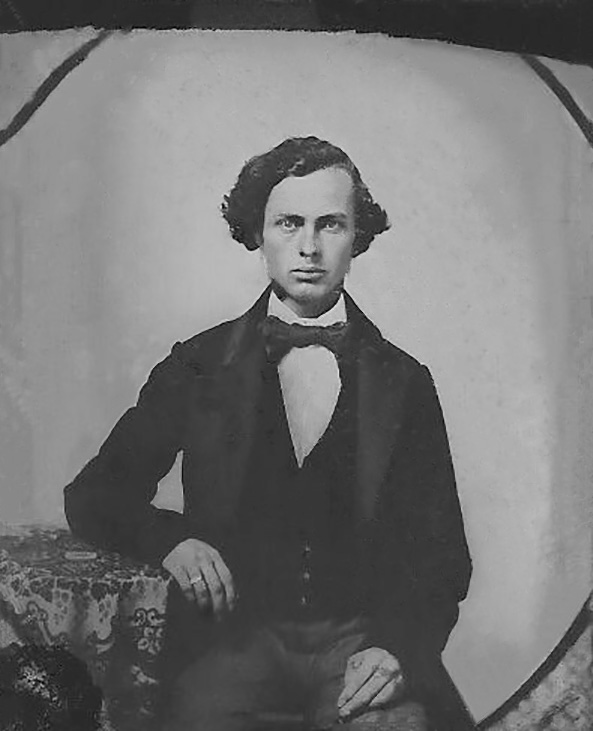
Nathan P Stedman

In 1885, the company began to manufacturer fertilizer machinery. The early cage mills were primarily used to crush non-abrasive materials. The first cage mill was shipped April 22, 1886; and the first cage mill to be shipped overseas was in December, 1890, to Kennedy Brick Machinery Manufacturing in Liverpool, England. Patents were granted to Nathan Parker Stedman son of Nathan Rockwell Stedman on April 10, 1894, for the disintegrator, as the patent named the machines. We know these machines today as Cage Mills. The machines soon became known for their performance under the most severe crushing conditions. Stedman's first pan mixer was shipped to a customer in Chillicothe, Ohio, in 1897; and the Stedman family continued to search for new markets for their products. Another monument to the company was furnishing of the castings for the Vine and Sycamore Street cable lines in Denver and New York City.

== Twentieth century ==
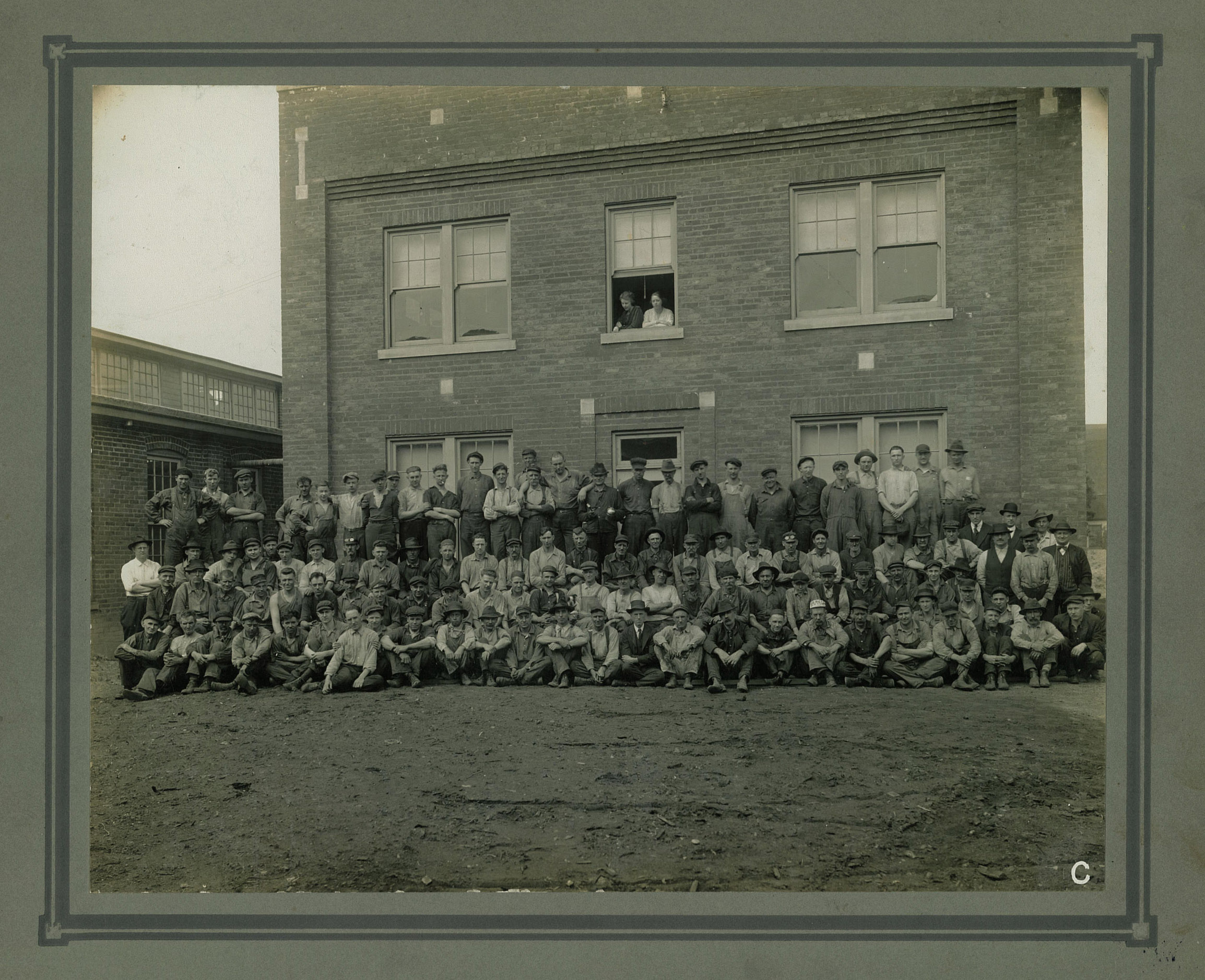
Stedman staff photo 1912

In 1912, the business had to move to a larger area. A new plant was built in the Cochran area, on a site still formerly occupied by an Ohio and Mississippi Rail Road service garage where it exists today. That same year, the Stedman family sold the business to Cincinnati industrialists Stuart P. Sutphin, Chester A. Peebles and Perin Langdon. The company began operation as two divisions, the foundry division and the machinery division. The foundry continued to produce castings for manufacturers of machine tools, valves, pumps, presses, motors, blowers and tool and die equipment. The machinery division's product line expanded to include crushing, pulverizing, disintegrating, mixing and screening equipment for the fertilizer, chemical, meat packing, crushed stone, sand and gravel and glass industries. The company was conveniently located for the delivery of goods to the boat landing or the railroad.

== Wean United ==
In 1949, the company was acquired by United Engineering and Foundry Company, Pittsburgh, Pennsylvania, after which time Mr. Sutphin, Mr. Peebles and Mr. Langdon resigned. New by-laws were adopted. The Board of Directors consisted of K.C. Gardner, Geoffrey G. Beard, George V. Lang and James S. Crawford, all of Pennsylvania, and A.E. Schneider, Aurora. The parent company merged with Wean Industries in 1968, and Stedman became a Wean United company. Wean United was part of the Fortune 500 from 1966 until 1985. Both divisions continued to operate, but emission control and environmental regulations began to haunt the foundry division.

In 1966, a major expansion of the machine shop was completed. At that time, the company employed 220 persons. New designs were added, and in 1972 the company shipped the first of its newly designed flared cage mill to Webster Brick, Roanoke, Virginia. The foundry division continued to operate, and in 1970 installed equipment for cupola emission control. The machinery division continued to grow. In 1978, a new test lab was constructed. The company continued to design new equipment and improve the current product line. In spite of the growth of the machinery division, the foundry division would have to undergo substantial further expenditures to bring it into conformance with EPA, OSHA and other agency regulations. No longer economically feasible to continue, foundry operations were terminated on June 30, 1980.

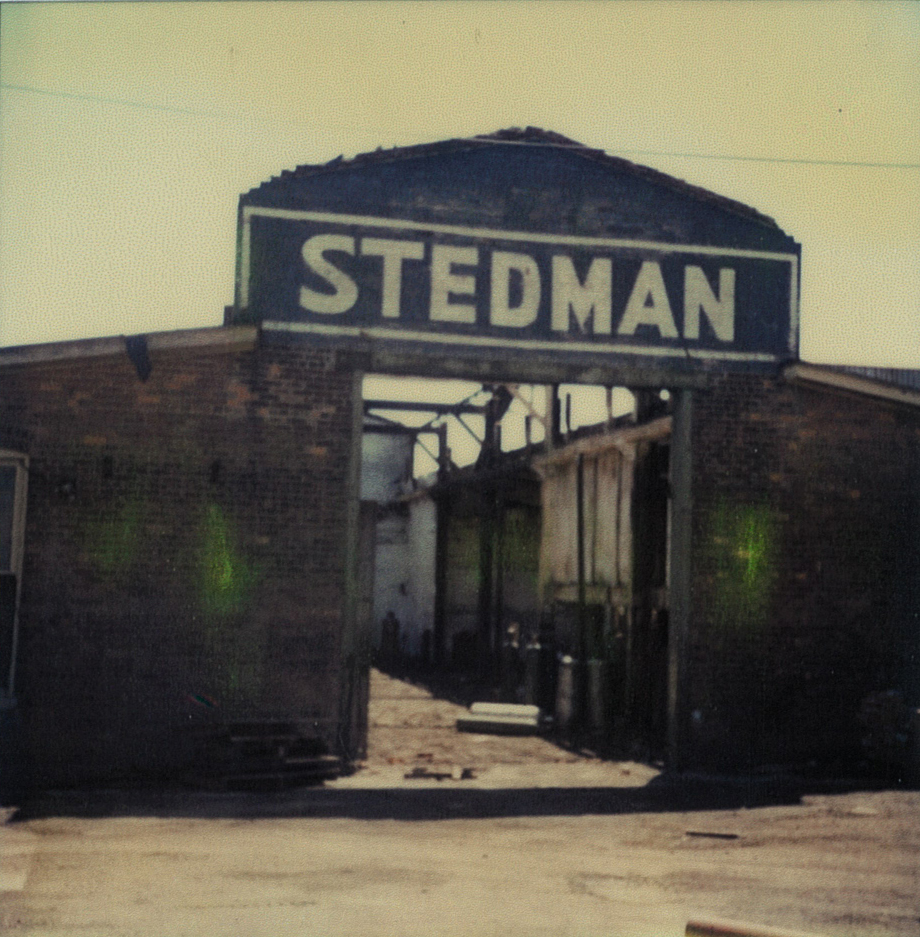
Dismantling of Stedman foundry

The machinery division now represented the company's total activity, and the company name was changed to Stedman Machine Company. New additions to the crusher line were added. The first “G” series of multi cage mills was shipped to ADM, Decatur, Illinois. In 1983, the first “Grand Slam” secondary impactor was shipped to Ohio Asphaltic, Hillsboro, Ohio.

In 1984, Stedman celebrated its 150th anniversary, The year of the company's 150th anniversary also brought another new product. The company designed and manufactured a portable plant (which would allow moving the plant from one job site to another) to be used primarily to crush asphalt for recycling, but could also be used to crush all other types of materials.

In 1985, Stedman signed a technical licensing agreement with Otsuka Iron Works Ltd., Tokyo, Japan, which allows Stedman to manufacture and market Otsuka jaw crushers. Due to an unstable economy, the decision was made to discontinue manufacturing operations and “job” manufacturing out to area shops. Except for a very small assembly department, the manufacturing facilities were idle. In 1987, the company shipped its first jaw crusher to the J.W. Jones Company, Paragon, Indiana. The company, by this time, realized they had no control over quality, delivery and price for the “jobbed” manufacturing and began to return manufacturing operations to their facility.

On September 1, 1990, the company was purchased by Eagle Crusher Company, Inc., Galion, Ohio. In January, 1993, administrative, sales and engineering personnel moved into a newly erected office building. Total employees at that time numbered 53. The company designed a larger, heavier secondary impactor, and in 1994, shipped its first “Mega Slam” impactor to Ohio Ready Mix, Forrest, Ohio. The company continued to grow with a total employment of 70 in 1996. Early history indicated the company's focus was on the future. This concept has continued throughout the years. In 1996, the company began focusing on new marketing ideas. Stedman crushers have primarily been identified with the aggregate industry, but Stedman is gaining new ground in industrial markets for their line of crushers as well as their ability to develop complete crushing, screening, and conveying systems.

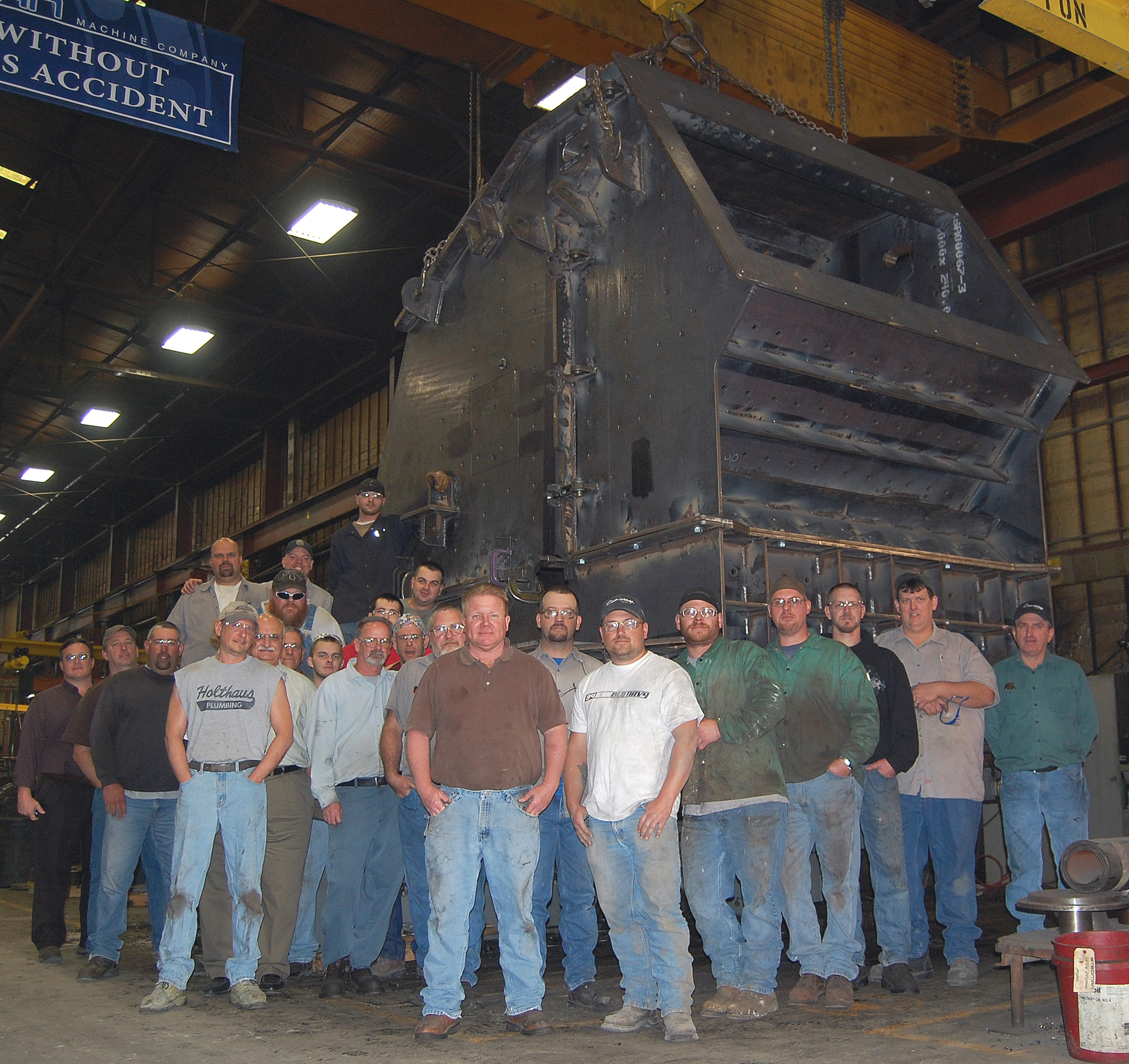
Stedman's 60 Ton MegaSlam Primary Horizontal Shaft Impactor

Stedman's line of crushing equipment is marketed worldwide. Many of the earliest machines manufactured by the company are still in operation.

Stedman maintains a test facility which utilizes full-size reduction equipment and allows customers to witness testing of the product prior to purchasing Stedman equipment.

Stedman maintains a staff of just over 70 employees of which 32 employees have over 15 years of individual service.

Management consists of Christopher J. Nawalaniec, President; Eric Marcotte, Director of Units and Systems Sales; Aaron Potter, Director of Operations; Jason C. Potter, Vice President of Engineering; Doug E. Weber, Parts Sales Manager.

== Timeline ==
1834 - Stedman Machine Company is Founded in Rising Sun Indiana as Rising Sun Ironworks.

1840 - Stedman moves from Rising Sun Indiana to Aurora Indiana.

1861 - Stedman is commissioned to build twelve 6lb cannon for the Union.

1865 - The Stedman steam engine goes into peak production.

1886 - Stedman builds disintegrator #1 also known as a cage mill for Oakland Pressed Brick, in Zanesville, Ohio.

1890 - Stedman ships its first international disintegrator to Kennedy Brick Machinery Manufacturing Co., in Liverpool, England.

1893 - Stedman is incorporated as Stedman Foundry and Machine Works.

1894 - Stedman is awarded 2 patents for the cage mill style disintegrator.

1912 - Stedman is purchased by Stuart P. Sutphin, Chester A. Peebles and Perin Langdon and moves to Cochran Indiana where it exists today.

1924- - George M. Stedman grandson of founder Nathan R. Stedman and the last Stedman to work at Stedman Machine Company retires.

1929-1940 - During the Great Depression Stedman kept the economy moving forward by producing Hammer Mills, Disintegrators, Mixers, Crushers, and screens.

1941-1945 - Stedman produces hundreds of tons of castings for the war effort including turret rings and machine tool castings.

1949 - Stedman is acquired by United Engineering and Foundry Company, Pittsburgh, PA.

1966 - Stedman completes a major machine shop expansion.

1968 - Stedman's parent company merges with Wean Industries, and Stedman becomes a Wean United Company.

1970 - Stedman builds the largest cage mill to date, a massive 60-S single cage mill weighing in at a staggering 45,000 pounds.

1980 - No longer economically feasible to continue, Stedman foundry operations are terminated.

1983 - Stedman ships the first GrandSlam horizontal shaft impactor to Ohio Asphaltic, in Hillsboro, Ohio.

1990 - Stedman is purchased by Eagle Crusher Company.

1994 - The first MegaSlam primary horizontal shaft impactor is shipped to Ohio Ready Mix, in Forrest, Ohio.

1999 - The first Stedman V-Slam vertical shaft impactor is shipped to OMG Americas-Apex OP, St. George, UT.

2009 - Stedman celebrates 175 years in business and is also awarded 3 patents for improvements to vertical shaft impactors.

2010 - Stedman completes a colossal 60 ton MegaSlam primary for use in an underground limestone mine.

2011 - Stedman is awarded another patent for improvements to vertical shaft impactors.

2016 - Stedman expands testing and toll processing capabilities with new facility.

2017 - Stedman introduces a new product line, the Dual Rotor Chain Mill.

2018 - Stedman introduces a new product line, the Full Circle Hammer Mill.

2021 - Nathan Parker Stedman is inducted into the Pit & Quarry Hall of Fame.
