= DeGrazia Gallery in the Sun Historic District =

Art museum in Tucson, Arizona

Coordinates: 32°19′20″N 110°53′30″W

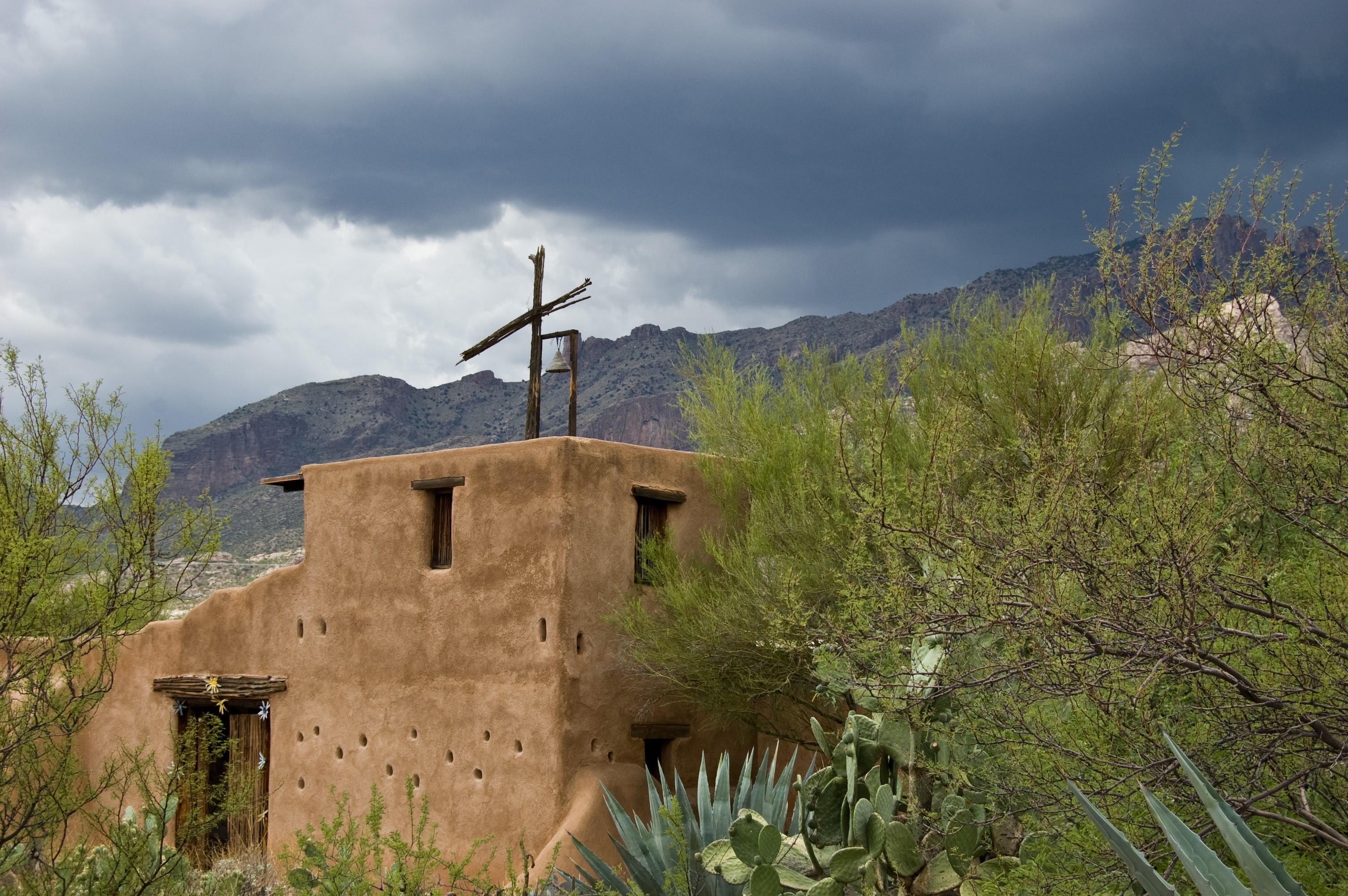
Chapel at DeGrazia Gallery in the Sun

DeGrazia Gallery in the Sun Historic District is the artistic manifestation and architecture constructed by Ettore DeGrazia. The property is a series of buildings scattered throughout a natural desert setting. Built in Tucson near the intersection of Swan Road and Skyline the property is now a museum open to the public. Construction began in 1951 with the open air Mission in the Sun followed by a series of other expressionistic adobe buildings. The gallery/museum was constructed in 1965 with details including cactus flooring, exposed wood beams, rafters and unique artistic finishes.

The gallery replaced the first DeGrazia Building constructed in 1944 on the corner of Prince and Campbell Road. Artists and friends who spent time at the new gallery included Thomas Hart Benton, Olaf Wieghorst, Jack Van Ryder, Pete Martinez and Ross Santee. In 2006, the 10-acre (40,000 m^{2}) property, now a museum of DeGrazia's work, was listed on the National Register of Historic Places.

The first building on the site, The Mission in the Sun was dedicated to Our Lady of Guadalupe and to the memory of Padre Eusebio Kino. DeGrazia hand painted every wall with murals and included a large painting of Our Lady of Guadalupe at the brick altar. Visitors have used the Mission as their own spiritual site often leaving photos, candles and other mementos. The Mission has also hosted many weddings throughout the years. On May 30, 2017 a fire heavily damaged the Mission. At the time of the fire there were no hanging pictures by DeGrazia inside the chapel, but walls, murals and the roof were damaged. Conservators began work to salvage and restore some of the artifacts. The walls were plastered over to secure what remained of the original murals, 80% of which were destroyed. One of the conservators is an artist personally mentored by DeGrazia. The restored chapel reopened to the public in the fall of 2019. Some of the fire damage was intentionally retained.

== Buildings ==
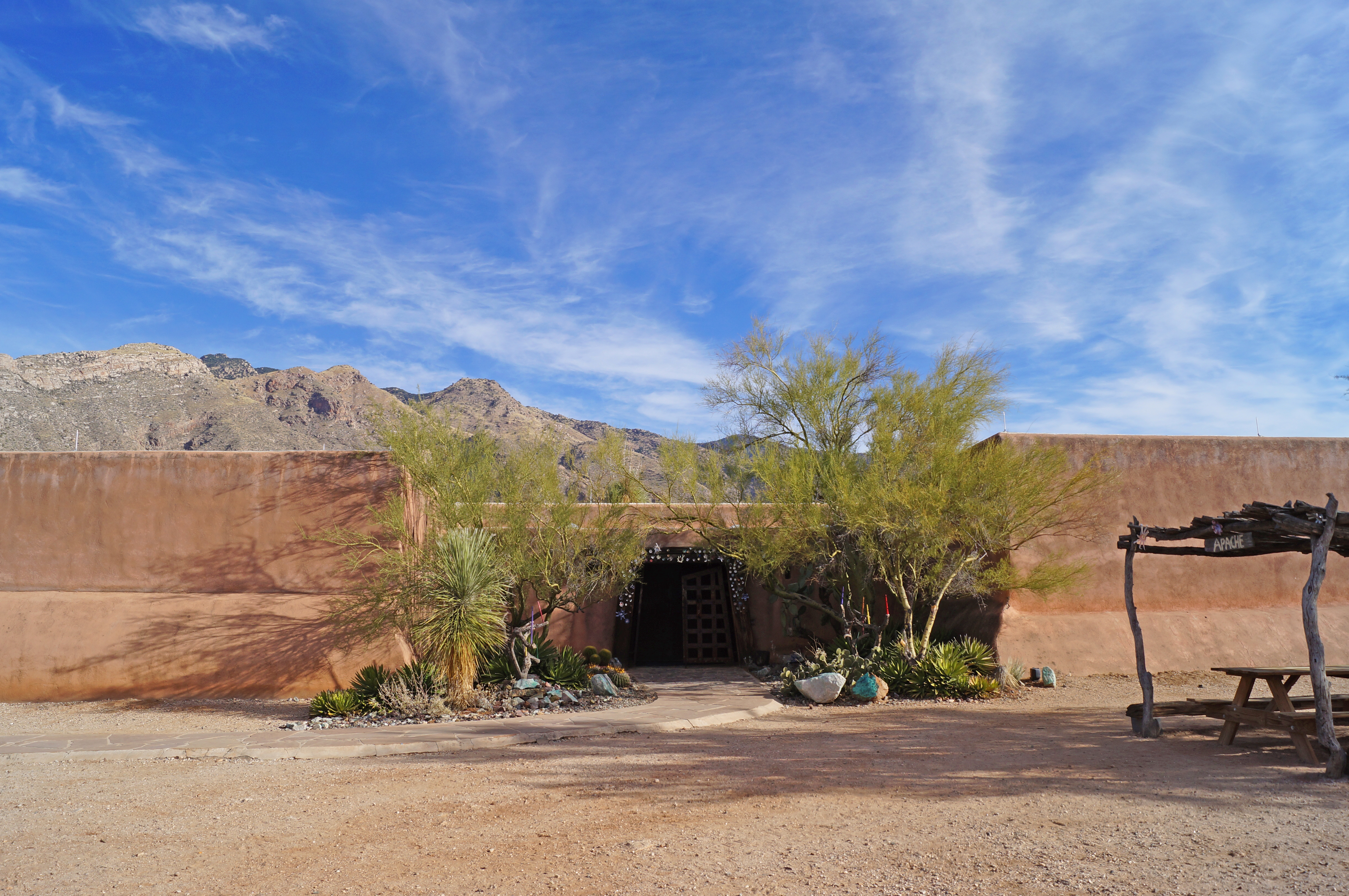
Front Exterior of the Gallery In the Sun

- Mission in the Sun 1952
- DeGrazia House 1952
- Island House 1954 (demolished)
- Ceramics Studio 1954
- Brian's House 1955
- Ghost House 1956
- Gate House 1960
- Gallery in the Sun 1965
- Garage 1966
- Nun's house 1968
- Underground House 1969
- Apartment 1972
- DeGrazia Grave 1982

== Images ==
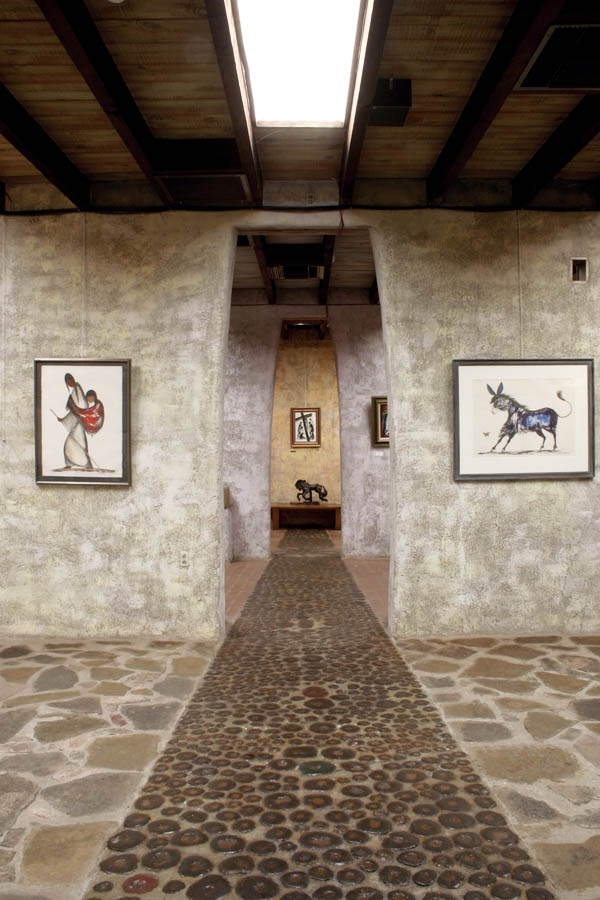
Cholla Walkway

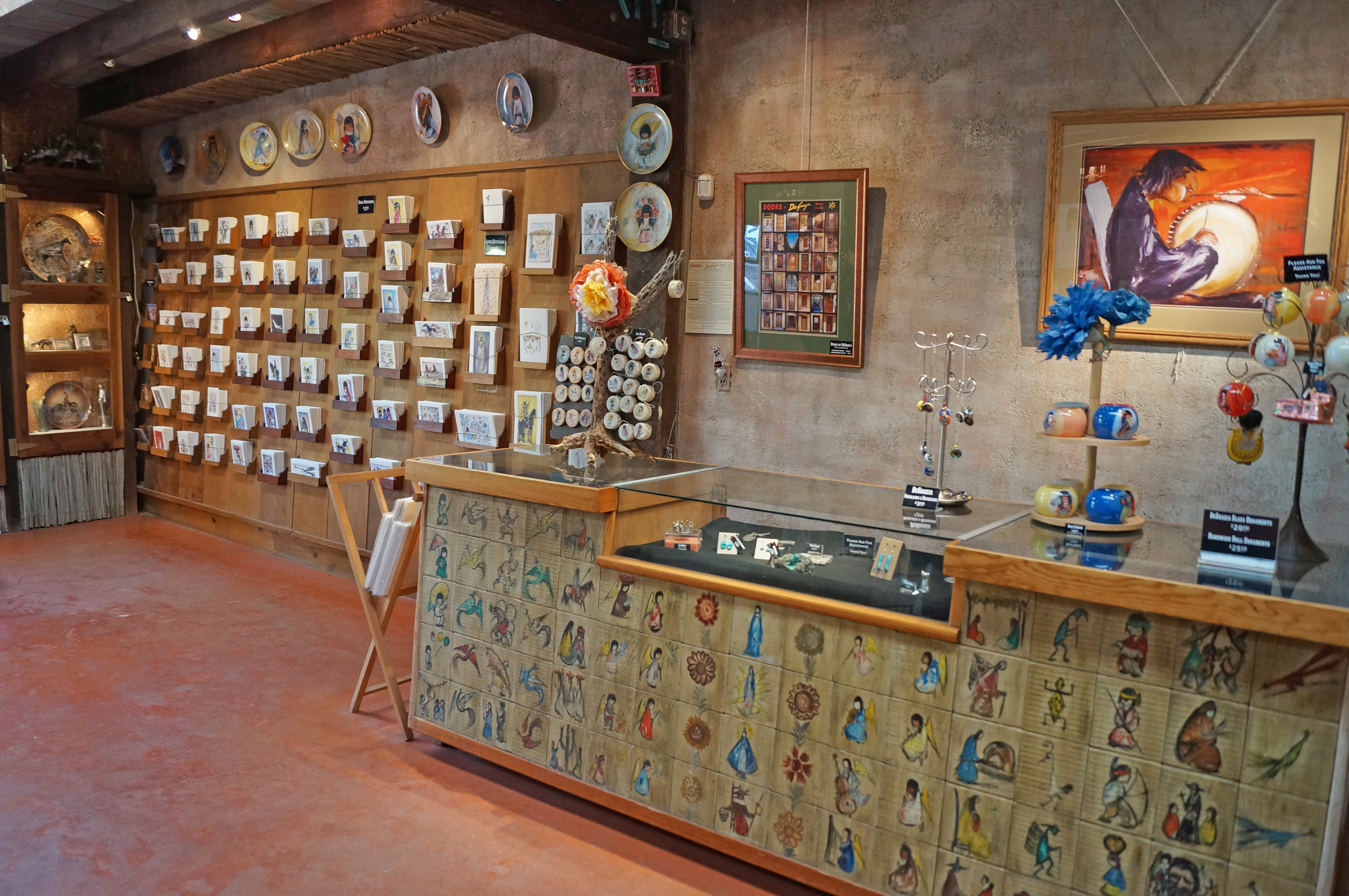
Gallery In the Sun gift shop

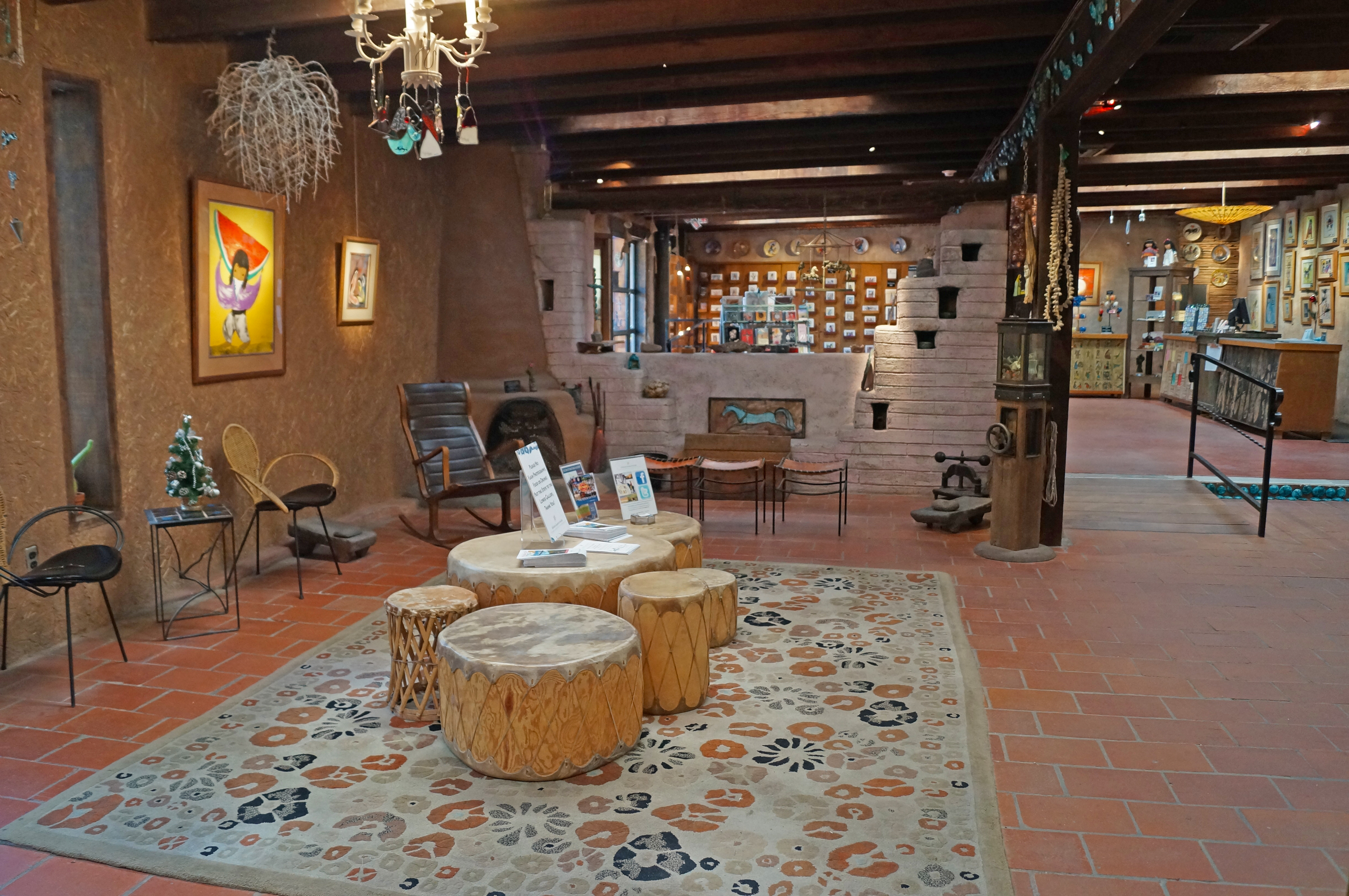
Interior of the Gallery In the Sun

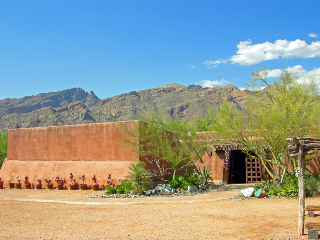
DeGrazia Gallery in the Sun

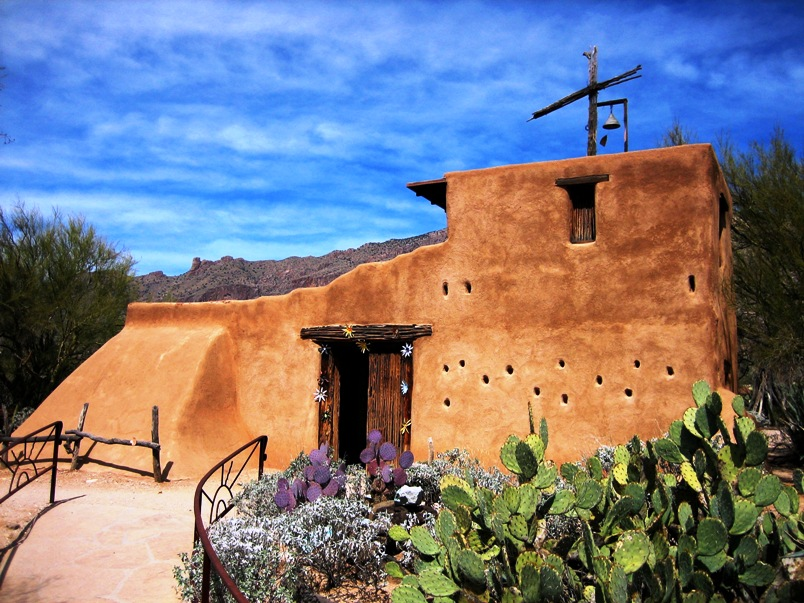
DeGrazia Mission

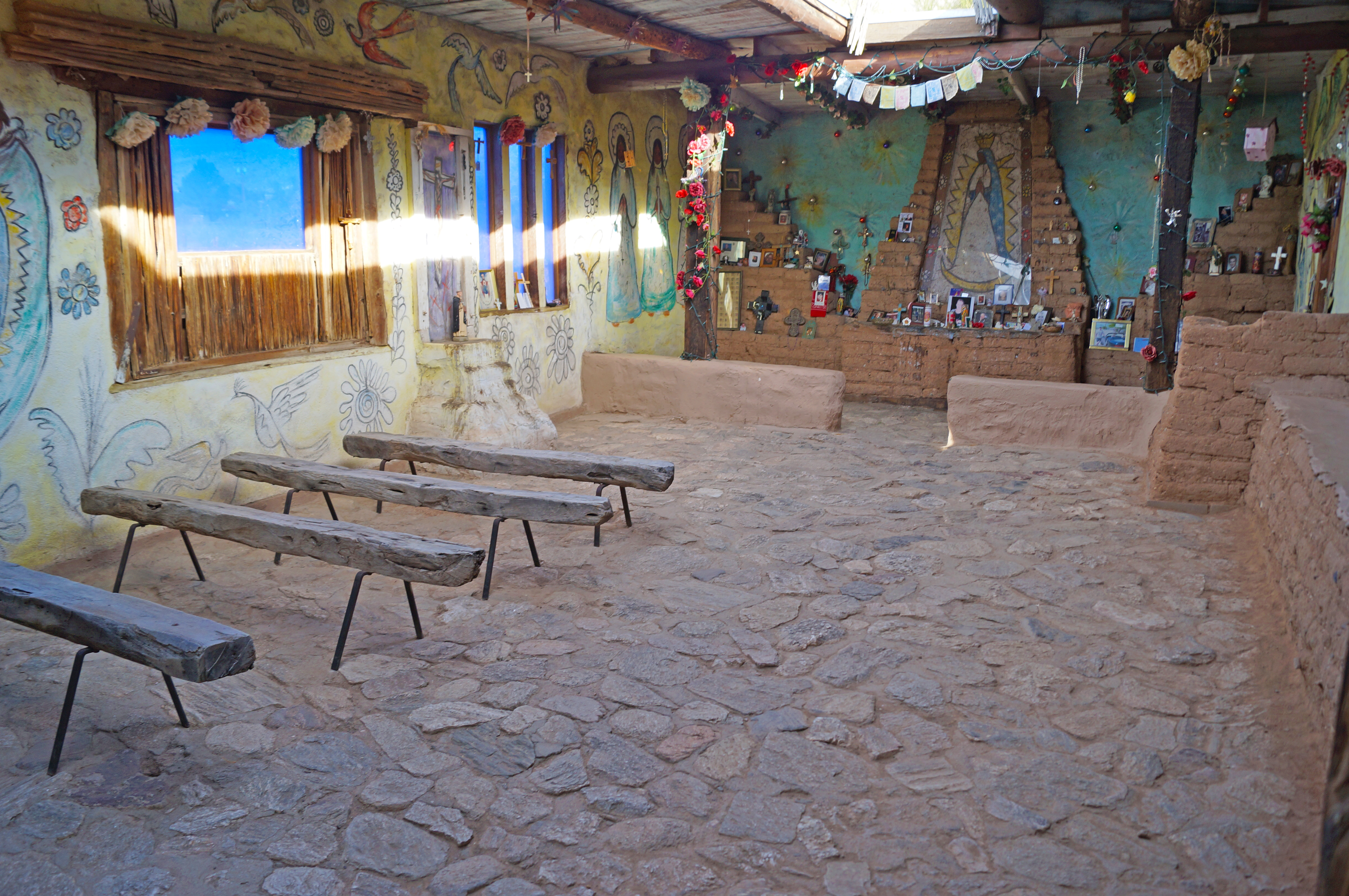
Interior of Mission In the Sun (damaged in 2017 fire)

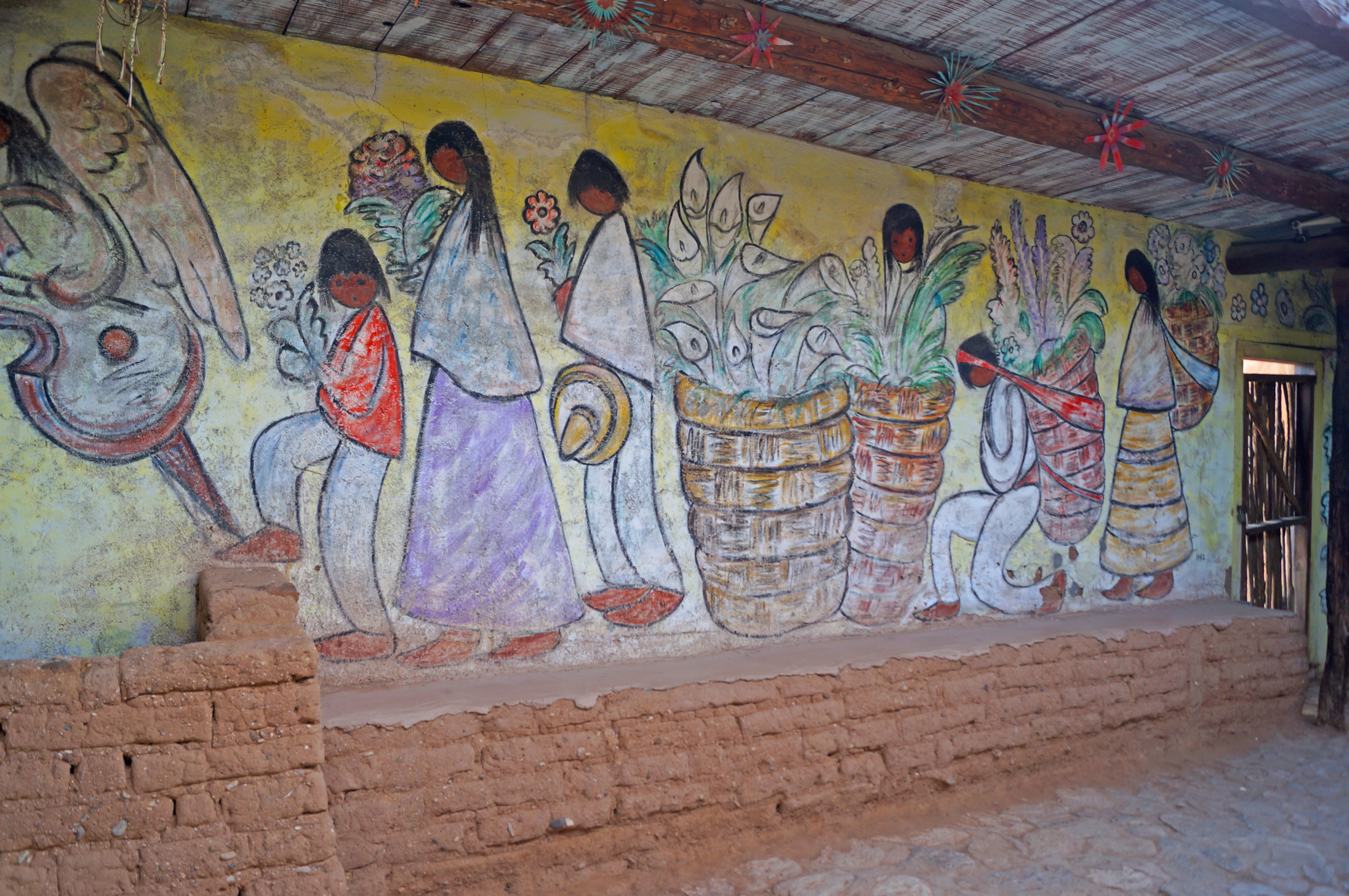
Chapel Mural (damaged in 2017 fire)

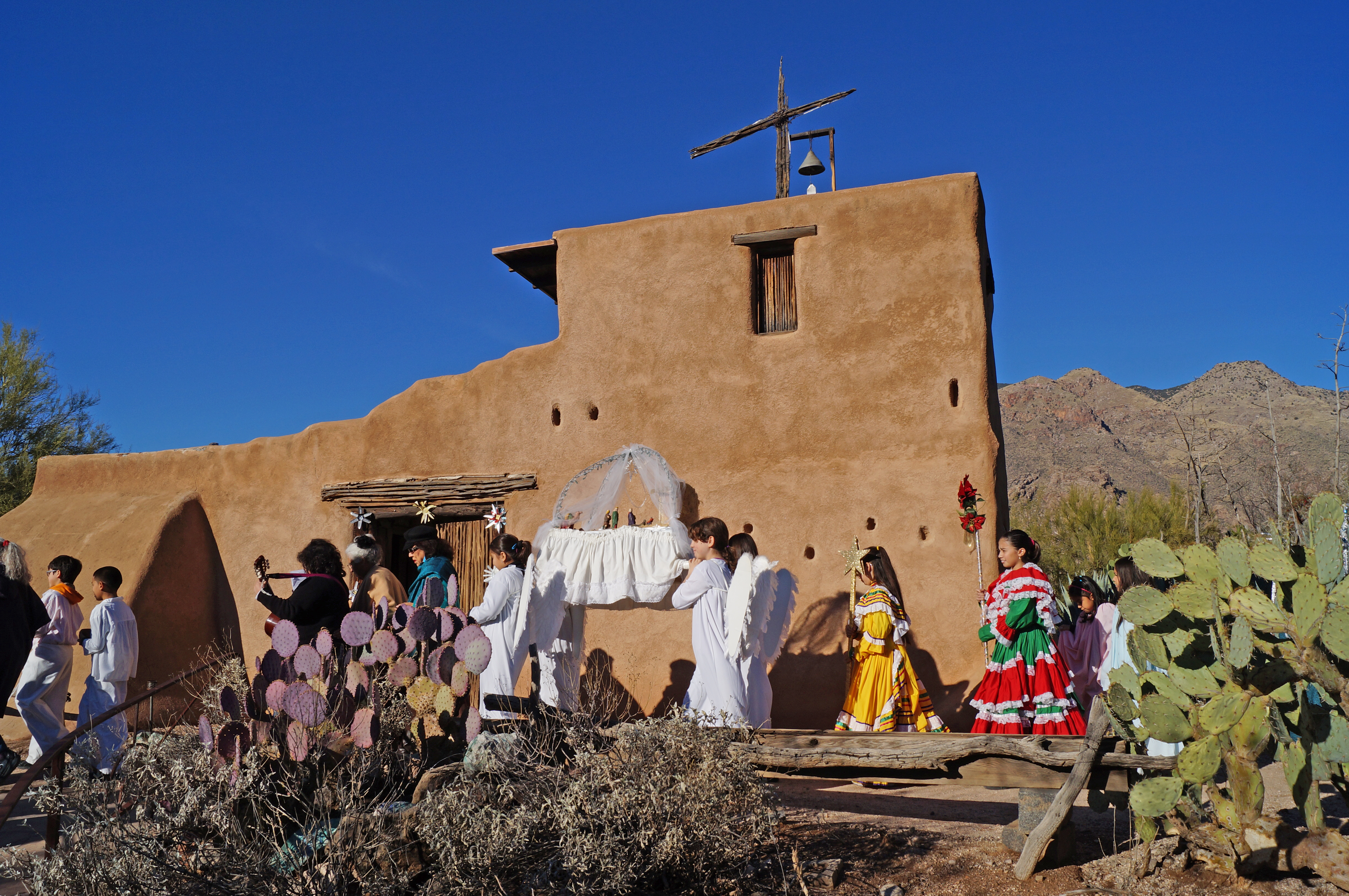
Festivities at the Mission In the Sun

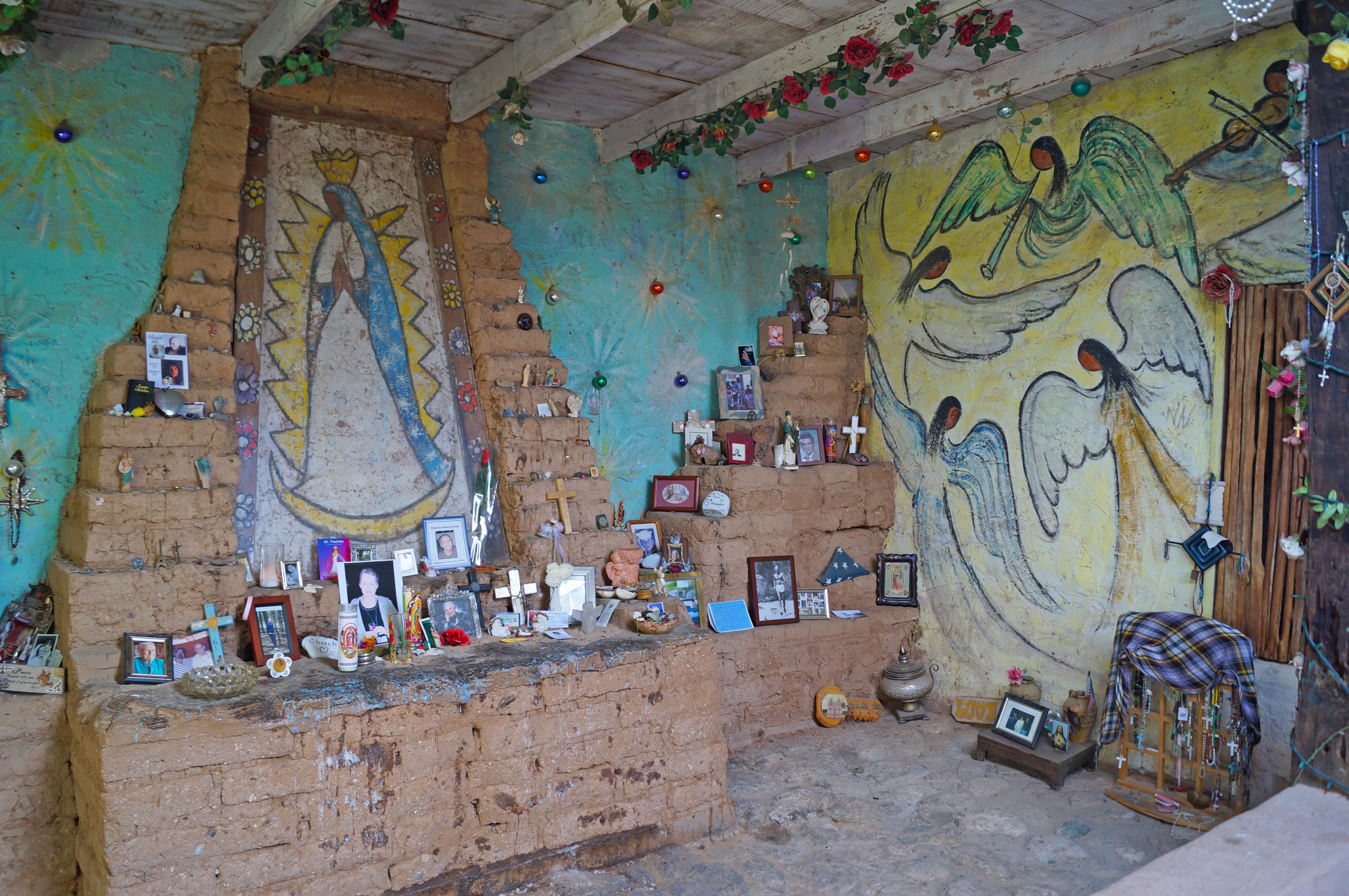
Interior of Chapel and Altar (damaged in 2017 fire)

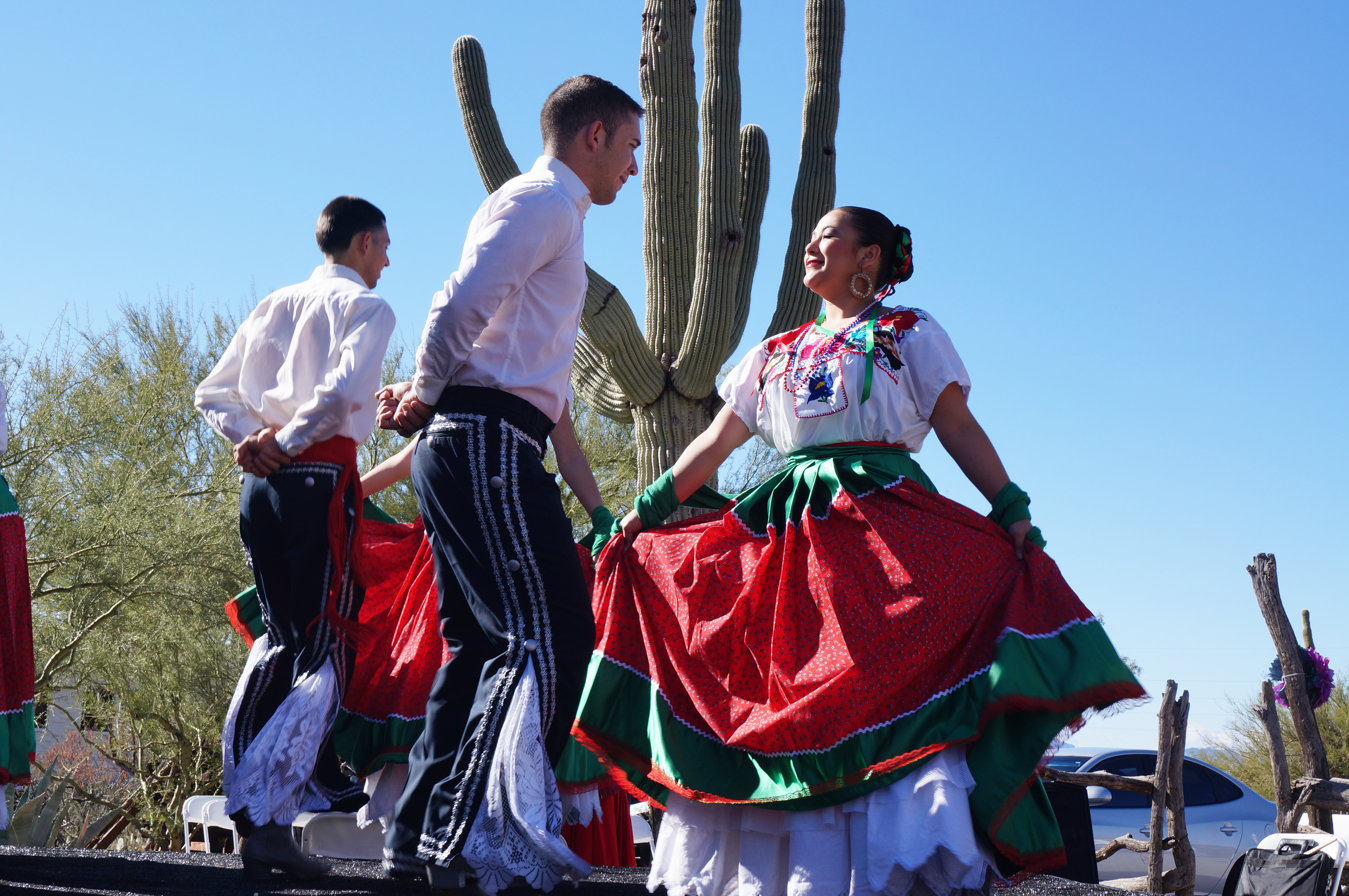
Festivities at the Gallery In the Sun

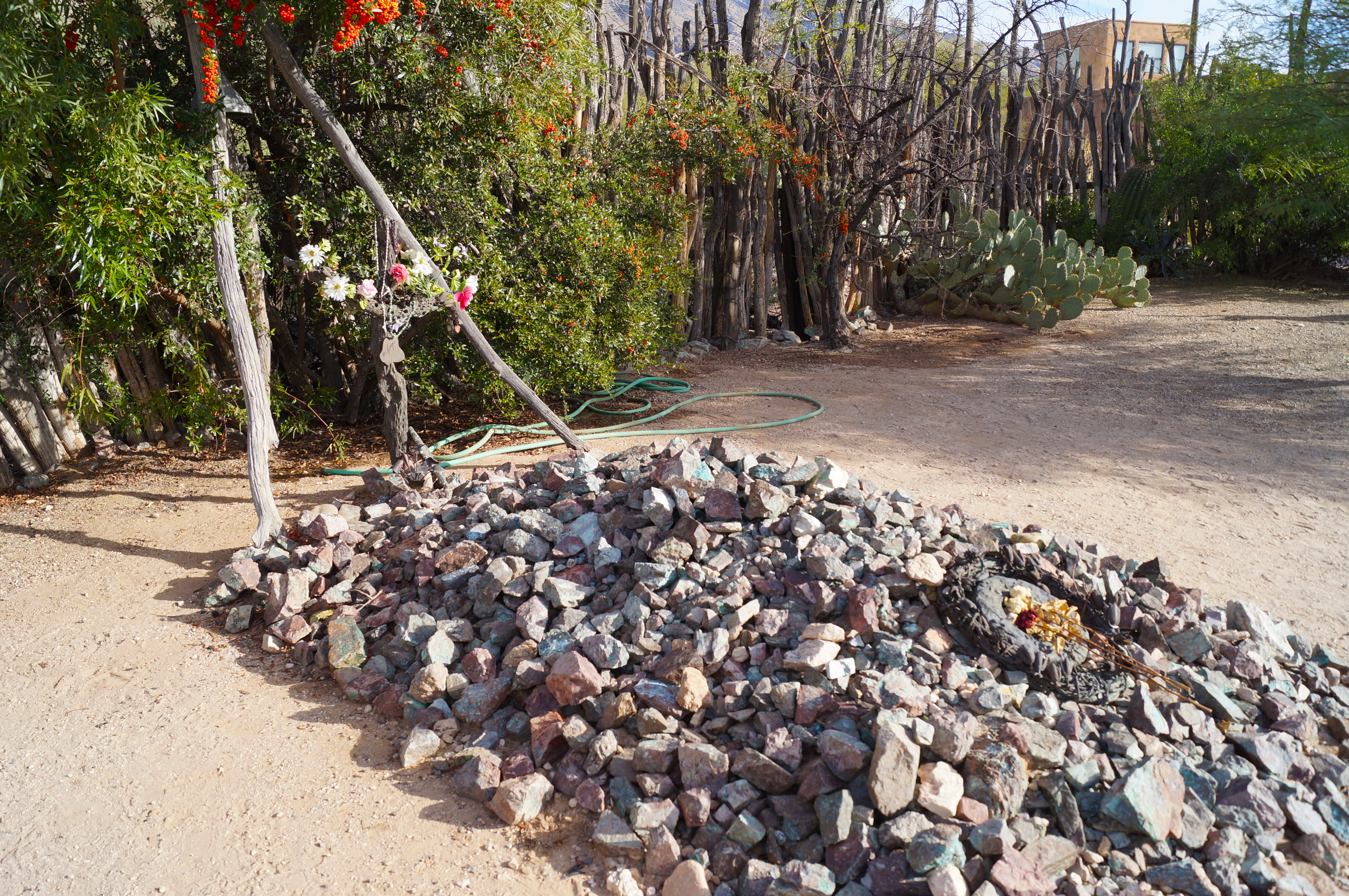
DeGrazia's Grave

== Bibliography ==
- Adams, Margaret, Artist DeGrazia Built His Own Empire, Arizona Wildcat, December 17, 1962.
- Clinco, Demion, DeGrazia Gallery in the Sun National Register of Historic Places Nomination, 2006.
- Buildings of Architectural Significance in Tucson, The American Institute of Architects, building number three. October 1960.
- Hermit Artist Builds Own Mission, National Geographic Magazine, September 1953, pp350.
- Cardon, Charlotte, “DeGrazia Creates His Own Environment.” The Arizona Daily Star, October 1964.
