= Ettore DeGrazia =

American artist (1909–1982)

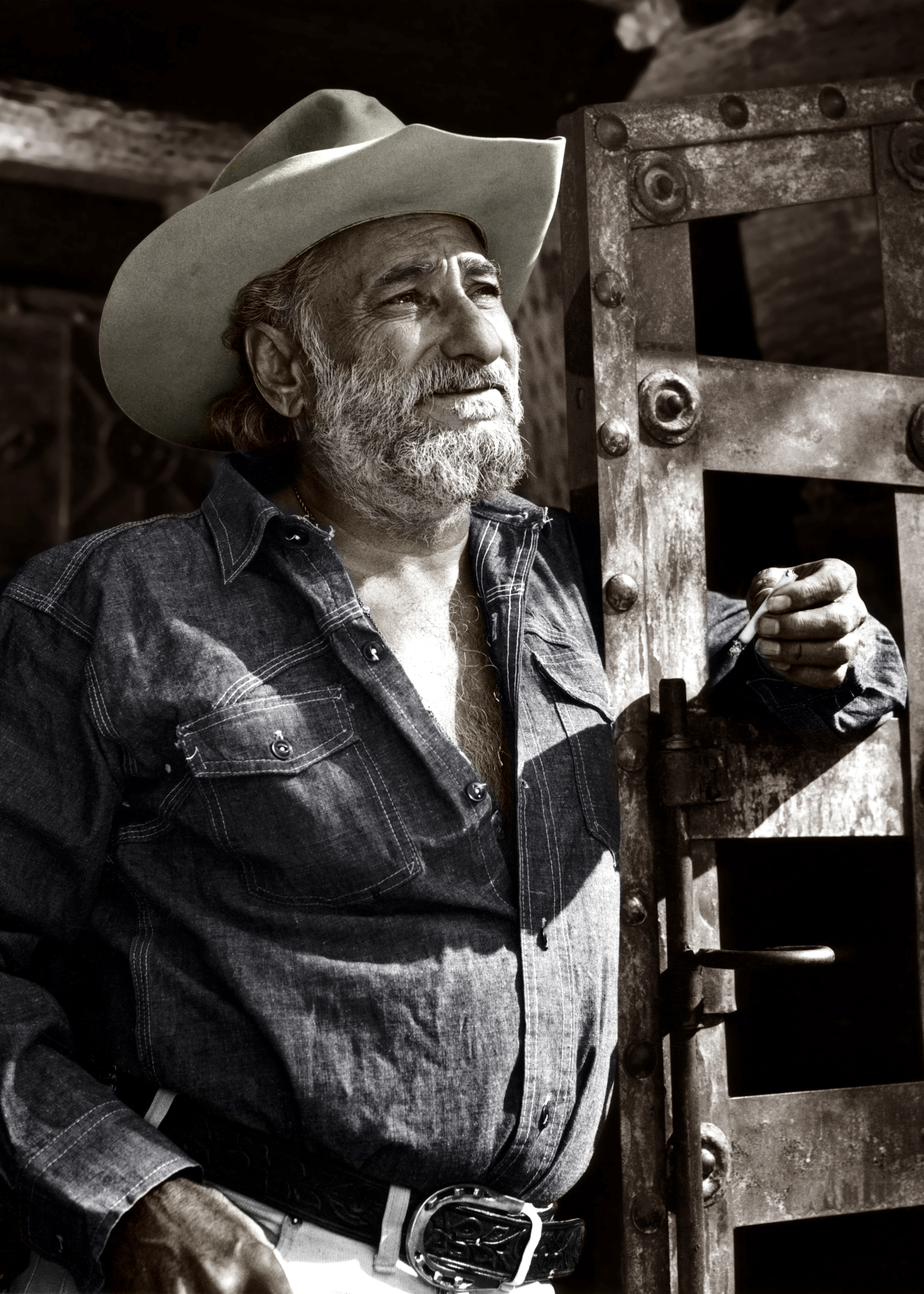
- Born: Ettorino DeGrazia; June 14, 1909; Morenci, Arizona Territory
- Died: September 17, 1982 (aged 73)
- Other names: Theodore DeGrazia, Ted DeGrazia
- Spouses: Alexandra (div. 1946) Marion Sheret (m. 1947)
- Children: Domingo DeGrazia
- Website: www.degrazia.org

Ettore "Ted" DeGrazia (June 14, 1909 – September 17, 1982) was an American impressionist, painter, sculptor, composer, actor, director, designer, architect, jeweler, and lithographer. Described as "the world's most reproduced artist," DeGrazia is known for his colorful images of Native American children of the American Southwest and other Western scenes. DeGrazia also painted several series of exhibitions like the Papago Legends, Padre Kino, Cabeza de Vaca.

== Childhood ==
Ettore DeGrazia was born to Italian immigrants, on June 14, 1909, in Morenci, Arizona Territory (later the state of Arizona in 1912). The DeGrazia's family immigrated from the Province of Cosenza. His father, Salvatore Domenico De Grazia was born in Lago, and his mother Lucia Gagliardi was born in San Pietro in Amantea. They were strong people who worked very hard for their family of seven children. His father and uncles were copper miners in Morenci.

DeGrazia's graduation from Morenci High School was delayed until the age of 23. The family moved back to Italy in 1920. The move was a result of the Morenci Mines closing that same year. DeGrazia's father took his family to the only home they had – Italy.

The family moved back to America in 1925 when the Morenci mines reopened. This is when DeGrazia paints his very first painting: 'Indian Faces.' It was a crude, cracked canvas piece, which DeGrazia admitted was not very good. In primary school, his teachers had trouble pronouncing his name, Ettore, so they nicknamed him Ted. He has been called that ever since. Because of the move to Italy, DeGrazia had forgotten how to speak English and as a result, he was put in first grade at the age of sixteen. He had to work his way through elementary school, Junior high, and high school. After graduation in 1932, DeGrazia worked the mines with his family. It was then he realized he did not want to live life as a miner. He said that he couldn't live without the sun light – and in the early mining days of Morenci there was no open pit mine. The miners went underground before the sun rose, and came out when the sun went down.

"I had a full beard and was twenty-three when I graduated from high school, into a world hit by the depression. I knew I would be underground all of my life if I didn't succeed at something else."

early life images

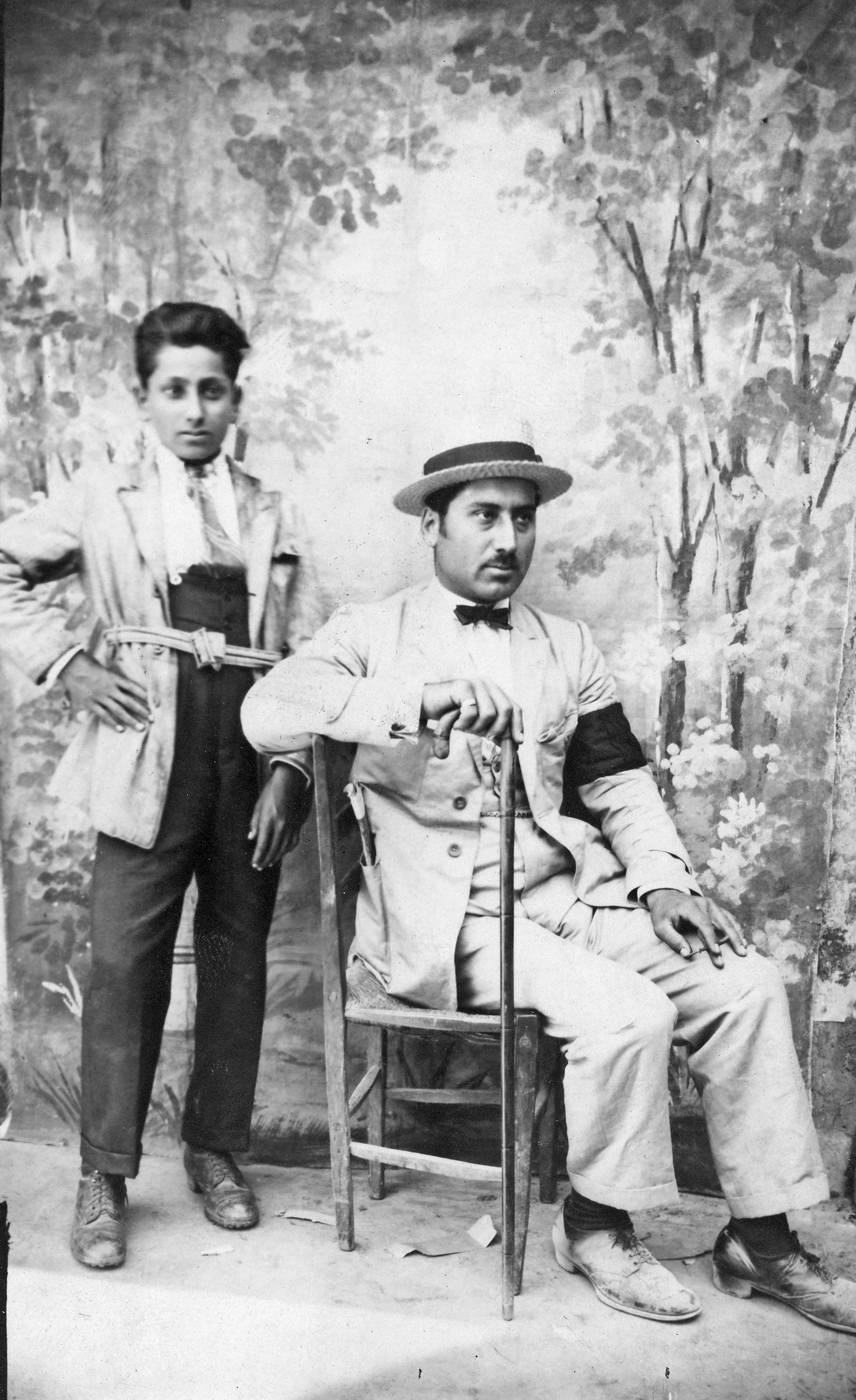
DeGrazia (left) and his Uncle Gregorio c. 1920s

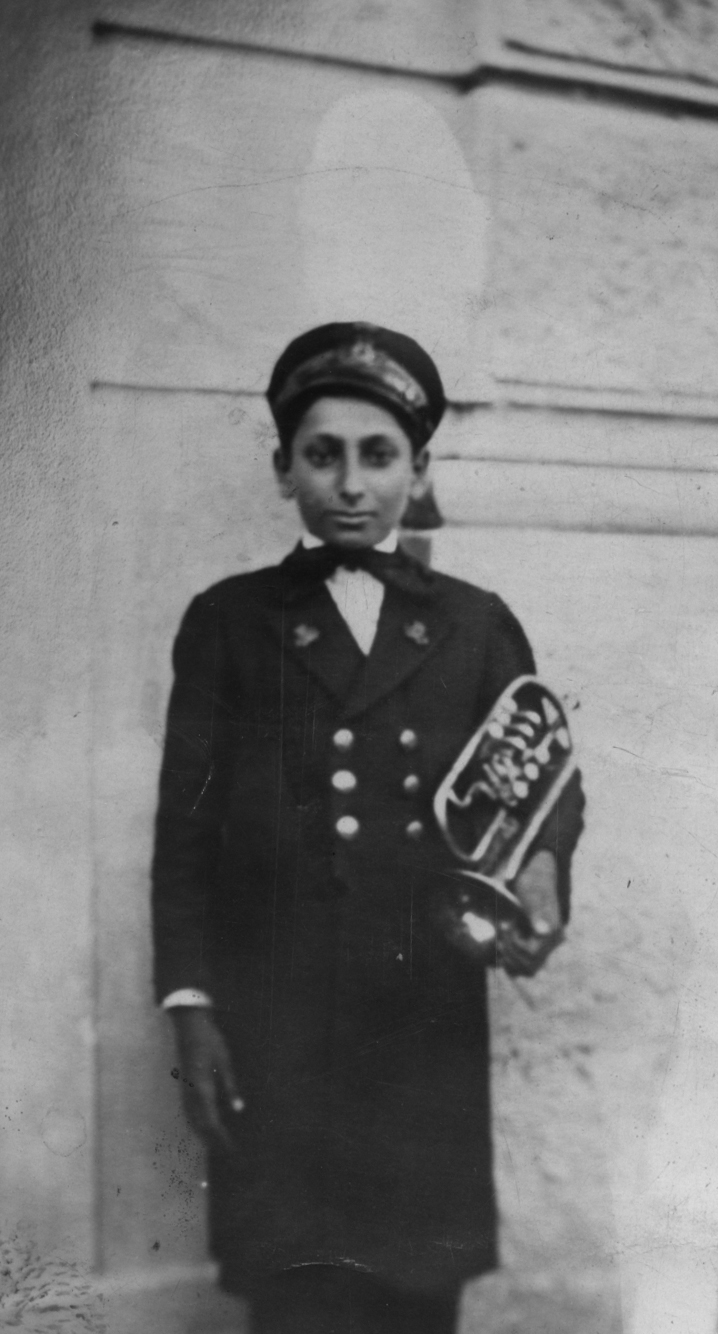
DeGrazia in Italy c. 1923

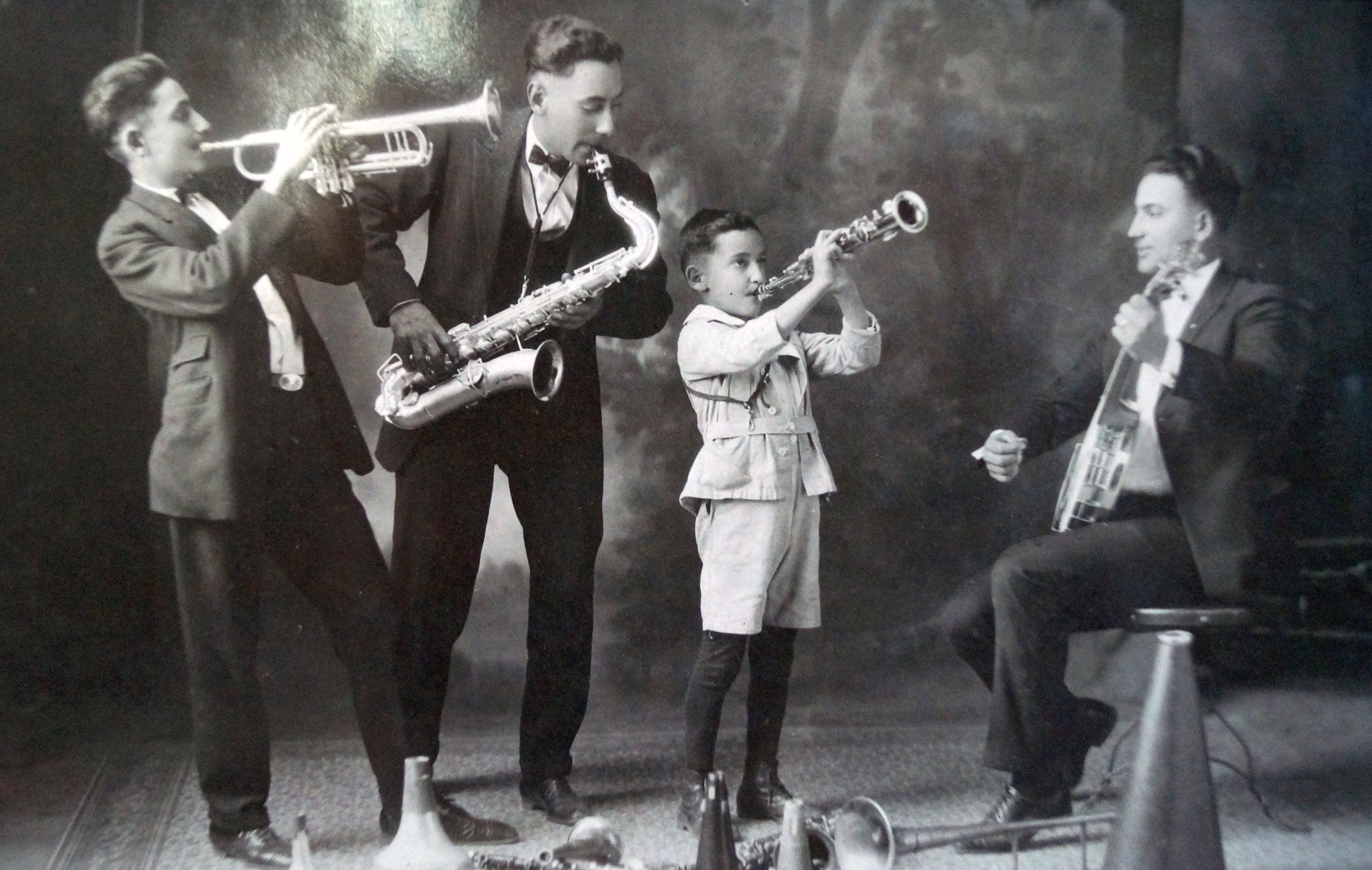
DeGrazia (far left) with brothers and a friend c. 1925

== Education ==
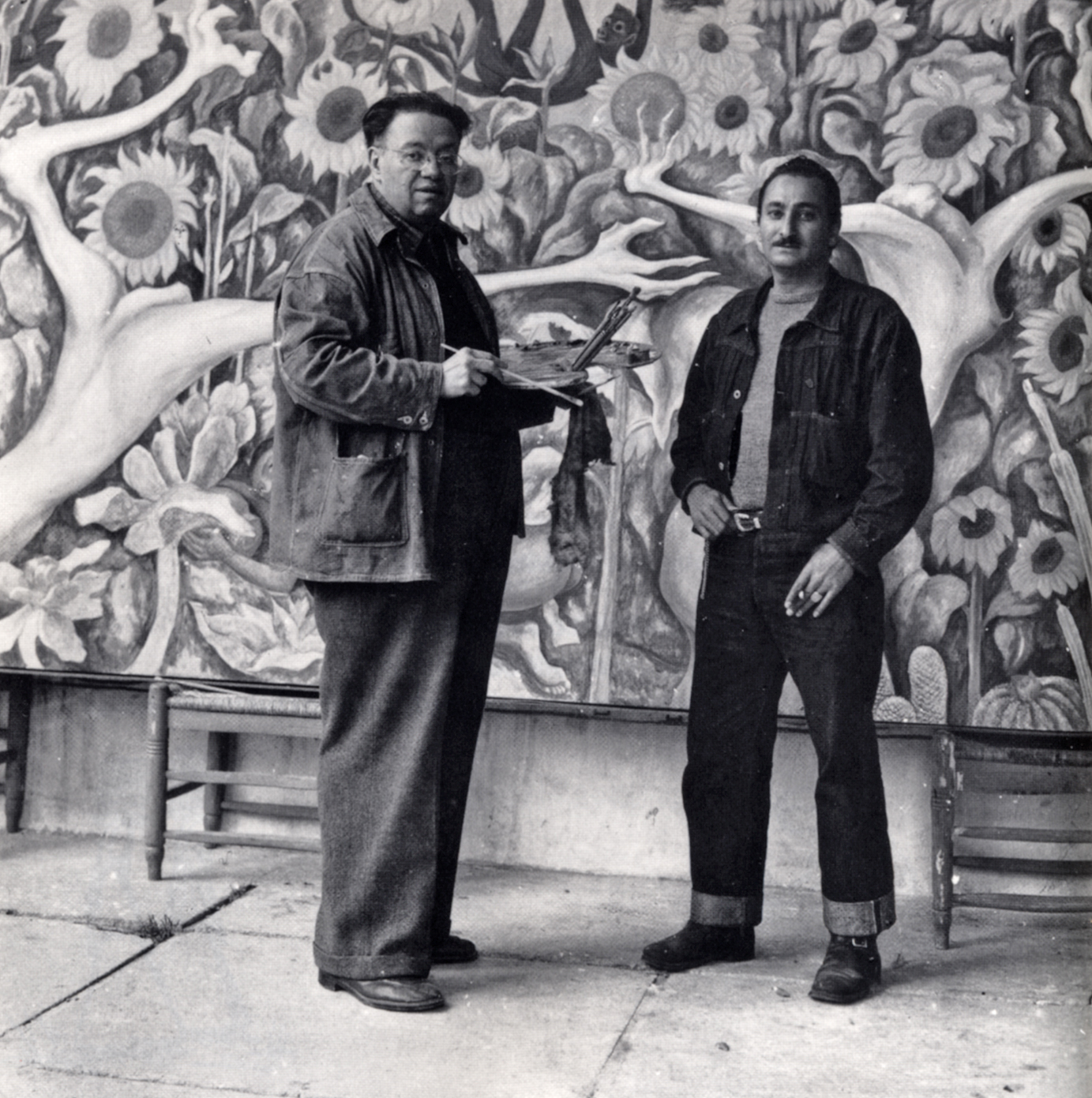
Rivera and DeGrazia c. 1942 Mexico City

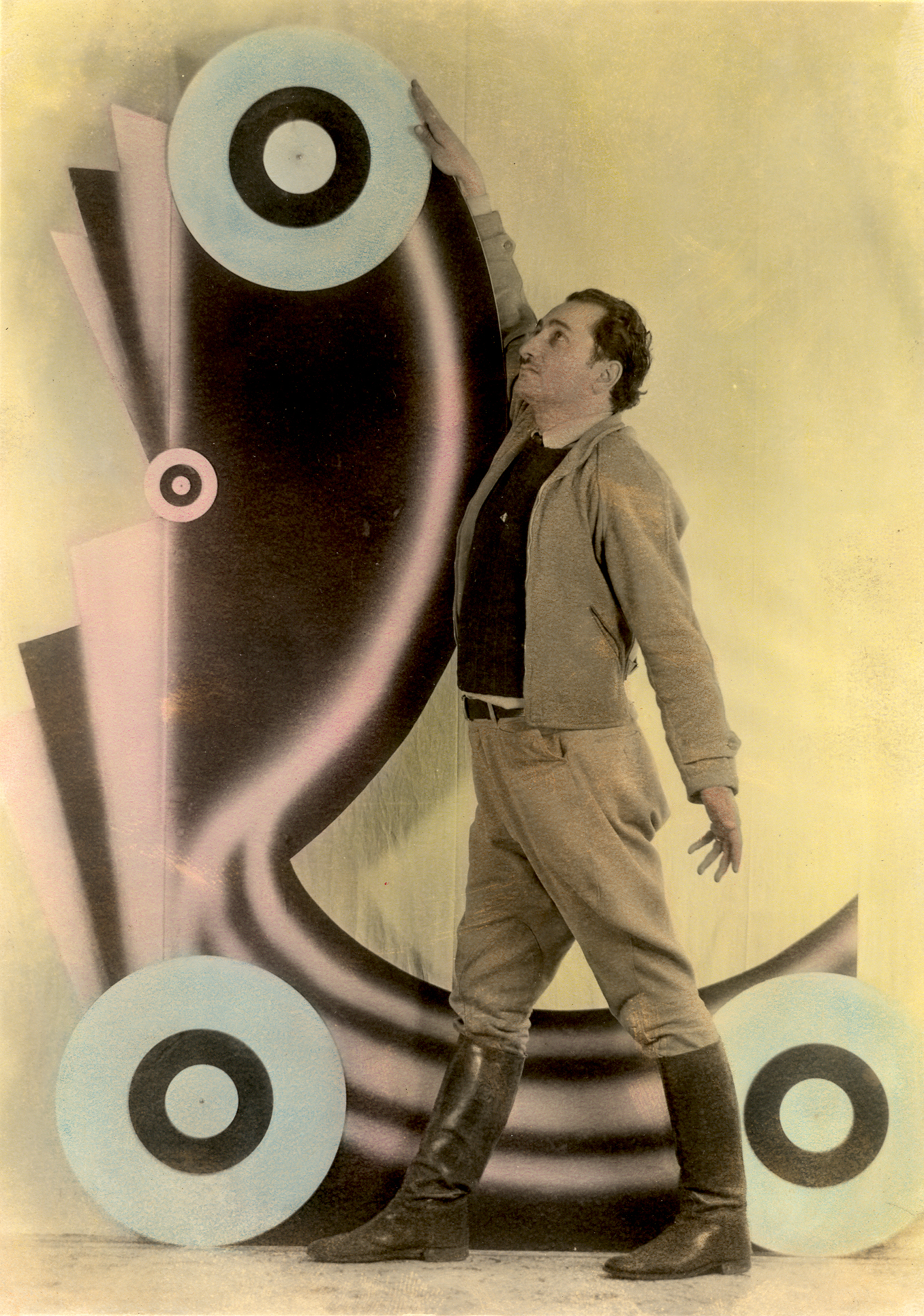
DeGrazia c. 1930s

With almost no possessions, DeGrazia caught a ride, and headed for Tucson. With fifteen dollars in his pocket, he enrolled at the University of Arizona in 1933. He played his trumpet at night, and landscaped at the University of Arizona during the day, in order to pay for his classes. He studied music and received his first bachelor's degree in Art Education. His second bachelor's degree was in Fine Arts. DeGrazia would eventually go back to school to earn a master's degree in Art Education in 1945.

In 1936, DeGrazia met Alexandra Diamos while attending classes at the University of Arizona, and that same year, they married. Her father was a business man who owned many of the largest movie theatres in Southern Arizona. One of his businesses was the Lyric theatre, located in Bisbee, Arizona. Alexandra and DeGrazia moved to Bisbee where he managed his father-in-law's theatre. The couple had three children Lucia De Grazia, Nicholas Domenic, and Kathleen Louise.

Although DeGrazia was making a living, he was not happy with this work. Any money he could save went towards art supplies. Any extra time he had went to his art. He was searching, trying to find his own style. In 1941, Arizona Highways magazine began to publish DeGrazia's images. He met many other famous, and soon-to-be famous, artists. In 1942, DeGrazia traveled to Mexico City where he met Diego Rivera, Mexico's master muralist. Rivera was taken with DeGrazia's artistic talent and agreed to take him on as an apprentice. DeGrazia assisted Rivera with murals at the Palacio Nacional and the Hospital de Jesus. DeGrazia also worked with José Clemente Orozco during this apprenticeship. The two Mexican masters sponsored an exhibition of DeGrazia's paintings at the Palace of Fine Art in Mexico City during 1942. During this period, America was enforcing the draft for WWII. Rivera wrote a letter to the United States government attempting to buy time for DeGrazia in order for him to complete his apprenticeship and keep him out of the military.

September 2, 1942

To Whom It May Concern:
This will introduce Mr. DeGrazia of Arizona, a young artist of promising future who wishes to come to Mexico to study the technique of frescoes. Because his work interests me I am willing to take him to work under me. I will appreciate a military leave of some sixty or ninety days from the selective service board, or whatever is necessary to enable him to come. He will work under me personally in my present project which I am executing at the National Palace of Mexico City.
This favor may be a contribution to the culture of our united nations. In appreciation of whatever can be done, I remain,
Sincerely,

Diego Rivera

The two artists sponsored an exhibit of his paintings at Palacio de Bellas Artes in 1942, and DeGrazia was also featured in Mexico City's ''Hoy'' Magazine. This was to be DeGrazia's first big exhibition.

DeGrazia returned to the University of Arizona, studying under Katherine Kitt. In 1944, DeGrazia was hired by Lou Witzeman, editor and chief at the University of Arizona, for a mural project in exchange for the cost of art supplies for the project. Witzeman gave him the freedom to paint whatever subject he wanted in a portion of the Old Main building located in the center of campus. Since this mural painting took place two years after his apprenticeship under Diego Rivera, DeGrazia chose to paint a politically based mural. The mural was titled, "Power of the Press."

A writer for the Arizona Daily Wildcat newspaper wrote an article in regards to this mural. "Bottles of paint, turpentine and tequila surround an artist lying on his back atop scaffolding. It is the spring of 1944 and American GIs are overseas fighting the axis powers. The artist strokes his brush on the wall about two stories tall and 15 feet wide until a mural begins to emerge. Night after night, the painter pieces together his puzzle. The colors are dark, as are the images. Skeletons, mortarboards, books and the apocalypse fill the cinder block canvas." His mural depicted "skulls topped with mortarboards peer(ing) at an open hand holding the flame of knowledge reaching out of a pile of books. The skulls represent people searching for knowledge. A figure, half-machine half-skeleton, resides atop the four horses of the apocalypse, trampling over the mask of happiness. The mask of tragedy remains untouched. The figure holds the World in its right hand; from its shoulder hangs a long sheet simple titled "News." In the far-left corner stand six skeletons donning graduating robes ... starving professors hang by their necks from the fingertips of a skeletal hand as the four horseman gallop over snakes slithering through books."

Excerpts from DeGrazia's politically based mural painted on a University of Arizona interior wall c. 1944.

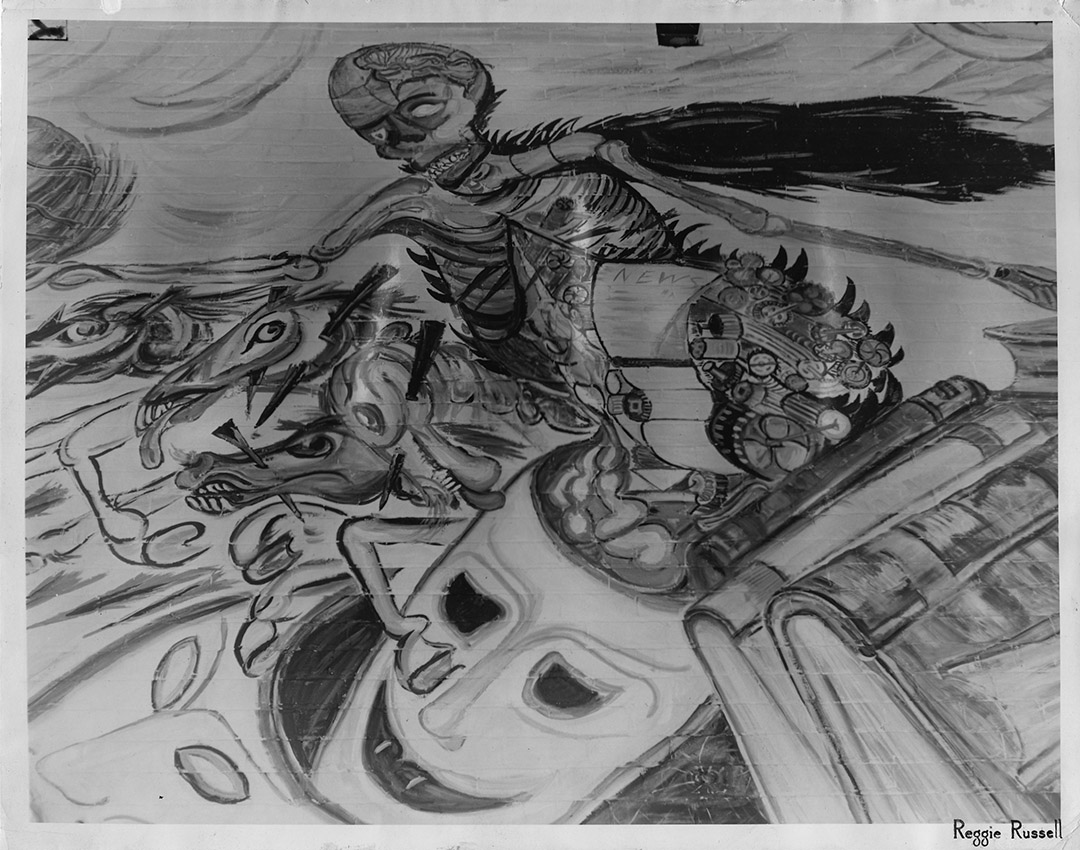
DeGrazia's politically based mural (pic 1). Photograph by Reggie Russell

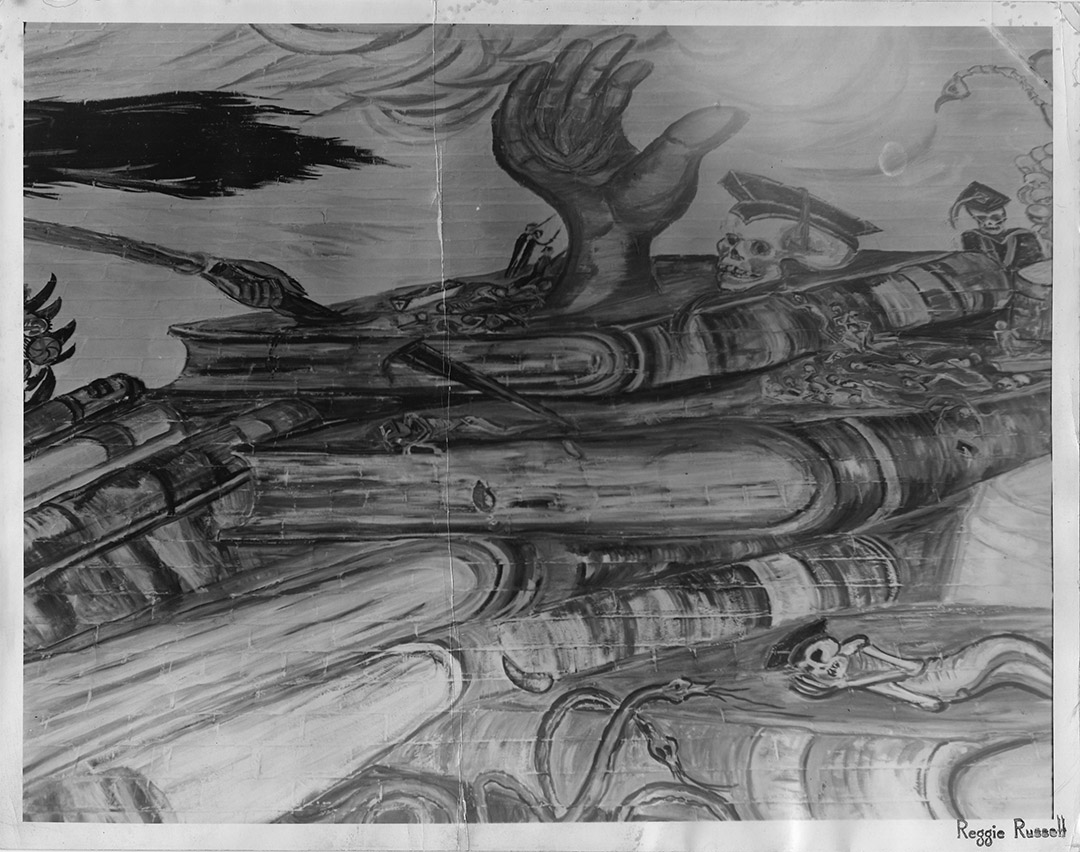
DeGrazia's politically based mural (pic 2). Photograph by Reggie Russell

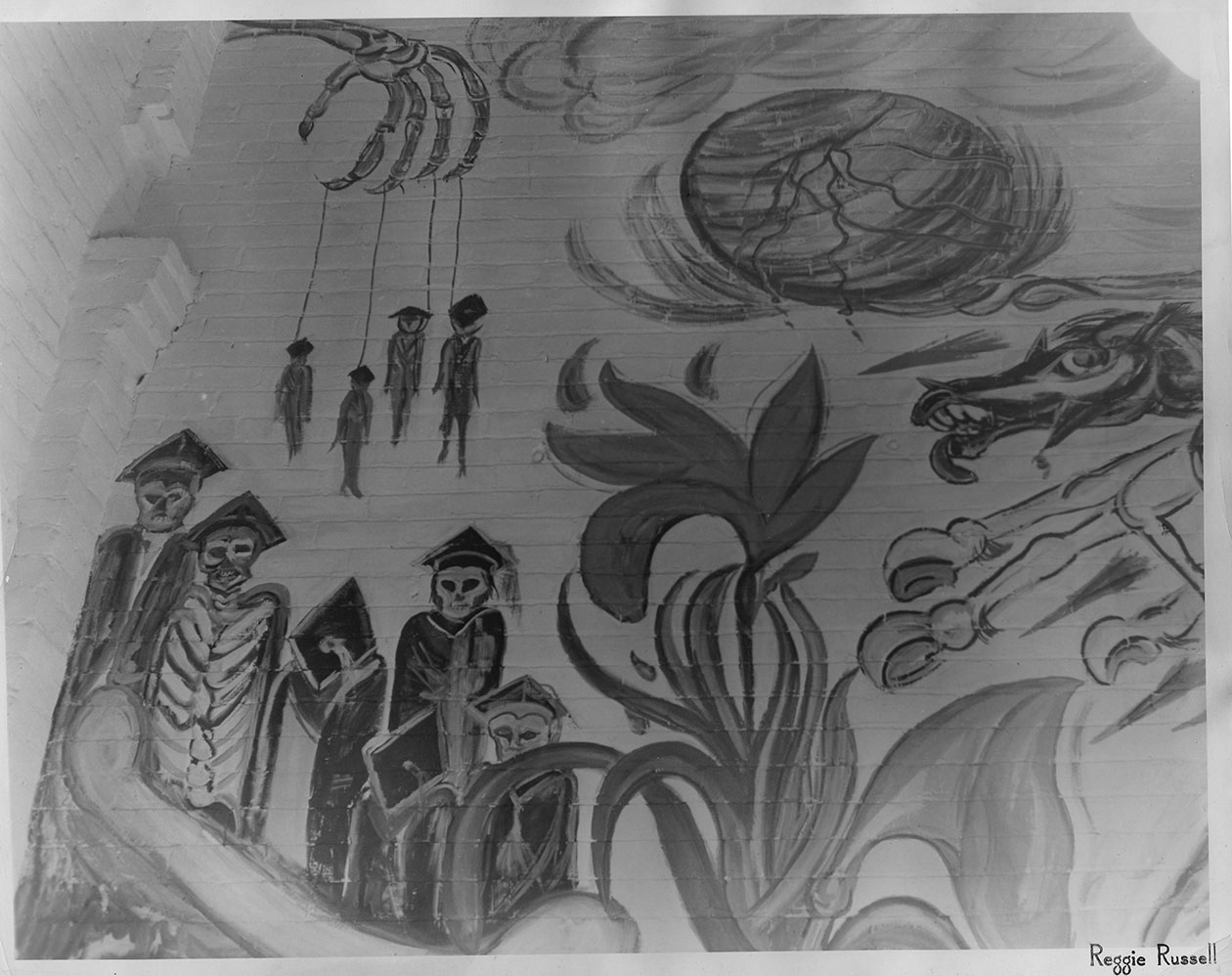
DeGrazia's politically based mural (pic 3). Photograph by Reggie Russell

DeGrazia was rebelling against commercialism in education. He felt that universities were growing too political, greedy, and corporate minded. DeGrazia's mural was depicting the lives lost in World War II and how the interests of businesses were what really controlled the educational system – not the educators.

The arts department at the university claimed they did not give permission for Witzeman and DeGrazia to paint the mural on campus property. "That summer, while the rest of us were in blissful ignorance, " Witzeman said, "someone came in with five gallons of whitewash and covered it up. It was terrible." The only evidence that the mural once existed is in the memories from family and friends and one oil on canvas DeGrazia painted for himself – a small excerpt from the original mural, and kept at the DeGrazia Gallery in the Sun.

In 1945, DeGrazia completed his Master's Thesis with a sixty paged paper titled: "Art and Its Relation to Music In Music Education." "The purpose of this thesis is to establish an analogy between music and abstract painting, showing the relationship between the elements of music and painting by setting forth a method whereby music can better be understood and appreciated by the projection of its moods and feelings into another dimension."

Part of DeGrazia's thesis included the 'Color Machine' which he built to measure the different levels of tone and pitch when music was being played. DeGrazia assigned specific emotions, shapes, and colors to his 'Color Music Pattern Test'. He gave the test to over 350 students at the University of Arizona. He made each student listen to classical music, including Stravinsky's Nightingale, and Beethoven's Symphony#8. He would stop the music in certain intervals and ask each student what colors and shapes they saw. They would then draw what shapes they had seen.

In the archives at the DeGrazia Foundation, there are oral histories from some of the students who were given the Color Music Pattern Test. At first, some students reported difficulty understanding how they would be able to perceive shapes and colors. According to these accounts, as they listened to the symphonies, they began to form mental associations involving shapes and colors and described this as "seeing" the music. DeGrazia later created a series of abstract paintings based on the results of these psychological, audio, and visual experimental tests. These works interpret the students’ responses through abstract forms of line, shape, and color. This master’s thesis is part of the permanent collection at the Gallery in the Sun.

In 1967, the University of Arizona granted DeGrazia the Alumni Achievement Award for all his accomplishments in art and his affiliation with the university.

later life images

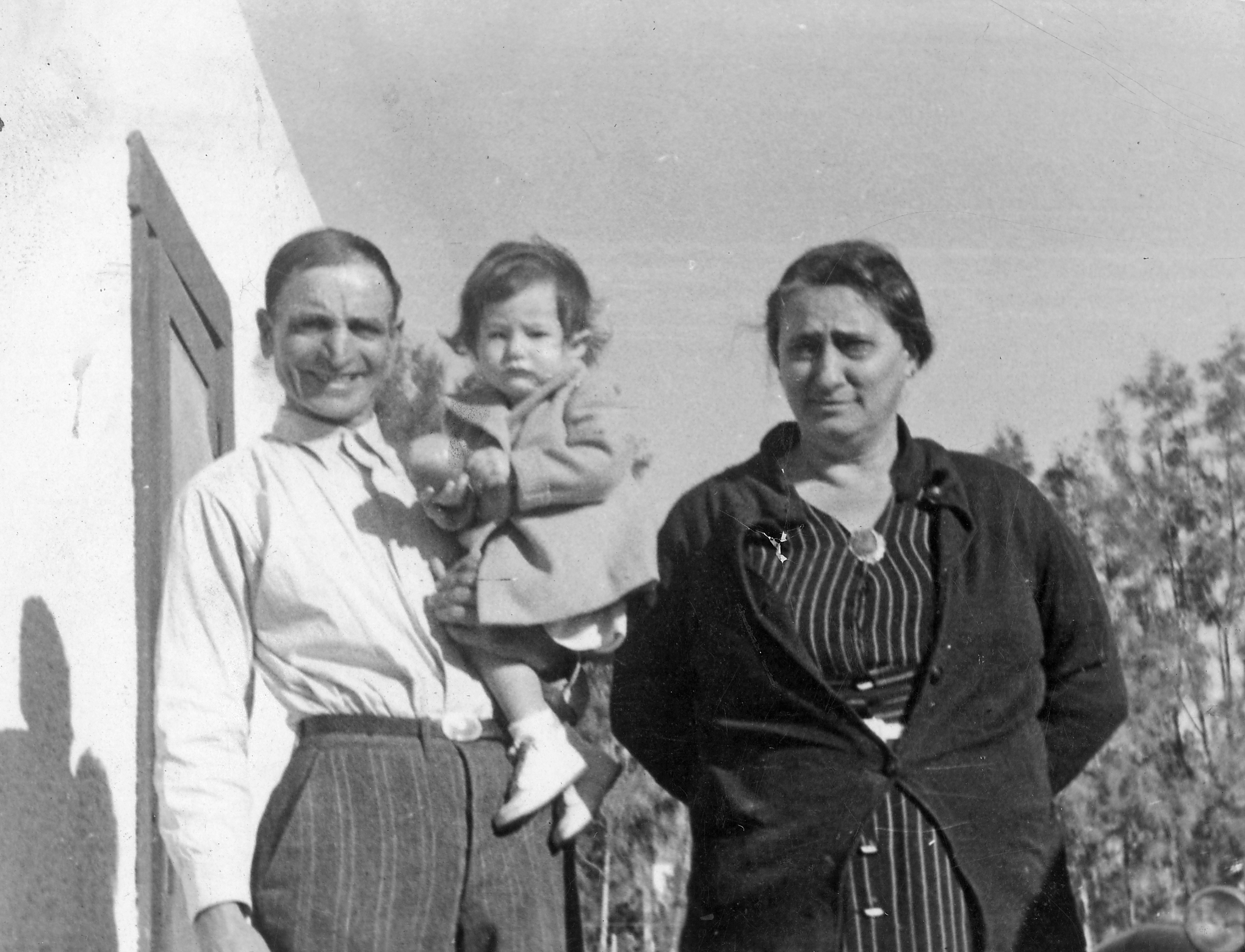
DeGrazia's daughter, Lucia, with his parents, Domenic and Lucia c. 1940

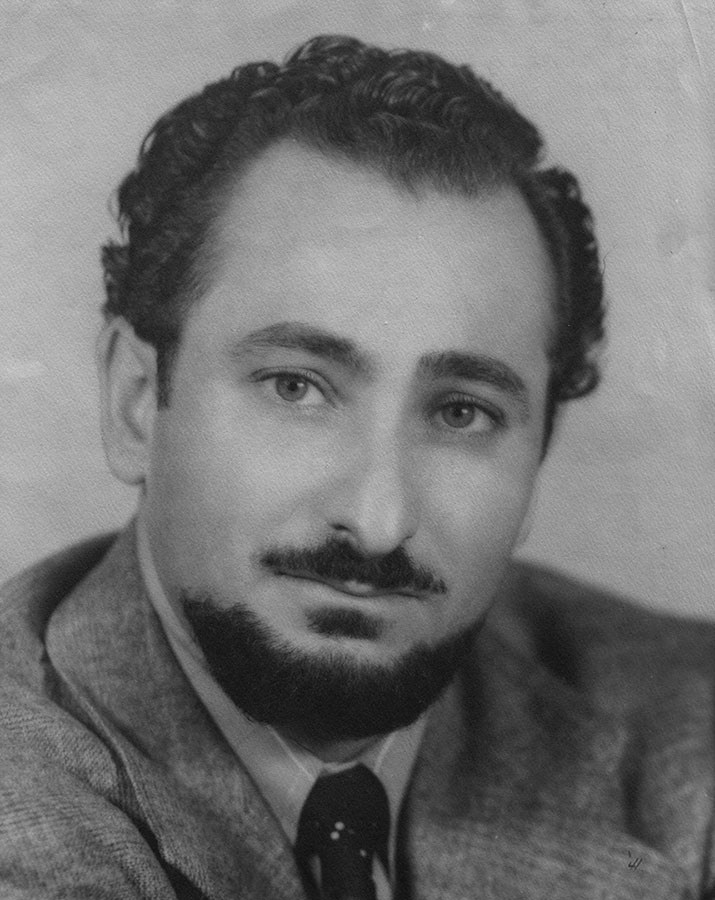
Portrait of DeGrazia c. 1941

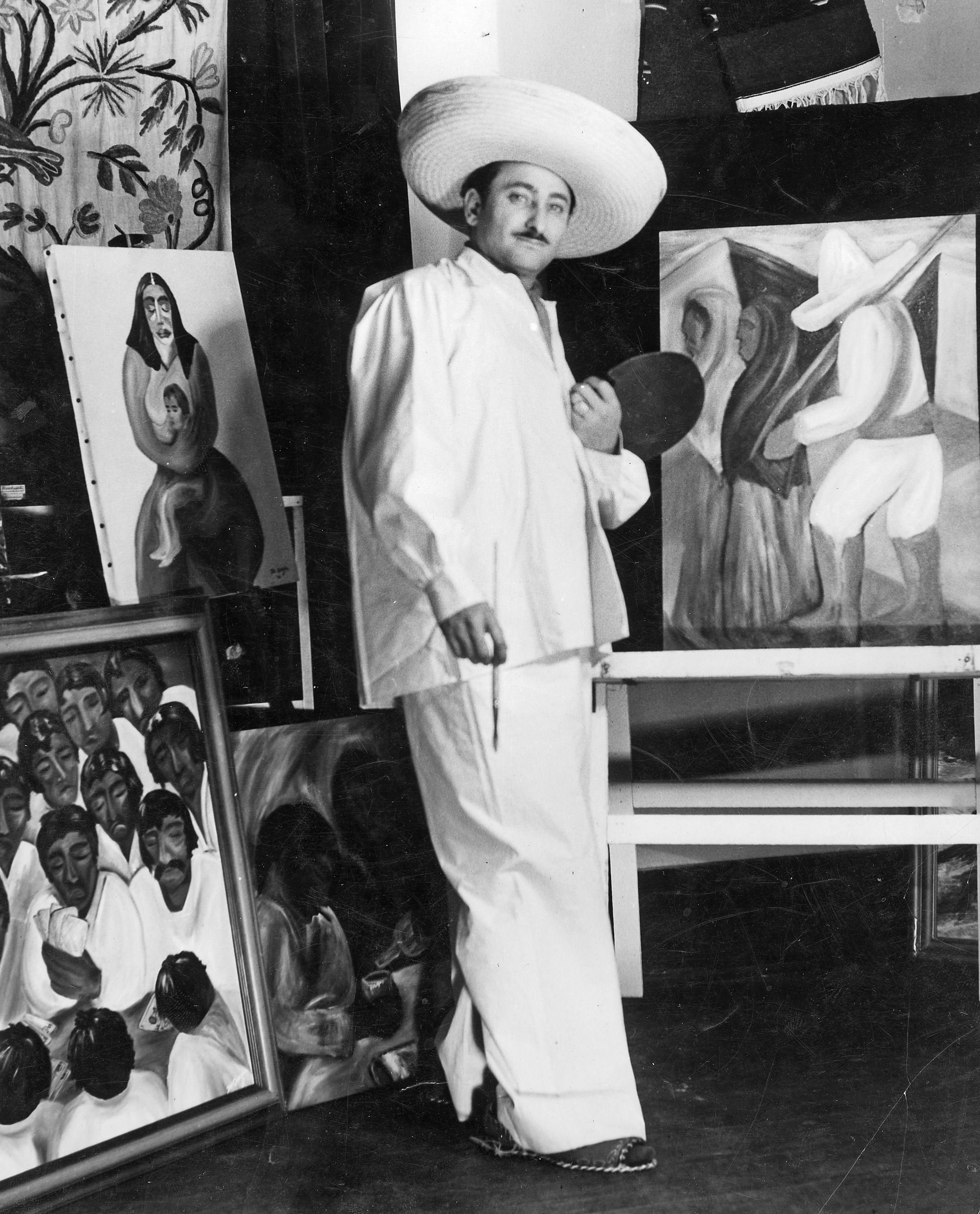
DeGrazia's first exhibition in Mexico at the Palace of Fine Arts c. 1942

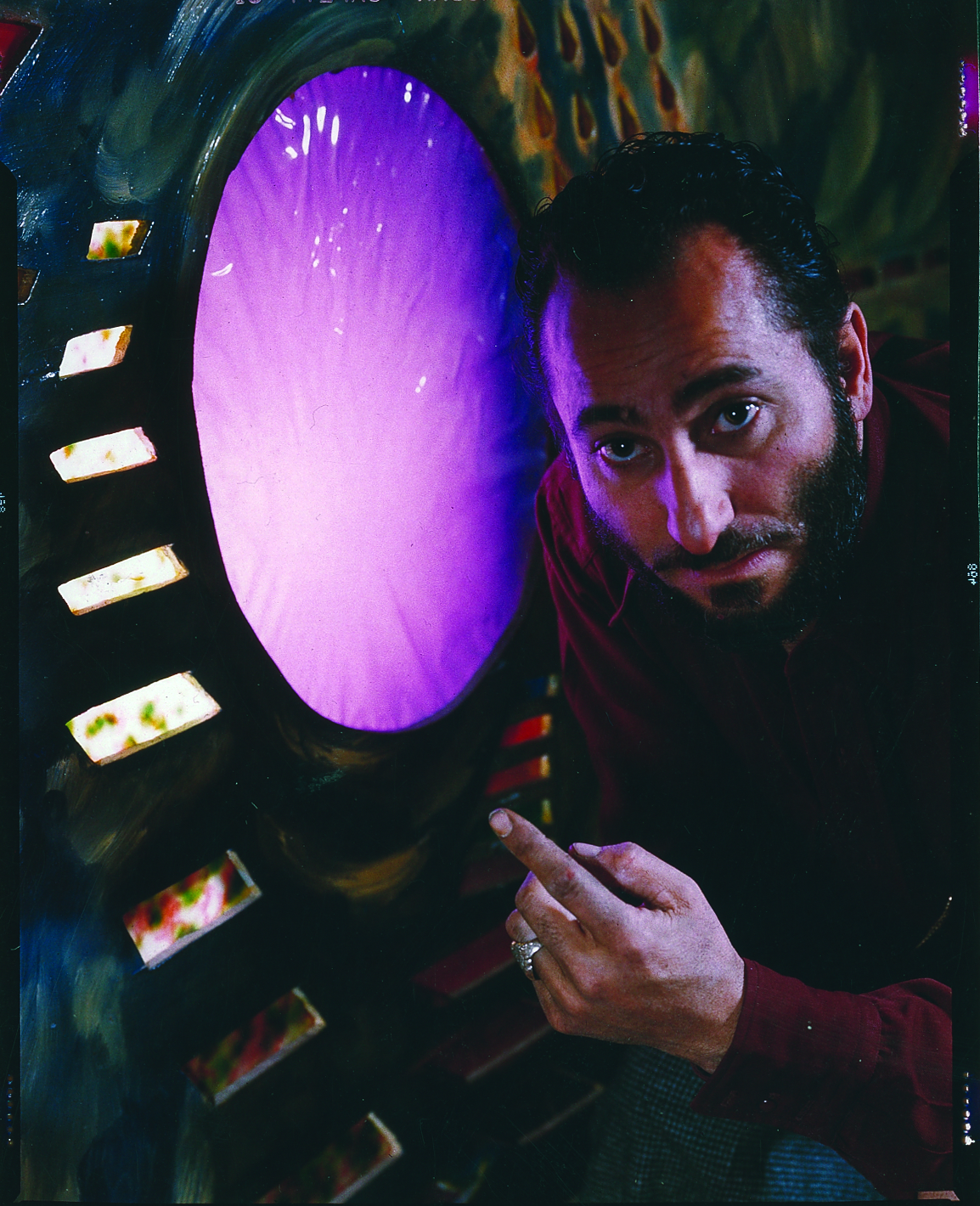
Music & Color: DeGrazia's Master Thesis c. 1945 University of Arizona

== Art career: early years ==
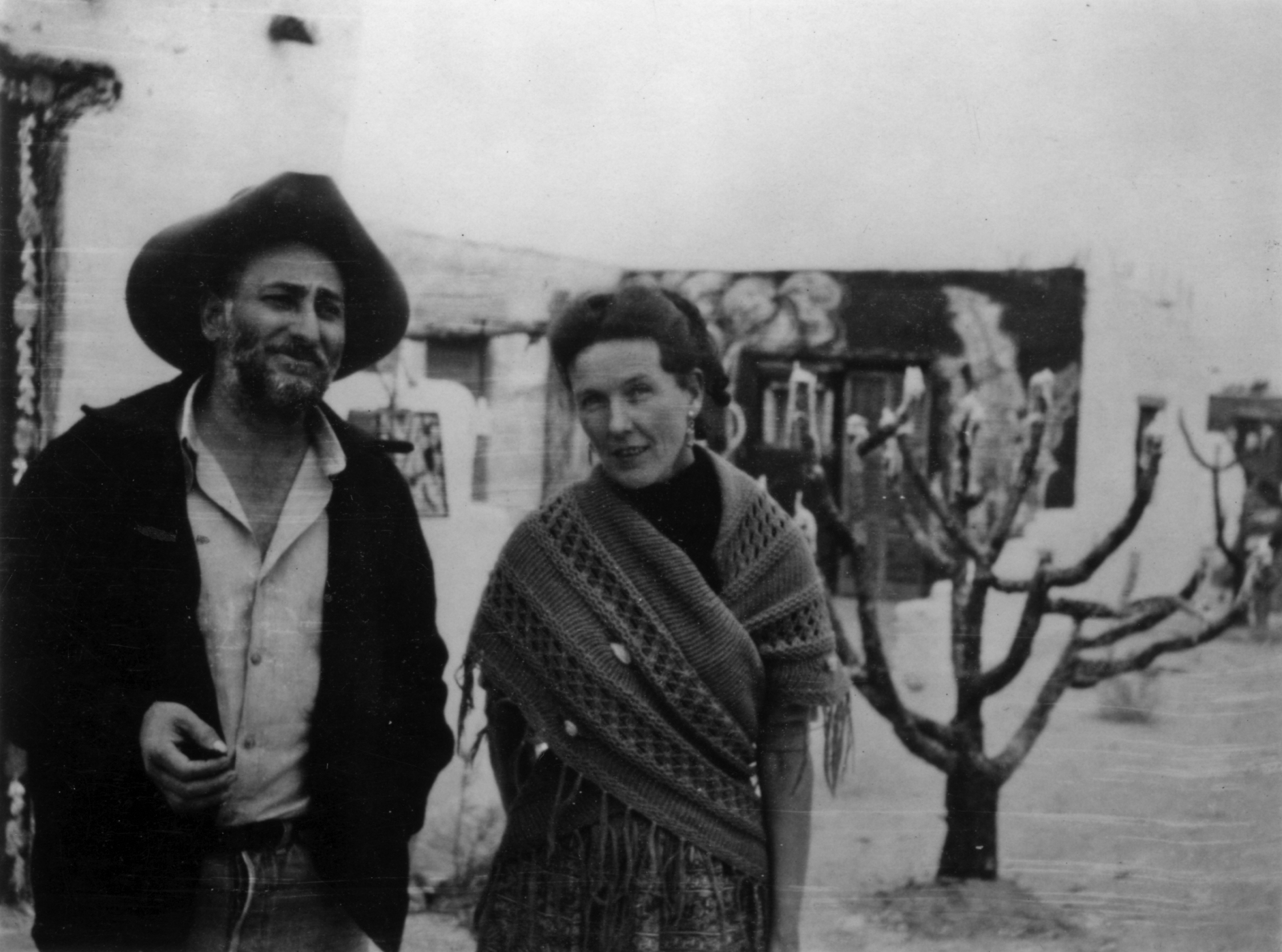
Ted and Marion DeGrazia in front of DeGrazia's first gallery c. 1940s

DeGrazia remembered well the criticism he received in those early days from people who thought his art wasn't any good. Individuals did not like how DeGrazia followed his own rules in regards to art. On one occasion, DeGrazia was sitting in Rosita's Mexican restaurant (located next to his gallery) and a man walked in and shouted to him from across the room. He said," Hey! You DeGrazia?!" DeGrazia did not reply, and kept talking with his friend. The man, who obviously did not like DeGrazia, strode over to DeGrazia's table and interrupted him. He said to DeGrazia, "You're that guy who thinks you can paint on whatever you want, right? – No rules, you just do whatever you want!" DeGrazia still did not say anything. There was a basket of tortillas on the table, so DeGrazia took one out and began to paint it. When he finished, he took his brush and he autographed the angry man's clean, white shirt. Before the man stormed out, cursing at DeGrazia, the only thing DeGrazia said to him was, "Now I have painted on everything." The man did not bother to take his original tortilla painting with him, so DeGrazia kept it and it is also on display at the Gallery In the Sun.

In 1946 DeGrazia and Alexandra were divorced. One year later, DeGrazia married Marion Sheret in a small chapel, deep in the jungles of Mexico. With his marriage to Marion, the door was opened to establish his greatest achievement, the Gallery In the Sun.

By the late forties, the city of Tucson began encroaching on DeGrazia's gallery. He felt cramped with so many people moving to Tucson and he wanted to escape its growth. In 1949, he bought 10 acres of land in the Santa Catalina Foothills, north of Tucson. At this time there was no electricity, water, or services. All supplies that they needed had to be transported from Tucson. They cooked their food in an old wood-burning stove and took showers outside with water from a bucket. Little by little, construction companies began to bulldoze the big saguaro cacti around him to build homes, businesses, and even a country club. This saddened DeGrazia.

gallery images

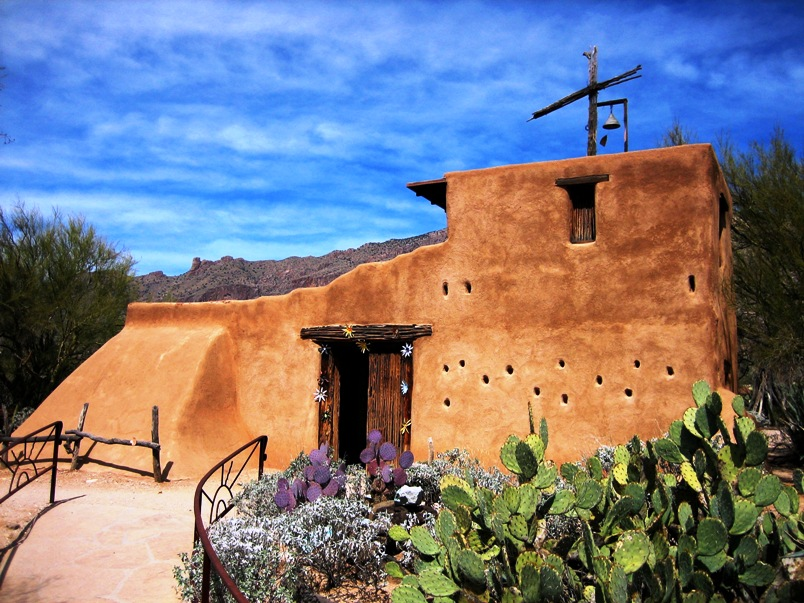
DeGrazia's Mission In the Sun, completed in 1952

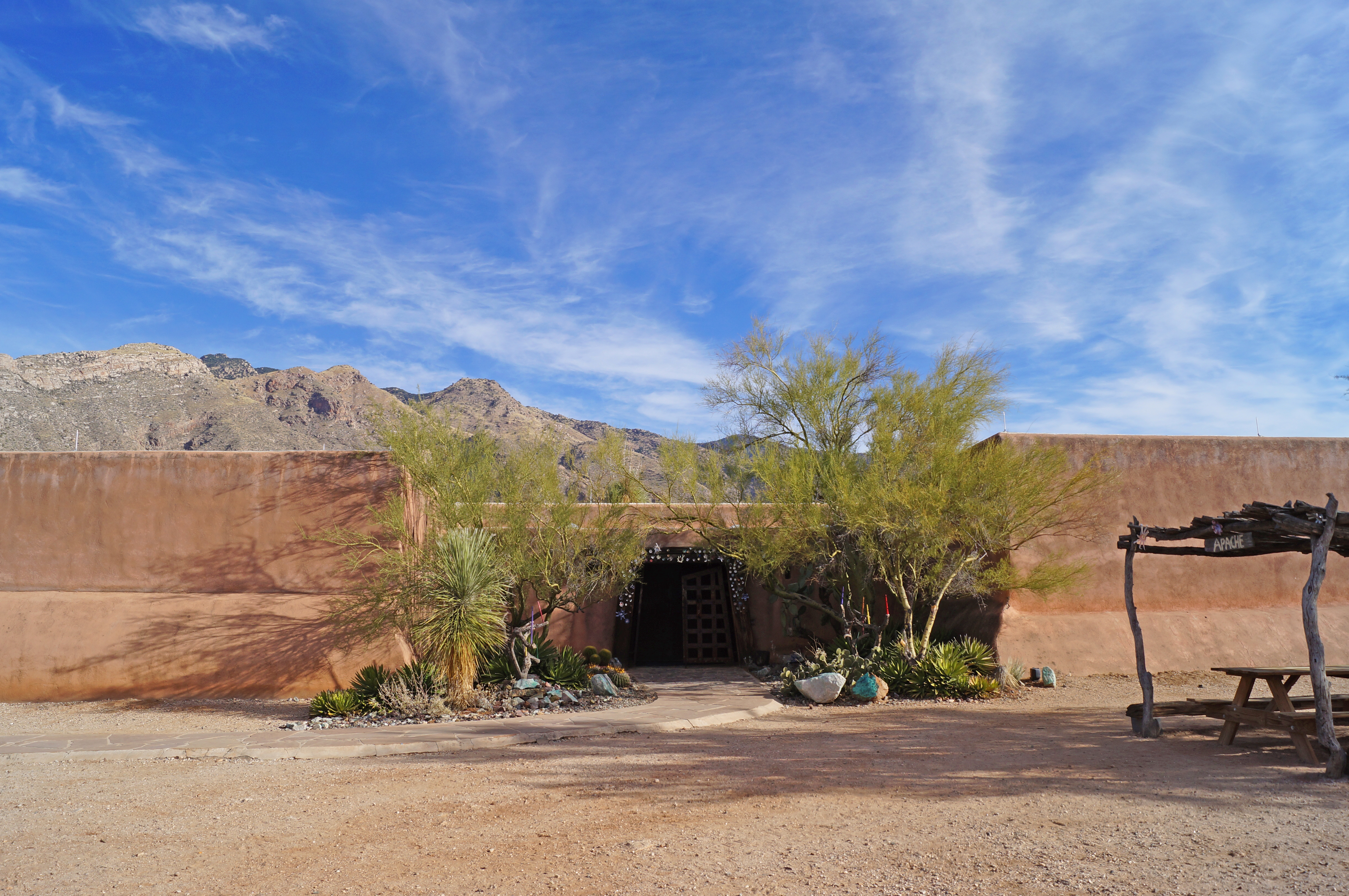
Gallery In the Sun – Tucson, Arizona

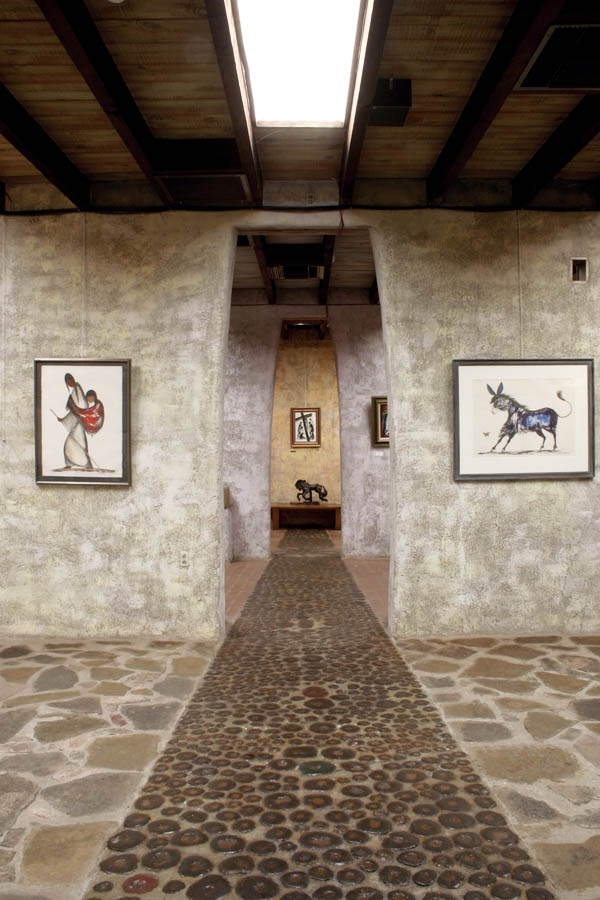
Cholla cactus floor in the Gallery In the Sun

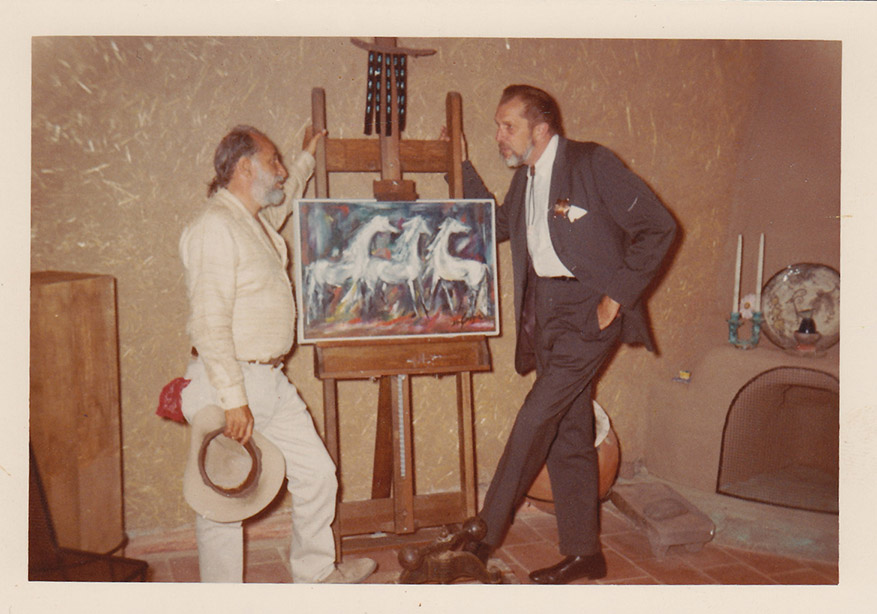
DeGrazia showing actor Vincent Price his Gallery In the Sun c. 1968

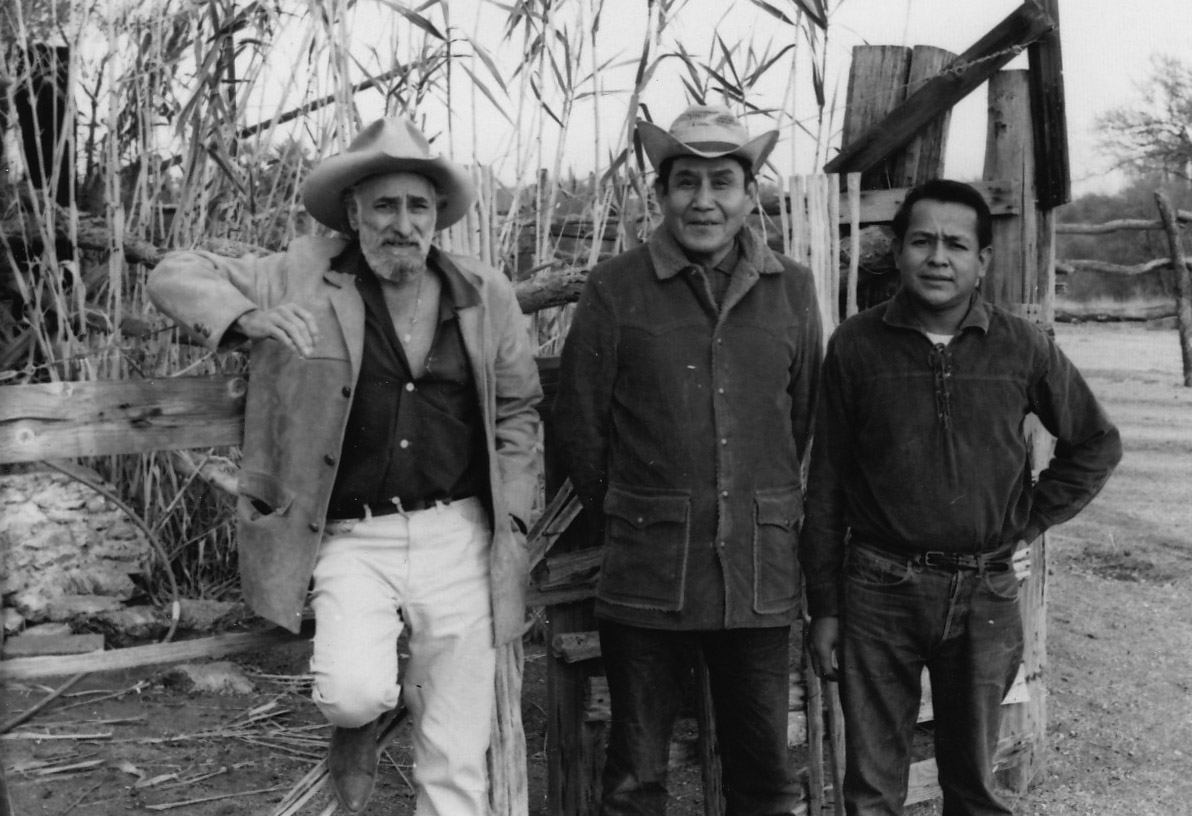
Navajo artists Harrison Begay and Robert Chee – Chee and family spent two winters at the Gallery In the Sun c. 1960s

== Art career: later years ==
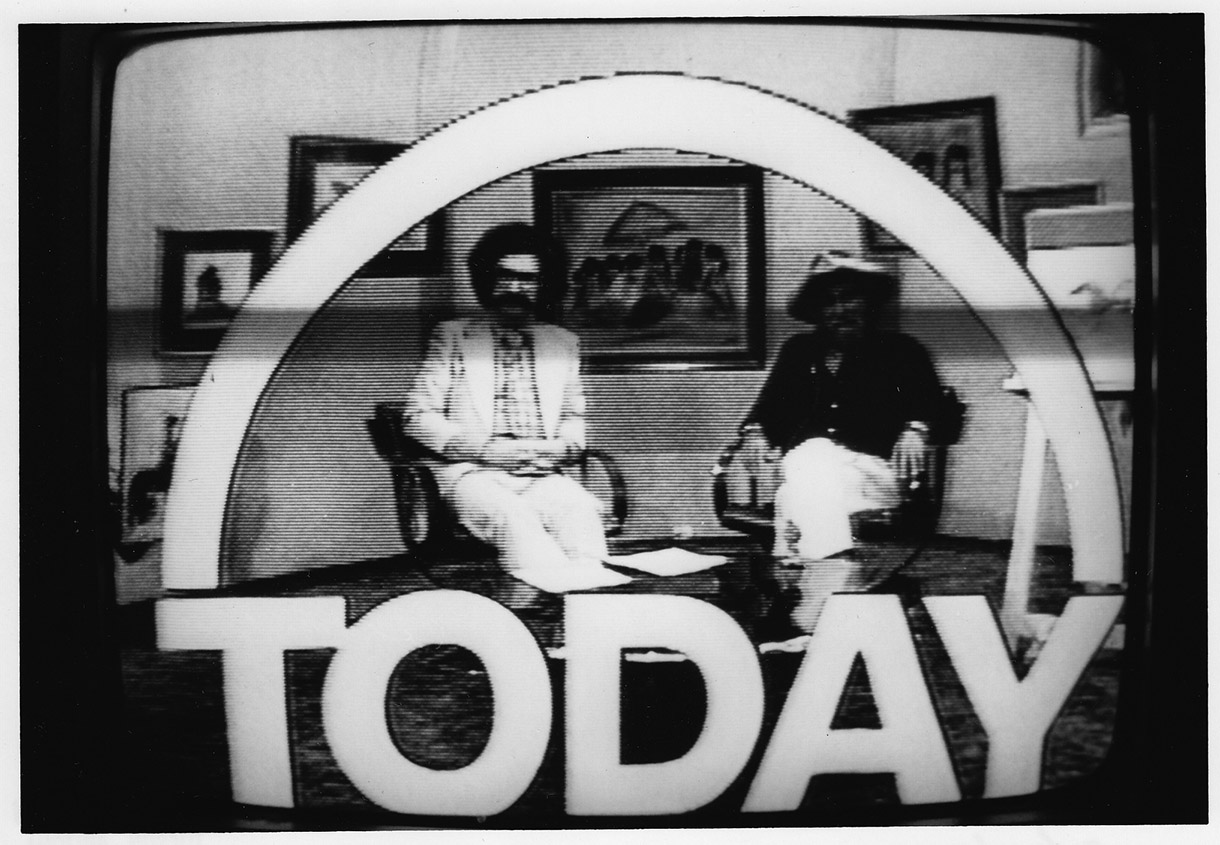
DeGrazia being interviewed on NBC Today Show c. 1976. Photograph by Dick Frontain

Once DeGrazia had his home and his Little Gallery he was then free to start work on his dream gallery, the DeGrazia Gallery in the Sun. DeGrazia built the Mission in the Sun, his home, and his original 'Little Gallery' (was original gallery on property) near the corner of Swan and Skyline roads. The DeGrazia Gallery in the Sun was finished being built in 1965, and with the aid of Yaqui and Tohono O'odham friends. This main gallery houses thirteen separate galleries of original artwork. During this time, DeGrazia never stopped painting. In the early 1950s he started seriously working on ceramics. This is when he perfected his copper-based glaze. NBC studios recorded a newsreel, called 'Watch the World,' where they filmed DeGrazia and Marion making these ceramics.

DeGrazia's wife, Marion, recalled this time as "all work and no play." "The only time for relaxation away from the studio was on the trail in the Superstition Mountains, while prospecting for gold, or with the Indians in Arizona and Mexico. When invited to have a show in Cannes France, he refused to go. The only place he wanted to be was in Indian country." DeGrazia explains himself, "because I was born in the southwest, and live there, I live it with a passion. The state has a harsh temperament as though it were alive. It is rough, colorless, and silent. And yet, you feel a gentleness, see beauty, and color in a storm, the skies roar, the cactus of the desert in its prickly silence bursts forth for a moment of exquisite beauty."

Some of his more famous friends included Lee Garmes, Vincent Price, Iron Eyes Cody, Namara Traviata, Alan Hale, Jr., Navajo artists Harrison and Robert Chee, Lee Marvin, Thomas Hart Benton, Olaf Wieghorst, Sammi Smith, Jack Van Ryder, Pete Martinez, Ross Santee, and Broderick Crawford of the t.v. series Highway Patrol.

In 1960, DeGrazia got his big break. UNICEF requested permission to use his image of Los Ninos, an oil painting, to produce greeting cards. Many millions were sold worldwide, giving DeGrazia the title as most reproduced artist in the world. During this time, DeGrazia's popularity and success exploded.

In 1976, DeGrazia engaged in a protest against the Federal Inheritance Tax. The artist claimed the U.S. Internal Revenue Service rulings made him "a millionaire on paper, but my heirs will have to pay taxes for which there is no money." In his well-publicized protest, DeGrazia rode horseback into the Superstition Mountains and burned about 100 of his paintings, an estimated worth of 1.5 million dollars at the time.

The only way for DeGrazia to avoid this government taxation was for him to make his Gallery In the Sun a non-profit foundation. In this way he was able to keep his collection intact and also his fortune.

In 1982, DeGrazia died of cancer on September 17, at the age of 73. His beloved Gallery In the Sun has been listed on the National Historic Registry as a historic district, in 2006.

art career images

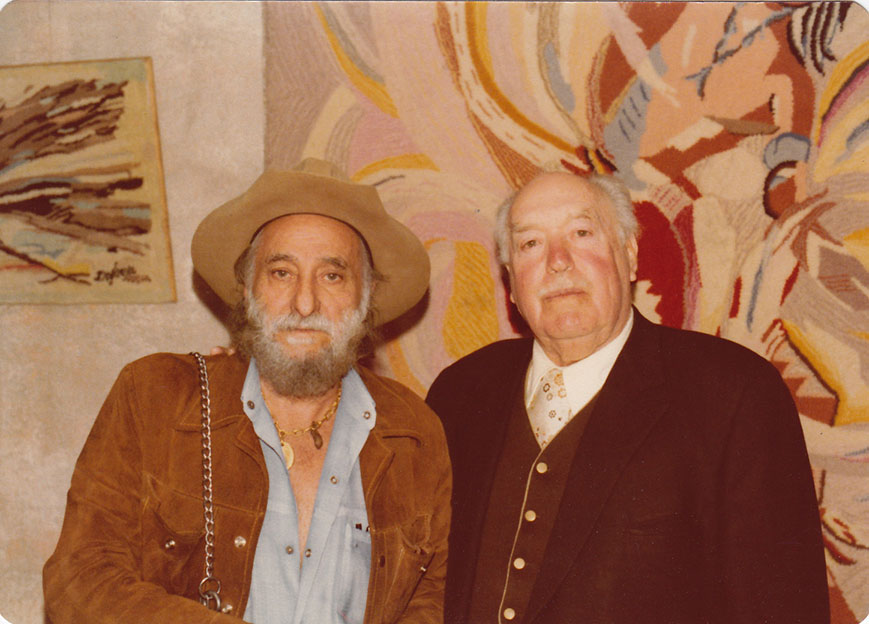
DeGrazia and motion picture Cinematographer and Director, Lee Garmes, who worked with DeGrazia on several films c. 1970s

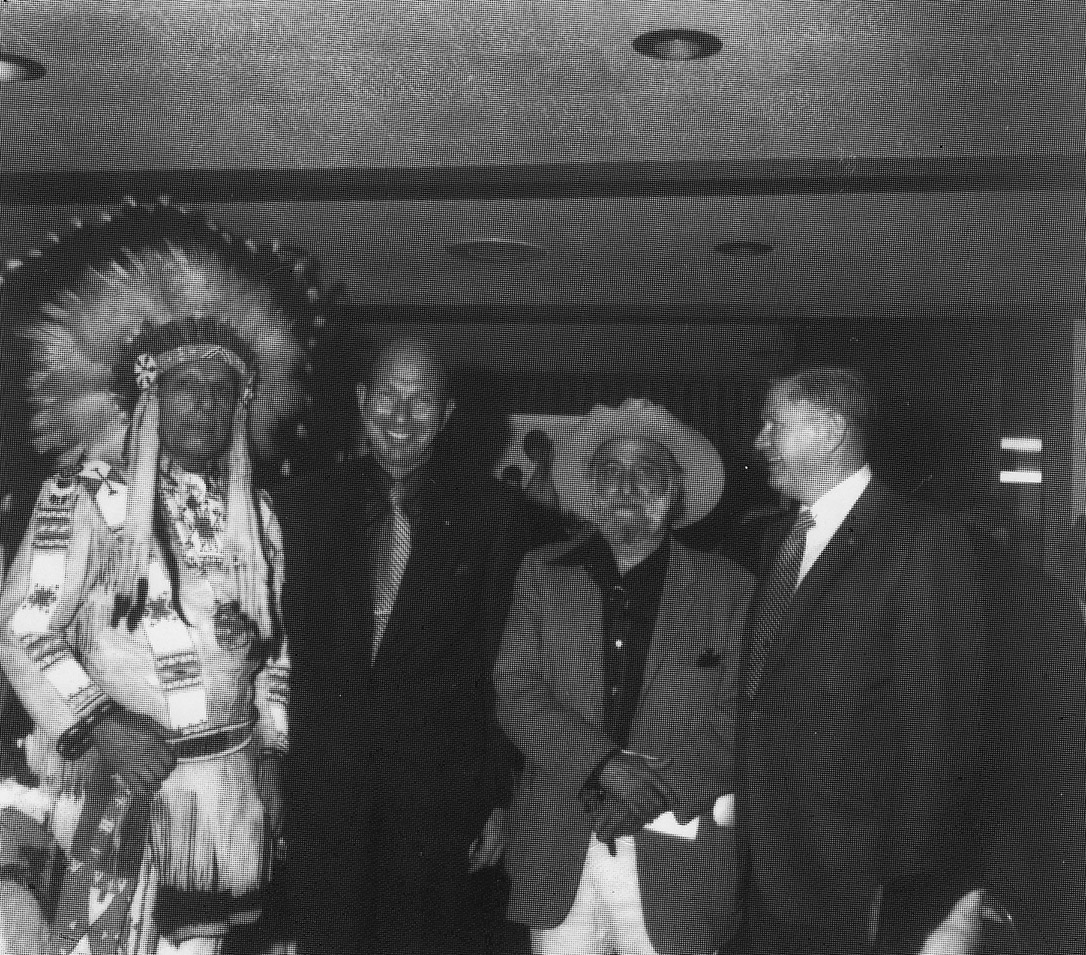
Iron Eyes Cody, Bill Fremont, DeGrazia, and Jack Mimnaugh, c. 1971 (from left)

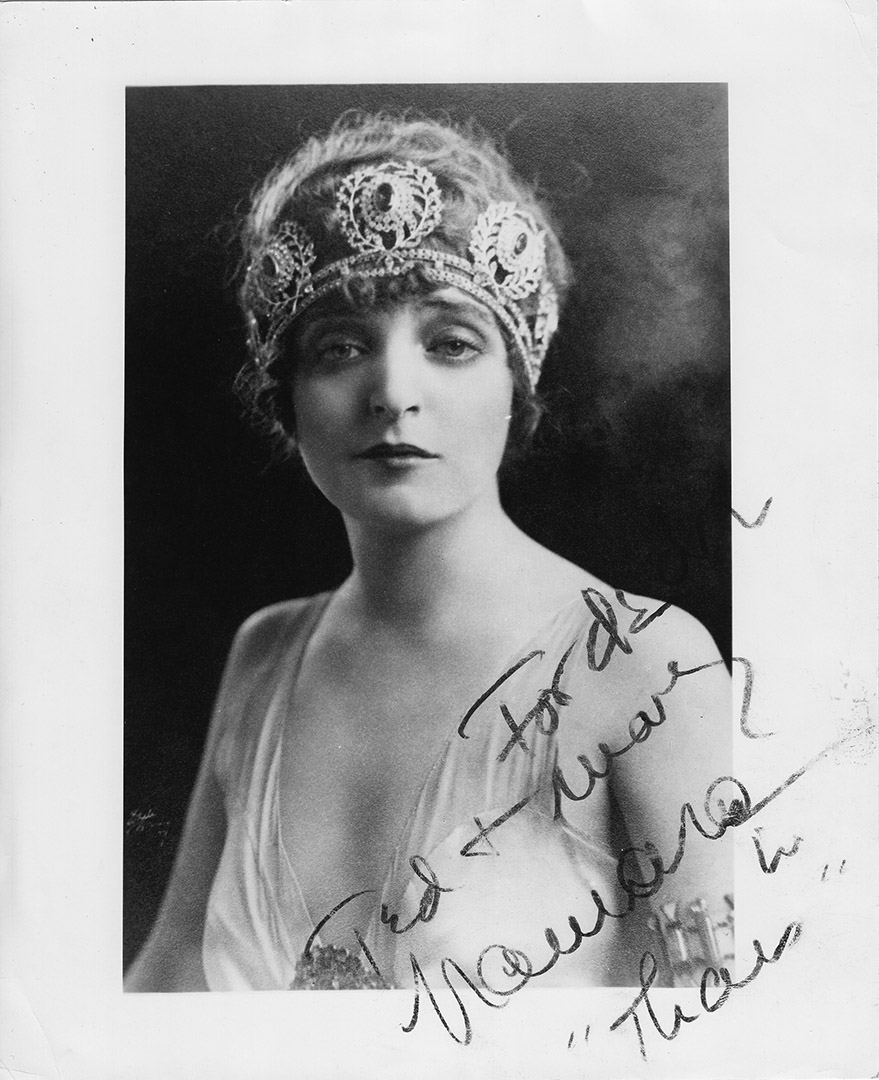
Friend of DeGrazia's, Italian actress, Namara Traviata c. 1930s

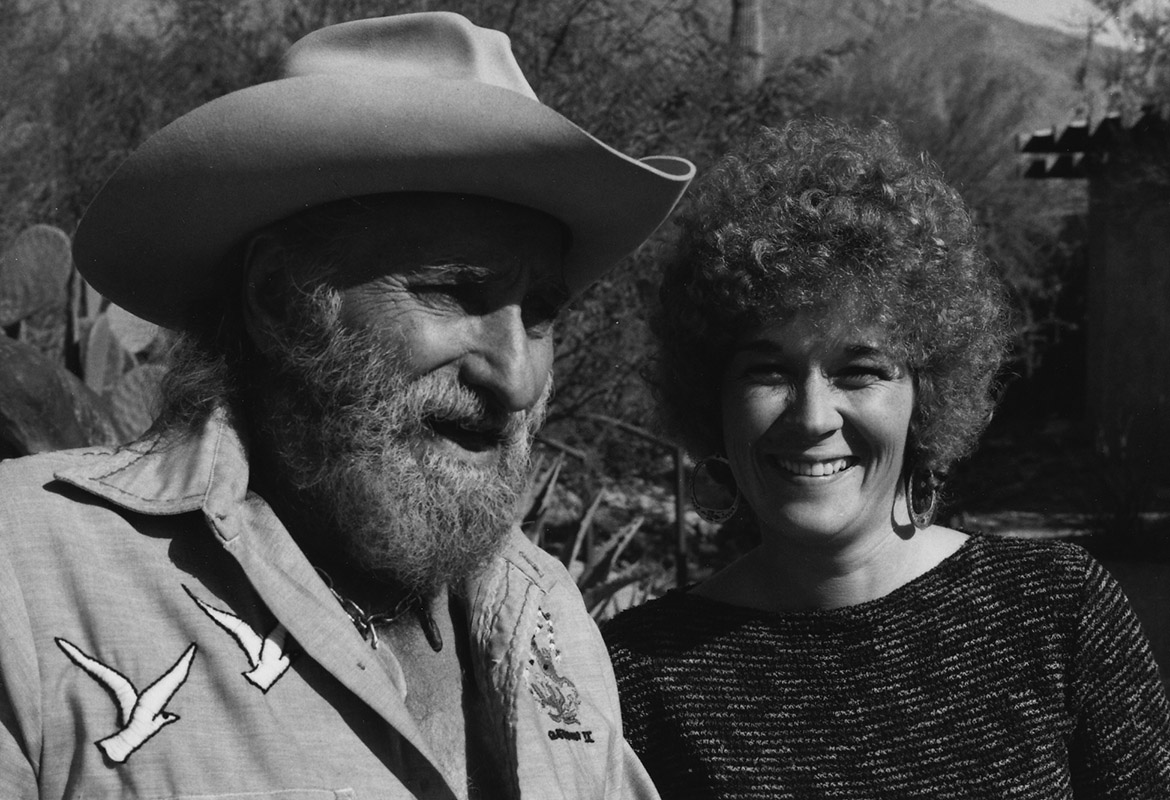
Degrazia with singer, Sammi Smith c. 1977. Photograph by Dick Frontain

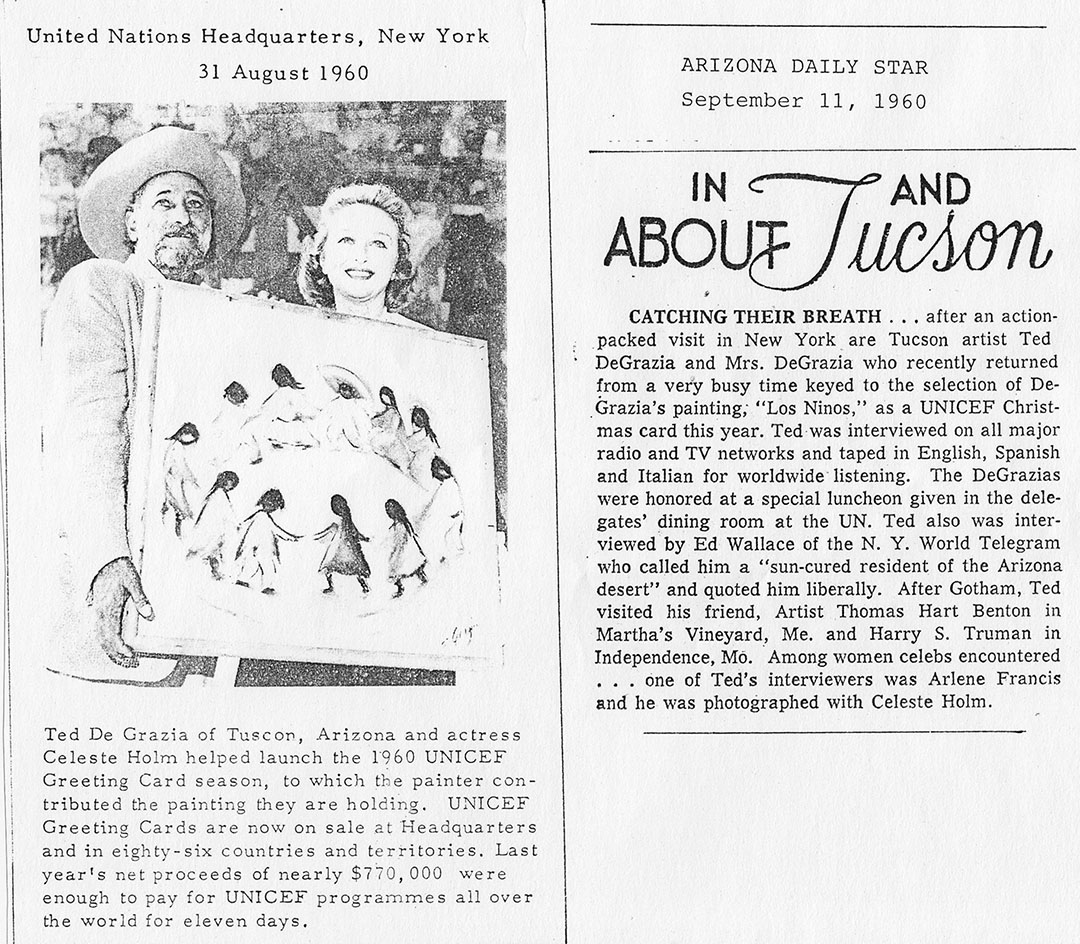
UNICEF uses DeGrazia's 'Los Ninos' painting to raise money for children c. 1960

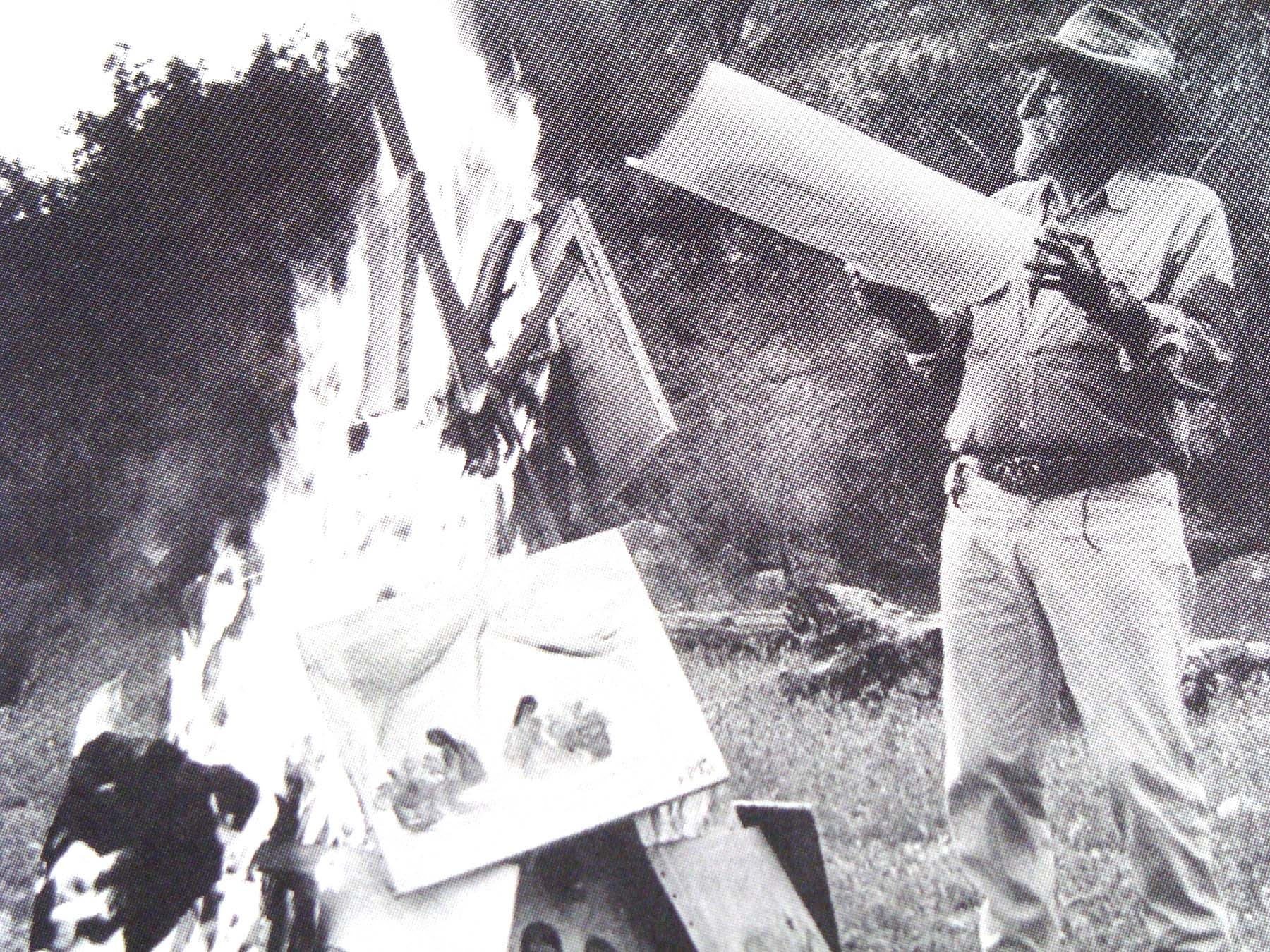
DeGrazia burning his originals in protest against the Inheritance Tax c. 1976

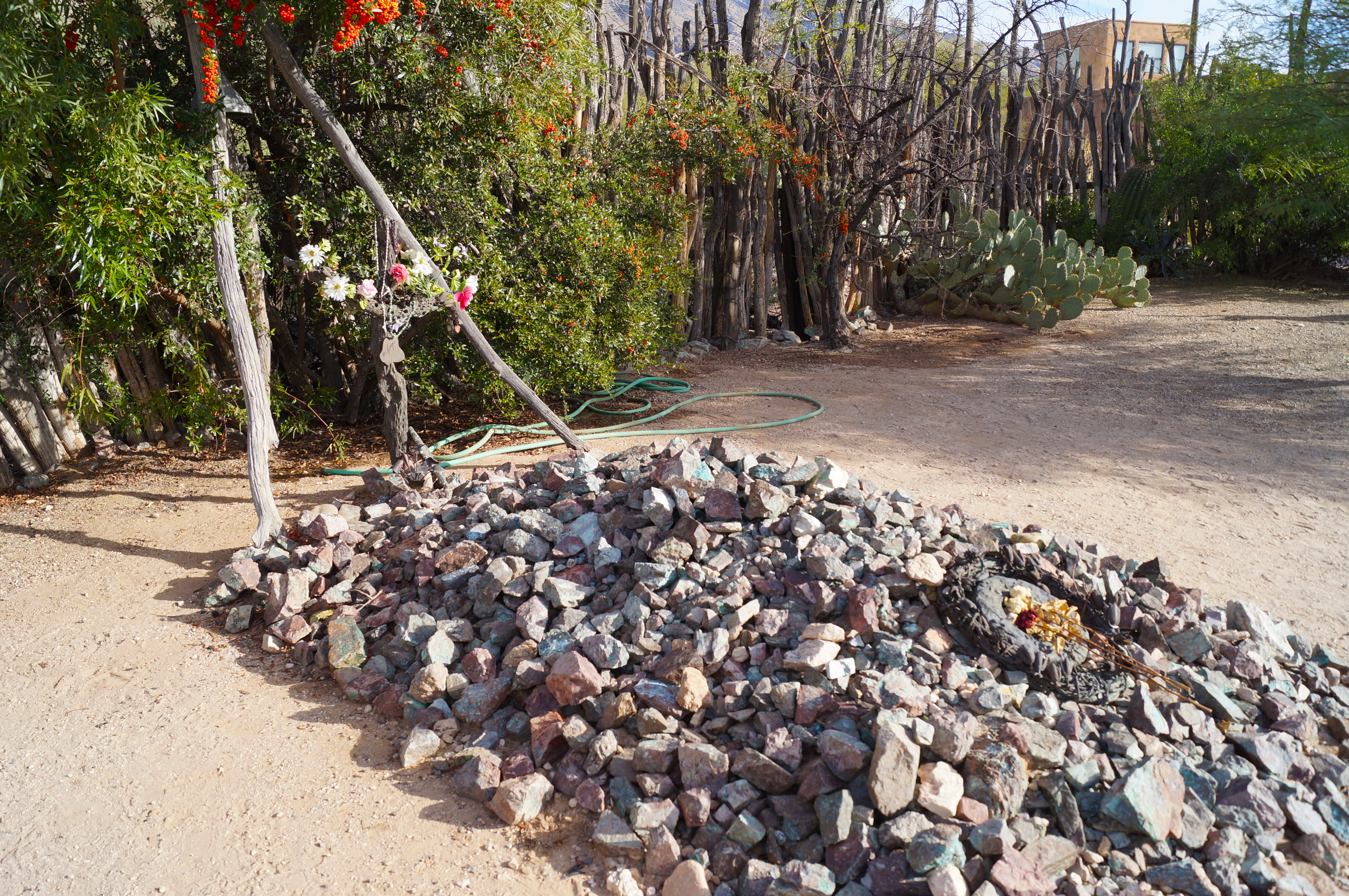
DeGrazia's grave site, located at the Gallery In the Sun
