= Katherine Kitt =

American artist and instructor (1876–1945)

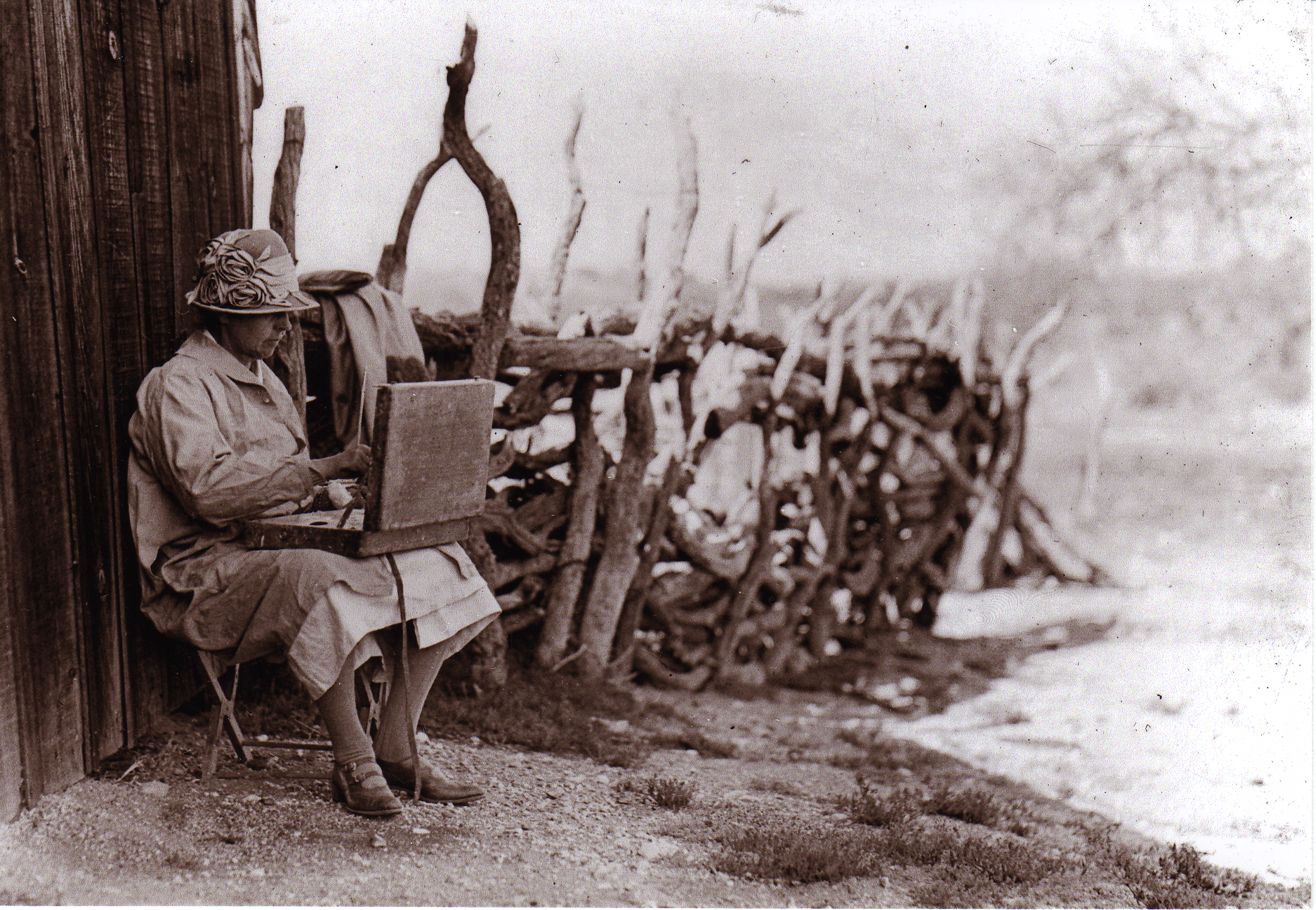
- Portrait of Katherine Kitt
- Born: Katherine Florence Daniels; 1872; Chico, California
- Died: 1945 (aged 72–73); Phoenix, Arizona
- Education: University of Arizona and private study.
- Known for: Art; Painting
- Movement: Regionalism, Modernism

Katherine “Kay” Florence Kitt (1876–1945), born Katherine Florence Daniels in Chico, California, was an artist and instructor who helped lead the establishment of an art colony in Tucson, Arizona in the early 1900s, created the School of Art at the University of Arizona, and shaped the art historical development of the Southwest in the early and twentieth century. Kitt was community leader, author, intellectual and pioneer who impacted generations of artists and helped launch and build many of Tucson’s cultural institutions.

== Life ==
Kitt was born in Chico, California, and educated at San Jose Normal School. In 1897, at the age of 21, she moved to Tucson taking a position teaching art at Safford School in downtown Tucson. Students remembered that: “The school was abuzz with anticipation of the new art teacher from faraway California.” A student reflected on Katherine's first day in a 1968 Tucson Daily Citizen story that “Her eyes were penetrating … almost hypnotic.”

In 1900 she married William “Will” Kitt, a son of the pioneer Arizona Kitt family – his father William F. Kitt was owner of the Congress Street Clothing Store and his aunt Philippa Kitt is memorialized in the name Kitt Peak. Katherine and William were given a lot of land as a wedding present in the Armory Park Historic Residential District at 319 S. Fourth Avenue in downtown Tucson. They commissioned architect Henry Trost to design a Greek Revival home. The art studio at the home would become an important location and salon for the exchange of ideas, exhibitions and artistic endeavors. Kitt received her bachelor of Arts degree from the University of Arizona in 1911 and her master's degree in 1928.

Katherine was an artistic pioneer in early twentieth century Tucson. She offered art classes in her Tucson studio before becoming a lecturer in Art at the University of Arizona in 1924. The art program was part of home economics, but within four years she led separation the program and established an independent Department of Art. Kitt headed the program for seventeen years retiring a month before her death.

In 1929 Kitt drafted the book Long Ago Told: Legends of the Papago Indians that was published under the authorship of Harold Bell Wright.

During prohibition she held art sessions in her studio, where she and her guests drank and smoked.

Kitt envisioned Tucson as an important center of art in the Southwest and United States and tirelessly worked to achieve that goal. She spent summers on Mount Lemmon and in Mexico, she made multiple trips to Europe and North Africa, painting scenes of Spain and Morocco. In 1932 she sailed San Sebastian, Spain, to study with Basque artist Ignacio Zuloaga. During the summer of 1942 she lived in Mexico City.

Kitt retired from the University of Arizona in 1945 and a month later at the age of 69 died from a cerebral hemorrhage at a hospital in Phoenix. She was called by the Tucson papers after he death an iconoclast.

== Legacy ==
Kitt’s impact on the development of art in Arizona and the southwest cannot be overstated. Her influence was derived from the countless students she taught at the University of Arizona, the salons held at her home. After her death in 1945, the Katherine Kitt Scholarship was established in honor of her role and leadership within the Department of Art. Student recipients of the scholarship included Abe Sotsky. Important students included artist Ettore DeGrazia, architect Gordon Luepke, and architect Lew Place.
