= Ross Santee =

American cowboy, author, and illustrator (1888–1965)

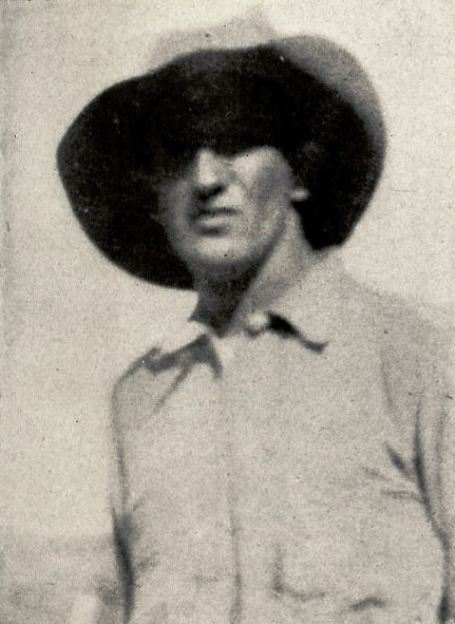
From a 1922 magazine

Ross Santee (August 16, 1888 – June 28, 1965) was a cowboy, writer, and illustrator. He specialized in works set in the U.S. state of Arizona.

== Biography ==
Born in Thornburg, Iowa, Santee's boyhood ambition was to become an artist and cartoonist. He studied at the School of the Art Institute of Chicago, but in early manhood found no demand for his work. Unemployed and discouraged, he drifted westward to central Arizona in 1915. The Grand Canyon State had been admitted to the Union only three years earlier, and major cattle spreads were still hiring frontiersmen to serve as cowboys.

The Eastern artist found that he could function as a horse wrangler, and began to put pen to paper to depict his new life. His Western-themed drawings were bought by magazines such as Arizona Highways, and he was given commissions by book publishers. His career as an illustrator moved from failure to commercial success, and he married Eve Farrell in 1926 and established residences in both Arizona and his wife's state of Delaware. He wrote Arizona-themed mass-market stories and novels in line with the themes of the works he illustrated. Critics classify his work as in line with literary realism rather than romanticism.

After becoming a widower in 1963, Santee closed his Delaware home and studio and consolidated his life in Arizona. In his final years he was significantly befriended by fellow illustrator Ted DeGrazia. He died in Globe, Arizona, in 1965.

== Bibliography ==
- Apache Land (1947)
- Cowboy (1928)
- Dog Days (1955)
- Hardrock and Silver Sage (1951)
- Lost Pony Tracks (1956)
- Men and Horses (1926)
- Rummy Kid Goes Home: and Other Stories of the Southwest (1965 anthology)
- Sleepy Black (1933)
- The Bar X Golf Course (1933)
- The Bubbling Spring (1949)
- The Pooch (1931)
- Wranglers and Rounders: The Cowboy Lore of Ross Santee (1981 anthology)

== Legacy ==
Ross Santee is identified by the Harry Ransom Center at the University of Texas at Austin as a significant figure of American culture in the 1920s. The primary collection of Ross Santee papers is in the Arizona Historical Society. A secondary collection of Santee papers can be found in the University of Arizona.
