= Ridings (surname) =

Ridings is the surname of the following people:

- Dave Ridings (born 1970), English football midfielder
- Freya Ridings (born 1994), English singer, songwriter, and multi-instrumentalist
- Gordon Ridings (1907–1958), American college basketball player and coach
- Holly Ridings (born 1973), American mechanical engineer and chief flight director at NASA
- Ken Ridings (1920–1943), Australian cricketer
- Phil Ridings (1917–1998), Australian cricketer, brother of Ken
- Richard Ridings (born 1958), British actor
- Stephen Ridings (born 1995), American baseball player
- Tag Ridings (born 1974), American golfer

== See also ==
- Riding (surname)
