= The Ride =

The Ride may refer to:

== Transportation ==
- The Ride (MBTA), Massachusetts Bay Transportation Authority's paratransit program
- RTD Bus & Rail in Denver, commonly referred to as TheRide
- TheRide, the common name of the Ann Arbor Area Transportation Authority

== Film and TV ==
- The Ride (1994 film), a 1994 Czech drama film
- The Ride (1997 film), a 1997 film starring Michael Biehn
- The Ride (2010 film), a documentary by Vice
- The Ride (2018 film), a 2018 film starring Ludacris
- The Ride (2022 film), a 2022 film starring Paul Sorvino
- "The Ride" (The Sopranos), a 2006 episode of The Sopranos
- The Ride (Forgotten Realms), an area of the Moonsea region in Forgotten Realms
- The Ride (TV series), a 2023 TV series about professional bull riding

== Music ==
- WXRC, a Charlotte, North Carolina, US radio station known as 95.7 The Ride

=== Albums ===
- The Ride (4Him album), 1994
- The Ride (Los Lobos album), 2004
- The Ride (Catfish and the Bottlemen album), 2016
- The Ride (Nelly Furtado album), 2017
- The Ride (Small Town Titans album), 2020

=== Songs ===
- "The Ride" (David Allan Coe song), 1983
- "The Ride" (Alec Empire song), 2002
- "The Ride" (Drake song), 2011
- "The Ride", a song by Amanda Palmer from There Will Be No Intermission, 2019
- "The Ride" (Rafał Brzozowski song), represented Poland in Eurovision Song Contest 2021

== See also ==
- Ride (disambiguation)
- Rider (disambiguation)
- Riders (disambiguation)
- Ryder (disambiguation)
- The Rider (disambiguation)
