= Ridings =

Ridings may refer to:

- Ridings (surname)
- Riding (division), an area of government, a division of a county or an electoral district
- The Ridings Centre, a shopping centre in Wakefield, West Yorkshire, UK
- The Ridings School in Halifax, West Yorkshire, UK
- The Ridings High School near Bristol, UK
- Ridings FM, a radio station serving the Wakefield District of West Yorkshire, England
- Yorkshire Ridings Society, a group calling for the wider recognition of the historic borders of Yorkshire
- Two Ridings Community Foundation, an English charity in Yorkshire
- Ridings Mill, Virginia, an unincorporated community in the United States
