= Ryder (disambiguation) =

Ryder is an American transportation company.

Ryder may also refer to:

== People and characters ==
- Ryder (name)
- Honey Ryder, a fictional character from the James Bond film Dr. No

== Places ==
- Ryder (crater), a lunar crater
- Ryder, Missouri, USA
- Ryder, North Dakota, USA
- Ryder Bay Islands Important Bird Area, Antarctica

== Groups, organizations ==
- Ryder (band), British male pop group
- Honey Ryder (band), British music group

== Other uses ==
- Ryder (novel), a 1928 novel by Djuna Barnes

== See also ==
- Ryder Cup, a biennial golf tournament
- Ride (disambiguation)
- Rider (disambiguation)
- Riders (disambiguation)
- Ryder Report (disambiguation)
- Red Ryder (disambiguation)
- The Ride (disambiguation)
- The Rider (disambiguation)
