= Red Rider (disambiguation) =

Red Rider is a Canadian rock band formed in 1975.

Red Rider or The Red Rider may also refer to:

== Film ==
- The Red Rider (1923 film), a German silent film directed by Franz W. Koebner
- The Red Rider (1925 film), an American silent Western film directed by Clifford Smith
- The Red Rider, a 1934 American Western film serial
- The Red Rider (1935 film), a German drama film directed by Rolf Randolf
- Red Riders of Canada, a 1928 film

== Groups, organizations ==
- Red Riders, an Australian rock band

== Other uses ==
- The Red Horse and Rider, of the four Horsemen of the Apocalypse
- Tom Cochrane and Red Rider, Red Rider's self titled album (1986)
- The Red Rider (novel) or Der rote Reiter, a 1922 dramatic novel by Franz Xaver Kappus

== See also ==
- Red Ryder (disambiguation)
- Rider (disambiguation)
- Red (disambiguation)
