= The Rider =

The Rider may refer to:

== Film and television ==
- The Rider (film), a 2017 western drama film by Chloé Zhao
- The Riders (film), an upcoming drama film by Edward Berger, based on the 1994 novel

=== Television episodes ===
- "The Rider", Death Valley Days season 14, episode 5 (1965)
- "The Rider", Fact Checkers Unit season 1, episode 6 (2010)
- "The Rider", Wander Over Yonder season 1, episode 21 (2014)

== Literature ==
- The Rider (novel), a 1918 novel by Edgar Rice Burroughs
- The Riders, a 1994 novel by Tim Winton

== Other uses ==
- The Rider (newspaper), student newspaper of the University of Texas Rio Grande Valley
- The Rider News, a weekly independent student newspaper of Rider University in Lawrenceville, New Jersey

== See also ==
- Ride (disambiguation)
- Rider (disambiguation)
- Riders (disambiguation)
- Ryder (disambiguation)
- The Ride (disambiguation)
