= History of the MBTA =

Story of mass transit in the Boston US area

MBTA "lollipop" logo, designed by Tom Geismar of CambridgeSeven architects in the 1960s. The group decided to nickname the service "The T" and modeled the logo after the Stockholm Metro's logo.

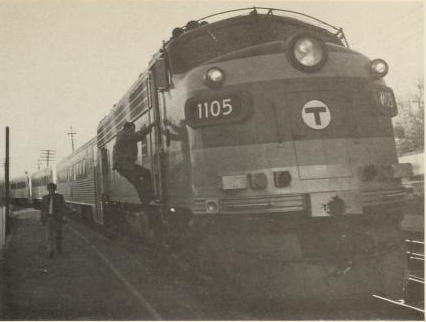
An MBTA train, c. 1979

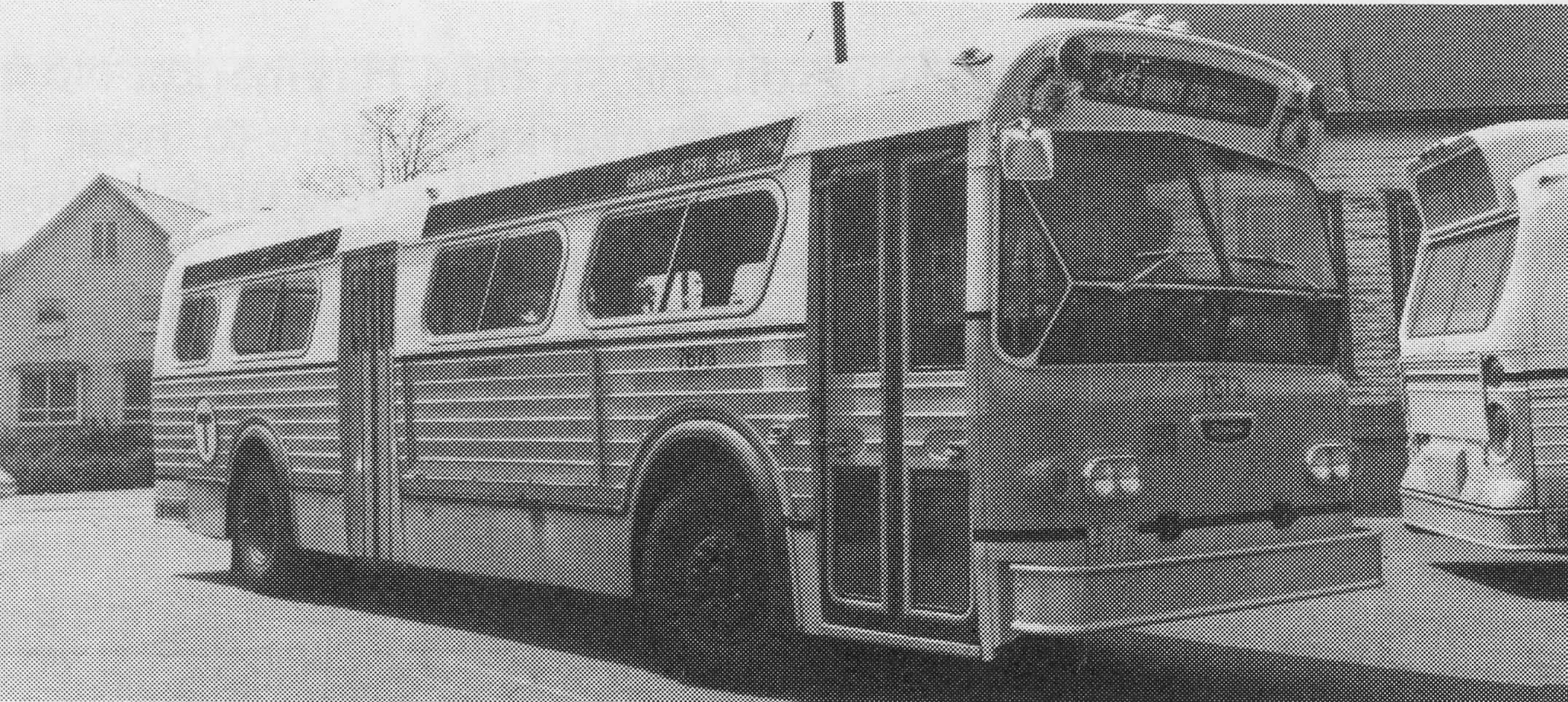
An MBTA bus, c. 1972

The history of the Massachusetts Bay Transportation Authority (MBTA) and its predecessors spans two centuries, starting with one of the oldest railroads in the United States. Development of mass transportation both followed existing economic and population patterns, and helped shape those patterns.

Privately owned mass transit in the Boston area evolved from the colonial period into the early 1900s, including ferries, steamships, steam commuter railroads, horse and electric streetcars, elevated railways, and subways. Many streetcar lines were consolidated into the West End Street Railway in 1887. This was merged into the Boston Elevated Railway in 1897, which that same year opened the first subway in the United States (the Tremont Street subway). Subway construction was funded by city taxpayers, and overseen by the new Boston Transit Commission. As automobiles started causing financial problems for mass transit operators, the MTA took over the BER in 1947 and began replacing inner commuter rail service with rapid transit expansions. The MTA started running ferry services in 1963. The MBTA replaced the MTA in 1964, expanding the service area to fully include the area's commuter rail services, all of which had to be taken over by the government or discontinued for financial reasons. Paratransit services began in 1977.

Except for the Mattapan Line and some portions of the Green Line, all streetcars were replaced by buses. The MBTA benefitted from a political turn away from highway construction in the 1970s, which resulted in relocation of part of the Orange Line. In the following decades, demand for mass transit services increased as the population migration out of the urban core toward the car-centric suburbs reversed, and overall population kept increasing.

The agency continued expanding and reactivating commuter rail services, and expanding rapid transit into the late 20th and early 21st century. The Big Dig (1991-2006) resulted in the creation of the Silver Line subway-busline and other promised expansions to mitigate the increased pollution caused by increased highway capacity (required after a Clean Air Act lawsuit by the Conservation Law Foundation). In 2000, the state changed the MBTA financing mechanism from habitually paying expenses in arrears to getting a fixed budget: 1% of state retail sales (out of a total 5% statewide sales tax at the time) plus assessments from cities and towns in the service area. Partly due to an increase in ecommerce, sales tax revenues were lower than expected, and because debt service for the Big Dig transit projects had been allocated to the MBTA, the agency experienced financial problems that required occasional supplemental state funding. It became a division of the newly consolidated MassDOT in 2009. During the term of Governor Charlie Baker (2015-2023), deferred subway system maintenance from the period of austerity became problematic. A 2015 snowstorm shut down two subway lines, resulting in temporary appointment of a Fiscal and Management Control Board. During the recovery from the COVID-19 pandemic, an accumulation of high-profile safety incidents resulted in a Federal Transit Administration investigation in 2022, and sudden safety-related service cuts.

== Early mass transit ==
Mass transit in Boston, Massachusetts began as a family-owned and operated ferry about the time of the founding of Boston, in around 1630. Ground transportation started in Boston with a private stagecoach operation in 1793.

== Steam railroads ==
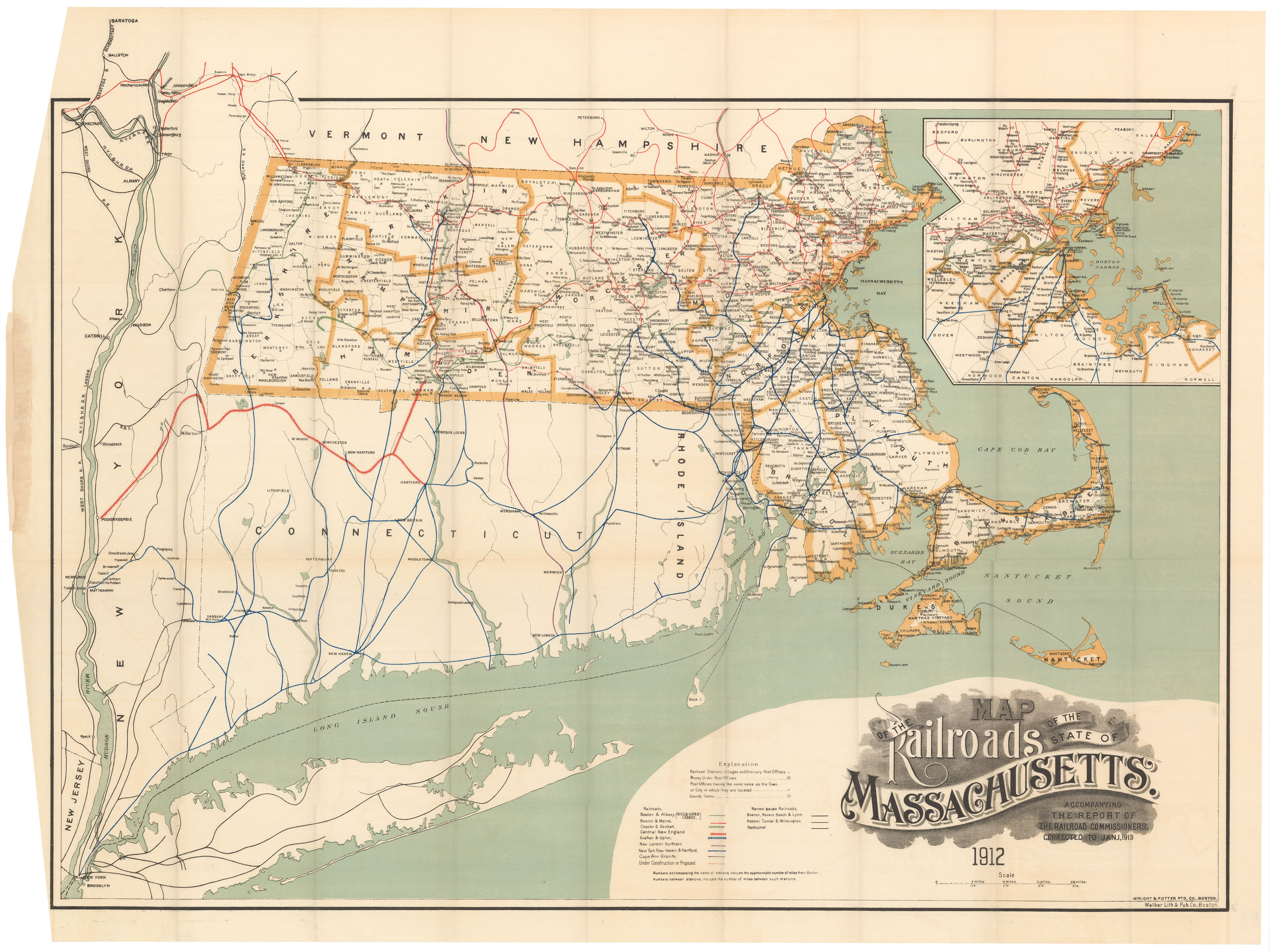
Suburban railroads around Boston in 1912. Boston and Maine Railroad lines are colored red, New York Central Railroad lines green, New York, New Haven and Hartford Railroad lines blue, and the Boston, Revere Beach and Lynn Railroad black.

The steam locomotive became practical for mass transportation in the 1810s and came to the United States in the 1820s. Three railroads were built from Boston to other industrial cities in 1834–35: the Boston and Lowell Railroad, Boston and Worcester Railroad, and Boston and Providence Railroad. There were soon eight intercity mainlines and numerous branches radiating from Boston. They were consolidated under three railroads in the last decades of the 19th century. Cuts from the 1910s to the 1950s ended service on many branches, but seven mainlines and several branches still had passenger service when the MBTA was formed in 1964.

=== Boston and Maine Railroad ===
Four of the current lines were part of the Boston and Maine Railroad (B&M):

- The Newburyport/Rockport Line descends from the Eastern Railroad, which opened from East Boston to Salem in 1838. It was extended to Ipswich in 1839, to Newburyport in 1840, and eventually to Portland, Maine in 1842. The entry into Boston was built in 1854. The Gloucester Branch was built from Beverly to Gloucester in 1847 and to Rockport in 1861. After a decades-long rivalry, the BM leased the Eastern in 1884. Passenger service on the Eastern Route mainline was cut back to Newburyport in 1965.
- The Haverhill Line descends from the Andover and Wilmington Railroad, which opened from Wilmington to Andover in 1836. It was extended to Bradford in 1837, to Exeter, New Hampshire, in 1840, and to Portland in 1843. A cutoff between Wilmington Junction and Boston was built in 1845, giving the B&M its own route into Boston. The Western Route became the spine of the B&M system. Passenger service was cut back to Dover, New Hampshire, in 1965 and to Haverhill in 1967.
- The Lowell Line descends from the Boston and Lowell Railroad (B&L), which opened in 1835. It was extended northwards by the Nashua and Lowell Railroad in 1838 and the Concord Railroad in 1842; both were later leased by the B&L. The B&M leased the B&L in 1887. Passenger service was cut back to Lowell in 1967.
- The Fitchburg Line descends from the Fitchburg Railroad, which opened in phases from West Cambridge to Fitchburg in 1843–1845. It acquired the previously-built Charlestown Railroad, which ran between West Cambridge and Charlestown, in 1844. A short extension into Boston opened in 1848. The Vermont and Massachusetts Railroad was extended west to Millers Falls and north to Brattleboro, Vermont, in 1851, and west from Millers Falls to Troy, New York, in 1876 via the Hoosac Tunnel. The B&M leased the Fitchburg in 1900. Passenger service was cut back to Fitchburg in 1960.

The B&M system also included three lines closed during the MBTA era – the Woburn Branch (1981), Lexington Branch (1977), and Central Massachusetts Branch (1971) – and numerous lines closed prior to 1964.

=== New York Central Railroad ===
One current line was part of the New York Central Railroad, which merged into the Penn Central Transportation Company in 1968:

- The Boston and Worcester Railroad opened from Boston to Worcester in stages in 1834–35. The Western Railroad opened in stages from Worcester to Albany, New York, in 1839–1841. The two railroads merged in 1867 as the Boston and Albany Railroad (B&A), which was acquired by the New York Central in 1900.

Several B&A branch lines closed prior to 1964. The Highland branch was closed in 1958 for conversion to a streetcar line, now the Green Line D branch. The freight-only Grand Junction Railroad, formerly owned by the B&A, is used by the MBTA for equipment moves.

=== New York, New Haven and Hartford Railroad ===
Seven of the current lines were part of the New York, New Haven and Hartford Railroad, which merged into Penn Central in 1969. Four were operated when the MBTA was formed:

- The Providence/Stoughton Line descends from the Boston and Providence Railroad (B&P), which opened between Boston and Providence in 1834–35. The New York, Providence and Boston Railroad (NYP&B) opened southwest from Providence in 1837, with a short connector into downtown Providence opened in 1848. The Stoughton Branch opened from Canton Junction to Stoughton in 1845. A new routing between Attleboro and Providence opened in 1847. The Old Colony Railroad acquired the B&P in 1888. The New Haven acquired an NYP&B successor in 1892 and the Old Colony in 1893, using the NYP&B and the B&P as part of its New York–Boston mainline (now part of the Northeast Corridor).
- The Fairmount Line descends from the Midland Railroad, which opened from Boston to Islington via Readville in 1855. It operated intermittently under several owners including the Boston and New York Central Railroad and Boston, Hartford and Erie Railroad until resuming full operation in 1867. The Boston, Hartford and Erie Railroad became part of the New York and New England Railroad (NY&NE) in 1875. The New Haven acquired an NY&NE descendant in 1898 and rerouted through trains onto the BP north of Readville. Boston–Readville service ended in 1944 and did not resume until the MBTA era.
- The Franklin/Foxboro Line descends from the Norfolk County Railroad, which opened between Dedham (on the B&P Dedham Branch) and Blackstone in 1849. It became part of the Boston and New York Central Railroad in 1853 and used the Midland Railroad (when operating) as its Boston entry after 1855. After several short-term operators, it became part of the Boston, Hartford and Erie Railroad in 1867. The New Haven cut back service to Franklin in 1966. The Franklin–Forge Park/495 segment of the current line originated in 1882 as part of the Milford and Woonsocket Railroad, which was leased by the NY&NE in 1887. Passenger service was intermittent after 1920 and was discontinued in 1940; it did not resume until the MBTA era. The Walpole–Foxboro segment of the current line opened as part of the Mansfield and Framingham Railroad in 1870 and became part of the Old Colony in 1879. Passenger service was discontinued in 1933 and did not resume until the MBTA era.
- The Needham Line descends from two originally-unrelated branch lines. The B&P opened its West Roxbury Branch between Forest Hills and Readville via West Roxbury in 1849. The Charles River Railroad opened from Newton Highlands to Needham in 1853, using the Highand branch to reach Boston. It was extended to Woonsocket, Rhode Island, in 1861–1863 and became part of the Boston, Hartford and Erie Railroad in 1865. The New Haven opened a cutoff from Needham Junction to West Roxbury in 1906. Service north of Needham Heights ended in 1932. Service south of Needham Junction (the Millis Branch) ended in 1967.

The New Haven ended all service on the Old Colony Division – the former Old Colony Railroad lines that were not part of the B&P – prior to formation of the MBTA. Service to Fall River, New Bedford, and Taunton via Stoughton ended in 1958. Service via Quincy ended in 1959, including three lines that were reactivated by the MBTA:

- The Kingston Line descends from the original Old Colony Railroad, which opened from Boston to Plymouth in 1845. It underwent several mergers, again becoming the Old Colony Railroad in 1872.
- The Middleborough/Lakeville Line descends from the Fall River Railroad, which opened from South Braintree to Fall River in 1846. It merged with the Old Colony in 1854. Passenger service between Middleborough and Myricks in 1931 and south of Myricks in 1958. The segments opening as part of South Coast Rail include the East Taunton–New Bedford portion of the New Bedford and Taunton Railroad (opened 1840, acquired by the Old Colony in 1879, passenger service ended 1958), the Middleborough and Taunton Railroad (opened 1856, acquired by the Old Colony in 1879, passenger service ended 1927), and the Myricks–Fall River portion of the Fall River Railroad.
- The Greenbush Line descends from the South Shore Railroad, which opened from Braintree to Cohasset in 1849. The Duxbury and Cohasset Railroad extended the line to South Duxbury in 1871 and Kingston in 1874. The Old Colony acquired the two lines in 1877 and 1878. Passenger service south of Greenbush ended in 1939.

Two New Haven lines closed in 1967 – the Dedham Branch and the Millis Branch. A number of other branches, particularly on the Old Colony Division, closed prior to the MBTA era. The Shawmut Branch and part of the Milton Branch were converted to a streetcar line and rapid transit extension (now the Mattapan Line and part of the Red Line) in 1926–1929.

=== Boston, Revere Beach and Lynn Railroad ===
The Boston, Revere Beach and Lynn Railroad opened from East Boston to Lynn in 1874. It was a narrow-gauge railroad that never extended beyond Lynn or interchanged freight with other railroads, depending on short-distance passenger traffic. The line was electrified in 1928 with frequent commuter service. All service ended in 1940. A portion of the right-of-way in East Boston and Revere was converted to a rapid transit extension – now part of the Blue Line – in the 1950s.

== Streetcar era ==
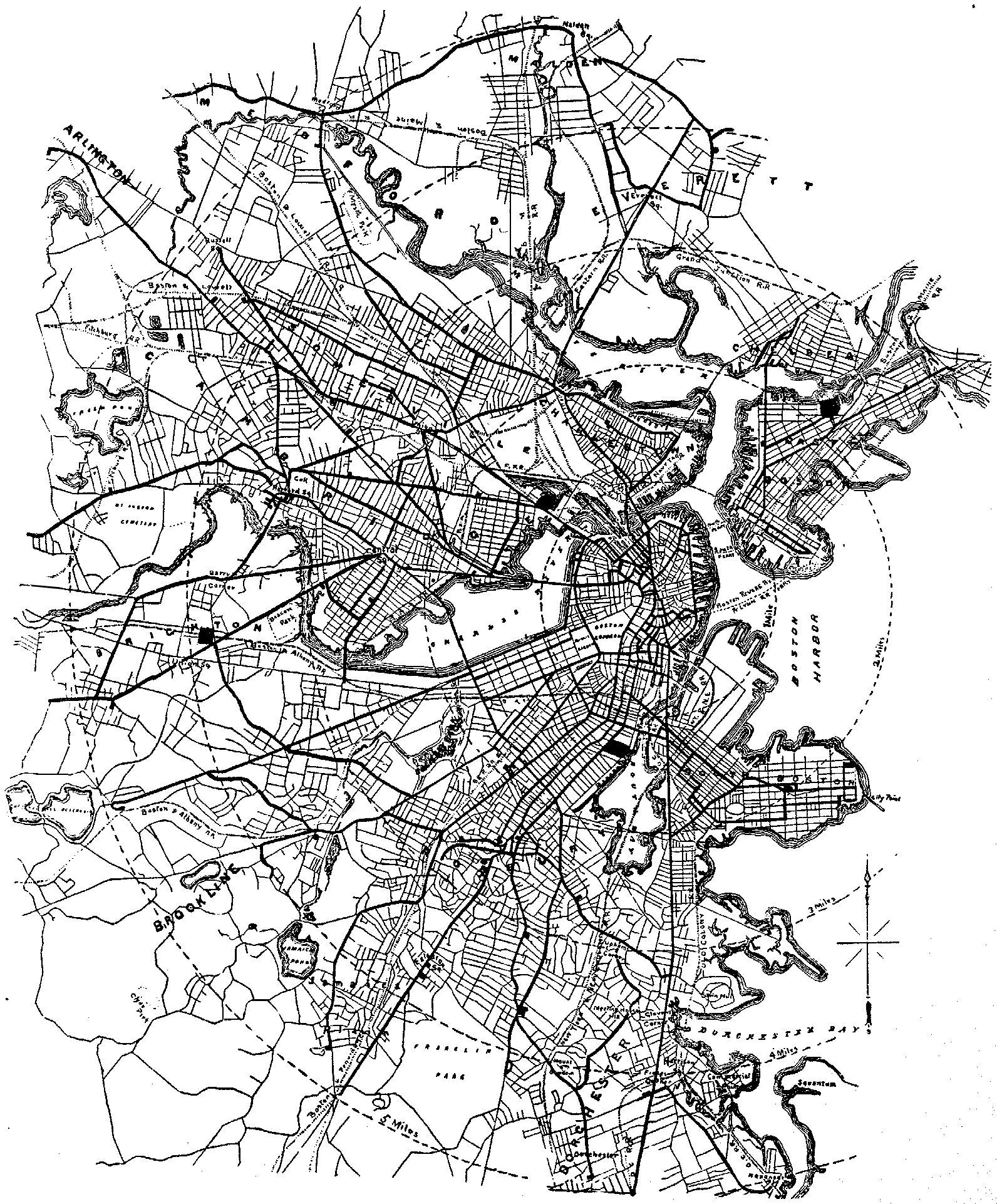
Planned West End Street Railway system, 1885; consolidation of these lines was complete by 1887. See also Boston horse railroads map.jpg 1880 horse railway map.

The Cambridge Railroad was the first streetcar company in Massachusetts. It was chartered in 1853 to connect the West End of Boston to Central Square and Harvard Square in Cambridge via the West End Bridge. (The bridge was replaced by the current Longfellow Bridge in early August 1906). This is the same route followed by today's Red Line subway, but on the surface street network. Using horse-drawn streetcars, the Cambridge Railroad started running on March 26, 1856. Another streetcar company, the Dorchester Railroad, was chartered in 1854. Over 20 streetcar lines were laid down throughout the Boston area by these and other competing companies.

In order to regulate fares and reduce competition, the General Court of Massachusetts passed the West End Consolidation Act to consolidate the rail line operations. This created the West End Street Railway in 1885. The company consolidated ownership of existing streetcar lines in Boston and the inner suburbs and began converting the animal-drawn vehicles to electric propulsion. In 1888, a blizzard hit the Northeastern United States called the Great Blizzard of 1888, creating rail and streetcar disturbances in New York City, Philadelphia, and other northeastern cities like Boston. The first electric trolleys ran in 1889, and the last horsecar went out of service around 1900.

In the late 19th century and early 20th century, two other streetcar companies gained consolidated ownership of many smaller lines. The Middlesex and Boston Street Railway came to control the western suburbs, and the Eastern Massachusetts Street Railway came to control the northern and southern suburbs.

== Streetcar subways and elevated rail ==
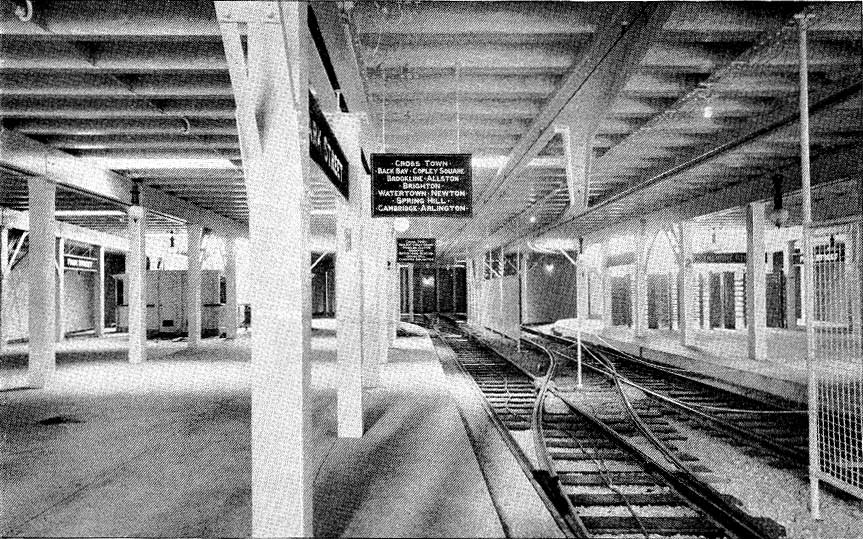
Park Street on the Green Line soon after opening, circa 1898

Severe streetcar congestion on streets in downtown Boston and the Great Blizzard of 1888 created the need for subways and elevated rail. These grade-separated railways would add transportation capacity, and avoid delays caused by intersections with cross streets and growing congestion in mixed street traffic. The West End Street Railway was renamed the Boston Elevated Railway (BERy), and undertook several such projects.

Boston's subway was the first in the United States and is often called "America's First Subway" by the MBTA and others. In 1897 and 1898, the Tremont Street subway opened as the core of the precursor to the Green Line.

In 1901, the Main Line Elevated, the precursor to the Orange Line opened. It was a rapid transit line running as an elevated railway through outlying areas and using the Tremont Street subway downtown, with the outer tracks and platforms reconfigured for Elevated trains. The Atlantic Avenue Elevated opened soon after, providing a second route through downtown. This was the first elevated railway and the first rapid transit line in Boston, three years before the first underground line of the New York City Subway, but some 33 years after the first elevated railway in New York.

In 1904, the next line to open was the East Boston Tunnel, a streetcar tunnel under Boston Harbor to East Boston. This replaced a transfer between streetcars and ferries and provided access to the other subways downtown. The tunnel was converted to rapid transit specifications in 1924, with an easy cross-platform streetcar transfer at the East Boston end. East Boston ferry continued to run until 1952.

In 1908, the Washington Street Tunnel opened, giving the Elevated a shorter route through downtown and returning the older Tremont Street subway to full streetcar service. Various extensions and branches were built to the Tremont Street subway in both directions, bypassing more surface tracks. In addition, when the Main Line El opened in 1901, many surface routes were cut back to its Dudley Square and Sullivan Square terminals to provide a transfer for a faster route downtown. Further elevated extensions, as with the Charlestown Elevated, were soon built on each end, and more streetcar lines were connected.

In 1912, the Cambridge Tunnel opened, connecting the Downtown Boston routes to Harvard Square in Cambridge. It was soon extended south from Downtown to Dorchester as the Dorchester Tunnel. The Dorchester Extension, opening in stages from 1927, took the line further along a former New York, New Haven and Hartford Railroad branch through Dorchester, with the Ashmont–Mattapan High Speed Line continuing along the old right of way to Mattapan. This, too, resulted in cutbacks in streetcar service to its terminals.

As built, many of the key rapid transit transfer stations were prepayment stations, in which free transfers could be made between surface streetcar lines and grade-separated subway or elevated lines. This was made possible by the operation of all services under one umbrella; some suburban services that operated over the same streetcar tracks used different areas outside fare control. Some of the streetcar levels in transfer stations were later converted for bus or trackless trolley operation; other such spaces have been closed. Some of the prepaid transfer areas still exist architecturally, and faregates enclose all subway stations (but not most above-ground Green Line stops).

Free in-station transfers were eliminated in October 1961, except among subway routes at the transfer stations in Downtown Boston. Transfers between bus and rapid transit were restored, in a limited capacity in 2000, and in full in 2007 as long as a CharlieCard is used. Transfers between bus and subway are reduced price but not free, while a single transfer between one local bus and another is free.

Prepayment streetcar stations included rapid transit transfer stations at Andrew, Ashmont, Broadway, Dudley, Egleston, Everett, Fields Corner, Forest Hills, Harvard, Lechmere, Massachusetts, Maverick, and Sullivan Square; surface-streetcar-only stations at Arborway, Kenmore, and Watertown Yard.

== Mid-20th century ==
=== Decline of streetcars and railroads ===
The Boston Elevated Railway started replacing rail vehicles with buses in 1922, a process later dubbed "bustitution". The last Middlesex and Boston Street Railway streetcars ran in 1930. The BERy started replacing some rail vehicles with trackless trolleys in 1936.

By the beginning of 1953, the only remaining streetcar lines fed two tunnels — the main Tremont Street subway network downtown and the short tunnel (now the Harvard bus tunnel) in Harvard Square. Diesel-powered buses could not be used in the tunnels due to the problem of venting exhaust fumes.

In 1958, the Harvard Square tunnel routes were replaced with electrically powered trackless trolleys, which were the only such MBTA routes. A short non-revenue connection from the terminus of the #71 trackless trolley out of Harvard Square runs to the Watertown Carhouse for maintenance. In the 21st century, with the new Phase 2 Silver Line in South Boston, trackless trolley services were extended for the first time in decades.

The old elevated railways proved to be an eyesore, and several sharp curves following Boston's twisty streets became more problematic because of severe speed limitations, high maintenance, and noise. The beginning of the decline of the Atlantic Avenue Elevated line was the Boston molasses disaster of 1919, which interrupted service on the line. After another serious accident in 1928, the Atlantic Avenue Elevated was partially closed, running as a stub shuttle. In 1938, it was completely shut down and then demolished for scrap metal in 1942.

In 1944, passenger service on the Fairmount Line was canceled by the New York, New Haven and Hartford Railroad after a long period of declining ridership. As rail passenger service became increasingly unprofitable, largely due to the increasingly popular automobile, government takeover became necessary to prevent abandonment of commuter rail services by bankrupt railroad companies.

=== MTA incorporation and takeovers ===
In 1947, the newly formed Metropolitan Transit Authority (MTA) purchased and took over subway, elevated, streetcar, and bus operations from the Boston Elevated Railway. The original MTA district consisted of 14 cities and towns — Arlington, Belmont, Boston, Brookline, Cambridge, Chelsea, Everett, Malden, Medford, Milton, Newton, Revere, Somerville, and Watertown.

A state commission headed by Lieutenant Governor Arthur W. Coolidge published in 1947 an ambitious plan to replace private commuter rail services (which were losing money) with higher-frequency electric rapid transit that would run roughly out to what is now the Massachusetts Route 128 corridor. The goal was to shift commuters from automobiles and buses and deal with the "intolerable traffic conditions in downtown Boston". The MTA successfully implemented a few rapid transit expansions, but progress was slowed as automobile ownership increased and the Federal-Aid Highway Act of 1956 diverted many commuters off of mass transit.

Between 1952 and 1954, the Revere Extension (now part of the Blue Line) opened to Wonderland, mostly along the former narrow-gauge Boston, Revere Beach and Lynn Railroad right-of-way.

In 1959, MTA streetcar service opened on what is now the Riverside Green Line D branch, connecting to the Boylston Street subway and using trackage purchased from the New York Central Railroad, which had stopped running on the line the previous year. The new service required much more rolling stock than expected, due to heavy ridership.

Also in 1959, with the opening of the Southeast Expressway, the New York, New Haven and Hartford Railroad halted passenger service on the former Old Colony Railroad lines. The replacement rapid transit service did not open until a dozen years later, with the service finally going just beyond the new Expressway's southern end nine years afterward.

Meanwhile, the last two streetcar lines running into the Pleasant Street Portal of the Tremont Street subway were replaced with buses in 1953 and 1962, and the portal has since been covered over by a public park.

When the MTA reintroduced year-round ferry service to Hull in 1963 (now part of the MBTA ferry system), it was the only commuter-focused ferry service in the United States.

== MBTA incorporation ==
=== Formation and commuter rail takeovers ===
On August 3, 1964, the MBTA succeeded the MTA, with an enlarged service area of 78 cities and towns. A 79th community (Maynard) joined in or before 1972 and left in or after 1976.

The MBTA was formed partly to subsidize existing commuter rail operations, provided at that time by three private railroad companies — the Boston and Maine Railroad, the New York Central Railroad (via the Boston and Albany Railroad), and the New York, New Haven and Hartford Railroad — with the B&M running the north-side lines and the NYC and NYNH&H (both merged into Penn Central in 1968, and taken over by Conrail in 1976) on the south side. The MBTA soon began to subsidize the companies, and acquired the lines in stages from 1973 through 1976, but with major cutbacks in service and coverage area. Since then, many of these lines have seen service return, most notably the Old Colony Railroad (NYNH&H) lines to the South Shore.

By 1964, commuter rail service to Worcester was being provided. In 1965, the Boston and Maine Railroad started receiving MBTA subsidies for its commuter service. In 1973, the MBTA bought most of its present-day commuter rail trackage from the Boston and Maine Railroad and Penn Central (into which the New York Central Railroad and the New York, New Haven and Hartford Railroad had merged). It also purchased rolling stock at this time. Trackage between Framingham and Worcester was not acquired by the agency, and due to a lack of state subsidy, commuter rail service on this portion was cut in 1975. Service was resumed in 1994, though the track was still privately owned until the state purchased it from CSX Transportation in 2011. The Fairmount Line was purchased from Penn Central in 1976. Passenger service resumed there in 1979 during diversion of other lines during Southwest Corridor construction and was continued even after the project was complete.

=== Bus expansion and streetcar cutbacks ===
In 1965, the MBTA assigned colors to its four rapid transit lines on the advice of the CambridgeSeven architectural consulting group, and lettered the branches of the Green Line from north to south. However, shortages of streetcars, among other factors, eventually caused bus substitution of rail service on two branches of the Green Line. In 1969, the A branch was replaced by bus service in its entirety. In 1985, the portion of the E branch from Heath Street to Arborway was replaced by buses.

In 1968, the MBTA purchased bus routes in the outer suburbs to the north and south, from the Eastern Massachusetts Street Railway. Western suburban routes were purchased in 1972 from the Middlesex and Boston Street Railway. (Both of these companies had long since ceased running any streetcar service). A few routes to the north were taken over from Service Bus Lines in 1975, and one in the south in 1980 from the Brush Hill Transportation Company. As with the commuter rail system, many of the outlying routes were dropped soon before or after the takeover, due to low ridership and high operating costs, and out-of-district communities' refusal to join or contract with the MBTA.

=== Rapid transit expansion ===
In the 1970s, the MBTA received a boost from the BTPR areawide re-evaluation of the role of transit relative to highways. Following a moratorium on major highway construction inside Route 128, numerous transit lines were planned for expansion by the Voorhees-Skidmore, Owings and Merrill-ESL consulting team.

The Charlestown Elevated, part of the Orange Line north of downtown Boston, was replaced by the Haymarket North Extension in 1975.

The Braintree extension, a branch of the Red Line to Braintree, opened in stages from 1971 to 1980, upgrading an existing rail corridor. The Red Line Northwest Extension to Alewife opened in 1985, with an intermediate opening in 1984, partly along a railroad corridor and partly through a newly built deep-bore tunnel.

The southern part of the Washington Street Elevated lasted until 1987 when the Southwest Corridor was opened, rerouting service from discontinued elevated trackage to new facilities in a parallel existing rail corridor. The closure of the Washington Street Elevated south of downtown Boston brought the end of rapid transit service to the Roxbury neighborhood, which was eventually replaced with the Silver Line bus rapid transit.

These extensions provided not only additional subway system coverage but also major parking structures at several of the terminal and intermediate stations. For example, the Route 2 freeway ends at the Red Line terminus, Alewife station, where there is a large parking garage operated by the MBTA.

With the 2004 replacement of the Causeway Street Elevated by a subway tunnel connection, the only remaining elevated railways are a short portion of the Red Line at Charles/MGH, and a short portion of the Green Line between Science Park and Lechmere.

== 21st century ==
=== MBTA expansion and the Big Dig ===
In 1999, the district was expanded further to 175 cities and towns, adding most communities that were served by or adjacent to Commuter Rail lines (again including Maynard). The MBTA did not assume responsibility for local transit service in those communities, some of which run their own buses, and some of which depend on private bus services.

Prior to July 1, 2000, the MBTA had been automatically reimbursed by the Commonwealth of Massachusetts for all costs above revenue collected (net cost of service). Beginning on that date, the T was granted a dedicated revenue stream consisting of amounts assessed on served cities and towns, along with a dedicated 20% portion of the 5% state sales tax. Going forward, the MBTA now would have to live within this "forward funding" budget.

The Commonwealth assigned to the MBTA responsibility for increasing public transit to compensate for increased automobile pollution from the Big Dig. The T submerged a nearby portion of the Green Line and rebuilt Haymarket and North Stations during Big Dig construction. However, these projects have strained the MBTA's limited resources, since the Big Dig project did not include funding for these improvements. Since 1988, the MBTA has been the fastest expanding transit system in the country, even as Greater Boston has been one of the slowest growing metropolitan areas in the United States. When, in 2000, the MBTA's budget became limited, the agency began to run into debt from scheduled projects and obligatory Big Dig remediation work, which have now given the MBTA the highest debt of any transit authority in the country. In an effort to compensate, rates underwent an appreciable hike on January 1, 2007. Increasingly, local advocacy groups are calling on the state to assume $2.9 billion of the authority's now approximate debt of $9 billion, the interest on which severely limits funds available for required projects.

In 2006, the creation of the MetroWest Regional Transit Authority saw Framingham, Natick, Weston, Sudbury, Wayland, Marlborough, Ashland, Sherborn, Hopkinton, Holliston, and Southborough subtract their MWRTA assessment from their MBTA assessment. Communities that are also members of other RTAs such as CATA, MVRTA, LRTA, WRTA, GATRA, and BAT may also subtract their RTA assessment from their MBTA assessment. The amount of funding the MBTA received remained the same; the assessment on remaining cities and towns increased but is still allocated by the same formula. On October 31, 2007, the MBTA reestablished commuter rail service to the Greenbush section of Scituate, the third branch of the Old Colony service. Rail renovation on the Green Line D branch took place in the summer of 2007. New, low-floor cars on the line were introduced on December 1, 2008.

In 2008, Daniel Grabauskas, then the MBTA General Manager, revealed that the MBTA cut trips from published train and bus schedules without informing passengers, referred to as “hidden service cuts”, saying this misrepresentation of service had been happening for years. Grabauskas said this practice has been ended.

On June 26, 2009, Governor Deval Patrick signed a law to place the MBTA along with other state transportation agencies within the administrative authority of the Massachusetts Department of Transportation (MassDOT), with the MBTA now part of the Mass Transit division (MassTrans). The 2009 transportation law continued the MBTA corporate structure and changed the MBTA board membership to the five Governor-appointed members of the Mass DOT Board.

Rhode Island, which has funded commuter rail service to Providence since 1988, paid for extensions of the Providence/Stoughton Line to T.F. Green Airport in 2010 and Wickford Junction in 2012. The Fairmount Line, located entirely in the southern reaches of Boston, has been undergoing an improvement project since 2002. The first new station, Talbot Avenue, opened in November 2012.

=== Debt concerns, route cutbacks, and fare increases ===
Claims have been made by the Pioneer Institute that since 1988 the MBTA has been the fastest expanding transit system in the country, even as Greater Boston has been the slowest growing metropolitan area. However, research by the Frontier Group finds that "no category has the MBTA been the “fastest-growing” of the nation's largest transit agencies, and in only two categories does it crack the top 10. However, the MBTA does crack the top 10 in another category: absolute growth in transit ridership."

When, in 2000, the MBTA's income was capped, the agency began to run up large debts from already-scheduled projects and obligatory Big Dig remediation work. As of 2012, the MBTA has the highest debt of any transit authority in the United States. In an effort to compensate, rates were hiked on January 1, 2007, from $1.25 up to $2.00 per subway ride with a CharlieTicket, and $1.70 with a CharlieCard. Increasingly, local advocacy groups are calling on the state to assume $2.9 billion of the authority's debt, which totals approximately $9 billion. The interest on this debt is a large proportion of the MBTA's annual expenses, and severely limits funds available for any further required projects.

In April 2012, the MBTA Advisory Board approved major fare increases on all MBTA services, and cutbacks or terminations of some transit routes. In July 2014, fares were increased further by an average of 5%.

==== T-Radio ====
On October 10, 2007, the MBTA introduced a pilot program in North, South, and Airport stations called T-Radio. The program would have been expanded to pipe in music, light news, weather, entertainment tips, and eight to ten minutes of commercials each hour to every MBTA subway station. After the agency received an overwhelming number of e-mails — 1,800, mostly complaints — it decided to shelve the program on October 25.

=== Major incidents ===
On May 28, 2008, a westbound trolley on the Green Line D branch slammed into a stopped train between the Waban and Woodland stations shortly after 6 p.m. At least seven people were injured, and the operator of the moving train, Terrese Edmonds, 24, was killed. On May 8, 2009, two Green Line trolleys collided between Park Street and Government Center when the driver of one of them, 24-year-old Aiden Quinn, was text messaging his girlfriend. A rule banning cell phones for operators while driving their bus, train, or streetcar was put into place days later.

Immediately following the Boston Marathon bombing, the MBTA was partially shut down and National Guardsmen were deployed in various stations around the city. During the ensuing manhunt for Dzhokhar and Tamerlan Tsarnaev the MBTA was fully shut down until the stay-inside request for Watertown, Newton, Waltham, Cambridge, Belmont, and Boston was lifted. During the manhunt, MBTA buses were used to ferry police around the city. After the suspect was caught the MBTA resumed normal service. The next day the MBTA began displaying "BOSTON STRONG" and "WE ARE ONE BOSTON" on buses and subway cars, in addition to the destination that is normally displayed.

=== Charlie Baker administration (2015–2023) ===
==== Crisis and appointment of control board ====
In February 2015, there was record breaking snowfall in Boston from the 2014–15 North American winter causing a partial shutdown and severe delays on all MBTA subway lines, and many long-term operational and financial problems with the entire MBTA system came under greater public attention. Massachusetts Governor Charlie Baker indicated at the time that he was reluctant to discuss the financing issues but that he would "have more to say about that in a couple of weeks."

Following criticism of his emergency management and polling demonstrating public opinion in favor of his administration prioritizing resolving the MBTA's issues, Baker announced the formation of a special advisory panel to diagnose the MBTA's problems and write a report recommending proposals to address them. The special advisory panel released its report that April. The report was broadly critical of MBTA operational and financial management, noting that the system was in "severe financial distress", was "governed ineffectively", spent inefficiently, and had a high-absentee workplace culture. Among other reforms, the report recommended suspending the governance of the agency by the MassDOT Board of Directors; replacing it with a temporary Fiscal and Management Control Board directly appointed by the Governor and the leadership of the state legislature; expanding the existing MassDOT Board; and adding term limits. The MassDOT Board resigned on Baker's request the following week. Legislation, which closely followed the report's recommendations, passed the following July along with the appointment of the Fiscal and Management Control Board. Baker also appointed a new MassDOT Board of Directors and proposed a five-year, $83 million winter resiliency plan.

==== Governance ====
After initially blaming the snowfall and a lack of public investment in an aging system for the crisis, MBTA General Manager Beverly Scott announced her resignation effective April 11. MassDOT Chief Operating Officer and Highway Division Administrator Frank DePaola was appointed to fill Scott's position. DePaola retired June 30, 2016, and was replaced with Brian Shortsleeve. Shortsleeve swapped positions with Fiscal and Management Control Board vice chair Steve Poftak on June 30, 2017. Baker launched a search for a permanent MBTA General Manager in February 2017.

That August, the MBTA named former General Electric executive Luis Ramirez to be its new general manager. Ramirez's previous management experience, as well as the process for vetting him, came under public scrutiny and criticism because of a twice-dismissed class action lawsuit during his tenure as CEO of the Dallas-based Global Power Equipment Group. Even so, Baker spoke in favor of Ramirez, who began his tenure as MBTA General Manager on September 12, 2017. Ramirez left the position effective January 1, 2019, and was replaced by Steve Poftak. In June 2021, the Fiscal and Management Control Board was dissolved, and the following month, Baker signed into law a supplemental budget bill that included a provision creating a permanent MBTA Board of Directors and Baker appointed the new board the following October.

Injuries involving a Green Line collision and Back Bay escalator malfunction, a dragging death on the Red Line, a fatal Commuter Rail collision with a car, and a death resulting from a fall through a rusty staircase attracted considerable public attention. In April 2022, the Federal Transit Administration announced in a letter to general manager Poftak that it would assume an increased safety oversight role over the MBTA and would conduct a safety management inspection.

The FTA soon found subway dispatchers working 20-hour shifts due to a staffing shortage. The MBTA cut rush hour service frequency on the Red, Blue, and Orange Lines to allow dispatchers and subway supervisors adequate rest. Federal inspectors also issued emergency directives concerning runaway trains in yards, and the backlog of track maintenance, which caused about 10% of the subway system to be under speed restriction. After an Orange Line train fire endangered hundreds of passengers and caused one to jump off a bridge into the Mystic River, the MBTA decided to shut down the entire Orange Line for 30 days to accelerate track work and re-open with all new subway cars. In December 2022, the Orange Line was unable to meet even its reduced schedule when about half the trains were pulled from service without notice to passengers, due to problems with electrical arcing.

The full FTA safety report released in August 2022 demanded an increase in staffing and retention of senior employees; collection of, prioritization of, and decision-making based on safety-related risks, failures, and precursors; clarification of safety communication-related procedures for frontline workers; oversight of failures to implement safety requirements; more resources for formal technical training; addressing radio dead zones; more independent quality assurance; more active and independent safety oversight by the Massachusetts Department of Public Utilities.

==== Service cuts and improvements ====
In June 2015, the MBTA scaled back the schedule for a one-year pilot program to expand late-night service on weekends, having expanded it that February. The program was cut in March 2016. Despite this setback, improvements were made to service during this time. In October 2015, the MBTA announced that the Commuter Rail was adding nonstop trips during peak commute times along the Framingham/Worcester Line between Back Bay and Worcester Union Stations. In March 2016, the MBTA reopened Government Center Station after two years of construction upgrades. In September 2016, a month after Baker signed into law a regulatory framework for ridesharing companies, Baker and the MBTA announced a pilot program partnering the MBTA's The Ride with Uber and Lyft to improve paratransit services for disabled riders, which was expanded the following February to all users of The Ride.

In December 2016, the MBTA Fiscal and Management Control Board approved a proposal to replace all MBTA Red Line fleet vehicles by 2025. In January 2017, the MBTA announced that the new Boston Landing Station on the Commuter Rail's Framingham/Worcester Line would open the following May. A groundbreaking for the $38.5 million renovation of Ruggles Station, in Roxbury, occurred that August. In April 2017, the Federal Transit Administration approved a revised cost estimate for the Green Line Extension proposed by the MBTA Fiscal and Management Control Board and the MassDOT Board of Directors, allowing the project to be eligible for federal funding. The Green Line Extension broke ground in Somerville in June of the following year.

In April 2018, the MBTA began a one-year pilot program for early morning bus service along certain MBTA bus routes in Boston (which the Fiscal and Management Control Board voted to make permanent the following December), and the MBTA Silver Line began operating a route from Chelsea to South Station. In June 2018, the MBTA began a 3-month pilot of a summer weekend Commuter Rail fare of $10 for unlimited use, which was subsequently extended another three months. Also in June 2018, the MBTA announced parking fee changes based on parking lot usage, and the MBTA released estimates showing that the proposed North–South Rail Link would cost between $12.3 billion and $21.5 billion. In January 2019, following a one-month hiatus, MBTA General Manager Steve Poftak announced that the Federal Transit Administration approved a six-month extension of the Commuter Rail weekend fare pilot beginning that month, which the Fiscal and Management Control Board voted to make permanent the following March.

==== Budget balancing and fares ====
In August 2015, MBTA officials released revised estimates of the MBTA's State-of-Good-Repair backlog upwards to $7.3 billion. While MBTA officials announced the following month that advertising revenue was running 26 percent higher that year than at the same time the previous year, the Fiscal and Management Control Board released its first report. The board report showed that the MBTA's operating expenses and debt service were growing nearly three times the rate of revenue growth—being projected to grow from a projected $170 million in fiscal year 2016 to a projected $427 million by fiscal year 2020 if left unaddressed—and that operator absences accounted for 69 percent of the 34,347 dropped bus runs and subway trips between January and August of that year. The Fiscal and Management Control Board voted to increase fares across the system by an average of 9.3 percent that March. However, according to an April 2016 estimate, the agency was losing $42 million per year due to fare evasion (amounting to approximately one-fourth of the agency's $170 million operating budget deficit in fiscal year 2016). In June 2016, the MBTA Fiscal and Management Control Board voted unanimously to indefinitely extend a pilot program of discounted passes for low-income youths and to increase the maximum age for participation in the program to 25.

In July 2016, after the Fiscal and Management Control Board completed its first year, Baker addressed the status of MBTA operations and financial management. There was significant progress, including a leveling of the MBTA operating expense budget between the 2015 and 2016 fiscal years (after a 5 percent per year increase over the previous 15 years), a 25 percent decline in operator absenteeism, a 30 percent decline in overtime expenses, a one-third decline in dropped bus runs, and improvements to system infrastructure. However, at the same time, Baker noted that the MBTA was "still in very tough shape", reiterating concerns about the MBTA pension system, the security of the MBTA's cash-handling operations, need for reform to the MBTA's procurement and contracting system, and improvements to its infrastructure maintenance system highlighted in the advisory panel report. Also in July 2016, Baker signed into law a bill capping MBTA fare increases to 7 percent once every two years.

In October 2016, the MBTA Fiscal and Management Control Board voted to outsource the MBTA's cash-handling operations to the security company Brink's on a $18.7 million, five-year contract, a decision opposed by unions and elected officials. The MBTA also extended its existing contract with the Boston Carmen's Union in December 2016 through 2021 with new wage structures that would reduce the MBTA's operating budget by $80 million over the subsequent four years. The following month, the agency outsourced its warehousing and parts-delivery operations to an external vendor for $28.4 million on a five-year contract.

In April 2017, the Fiscal and Management Control Board approved a $1.98 billion budget which reduced the MBTA operating budget deficit from $42 million to $30 million. The following month, Baker approved the Fiscal and Management Control Board's request to exercise the two-year extension option to continue its governance of the MBTA allowed under the law that authorized its formation. In July 2017, interim MBTA General Manager Steve Poftak said that the MBTA would accelerate its capital spending from an average of $437 million (excluding expansion projects) in the previous five years to $702 million for fiscal year 2019. Simultaneously, Poftak also noted that the MBTA was "saving money" by outsourcing "ancillary" operations to vendors.

In November 2017, the MBTA Fiscal and Management Control Board voted to award a 13-year contract for $723 million to the Cubic Corporation to design, implement, and operate a new fare collection system for the MBTA by 2020. In February 2018, MBTA General Manager Luis Ramirez announced to the Fiscal and Management Control Board that the MBTA would face a $111 million operating budget deficit for fiscal year 2019. However, that August, MBTA officials announced that the agency had finished the 2018 fiscal year with a balanced operating budget for the first time in a decade.

==== COVID-19 pandemic ====
In February 2020, the COVID-19 pandemic began to impact Massachusetts. When the stay-at-home advisory was issued the following month, businesses closed or sent staff to work from home, and people were advised to avoid riding public transit unless necessary. At the lowest point, MBTA ridership dropped about 78% on buses, 92% on the subway, on 71% paratransit, and 97% on commuter rail. Bus and subway ran on a modified Saturday schedule; commuter rail was on a reduced schedule and ferries were shut down completely. To facilitate social distancing from drivers, buses started running fare-free with rear-door-only boarding, passengers were required to wear face masks (except small children and people with relevant medical conditions), and the agency began frequently sanitizing vehicles and stations. Driver availability was limited as some employees contracted the virus. The T received $827 million in federal aid for FY2020 and FY2021 to make up for increased costs and lost revenue.

In June, the MBTA announced that commuter rail tickets and passes valid as of March 10 would be valid for 90 days, starting on June 22. It also made various fare changes to encourage riders to shift from potentially crowded bus or subway, including discounted ten-ride tickets, half-price tickets for youth, and Zone 1A fares extended to Lynn and River Works stations.

==== 2021 budget proposal ====
Due to the COVID-19 pandemic, ridership on the MBTA has declined by 87% which has forced Massachusetts legislators and the MBTA to potentially implement a plan that would eliminate weekend commuter rail services and shut it down after 9 p.m. on weeknights, eliminate 25 bus routes, stop subway and bus services at midnight, among other changes to scale back services. This plan, if implemented through a vote by the Fiscal and Management Control Board, would save Massachusetts more than $130 million. The loss in services could potentially mean that up to 1,700 riders will not be able to take the bus and 733 riders will not be able to take the train. Supporters of this plan believe that this is the best plan as the majority of ridership has decreased due to the pandemic and it is not feasible to continue providing services that would not be used, especially if there are alternatives to using public transportation, such as personal vehicles. Through saving money by cutting services, the city is planning on using the money for services once the pandemic has ended. Supporters claim that reduced services will still be sufficient for those who still rely on public transport during the pandemic. Changes would not be implemented right away, rather, they could slowly be introduced, with the earliest changes coming in January 2021 and other changes coming as late as summer 2021. This allows the MBTA to adjust service needs based on ridership needs. On the other hand, opponents argue that by reducing services, it will be harder for riders, who are typically low-income or people of color to get to essential jobs. Riders will be forced to find other ways of transportation, which could mean using personal vehicles, leading to an increase in dependence on the automobility paradigm. Opponents argue that public transportation should be treated as a public good, which means asking wealthier people and corporations to pay their share for the upkeep of transportation as a way to achieve mobility justice.

== Maps gallery ==
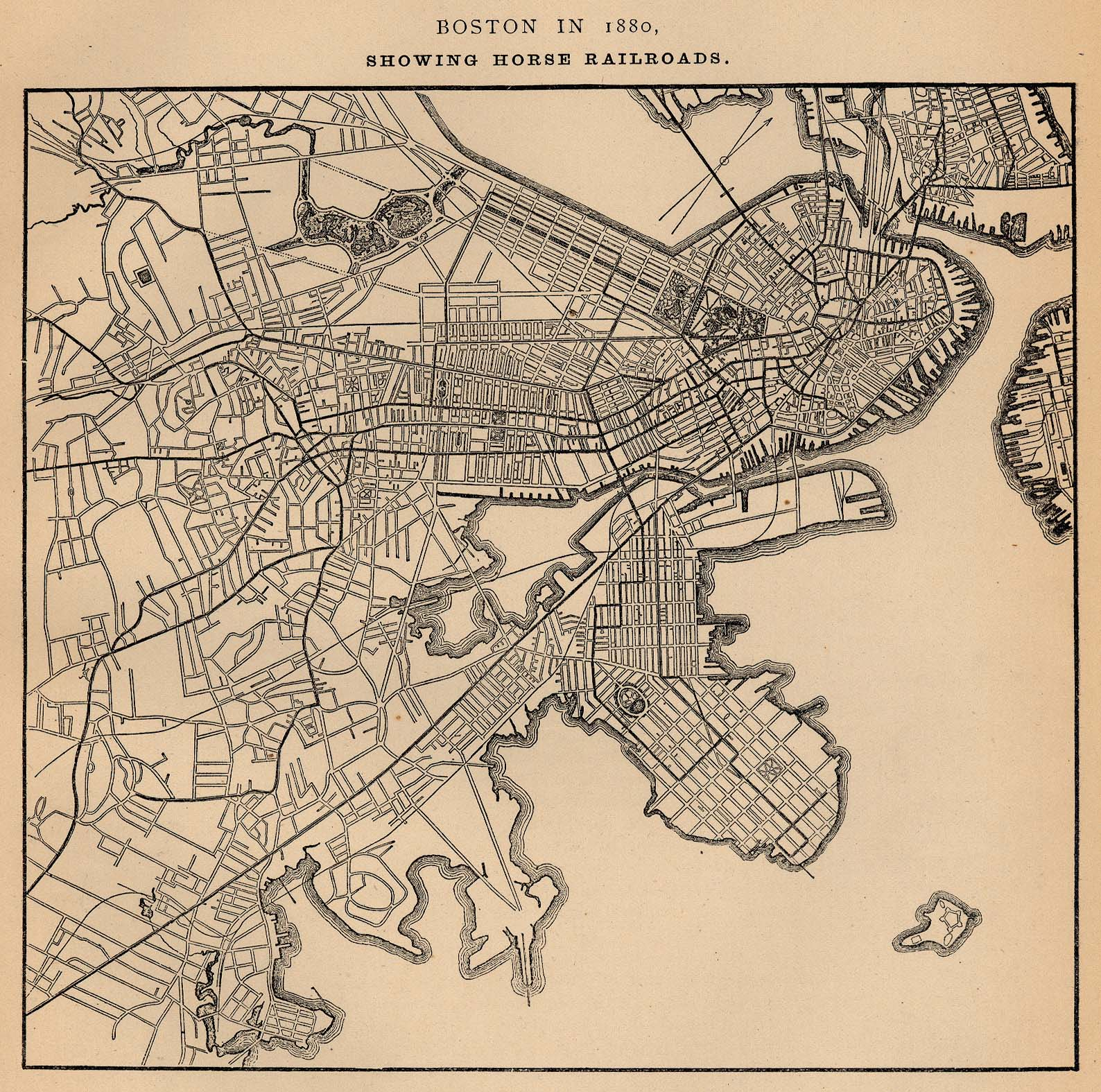
Boston in 1880, highlighting horse railroads

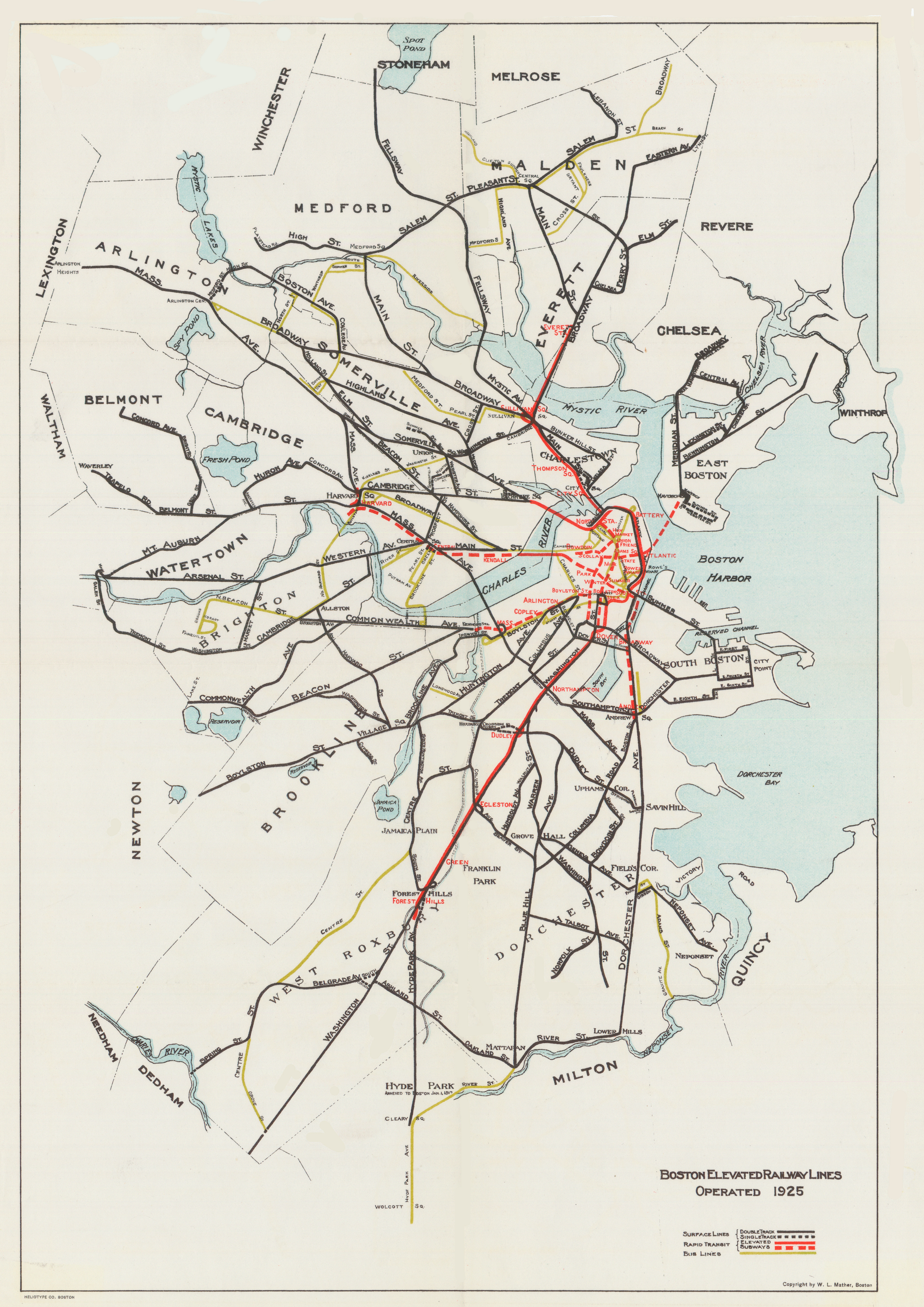
1925 Boston Elevated Railway map

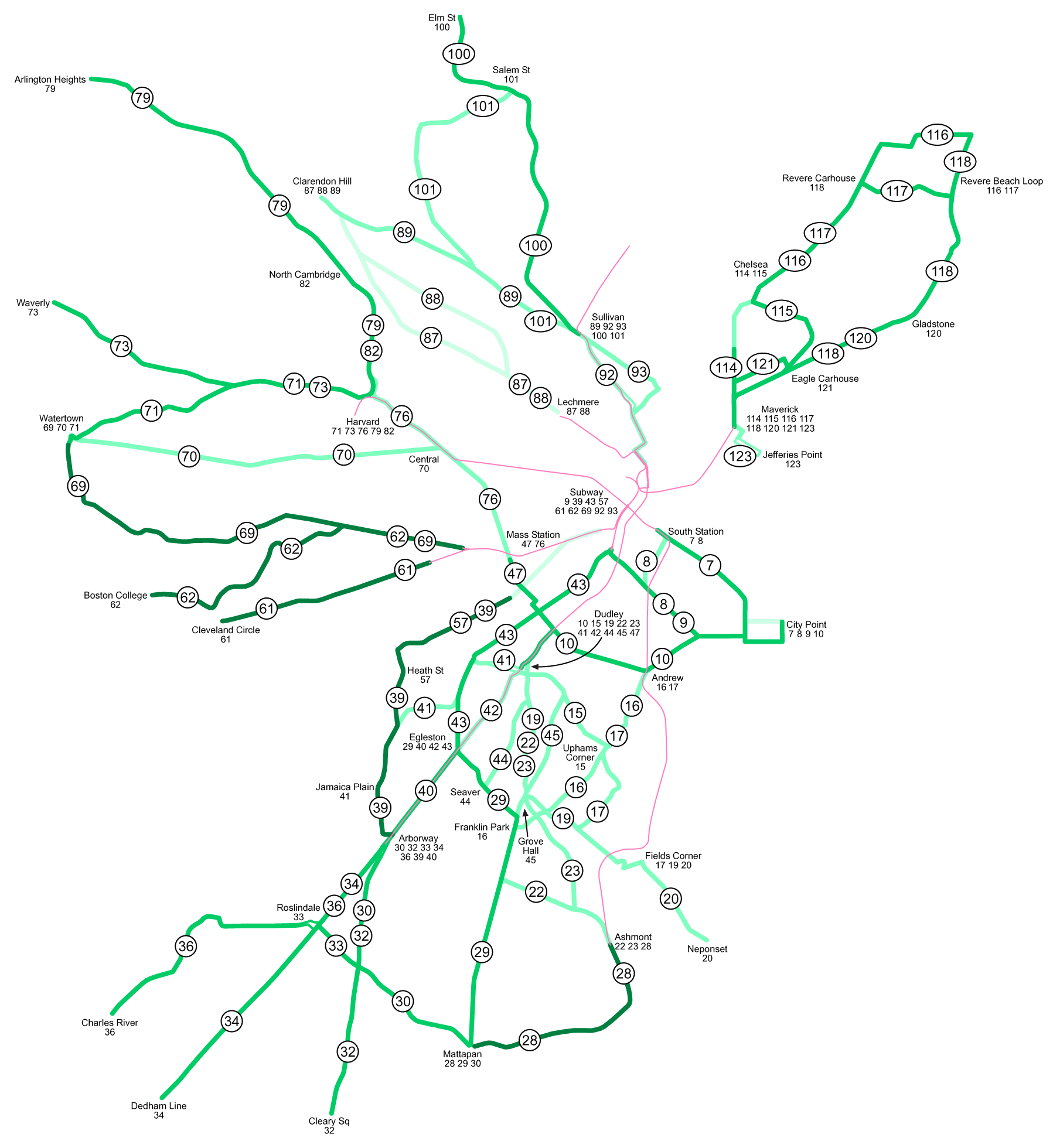
Boston Elevated Railway streetcar lines in 1940. Lighter lines were abandoned earlier; the darkest ones still existed in 1969.

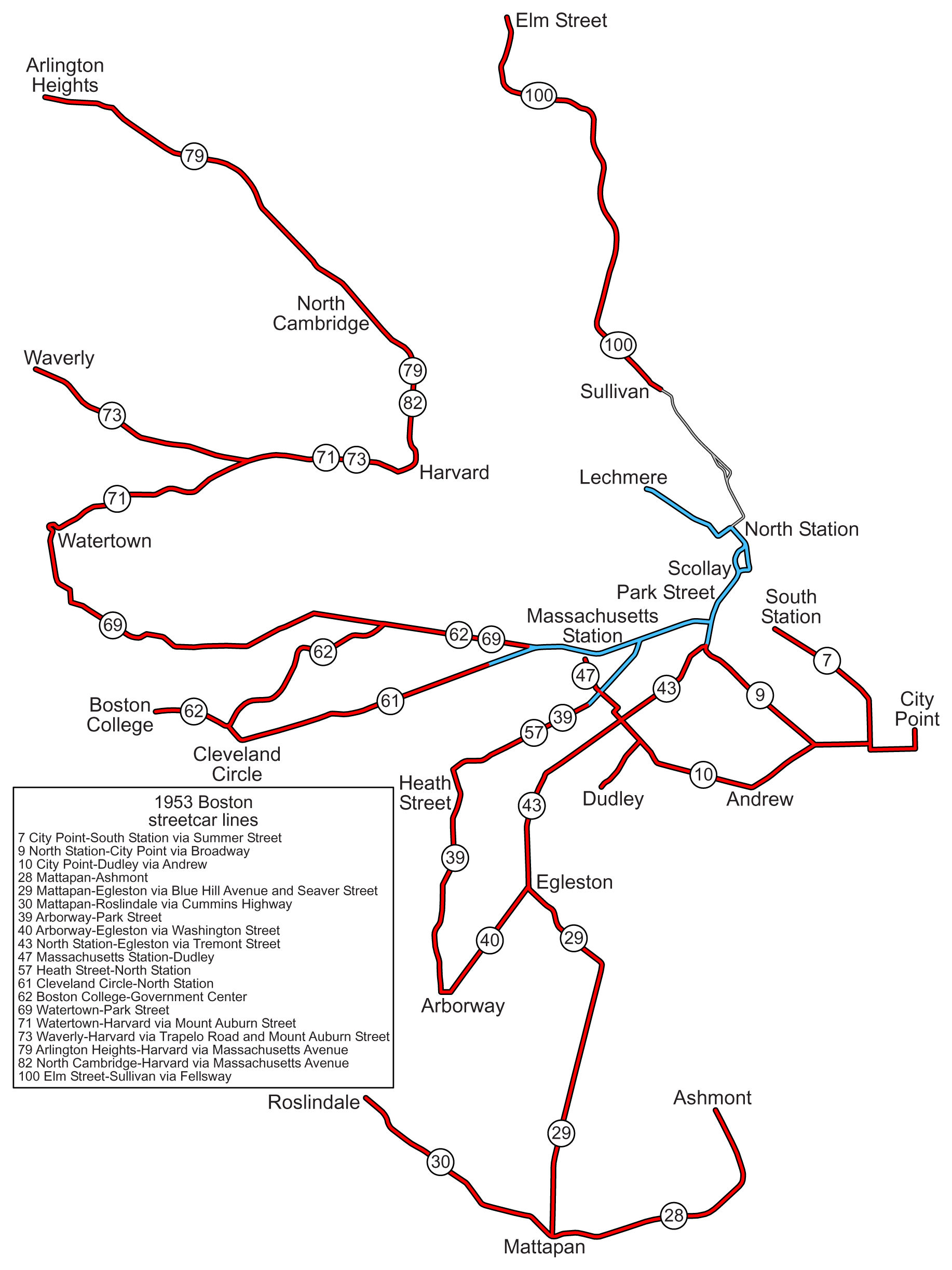
Streetcar lines remaining in Boston in 1953.

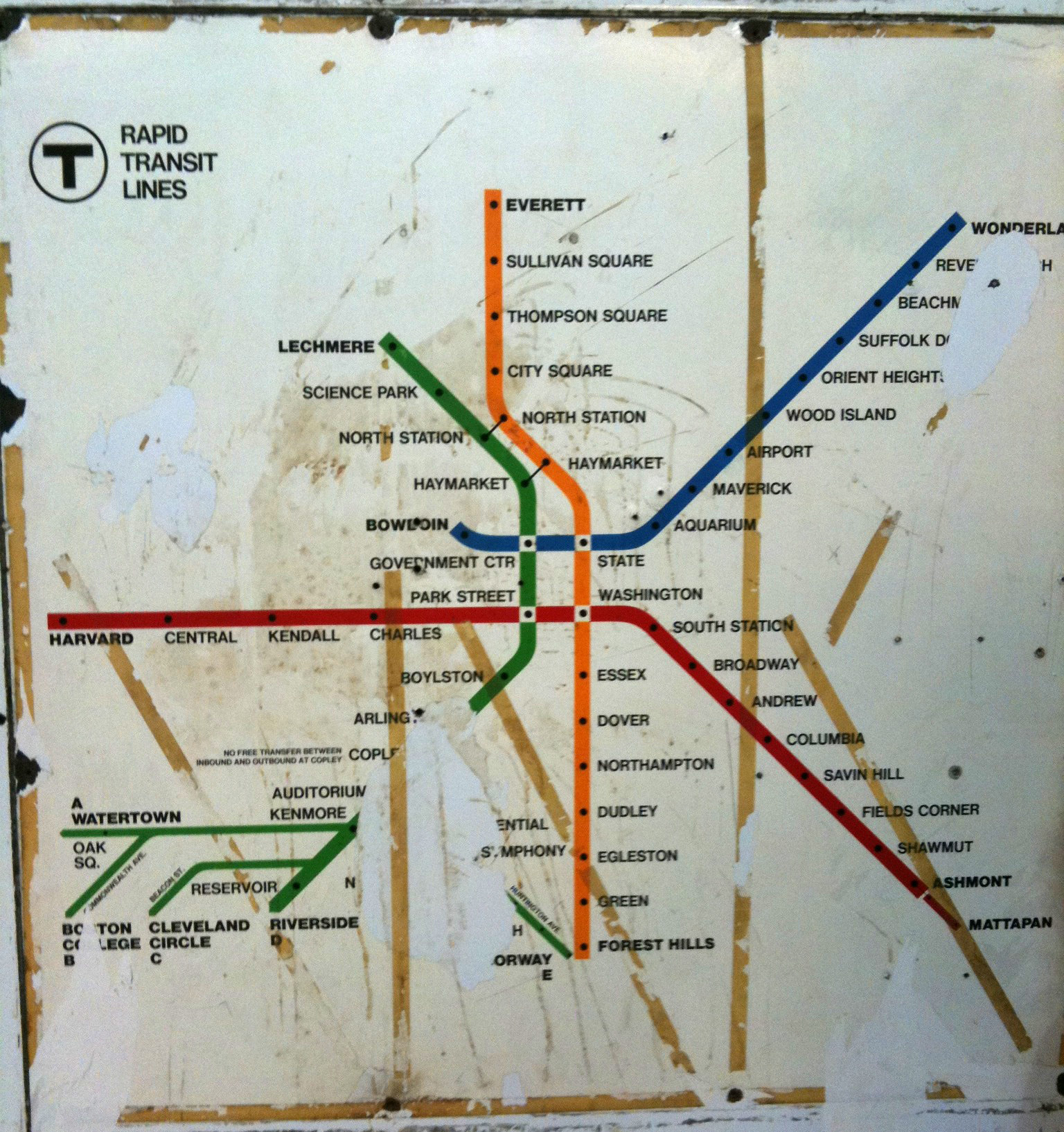
Subway map from 1967 — 1969

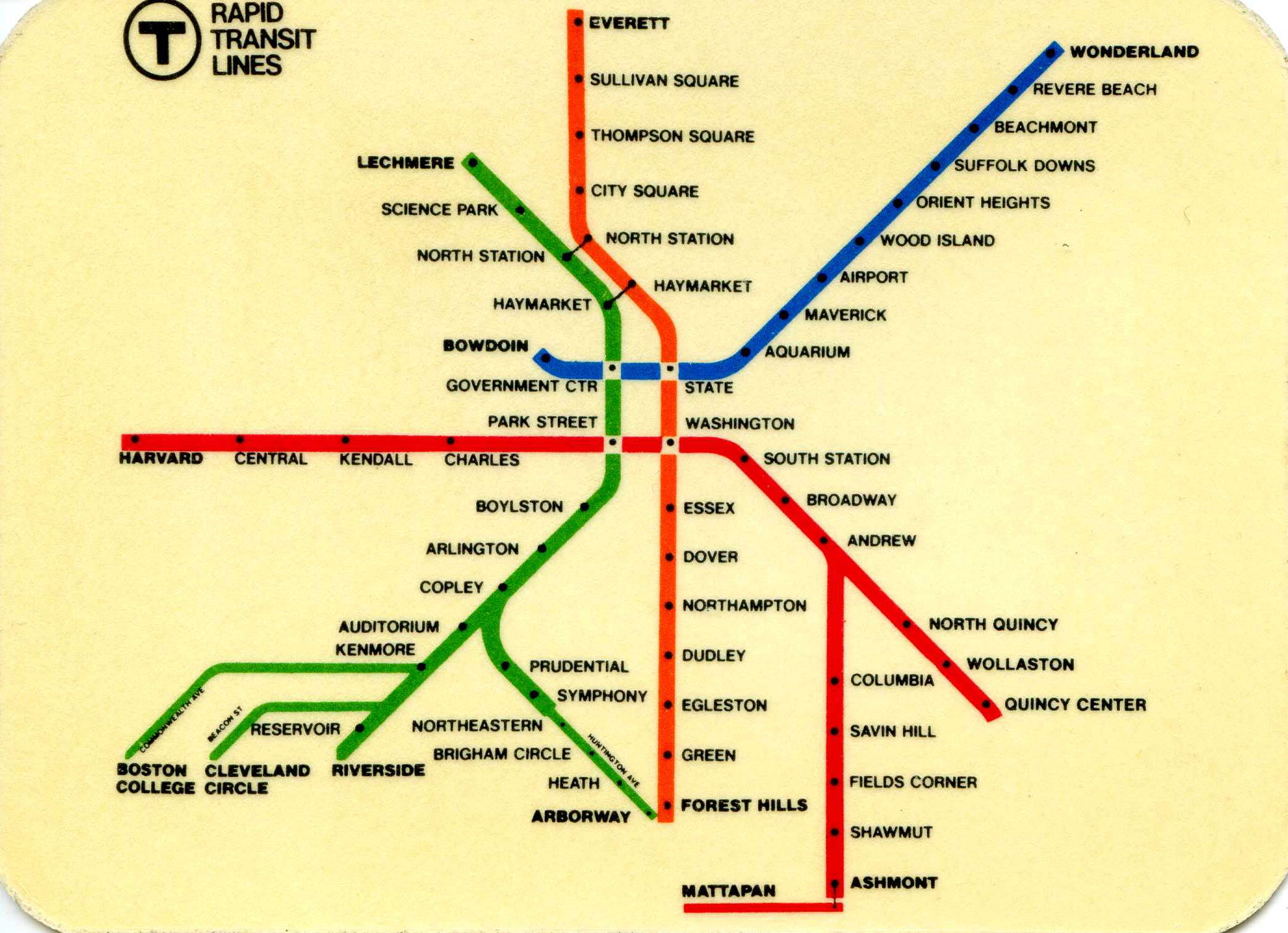
Subway map from 1973

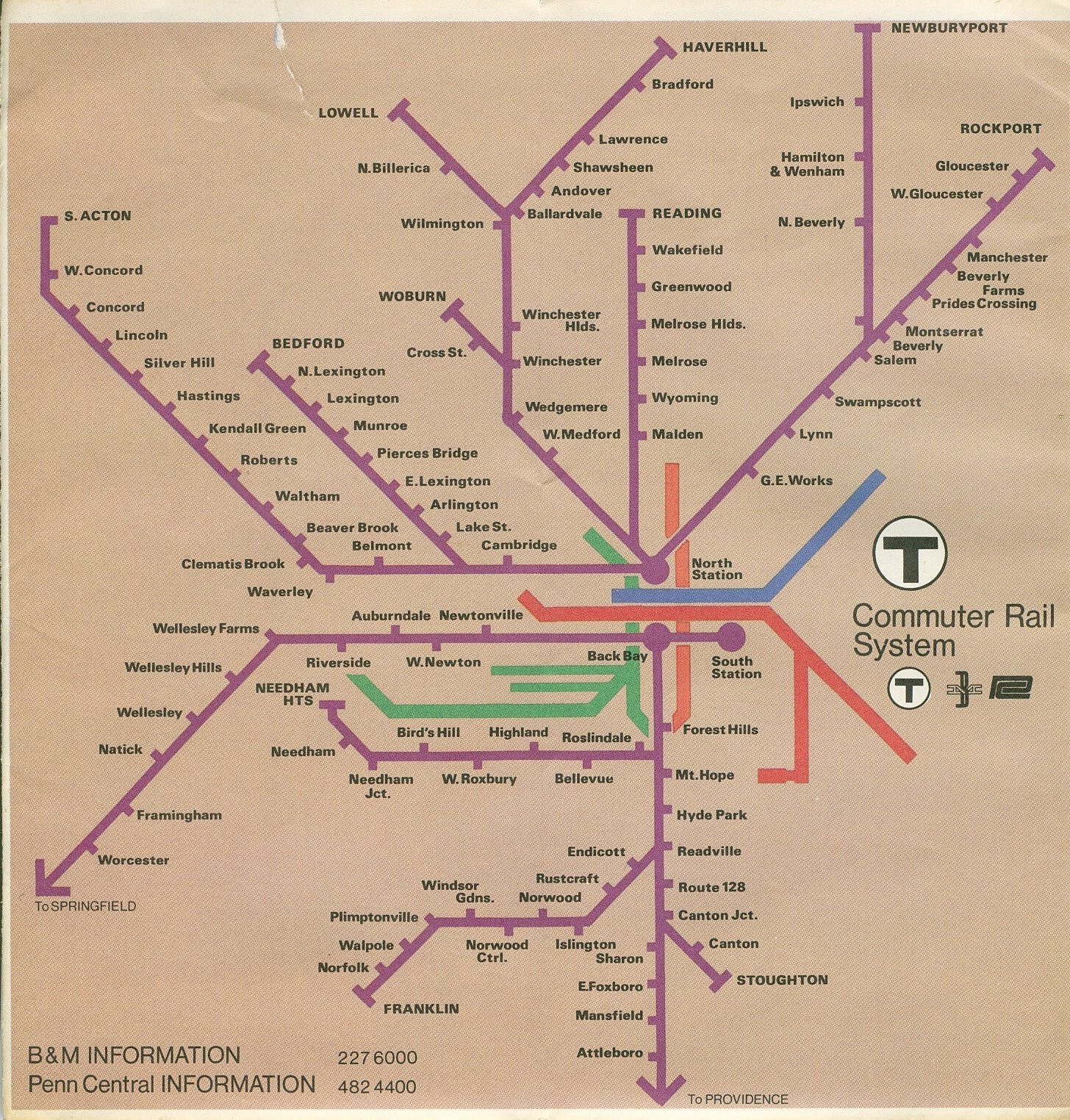
MBTA Commuter Rail service in 1975.

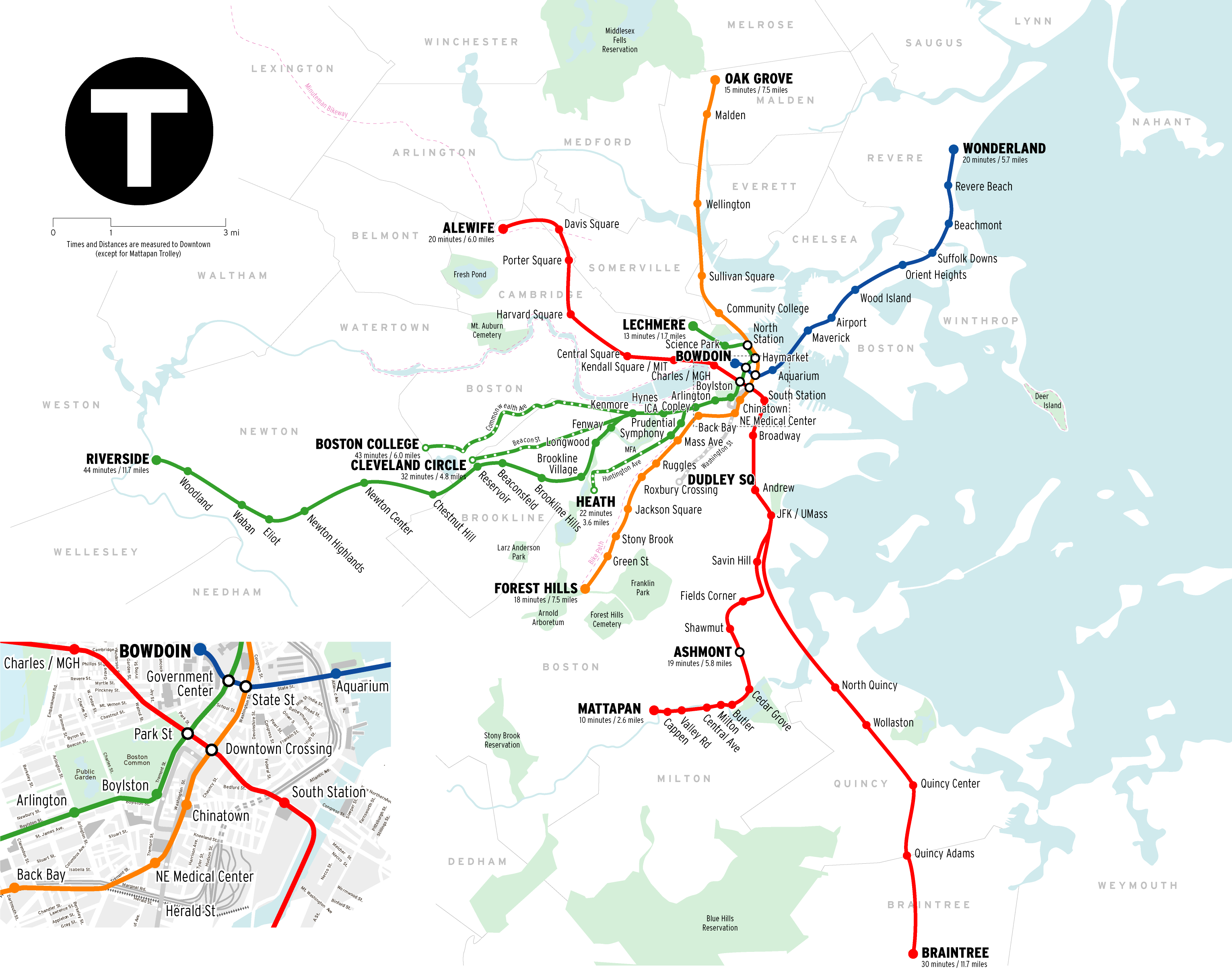
Geographically accurate MBTA map (2011)

== See also ==
- Atlantic Avenue Elevated
- Boston Elevated Railway
- Boston Street Railway Association
- Causeway Street Elevated
- Charlestown Elevated
- Green Line (MBTA)
- Lechmere Viaduct
- MBTA kickback schemes
- Trolleybuses in Greater Boston
- Washington Street Elevated
