= Riders =

Riders can refer to

== Arts, entertainment, and media ==
- Riders (novel), a book by Jilly Cooper
  - Riders (1993 film), a British film based on the book
- The Riders (film), an upcoming American drama film by Edward Berger
- Steal (film), a 2002 American action film also called Riders
- "Riders", a 2002 song by Blue from the album One Love (Blue album)
- Sonic Riders, a 2006 racing video game from the Sonic the Hedgehog series
- The Riders, collective refers to three of the Four Horsemen of the Apocalypse in NetHack, serving as the game's final bosses

== Sports ==
- Saskatchewan Roughriders (the 'Riders), a Canadian football team from Regina, Saskatchewan, Canada
- Ottawa Rough Riders (the 'Riders), a defunct Canadian football team from Ottawa, Ontario, Canada
- Leicester Riders, a British basketball team from Leicester, Leicestershire, England, UK
- Frisco RoughRiders, an American Minor League Baseball team from Frisco, Texas, USA

== Other uses ==
- "Riders", a group of police officers involved in misconduct in Oakland, California; see Allen v. City of Oakland

== See also ==
- Ride (disambiguation)
- Rider (disambiguation)
- Ryder (disambiguation)
- The Ride (disambiguation)
- The Rider (disambiguation)
