= 2000–01 Football Conference =

Football Conference
- Season: 2000–01
- Champions: Rushden & Diamonds (1st Football Conference title)
- Direct promotion: Rushden & Diamonds
- Conference League Cup winners: Chester City
- FA Trophy winners: Canvey Island (Isthmian League) (1st FA Trophy title)
- Relegated to Level 6: Hednesford, Kettering Town, Kingstonian
- Matches: 462
- Goals: 1,256 (2.72 per match)
- Top goalscorer: Duane Darby (Rushden & Diamonds), 24
- Biggest home win: Hednesford – Northwich Victoria 7–1 (2 September 2000)
- Biggest away win: Kingstonian – Morecambe 1–6 (10 March 2000)
- Highest scoring: Leigh RMI – Nuneaton 6–2 (3 March 2001); Boston – Hereford 5–3 (5 May 2001); Stevenage – Telford United 5–3 (30 September 2000); Forest Green Rovers – Dagenham & Redbridge 4–4 (16 September 2000); Morecambe – Scarborough 4–4 (16 December 2000); Woking– Dagenham & Redbridge 4–4 (14 April 2001)
- Longest winning run: ?
- Longest unbeaten run: ?
- Longest losing run: ?
- Highest attendance: Yeovil Town v Rushden & Diamonds, 8,868 (21 April 2001)
- Lowest attendance: ?
- Average attendance: 1,553 (– 4% compared to the previous season)

The Football Conference season of 2000–01 was the twenty-second season of the Football Conference, also known as the Nationwide Conference for sponsorship reasons.

== Changes since the previous season ==
- Boston United (promoted 1999–2000)
- Chester City (relegated from the Football League 1999–2000)
- Dagenham & Redbridge (promoted 1999–2000)
- Leigh RMI (promoted 1999–2000)

== Locations ==
Locations of the Football Conference 2000–2001 teams
Locations of the Football Conference London teams 2000–2001

== Final league table ==
Pos	Team	Pld	W	D	L	GF	GA	GD	Pts	Promotion or relegation
1	Rushden & Diamonds (C, P)	42	25	11	6	78	36	+42	86	Promotion to the Football League Third Division
2	Yeovil Town	42	24	8	10	73	50	+23	80	
3	Dagenham & Redbridge	42	23	8	11	71	54	+17	77	
4	Southport	42	20	9	13	58	46	+12	69	
5	Leigh RMI	42	19	11	12	63	57	+6	68	
6	Telford United	42	19	8	15	51	51	0	65	
7	Stevenage Borough	42	15	18	9	71	61	+10	63	
8	Chester City	42	16	14	12	49	43	+6	62	
9	Doncaster Rovers	42	15	13	14	47	43	+4	58	
10	Scarborough	42	14	16	12	56	54	+2	58	
11	Hereford United	42	14	15	13	60	46	+14	57	
12	Boston United	42	13	17	12	74	63	+11	56	
13	Nuneaton Borough	42	13	15	14	60	60	0	54	
14	Woking	42	13	15	14	52	57	−5	54	
15	Dover Athletic	42	14	11	17	54	56	−2	53	
16	Forest Green Rovers	42	11	15	16	43	54	−11	48	
17	Northwich Victoria	42	11	13	18	49	67	−18	46	
18	Hayes	42	12	10	20	44	71	−27	46	
19	Morecambe	42	11	12	19	64	66	−2	45	
20	Kettering Town (R)	42	11	10	21	46	62	−16	43	Relegation to the Southern League Premier Division
21	Kingstonian (R)	42	8	10	24	47	73	−26	34	Relegation to the Isthmian League Premier Division
22	Hednesford Town (R)	42	5	13	24	46	86	−40	28	Relegation to the Southern League Premier Division

(C) Champions; (P) Promoted; (R) Relegated

== Results ==
Home \ Away	BOS	CHE	D&R	DON	DOV	FGR	HAY	HED	HER	KET	KIN	LEI	MOR	NOR	NUN	R&D	SCA	SOU	STB	TEL	WOK	YEO
Boston United		0–0	5–1	3–1	1–2	0–0	0–1	3–4	5–3	4–3	2–1	0–1	2–1	1–1	4–1	1–1	2–2	1–0	3–3	2–1	0–0	4–1
Chester City	2–2		1–1	3–0	1–0	0–1	0–0	0–1	2–1	2–1	0–0	1–1	1–0	1–1	4–0	1–2	3–2	0–1	1–1	1–0	3–3	2–1
Dagenham & Redbridge	2–1	1–1		2–1	1–1	3–1	2–0	6–1	2–1	5–1	1–2	2–1	3–2	1–0	1–1	0–2	1–0	0–1	3–0	0–0	1–2	2–0
Doncaster Rovers	4–2	1–0	1–0		1–1	3–0	0–0	3–1	2–1	0–0	0–2	4–0	1–0	0–2	1–1	3–2	0–2	1–0	0–0	1–2	0–1	2–0
Dover Athletic	0–0	1–1	3–1	1–1		1–2	4–1	4–0	1–0	1–0	1–3	1–2	2–2	3–0	2–1	4–1	0–2	0–1	1–0	1–3	0–0	1–1
Forest Green Rovers	0–3	1–1	4–4	2–2	2–1		1–2	0–2	1–1	3–2	3–1	3–1	0–0	1–0	0–0	0–0	2–3	2–0	2–3	1–1	0–0	0–1
Hayes	1–1	1–3	4–1	0–3	3–2	1–0		1–1	0–2	2–1	1–1	1–2	1–1	2–2	0–0	0–3	0–1	1–0	0–1	0–1	1–2	2–3
Hednesford Town	2–4	0–0	0–2	2–4	0–0	1–1	1–3		0–3	1–2	3–2	1–2	0–0	7–1	0–3	2–3	0–1	0–1	1–1	1–1	1–2	1–2
Hereford United	1–1	2–0	0–1	0–1	4–2	3–1	3–2	1–1		0–0	0–0	1–1	2–2	0–0	1–1	3–1	1–1	0–0	1–1	2–0	0–1	2–2
Kettering Town	2–2	4–0	0–0	0–0	0–2	1–3	0–2	2–0	0–2		3–1	0–1	1–5	2–3	1–2	0–2	1–1	1–1	1–2	0–1	2–0	2–1
Kingstonian	0–0	1–3	2–3	1–1	0–0	0–1	0–1	1–0	0–3	0–1		0–2	1–6	1–0	2–2	2–4	2–2	3–1	0–2	0–1	0–3	3–4
Leigh RMI	2–2	0–1	1–2	0–1	2–1	1–1	4–0	2–2	2–1	1–0	2–1		1–0	3–0	6–2	1–0	2–0	2–2	1–4	1–1	2–0	2–3
Morecambe	2–0	0–2	2–3	2–1	1–2	0–2	4–0	0–0	1–1	0–2	3–2	1–2		4–0	4–2	2–1	4–4	1–3	1–2	0–0	3–0	0–0
Northwich Victoria	0–3	1–1	3–0	1–1	2–0	0–0	3–4	2–2	1–0	1–2	2–1	1–1	1–0		2–2	0–0	3–0	0–2	3–2	0–1	4–0	1–2
Nuneaton Borough	3–1	1–2	2–0	1–0	1–2	2–0	1–1	5–1	1–2	1–1	2–1	2–1	5–1	3–1		1–1	1–2	1–2	0–3	1–1	1–1	0–2
Rushden & Diamonds	0–0	2–0	2–1	0–0	2–1	0–0	4–0	5–1	1–0	1–1	2–1	1–1	4–1	2–1	2–1		1–0	4–0	2–2	3–0	2–0	1–2
Scarborough	2–2	0–2	0–1	3–1	2–0	1–0	2–0	0–0	2–4	0–1	1–0	1–1	2–2	4–0	0–0	0–3		1–1	2–2	1–1	3–2	2–2
Southport	3–1	1–0	0–1	1–0	2–1	1–1	2–0	2–0	1–1	2–3	2–2	1–2	1–2	1–1	1–2	1–3	3–1		2–2	3–0	0–1	3–0
Stevenage Borough	3–2	1–2	0–2	0–0	1–1	3–1	3–3	4–1	2–1	2–0	2–5	3–0	1–1	3–1	1–1	0–2	1–1	1–3		5–3	0–3	0–0
Telford United	3–2	3–0	0–1	1–0	0–2	1–0	2–0	2–1	1–0	2–1	0–1	2–1	2–0	2–3	2–1	1–2	1–0	2–3	2–2		3–1	1–2
Woking	1–1	1–0	4–4	1–1	4–1	2–0	1–2	1–1	0–3	1–1	0–0	1–1	3–1	1–1	0–2	1–4	1–1	1–2	1–1	3–0		2–3
Yeovil Town	2–1	2–1	1–3	2–0	4–0	2–0	3–0	4–2	2–3	2–0	3–1	6–1	3–2	1–0	0–0	0–0	0–1	0–1	1–1	2–0	1–0	

Updated to match(es) played on unknown. Source:
Legend: Blue = home team win; Yellow = draw; Red = away team win.

== Top scorers in order of league goals ==
Rank	Player	Club	League	FA Cup	FA Trophy	League Cup	Total
1	(England) Duane Darby	Rushden & Diamonds	24	0	3	0	27
2	(Northern Ireland) Steve Jones	Leigh RMI	19	1	0	1	21
3	(England) Warren Patmore	Yeovil Town	18	3	0	1	22
=	(England) Justin Jackson	Rushden & Diamonds	18	1	1	0	20
5	(England) Darran Hay	Stevenage Borough	15	0	1	0	16
6	(England) Rob Elmes	Hereford United	14	0	4	0	18
7	(England) Alex Meechan	Forest Green Rovers	13	0	5	0	18
=	(Saint Lucia) Ken Charlery	Boston United	13	3	1	0	17
=	(England) Marc McGregor	Nuneaton Borough	13	1	0	2	16
=	(England) Ian Arnold	Southport	13	1	1	0	15
=	(England) Dave Ridings	Leigh RMI	13	0	0	1	14
=	(England) Simon Parke	Southport	13	0	0	0	13
=	(England) Charlie Griffin	Woking	13	0	0	0	13
14	(England) Mark Beesley	Chester City	12	1	1	3	17
=	(England) Tony Black	Leigh RMI	12	3	1	1	17
=	(England) Darren Collins	Kettering Town	12	2	0	0	14
=	(England) Gary Paterson	Doncaster Rovers	12	1	0	0	13
=	(England) Joff Vansittart	Dover Athletic	12	0	0	0	12
19	(England) Neil Illman	Stevenage Borough	11	0	4	2	17
=	(England) Rocky Baptiste	Hayes	11	0	0	0	11
=	(England) Dale Watkins	Kettering Town	11	0	0	0	11
=	(Australia) Jon Brady	Rushden & Diamonds	11	0	0	0	11

- Footballtransfers.co.uk, thefootballarchives.com and Soccerbase contain information on many players
  on whom there is not yet an article in Wikipedia.
