= Rides =

Rides may refer to:

- Amusement rides
- Bridle paths, or rides, tracks through woodland for horse riders

== Music ==
- Rides (album), by British band Reef
- The Rides, an American band

== Television ==
- Rides (American TV series), an automotive reality show produced for the TLC Network
- Rides (British TV series), a drama produced by the BBC

== See also ==
- Ride (disambiguation)
