= Riding =

Riding may refer to:

- In equestrianism, riding a horse
- Riding (division), administrative division of a county, or similar district
- Electoral district (Canada), Canadian term for an electoral district
- Riding, Northumberland, a former parish, now in Broomhaugh and Riding, England
- Riding (surname)
- "Riding", a 2022 song by Bently and No Money Enterprise

== See also ==
- Common riding, event celebrated in some Scottish towns to commemorate the guarding by local men of the town's common-land boundaries
- Ridin' (disambiguation)
- Riding Mill, Northumberland
- Ridings Mill, Virginia
