= Boston Street Railway Association =

US non-profit organization

The Boston Street Railway Association (BSRA) is a non-profit organization in Boston, Massachusetts, whose central objective is preserving transportation history in Boston and throughout New England. They host monthly membership meetings, publish a bimonthly transit news magazine, and are restoring an ex-Boston Type 5 streetcar. They also regularly publish their own books and materials, as well as organize fan trips on Boston's MBTA and to the Seashore Trolley Museum in Kennebunkport, Maine. Funding for the organization is provided primarily through tax-deductible member and individual donations, as well as through grants and donations from other organizations and groups.

== History ==
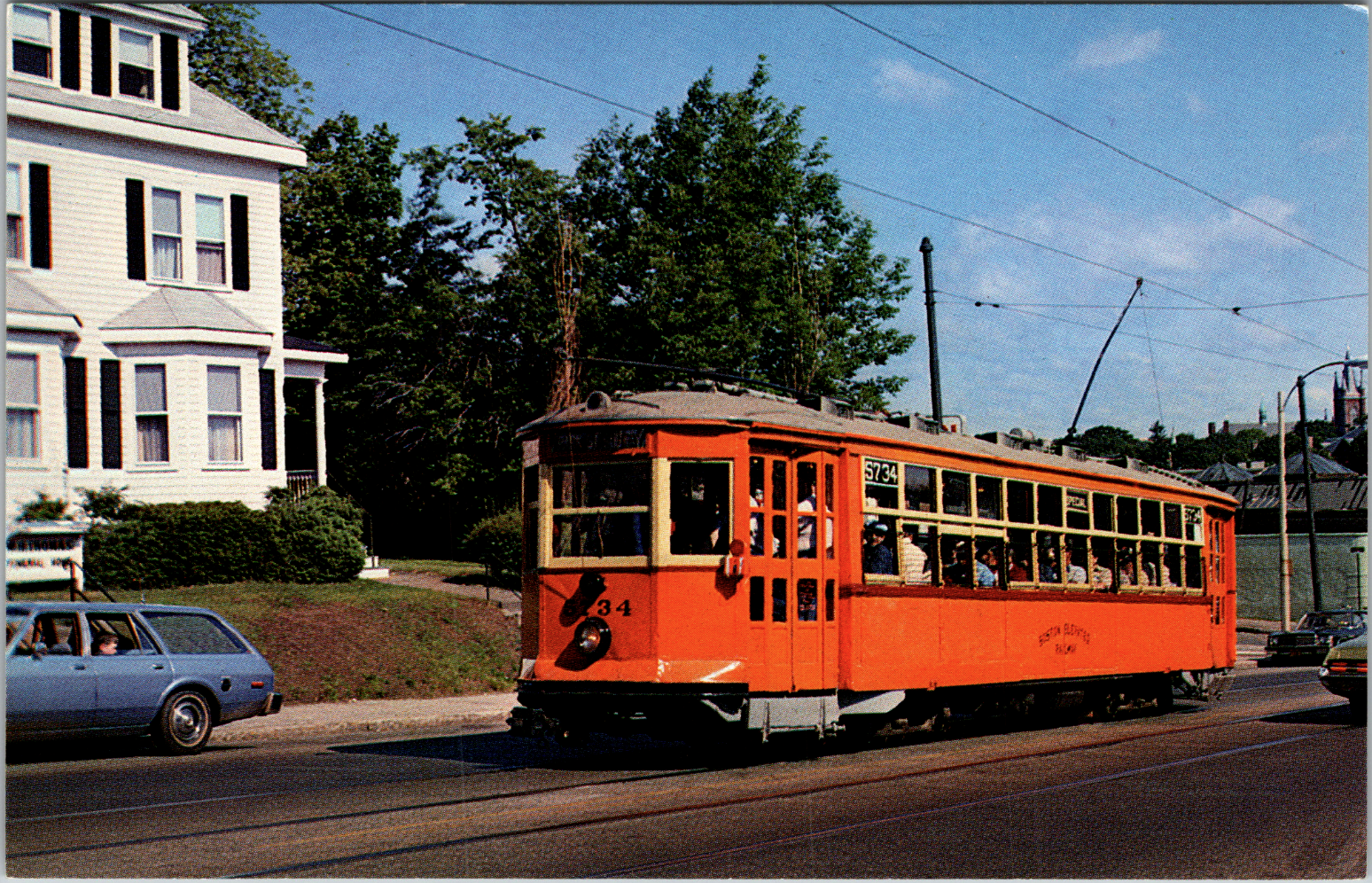
A 1981 BRSA fantrip with streetcar #5734 on the former Green Line A branch

The BSRA was founded in 1959 by ten railfans – nine in their twenties, and one teenager. That year, they purchased 1924-built Type 5 streetcar #5706 – one of only four such cars that remained – from a junkyard for $500 for future use on charter trips. The organization has since become known for its publications, which have covered various aspects of public transportation history in New England and the Boston area, its occasional fan trips on the Boston MBTA's system and other places, as well as for its bimonthly magazine, Rollsign.

== Monthly meetings ==
For many years, monthly membership meetings were held in the Grand Lodge of Massachusetts at the corner of Tremont and Boylston streets in Boston, but after that building was renovated and repurposed, BSRA gatherings have been relocated to the Midtown Hotel on Huntington Avenue. These are open to all members as well as the general public, and typically consist of a short business meeting followed by a longer entertainment presentation. Entertainment at the meetings typically consists of photo slides and videos on various topics in public transit, modern and historical, and often covers systems around the country and around the world. Any member or officer is allowed to make a presentation of their materials, provided it is scheduled in advance with the Entertainment Chairman.

== Publications ==
The BSRA publishes Roll Sign bimonthly. It is mailed to all members in good standing. It generally covers New England transportation news and events in articles and photos, submitted by publication staff and BSRA members. Recently the magazine has adopted full color printing for most of its issues, after remaining black and white for most of its existence.

The BSRA produces other publications, or "Bulletins", on a regular basis. These range in size from smaller booklets to full-size hardcover books. Topics generally include historical aspects of Boston's public transit, as well as transit in other New England cities like Providence and Newport, Rhode Island, and Fitchburg, Massachusetts. An example Bulletin, No. 24, is Boston Transit Equipment: 1979–2009, written by Michael R. Prescott and published in October 2009.

== Streetcar restoration ==
The BSRA funds and manages the restoration of a historic "Type 5" Boston streetcar, No. 5706, which was built for the Boston Elevated Railway by J.G. Brill Co. in 1924. It was acquired by the BSRA's founding members in 1959, and the BSRA has been actively preserving and restoring the car ever since.

== Fan trips ==
The BSRA charters occasional fan trips on Boston's transportation system and other railroad and transit-related locations. For example, a fan trip occurred on June 14, 2009, when the BSRA chartered a bus to visit their streetcar (#5706), and the Shore Line Trolley Museum in East Haven, Connecticut.

== Board of directors ==
BSRA Elected Board of Directors as of 2024
Bradley H. Clarke	President
Thomas Athearn	Vice President
Thaddeus S. Anderson	Secretary
Charles Bahne Jr.	Treasurer
Michael R. Prescott	Publications Director
Nicholas Tomkavage	RollSign Director & Editor
David F. Harling	Director of Car Restoration
Jonathan Belcher	Director at Large
Daniel Cohen	Director at Large
James Gately	Librarian

== See also ==
- History of the MBTA
- Seashore Trolley Museum
- Massachusetts Bay Transportation Authority
- Shore Line Trolley Museum
