= Ridin' (disambiguation) =

"Ridin'" is a 2005 song by Chamillionaire featuring Krayzie Bone.

Ridin' may also refer to:

- "Ridin'" (Mýa song), 2007
- "Ridin'" (NCT Dream song), 2020

== See also ==
- Riding (disambiguation)
