= Ryder (name) =

Ryder is both a surname and masculine given name. Notable people with the name include:

== Surname ==
- Ryder (surname)

== Given name ==
- Ryder Hesjedal (born 1980), Canadian professional racing cyclist
- Ryder Lyons, American football player
- Ryder Matos Santos (born 1993), Brazilian footballer
- Ryder Windham, American writer

== Fictional characters ==
- Honey Ryder, the Bond girl in the 1962 film Dr. No
- Charles Ryder, the protagonist of Evelyn Waugh's Brideshead Revisited
- James Ryder, in The Blue Carbuncle, a Sherlock Holmes story by Arthur Conan Doyle
- Lance "Ryder" Wilson, a fictional character in the video game Grand Theft Auto: San Andreas
- Red Ryder, a fictional cowboy character from the eponymous franchise
- Red Ryder, a character from the 1993 film Blood In, Blood Out
- Ryder, a character in the Skrull Kill Krew comics
- Ryder Callahan, a character on the CBS soap opera The Young and the Restless
- John Ryder, a character in the 1986 film The Hitcher and its 2007 remake
- Ryder, the main human character of the Canadian animated preschool TV series Paw Patrol
- Ryder, the protagonist of the Kazuo Ishiguro novel The Unconsoled
- Scott/Sara Ryder, main character of the video game Mass Effect: Andromeda
- Stephen "Red" Ryder, a character in the 1973 play When You Comin' Back, Red Ryder?
- Ryder White, a character in the video game series Dead Island
- Mr. Ryder, the biracial main character of Charles W. Chesnutt's short story "The Wife of His Youth"
- Wendell Ryder, the titular character in the Djuna Barnes novel Ryder

== See also ==
- Ryder (disambiguation)
