= Red Ryder (disambiguation) =

Red Ryder is the title of a long-running comic strip, and the name of its main character in radio, film, and TV adaptations.

Red Ryder may also refer to:

- Red Ryder BB Gun, a BB gun named for the comic strip character
- Red Ryder (radio series), an audio drama broadcast on radio based on the comic
- Stephen "Red" Ryder, a character in When You Comin' Back, Red Ryder?, a 1973 play
- Red Ryder, a character played by Tom Towles in Blood In, Blood Out (1993).
- Red Ryder (software), a communications and terminal emulation software program for the Apple Macintosh

== See also ==
- Red Rider (disambiguation)
- Ryder (disambiguation)
- Red (disambiguation)
