= Rural Institute for Development Education =

Secular NGO

The Rural Institute for Development Education (RIDE) is a secular, non-governmental organization dedicated to empower poor and disadvantaged residents in rural Tamil Nadu, India. Founded in 1984, RIDE fights to eradicate child labour, promotes economic and social justice for women, provides essential medial and educational services and cultivates economic opportunities throughout the region.

== RIDE's Successes ==
In 1997, RIDE’s research indicated that the number of child labourers in the silk-weaving industry in the district of Kanchipuram exceeded 40,000. This included children who were bonded labourers to loom owners. RIDE undertook many activities to improve the situation of child labourers. Examples include: conducting surveys, providing information, organizing demonstrations, seminars and workshops, the support of financial alternatives and the establishment of RIDE’s Bridge School Center’s and evening schools. Working collaboratively, RIDE brought down the number of child labourers to less than 4,000 by 2007.

RIDE’s Bridge Schools have been considered successful in providing a pathway to mainstream education. 95% of students who commence at Bridge Schools complete the program and enroll in the public school system. Of these graduates, 90% still attend school after 12 months.

For women RIDE stimulates empowerment through the establishment of Self Help Groups and a micro loan program. RIDE provides training to instill self-confidence, supports activities that generate income and promotes economic self-reliance. As one of the first organizations in Tamil Nadu to facilitate Self Help Groups, RIDE now supports more than 1500 Self Help Groups in 295 villages.

For the general rural population RIDE conducts training in vocational skills and income generation through its Rural Entrepreneur Development programs. 80% of new enterprises established after the training are still operating after 12 months.

RIDE increasingly focuses on improving water supply and sanitation systems in rural villages. RIDE conducts awareness programs on health care, sanitation, hygiene, HIV/AIDS, road safety and voters rights. As the need arises RIDE participates in other community campaigns, such as disaster relief after the tsunami. Early 2004 RIDE sourced and distributed over 7 million Indian rupees worth of medicine and supplies to the affected areas in its region.
