= Ride =

Ride may refer to:

== People ==
- MC Ride, a member of Death Grips
- Sally Ride (1951–2012), American astronaut
- William Ride (1926–2011), Australian zoologist

== Arts, entertainment, and media ==
=== Films ===
- Ride (1998 film), a comedy film by Millicent Shelton
- Ride (2014), a short film by Stephen Sinclair
- Ride (2009 film), a Telugu film
- Ride (2012 film), an American short music film written by Lana Del Rey and directed by Anthony Mandler
- Ride (2014 film), an American drama film starring Helen Hunt
- Ride (2018 film), a film starring American actress Bella Thorne
- Ride (2024 film), a film starring C. Thomas Howell

=== Games ===
- Ride (video game), 2015 video game
- Tony Hawk: Ride, a video game

=== Music ===
==== Albums ====
- Ride (Billy Crawford album)
- Ride (EP), by Ride
- Ride (Shelly Fairchild album)
- Ride (Jo Hikk album)
- Ride (Boney James album)
- Ride (Loreen album)
- Ride (Oysterband album)
- Ride (Jamie Walters album)
- R.I.D.E. (pronounced "Ride"), album by Trick Pony
- Ride, by NaNa

==== Songs ====
- "Ride" (Ace Hood song), 2008
- "Ride" (Baker Boy song), featuring Yirrmal, 2021
- "Ride" (Cary Brothers song), 2008
- "Ride" (Ciara song), 2010
- "Ride" (Lana Del Rey song), 2012
- "Ride" (Lenny Kravitz song), 2018
- "Ride" (Martina McBride song), 2008
- "Ride" (SoMo song), 2013
- "Ride" (Twenty One Pilots song), 2015
- "Ride" (the Vines song), 2004
- "Ride" (ZZ Ward song), featuring Gary Clark Jr., 2017
- "Ride!", by Dee Dee Sharp, 1963
- "Ride", a contemporary concert band piece composed by Samuel Hazo
- "Ride", an instrumental from Bond's album Shine
- "Ride", by Beautiful Creatures, from the album Beautiful Creatures
- "Ride", by Caravan, from the album Caravan
- "Ride", by Cathedral, from the album The Ethereal Mirror
- "Ride", by Chance the Rapper, from the album Star Line
- "Ride", by Chase Rice, from the album Ignite the Night
- "Ride", by Shea Couleé from the album Couleé-D
- "Ride", by The Dandy Warhols, from the album Dandys Rule OK
- "Ride", by Deepsky, from the album In Silico
- "Ride", by Empire of the Sun, from the album Two Vines
- "Ride", by Jessie Ware, from the album Superbloom
- "Ride", by Joe Satriani, from the album Flying in a Blue Dream
- "Ride", by Liz Phair, from the album whitechocolatespaceegg
- "Ride", by Max Ehrich, written for the film Walk. Ride. Rodeo.
- "Ride", by Rob Zombie, from the album Educated Horses
- "Ride", by Robyn Hitchcock, from the album Perspex Island
- "Ride", by Royce da 5'9", from the album Independent's Day
- "Ride", by Sir Mix-a-Lot, from the album Chief Boot Knocka
- "Ride", by Testament, from the album Low
- "Ride", by Trace Adkins, from the album Dangerous Man
- "Ride", by Tyr, from the album By the Light of the Northern Star
- "Ride", by Usher, from the album Confessions

==== Other uses in music ====
- Ride (band), English rock band
- Ride, musical improvisation, common in early jazz
- Ride cymbal, the standard cymbal in most drum kits

=== Other uses in arts, entertainment, and media ===
- Ride (2016 TV series), a Canadian drama TV series on YTV and Nickelodeon
- Ride (2023 TV series), a Canadian/American coproduced neo-Western drama on Hallmark Channel and CTV Drama Channel
- Ride, a 2002 novel by David Walton
- RIDE: A Review Journal for Digital Editions and Resources, a peer-reviewed academic journal published by the Institut für Dokumentologie und Editorik

== Other uses ==
- Amusement ride
- Bridle path, or ride, a track through woodland for horse riders
- Reduce Impaired Driving Everywhere, a sobriety-testing program used by Canadian police
- Rhode Island Department of Education
- Ride quality, how well a vehicle copes with uneven surfaces
- Road Improvement and Development Effort, a highway program in South Carolina
- Rural Institute for Development Education, an NGO based in Tamil Nadu, India
- RIDE, a brand of Chinese automobile maker BYD Auto

== See also ==
- Midnight Ride (disambiguation)
- Rider (disambiguation)
- Rides (disambiguation)
- Riding (disambiguation)
- The Ride (disambiguation)
