= The Ride (Small Town Titans album) =

Studio album by Small Town Titans
- Released: November 13, 2020
- Recorded: 2020
- Genres: Hard rock, Post-grunge, Heavy metal
- Length: 46:41
- Label: AntiFragile Music
- Producers: Grant McFarland, Carson Slovak, Kevin Soffera, Mike Plotnikoff, Howard Benson, Ted Jensen

Small Town Titans chronology
What Comes Next (2019)	The Ride (2020)

The Ride is an album by American hard rock power trio Small Town Titans, released in November 2020. The album features nine original songs, as well as a cover of Marcy Playground's "Sex and Candy".

== Reception ==
Mike O'Cull of Rock and Blues Muse regards the album as "one of the best rock releases of our current era and shows us all just how much life is left in the primordial power trio format." Gerrod Harris of The Spill Magazine praised the album highly, saying that with the album the band "have set the tone for the shape of hard rock throughout the coming decade."

== Track listing ==
All tracks are written by Phillip Nathaniel Freeman, Jonathan Ross O'Neill, Benjamin Tyler Guiles except where noted

The Ride track listing
No.	Title	Writer(s)	Length
1.	"Rufflin' Feathers"		3:09
2.	"Behind the Moon"		4:00
3.	"The Man"		4:28
4.	"Let Me Breathe"		5:17
5.	"Universal Limits"	Freeman, O'Neill, Guiles, John Moyer, George Edward Roberts	3:16
6.	"9 to 5"	Freeman, O'Neill, Guiles, Roberts	4:37
7.	"Sex and Candy"	John Wozniak	5:47
8.	"When It All Comes Down"		4:18
9.	"Junkie For You (Hey Mama)"	Freeman, O'Neill, Guiles, Howard Benson	3:34
10.	"The Ride"		8:09

== Personnel ==
- Phillip Freeman – vocals, bass guitar
- Mitch Hood – guitar, backing vocals
- Jonny Ross – drums, backing vocals

== Production ==
- Production: Grant McFarland and Carson Slovak (1–8, 10), Kevin Soffera, Mike Plotnikoff, Howard Benson, Ted Jensen (9)
