= Phil Ridings =

Australian cricketer

Phil Ridings AO
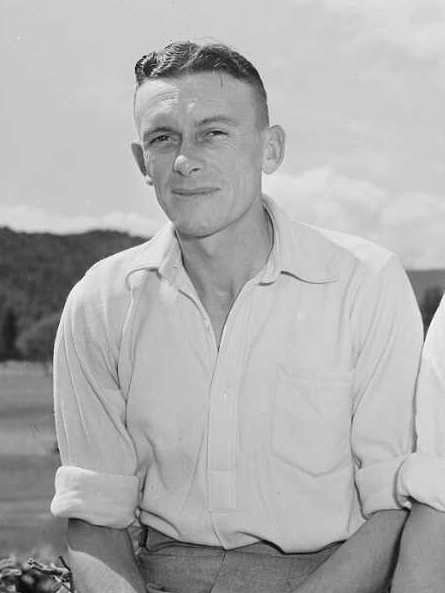
- Ridings in New Zealand in 1950
- Born: 2 October 1917; Malvern, South Australia, Australia
- Died: 13 September 1998 (aged 80); Adelaide, South Australia
- Resting place: Centennial Park Cemetery; cenotaph at Seaview Road, West Beach
- Cricket career

Personal information
- Full name: Philip Lovett Ridings
- Batting: Right-handed
- Bowling: Right-arm medium-fast
- Relatives: Ken Ridings (brother)

Domestic team information
- Years: Team
- 1937–38 to 1956–57: South Australia

Career statistics
Competition	First-class
Matches	102
Runs scored	5653
Batting average	36.23
100s/50s	9/29
Top score	186 not out
Balls bowled	6070
Wickets	61
Bowling average	46.95
5 wickets in innings	0
10 wickets in match	0
Best bowling	4/66
Catches/stumpings	55/0
- Source: CricketArchive, 31 December 2016

Philip Lovett Ridings AO (2 October 1917 – 13 September 1998) was an Australian cricketer. He attended Unley High School from 1930 to 1934.

Nicknamed "Pancho", Ridings played first-class cricket for South Australia from 1937 to 1957, scoring nine hundreds. Primarily a batsman, he also took 61 first-class wickets with his fast-medium pace bowling. He was captain of the South Australia team that officially complained to the New South Wales Cricket Association over the Sid Barnes twelfth man incident.

After his playing days, Ridings was a cricket administrator and Chairman of the Australian Cricket Board from 1980 to 1983.

Ridings was appointed Officer of the Order of Australia in 1982.
