= Two Ridings Community Foundation =

Charity in York, England

The Two Ridings Community Foundation (TRCF) is an English charity and community foundation which by July 2026, has made grants totaling over £25 million to more than 1,700 local projects in York, North Yorkshire, the East Riding of Yorkshire and Hull, and raised more than £2 million which is invested in a long term endowment fund.

Two Ridings is one of 54 Community Foundations in the UK.

== Mission ==
It aims to increase private philanthropy and build on its permanent endowment fund to make grants to charities and community groups in the area.

== History ==
The Two Ridings Community Foundation was established in October 2000 as the York and North Yorkshire Community Foundation (YNYCF). In 2010 the Foundation changed its name to the Two Ridings Community Foundation when it extended its area of work to include the East Ridings of Yorkshire and Hull.

== Grant making ==
Funds are raised from private donations, businesses, philanthropists, trusts and statutory bodies. Funds are distributed to local charities and community projects in York, North Yorkshire, the East Riding of Yorkshire and Hull, supporting projects to benefit:

- Children and young people
- People with special needs and other disabilities
- Older people
- Disadvantaged people
- Artistic and cultural life
