= Rider =

Rider or Riders may refer to:

== People and characters ==
- Horserider (equestrianism)
- Snowboarder also called rider

=== Persons ===
- Rider (surname)
- H. Rider Haggard (1856-1925), British novelist
- Rider Strong (born 1979), American actor, director, producer and screenwriter

=== Fictional characters ===
- Rider (Fate/Stay Night), a character in the Japanese series Fate/Stay Night
- Rider (Fate/Zero), a character in the Japanese novel Fate/Zero
- Honeychile Rider, a character in the James Bond novel Dr. No
- Alex Rider (character), hero of a series of spy novels by Anthony Horowitz

== Aircraft ==
Racing aircraft designed by Keith Rider

- Rider R-5 and Rider R-4 built to compete in the 1936 racing season
- Rider R-6, the last design due to World War II which stopped the National Air Races

== Film and TV ==
- Steal (film), a 2002 action film also known as Riders
- The Rider (film), a 2017 American film
- Kamen Rider, a long running tokusatsu franchise
- Rider (2021 film), an Indian Kannada-language romantic-action film
- Rider (2023 film), a Sri Lankan film

== Law ==
- Rider (legislation), an additional provision attached to a bill
- Rider (contract), an additional provision attached to a contract such as an insurance policy
- Rider (legal judgement), an explanation appended to a legal decision by a jury or inquest
- Rider (theater), a set of requests or demands that a performer will set as criteria for performance

== Literature ==
- Rider, the magazine published by the British Motorcyclists Federation
- Riders (novel), a romance novel by the British author Jilly Cooper
- Rider (imprint), a publishing imprint of Random House

== Music ==
- Rider (band), an offshoot band from Ultra
- Haydn's String Quartet Op. 74, No. 3, nicknamed "The Rider"; see List of string quartets by Joseph Haydn#Opus 71, 74, the "Apponyi" quartets (1793)

=== Songs ===
- "Rider", a 1963 song by The Big Three
- "Rider", a 1966 song by Jesse Colin Young & The Youngbloods
- "Rider", a 2011 song by Kara from Step
- "Rider", a 2011 song by Okkervil River
- "Rider", a 2018 song by Thirty Seconds to Mars from America
- "Rider", a 2019 song by Teairra Mari

== Other uses ==
- Rider University, an American university in New Jersey
  - Rider Broncs, said university's athletic program
- JetBrains Rider, an integrated development environment application software

== See also ==
- Ride (disambiguation)
- Riders (disambiguation)
- Ryder (disambiguation)
- The Ride (disambiguation)
- The Rider (disambiguation)
