= Ken Ridings =

Australian cricketer (1920–1943)

Personal information
- Full name: Kenneth Lovett Ridings
- Born: 7 February 1920; Malvern, South Australia, Australia
- Died: 17 May 1943 (aged 23); North Atlantic Ocean
- Batting: Right-handed
- Bowling: Right-arm leg-spin
- Relatives: Phil Ridings (brother)

Domestic team information
- Years: Team
- 1938-39 to 1940–41: South Australia

Career statistics
| Competition | First-class |
|---|---|
| Matches | 19 |
| Runs scored | 919 |
| Batting average | 32.82 |
| 100s/50s | 2/4 |
| Top score | 151 |
| Balls bowled | 320 |
| Wickets | 7 |
| Bowling average | 26.00 |
| 5 wickets in innings | 0 |
| 10 wickets in match | 0 |
| Best bowling | 4/26 |
| Catches/stumpings | 6/0 |
- Source: CricketArchive, 31 December 2016

Kenneth Lovett Ridings (7 February 1920 – 17 May 1943) was an Australian cricketer and air force pilot who died in World War II.

== Cricket career ==
An opening batsman and occasional leg-spin bowler, Ken Ridings made his first-class debut for South Australia in December 1938 at the age of 18. He played all six of South Australia's matches in that season's Sheffield Shield, which South Australia won. In the match against Queensland in Brisbane he scored 122 in the first innings, adding 197 for the first wicket with Richard Whitington and 109 for the second wicket with his captain, Don Bradman, and took 2 for 27 and 4 for 26. The next season, against Queensland in Adelaide, he scored 151, adding 196 in 115 minutes with Bradman, in South Australia's total of 7 for 821 declared.

== Military service and death ==
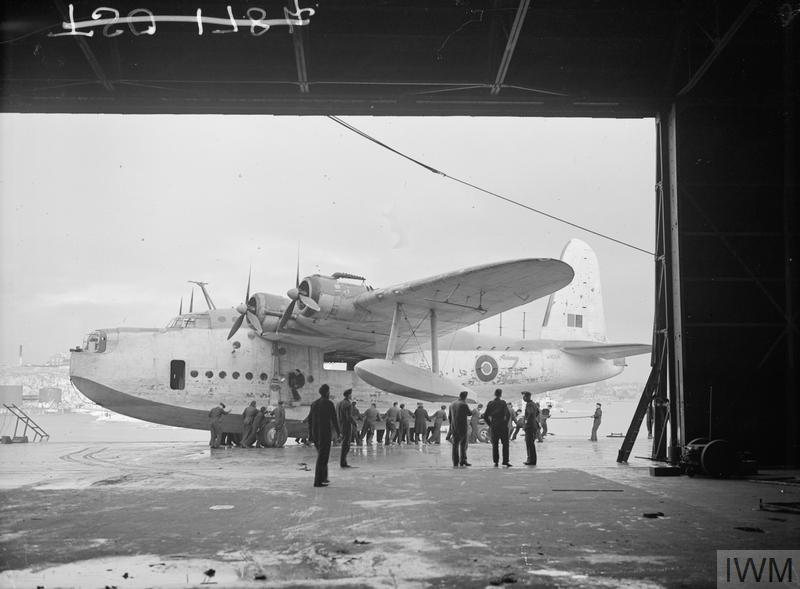
Short Sunderland DW4004, the aircraft Ridings was shot down and killed in

Ridings enlisted in the Royal Australian Air Force in July 1941 and served as a flying officer. On 17 May 1943, a Short Sunderland took off from RAF Mount Batten in Devon with 12 people on board, including Ridings, who was serving in the role of first pilot. The plane was detailed to conduct an anti-submarine sweep over the North Atlantic Ocean. During the sweep, the Sunderland was shot down by Junkers Ju 88s, killing everybody on board.
