= Ryder Report =

Ryder Report may refer to:

- Ryder Report (Detention and Corrections in Iraq), 2003 report from the inquiry by U.S. Provost Marshal Donald Ryder into reports of abuse by American troops in Iraq
- Ryder Report (British Leyland), 1975 report from the enquiry by Sir Don Ryder into the British Leyland Motor Corporation
