= The Ride (MBTA) =

Greater Boston paratransit service

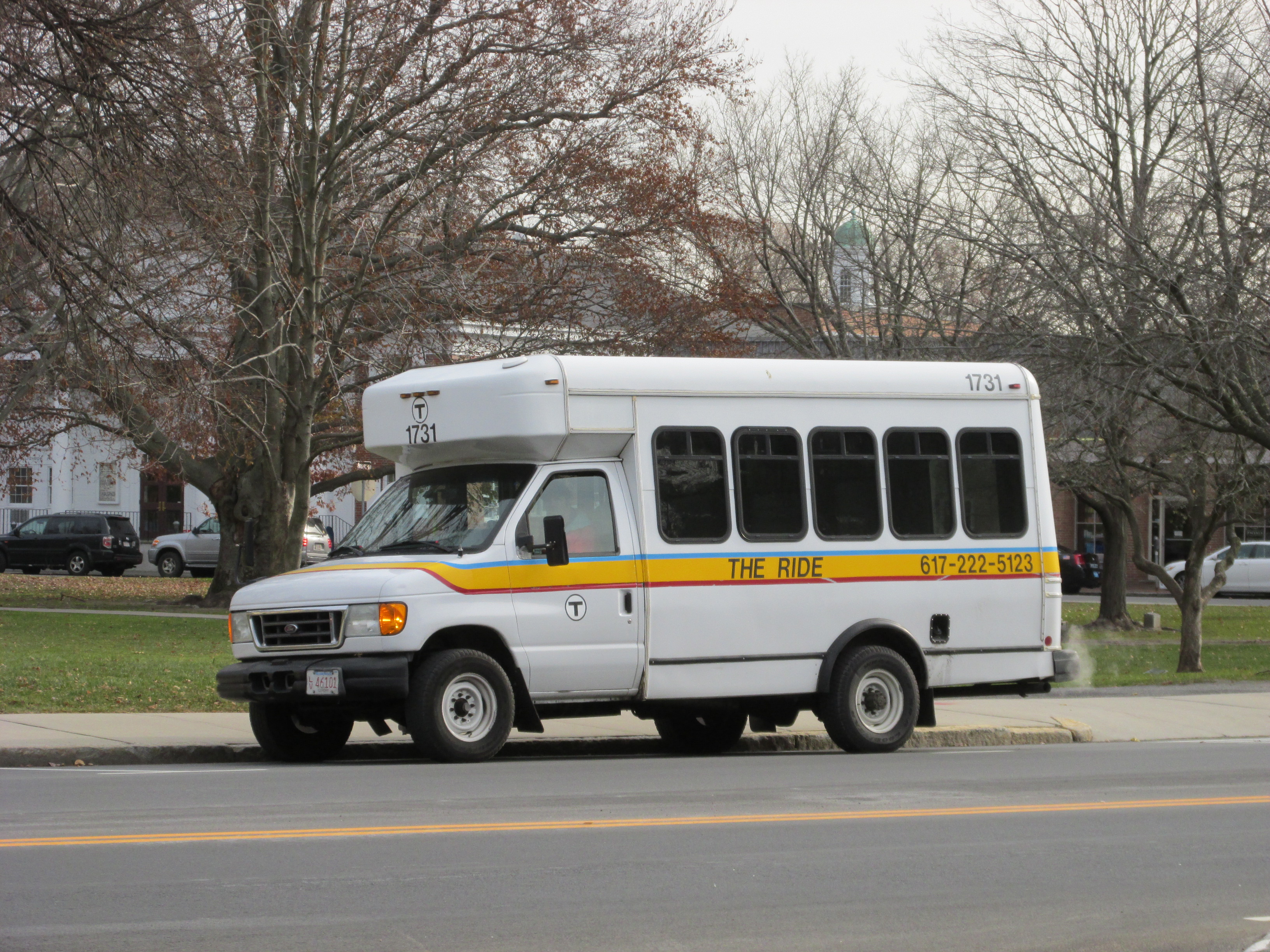
The Ride van in Lexington Center

The Ride (sometimes styled as The RIDE) is the Massachusetts Bay Transportation Authority's ADA paratransit program for people with physical, mental or cognitive disabilities that make it difficult or impossible to ride the MBTA's fixed-route bus, subway, and trolley system. The Ride provides door-to-door service, from vehicle to door. Using wheelchair accessible vans and four door sedans (cars), drivers (paratransit operators) assist passengers from door to vehicle, take them directly to their destinations, and assist them from vehicle to door. The Ride satisfies requirements under the 1990 Americans With Disabilities Act for transit systems to provide services for those who cannot ride the fixed-route system. The service began in April 1977 with two vehicles. In 2023, The Ride provided 1.5 million rides to 30,000 riders with a $130 million budget. Daily ridership in July 2026 was 3,879.

Unlike the MBTA's fixed-route services, The Ride trips must be scheduled in advance, typically by 5pm local time the day before. Same-day trip changes and those greater than 3/4 mile from fixed-route services and outside of the core service area are considered premium trips and incur a surcharge. The Ride does not use the MBTA's CharlieCard; instead, passengers must set up an individual account with the MBTA.

In 2016, the MBTA started a pilot program that allows passengers to use a TNC (transportation network company) such as Lyft or Uber a specified number of times per month. This is a curb to curb service rather than door to door service, and there is very limited availability of TNC vehicles with wheelchair lifts. However, there is no need to call and schedule the day before: the TNC trip is set up through a smartphone application. Under this program, for each trip the passenger pays a small fare and the MBTA pays the TNC up to a certain amount; if the total fare is above that amount, the passenger is responsible for the rest of the fare.

The Ride has attracted criticism in recent years for its high operating cost per rider per trip (over US$65 in 2016) and its inefficient service model. The vendors operating the Ride are contracted to receive over $40 per trip made minus penalties for lateness. As of July 2019, passengers pay a fare of $3.35 for an ADA regular trip and $5.60 for a non-ADA premium trip. The rest of the cost, over 90%, is covered by the MBTA. By policy or regulation, the fare for a trip on The Ride is kept close to the fare for a trip on an MBTA bus.

== Operations ==
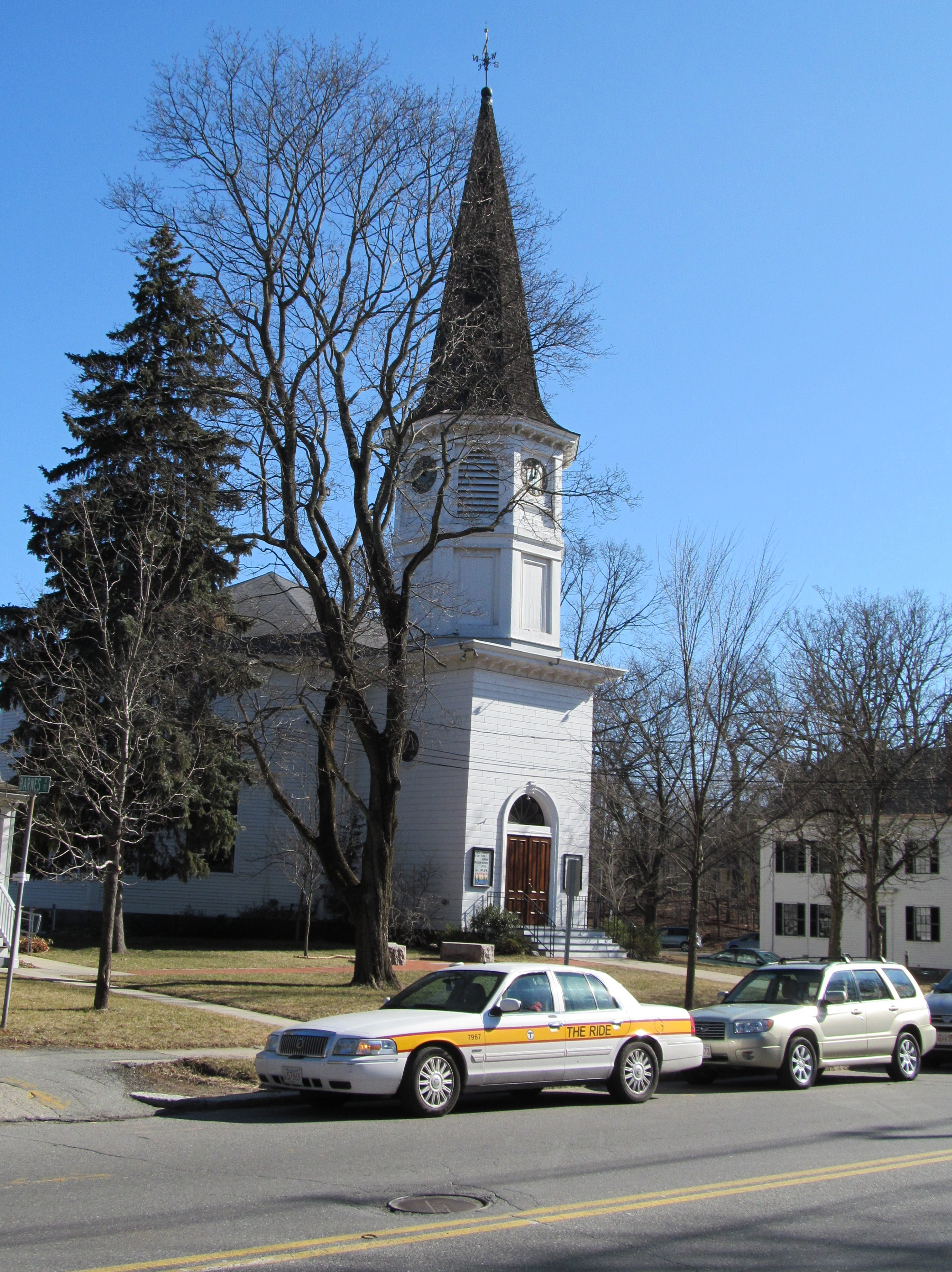
The Ride vehicle in Lexington

The Ride program is run by the MBTA, but actual service is contracted out to two companies in the Greater Boston area, namely NEXT (National Express Transit) and VTS (Veterans Transportation Services). Additionally, the MBTA contracts out call center services - including reservations, scheduling and dispatch - to a vendor (currently Intelliride, a subsidiary of Transdev). The MBTA uses vans and sedans for The Ride and uses the MBTA branding on all its Ride vehicles.

The MBTA generally awards Ride contracts to Service Providers every five years. In September 2019, the MBTA offered 50% of Ride trips to NEXT, 30% to MV Transportation and 20% to VTS for the next contract period after evaluating price points and technical abilities of each vendor. However, MV Transportation decided not to accept the contract offer, and in November 2019, the MBTA awarded 50% to VTS and 50% to NEXT. MBTA's the Ride services all areas serviced by MBTA bus routes. In March 2020, transfers between service providers were stopped temporarily during the COVID-19 pandemic of 2020 for health reasons and in June 2020, the MBTA decided to make that change permanent. Both service providers, NEXT and VTS, provide the Ride service in all of the Ride service area.

On October 1, 2021, trips from Logan International Airport terminals that terminate within 3/4 mile (1.2 km) of the MBTA subway system became free, matching existing free inbound Silver Line trips from the airport.

A new scheduling software, Routematch, was put in service in August 2020. In October 2021, the MBTA announced that Routematch would be replaced with the previous software, ADEPT, because of service issues with Routematch.

== Criticism ==
The program has been criticized for its high cost to the MBTA, particularly since much of the MBTA was made accessible in the past three decades. During discussions of potential major fare increases and service cuts in 2013, the program's high cost per rider was cited as waste.

As of November 2019, all MBTA Bus routes, Orange Line stations and Red Line stations are accessible as are all but one Blue Line station, all but one Mattapan Trolley stop, most Green Line stations, and most commuter rail stations. Many Ride customers use a combination of regular MBTA bus, train and trolley as well as the Ride paratransit service especially within the core communities of Boston, Brookline, Cambridge and Somerville. Despite this, the number of Ride users and the number of daily Ride trips continue to increase every year. The MBTA has partially addressed the issue of cost by instituting programs where certain Ride users can use lower cost TNC (technology network company) rides (e.g., Lyft, Uber) which provide curb to curb service.

== 2020 VTS strike ==
Effective June 27, 2020, VTS and NEXT began covering the catchment area previously served by GLSS. Many former GLSS drivers became VTS employees at this time.

On July 12, 2020, during the COVID-19 pandemic, the drivers at VTS voted to strike over health benefits. Teamsters Local 25 had been negotiating a new contract with VTS for several weeks before it expired at the end of June. Social distancing is very difficult in the Ride vehicles and impossible when the passengers require physical assistance, so the drivers were very concerned about protecting their health.

In April 2020, The Ride discontinued shared rides to protect passengers and drivers during the pandemic. However, once the strike began the MBTA stated “Due to a shortage of drivers, shared trips on The Ride will temporarily resume. Customers should expect to be on vehicles at the same time as other customers.”

On July 19, 2020, after being on strike for eight days, Veterans drivers approved a new contract, with 90% of the voters voting in favor of it.
