= Riding (surname) =

Riding is a surname. Notable people with the surname include:

- Douglas Riding (born 1943), Australian air marshal
- Joanna Riding (born 1967), English actress
- Laura Riding (1901–1991), American poet and writer
