= Dave Ridings =

English footballer

Personal information
- Full name: David Ridings
- Date of birth: 27 February 1970 (age 56)
- Place of birth: Farnworth, England
- Height: 6 ft 0 in (1.83 m)
- Position: Midfielder

Senior career*
Years	Team	Apps	(Gls)
1990–1993	Curzon Ashton		
1990–1991	→Macclesfield Town	1	(0)
1993–1994	Halifax Town	37	(8)
1994	Lincoln City	10	(0)
1994–1995	Ashton United		
1995–1996	Crewe Alexandra	1	(0)
1995–1996	→Hednesford Town (loan)		
1996–2002	Leigh RMI		
2002–2003	Stalybridge Celtic	9	(0)
2002–2003	Curzon Ashton		
- * Club domestic league appearances and goals

David Ridings (born 27 February 1970) is an English former professional footballer who played in the Football League for Halifax Town, Lincoln City and Crewe Alexandra.

== Playing career ==
=== Halifax Town ===
Ridings signed for Third Division club Halifax Town in January 1993, and he scored on his debut as Halifax picked up their first win in 13 games with 3–0 victory at Darlington.

=== Lincoln City ===
Fellow Third Division side Lincoln City bought Ridings for £10,000 in February 1994.

=== Leigh RMI ===
On 24 August 1996, he joined Leigh RMI just an hour before the transfer deadline, enabling him to make his debut for the club, as a substitute, in the 3–1 Northern Premier League Division One home defeat to Droylsden later that afternoon. He played over 200 games for The Railwaymen in nearly six years with the club.

=== Stalybridge Celtic ===
In April 2002, Ridings turned down the offer of a new 12-month contract with Leigh to join Stalybridge Celtic, linking up with former Leigh assistant manager David Miller and a number of ex-Hilton Park teammates. He made his debut in the 2–2 draw with Vauxhall Motors in opening game of the 2002–03 season and would go on to make a further 11 appearances for Celtic before leaving the club.

== Honours ==
=== Club ===
Leigh RMI

- President's Cup runner-up: 1998–99
- Northern Premier League Premier Division: 1999–2000

=== Individual ===
- Leigh RMI Players' Player of the Year: 2000–01
