= Frederick P. Salvucci =

American civil engineer and educator (born 1940)

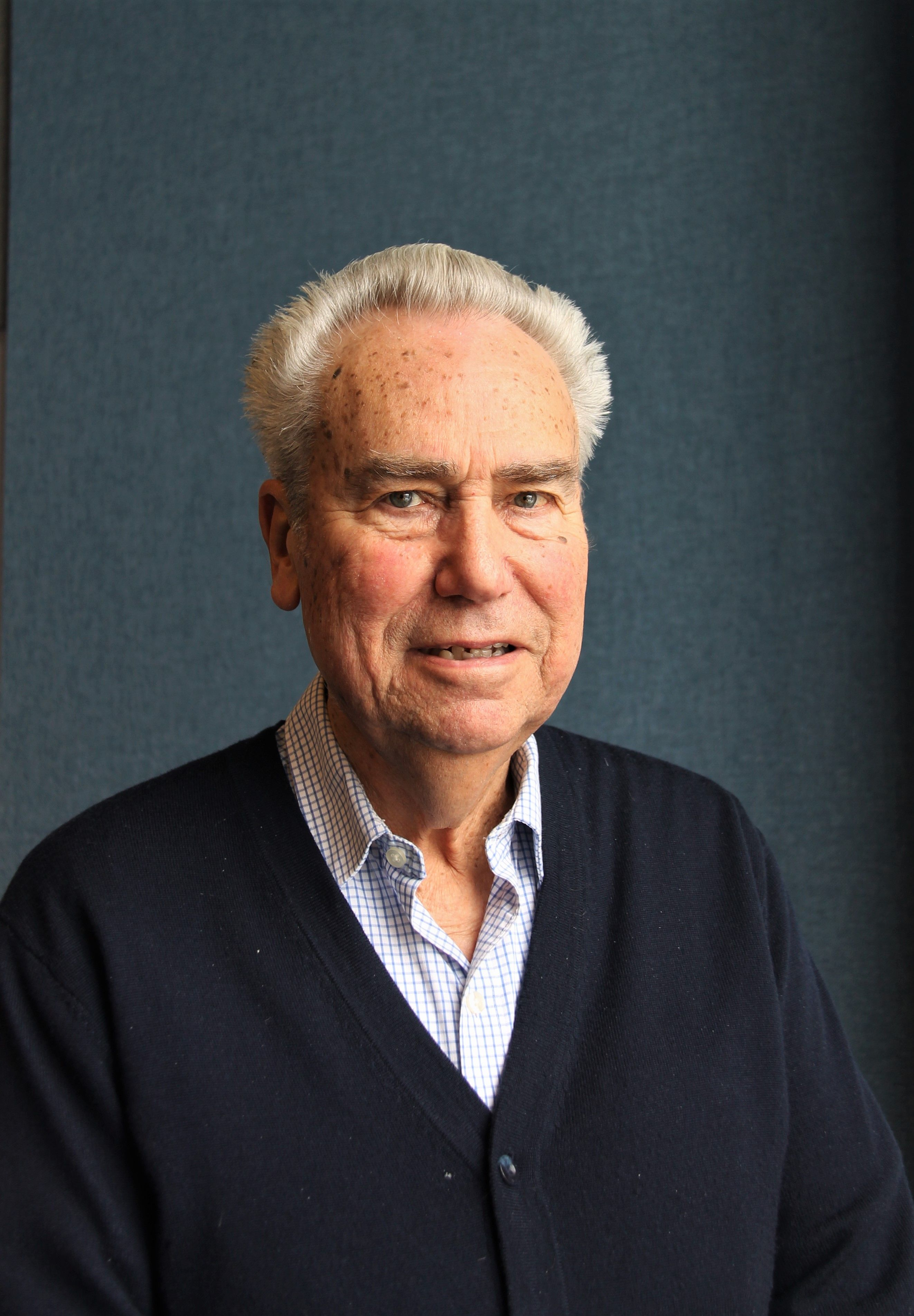
- Fred Salvucci (2019)

Massachusetts Secretary of Transportation
- In office 1975–1979
- Governor: Michael Dukakis
- Preceded by: Alan A. Altshuler
- Succeeded by: Barry Locke
- In office 1983–1991
- Governor: Michael Dukakis
- Preceded by: James Carlin
- Succeeded by: Richard L. Taylor

Personal details
- Born: Frederick Peter Salvucci; April 8, 1940 (age 86) Brighton, Massachusetts, United States
- Education: Massachusetts Institute of Technology
- Occupation: Civil engineer Educator

Frederick "Fred" Peter Salvucci (born April 8, 1940) is an American civil engineer and educator, who specializes in transportation issues. Salvucci was the Secretary of Transportation for the Commonwealth of Massachusetts under Governor Michael Dukakis, serving a total of 12 years. He is currently a Senior Lecturer at the MIT Center for Transportation and Logistics.

== Career ==
Born in Brighton, Salvucci graduated from Boston Latin School in 1957. He then attended the Massachusetts Institute of Technology, where he received his Bachelor of Science in 1961 and his Master of Science in 1962, both in civil engineering with a specialization in transportation. At MIT, he was a member of Chi Epsilon and the American Society of Civil Engineers. From 1964 to 1965, he spent a year abroad as a Fulbright Scholar at the University of Naples Federico II, where he studied investments in transportation to stimulate economic development in high poverty areas of Southern Italy.

From 1970 to 1974, Salvucci served as a transportation advisor to Boston's mayor, Kevin White. He subsequently served two terms as Massachusetts Secretary of Transportation under Michael Dukakis from 1975 to 1978 and 1983 to 1990. During his tenure, he gave particular emphasis to the expansion of the transit system, the development of financial and political support for the Big Dig, and the implementation of strategies in compliance with the Clean Air Act. Other efforts included the extension of the Red Line to Quincy and Alewife, the relocation of the Orange Line to the Southwest Corridor, the acquisition and modernization of MBTA Commuter Rail, the restructuring of the MBTA, and planning for the redevelopment of Park Square by placing the State Transportation Building there.

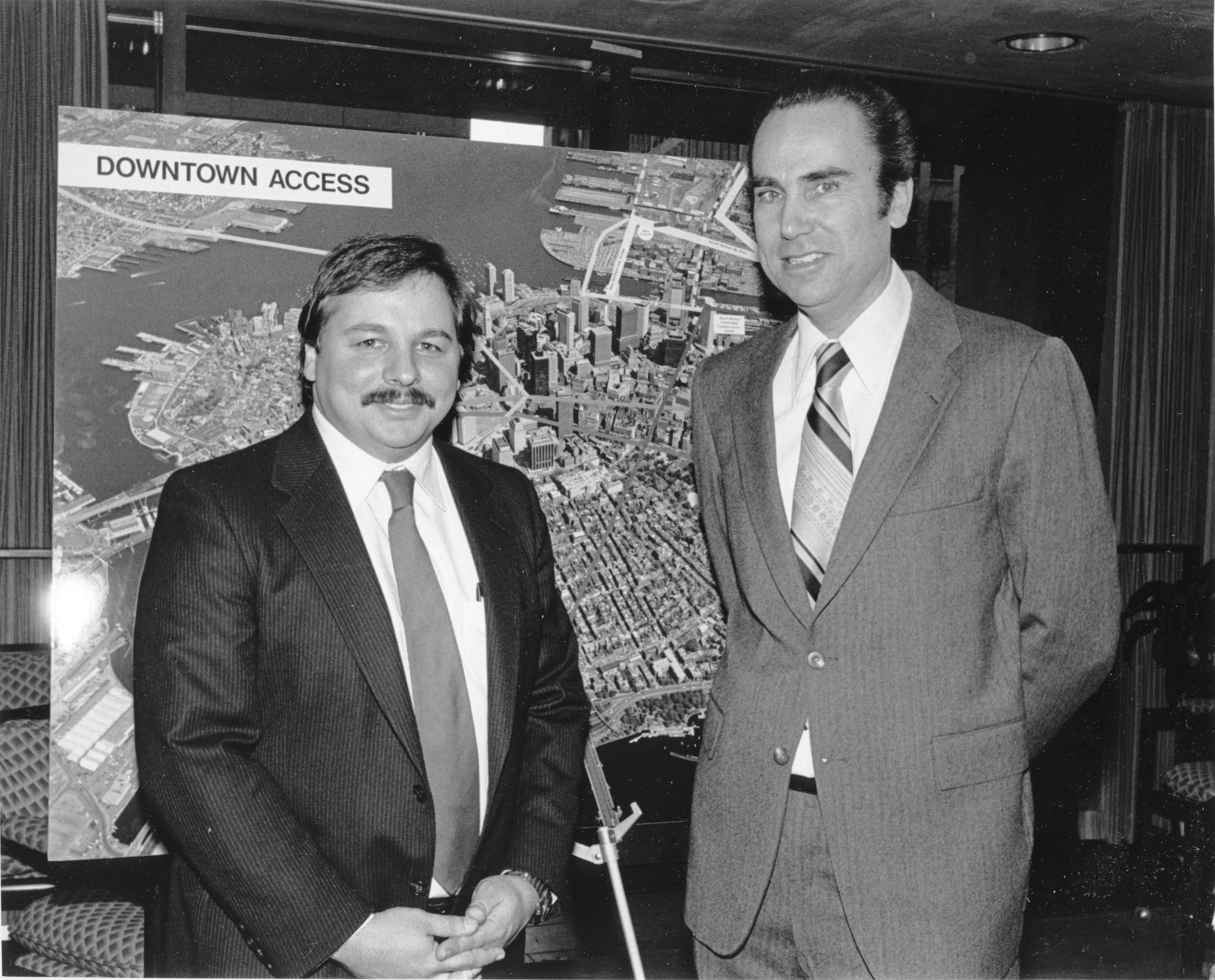
Salvucci (right) with Richard A. Dimino, then Boston Transportation Commissioner, c.1985

During 1994 to 2003, Salvucci was a key developer, in collaboration with professor Nigel Wilson (MIT), of an innovative research and educational collaborative with the University of Puerto Rico and the Puerto Rico Highway and Transportation Authority, focused on development of Tren Urbano, a new rail transit system for San Juan, which has now been replicated in Chicago, London, Hong Kong, and San Sebastian (Spain), as well as the MBTA. Salvucci has also participated in restructuring the commuter rail and urban transit system in Buenos Aires, Argentina to use concession contracts with the private sector to renew the physical capital of the rail systems, and to improve passenger service.

One of Salvucci's best-known projects is the "Big Dig" (Central Artery/Tunnel Project) in Boston that put an above-ground expressway underground, created a third Harbor Tunnel, and rejuvenated downtown Boston into an even more vibrant district. Salvucci created the vision, persuaded politicians on both state and national levels, and obtained the funds to complete this megaproject.

As of 2021, Salvucci is partly retired, but is still involved in the Allston Multimodal Project in Massachusetts. In the past, he has taught urban planning courses on transportation at MIT, and also at Harvard University's Graduate School of Design.
