= MBTA kickback schemes =

Between 1980 and 1981, Massachusetts Secretary of Transportation and Massachusetts Bay Transportation Authority (MBTA) Chairman Barry Locke and the Assistant Director of the MBTA's Real Estate Department Frank J. Walters, Jr. ran a number of kickback schemes at the MBTA. The kickbacks were discovered when newly appointed MBTA General Manager James O'Leary accidentally opened an envelope meant for Locke that contained the proceeds from one of the schemes. A total of seventeen people and one corporation were indicted for their roles in kickback schemes at the MBTA. Locke was convicted of five counts of bribery and sentenced to 7 to 10 years in prison. Locke is the only Massachusetts cabinet secretary to be convicted of a felony while in office since the state's adoption of the cabinet system in 1970.

== Background ==
In 1979, Barry M. Locke was appointed Massachusetts Secretary of Transportation by the state's new Governor, Edward J. King. In 1980, Locke took on a second role as acting chairman of the Massachusetts Bay Transportation Authority. After taking control of the MBTA, Locke hired his friend Frank J. Walters, Jr. to serve as Assistant Director of the MBTA's Real Estate Department. In 1981, a reorganization of the MBTA forced Locke to turn over the day-to-day operation of the MBTA to a general manager. After a three-month search, James O'Leary was chosen to take over management of the MBTA.

== Exposure ==
On April 30, 1981, Walters was unable to meet with Locke to deliver a kickback payment from a company that had been granted an advertising contract. Locke suggested that they use O'Leary as a go-between. Walters placed a large envelope with the words "To Jim O'Leary For B.M.L." written on it on O'Leary's desk and expected that O'Leary would deliver it to Locke. O'Leary found the envelope and, thinking that it read "To Jim O'Leary From B.M.L.", opened it. Inside were four progressively smaller envelopes, with the smallest containing ten $100 bills and a note instructing Locke to use a lower price when determining how much a Belmont man would have to pay for abandoned MBTA land. That evening, O'Leary went to the home of Massachusetts Attorney General Francis X. Bellotti and turned over the money and the envelopes to him.

The next morning, the serial numbers on the bills were noted and placed back in the series of envelopes. O'Leary met with Locke that afternoon. After Locke asked about the envelope, O'Leary handed it over to him. During the meeting, Locke left the conference table where he and O'Leary were seated to take a call at his desk. While there, he opened the envelopes and pocketed the money. Locke told O'Leary that the money was repayment of a loan he had made to Walters eight years ago. When O'Leary left, assistant attorney general Stephen R. Delinsky and two state troopers entered through another door and requested permission to search the office. Locke gave them permission. They seized the envelopes and the money. That same day, Locke was placed on an unpaid leave of absence from his posts after King learned that Locke was under investigation.

Meanwhile, Walters was called to a meeting in O'Leary's office. When Walters arrived at the office, he was met by two state troopers, who placed him under arrest. Walters confessed that the money was Locke's proceeds from one of many kickback schemes the two ran at the MBTA. He provided prosecutors with a detailed, 96-page long statement describing wrongdoing at the MBTA. Walters' statement led to the Attorney General's office questioning dozens of people, including MBTA employees and business executives. Walters agreed to cooperate with the Attorney General's office because he did not want to jeopardize the finalization of his and his wife's adoption of a baby boy. He and his lawyer negotiated an agreement in which he was promised that the Attorney General would not recommend incarceration in his case, the Attorney General's office would help him obtain employment, the Massachusetts State Police would provide him with protection during the investigation, and, if he so desired, he would be provided with a new identity and relocated to another part of the country.

== Indictments ==
On July 17, 1981, Locke and eight others, including his brother Alan, were indicted in connection with the Attorney General's investigation into kickbacks at the MBTA. A total of seventeen people and one corporation were indicted for their roles in kickback schemes at the MBTA. They were:

Name	Position	Charges
APCOA, Inc.	Parking-lot management firm	One count of making a corporate campaign contribution
John F. Becka	New England regional general manager of APCOA, Inc.	One count of making a corporate campaign contribution and one count violating a campaign contribution law
MaryAnne Blume	Co-owner of the T.J. Blume and Sons contracting firm	Two counts of bribery and two counts of conspiracy to commit bribery
Thomas Blume	Co-owner of the T.J. Blume and Sons contracting firm	Two counts of bribery and two counts of conspiracy to commit bribery
William R. Buckley	MBTA employee. Served as project manager during the renovation of the South Station MBTA station	Two counts of bribery, two counts of conflict of interest, two counts of conspiracy to commit bribery, and two counts of conspiracy to commit conflict of interest
James L. Champigny	Alcoholism counselor in the MBTA personnel counseling unit	One count of bribery
Joseph Damore	Co-owner of Dollar Rent-A-Car, a car rental agency based at Logan Airport	One count of bribery
Suzanne T. Harwood	MBTA employee. Served as assistant project manager of the MBTA's South Station project	Two counts of bribery, two counts of conflict of interest, two counts of conspiracy to commit bribery and two counts of conspiracy to commit conflict of interest
Walter Henneberry	Manager of concessions in the MBTA's real estate department	One count of violating a campaign-contribution law
Dennis January	Former CFO of the MBTA Commuter Rail system	One count of soliciting and accepting a bribe
Gary A. Lockberg	Pharmacist. Obtained a license to operate a pharmacy concession at South Station	One count of bribery
Alan Locke	Brother of Barry Locke and a publisher of an airline industry newspaper	Five counts of bribery, one count of larceny, two counts of conspiracy to commit bribery, and one count of conspiracy to commit larceny
Barry Locke	Massachusetts Secretary of Transportation and chairman of the MBTA	Nine counts of bribery, three counts of larceny, two counts of conspiracy to commit bribery, and three counts of conspiracy to commit larceny
Richard J. Ray	Co-owner of Dollar Rent-A-Car, a car rental agency based at Logan Airport	One count of bribery
David M. Smith	President of Amasoy, Inc., a parking lot management firm	One count of bribery
Thomas P. Snelders	MBTA engineer	Two counts of bribery, two counts of conflict of interest, two counts of conspiracy to commit bribery, six counts of bribery and two counts of conspiracy to commit bribery and two counts of conspiracy to commit conflict of interest
Robert Tatel	Boston attorney who had represented the MBTA	Six counts of bribery and two counts of conspiracy to commit bribery
Frank J. Walters, Jr.	Assistant director of the MBTA real estate division	Five counts of conspiracy to commit bribery and larceny

== Schemes ==
=== Walters' testimony ===
During Barry Locke's trial, Delinsky accused Locke of being the "mastermind" of twelve kickback schemes that netted about $60,000 between October 1980 and May 1981. Walters testified that

- William R. Buckley, Suzanne T. Harwood, and Thomas P. Snelders, who were secret partners in a drugstore, agreed to pay Locke and Walters $15,000 in exchange for a drugstore concession at South Station.
- Alan Locke received a $1000 kickback from the demolition of MBTA property in Roslindale and a $500 kickback from the demolition of MBTA property in Holbrook. Locke then split this money with Walters and "a third party".
- Locke told him to advise a group looking to purchase a parcel of MBTA land in Canton to hire Robert Tatel. Locke, Tatel, and Walters then split the $3,000 legal fee.
- He and Tatel brought Locke in on a scheme in which Tatel would receive $8,000 from Amasoy, Inc., a company that ran seven MBTA parking lots, in exchange for favorable changes to its agreements with the MBTA.
- Locke dissuaded Governor King from granting an MBTA advertising contract to a political supporter, citing a potential negative media reaction. Locke then convinced the president of New York Subway, Inc. the company that held the contract, to hire Tatel. The three arranged to rig the bid specifications so that New York Subway would be in a favorable position to win the contract. Tatel agreed to split his $25,000 legal fee with Walters and Locke.
- He solicited a $2,000 bribe from Joseph Damore and Richard J. Ray in exchange for a car rental concession at South Station. He split the bribe with Locke.
- One of his assistants, Walter Henneberry, solicited a $2,000 illegal campaign contribution to the Committee to Elect Edward J. King from APCOA (through its regional general manager John Becka). Henneberry took $1,000 of the contribution and donated it in his name. He gave the other $1,000 to Walters and instructed him to do the same. Instead, he kept $500 for himself and gave the other $500 to Locke.
- After receiving complaints about the condition of the parking lot at the Route 128 station, Locke told him "Maybe there's something in it for us." Locke instructed Walters to contact his brother, Alan. Alan Locke found a contractor, T.J. Bloom and Sons, that would do the job for $2,100 and added $2,000 to the price, which was split between the Lockes and Walters.

=== Other testimonies ===
James L. Champigny testified that he paid Walters $5,000 to secure a position as an alcoholism counselor with the MBTA. Dennis January testified that he received $125 from Walters for approving a demolition project in Roslindale that Walters was trying to secure for a contractor. Gail and Gary Lockberg testified that they entered into an agreement with Buckley, Harwood, and Snelders in which the five of them would be partners in a pharmacy at South Station and that Walters had sought $15,000 in exchange for the concession. Henneberry corroborated Walters' testimony that he received $2,000 from APCOA, but said that it was Walters' idea to deposit the money and write out checks in their own names, not his. Ralph Miller, a carpet installer who did work for the MBTA, testified that he and Walters agreed to increase the price on an MBTA carpet cleaning contract by $1,500 and that he, Walters, and Locke would split the $1,500 three-ways. Locke's assistant Jackie Hunt testified that Locke ordered her to hold all paperwork until the carpet cleaning bill was paid.

== Locke's defense ==
When Locke took the stand, he depicted himself as a busy chief executive who delegated tasks to his subordinates. He relied on underlings such as Walters to make decisions and routinely signed contracts without knowing what they concerned. He stated that the only money he had ever received from Walters was the $1,000 repayment of a loan that O'Leary delivered to him.

== Locke conviction and sentencing ==
On February 2, 1982, Locke was convicted on five counts of conspiracy to commit bribery and larceny. He became the first and only Massachusetts Cabinet Secretary to be convicted of a felony while in office since the state's adoption of the cabinet system in 1970. The remaining charges against him were dropped in exchange for Locke not appealing his conviction.

The prosecution requested a 4 to 5-year sentence. At the sentencing hearing, Judge Rudolph Pierce described Locke as having an "insatiable appetite" for payoffs and stated that for him "greed was seemingly the all-consuming virtue". Therefore, he believed that the prosecution's sentence request was insufficient because it could allow Locke to be out on parole within 16 months. He sentenced Locke to 7 to 10 years in Walpole State Prison. Pierce, however, had miscalculated the date when Locke would have been eligible for parole and on September 29, 1983 reduced his sentence to 6 to 10 years.

== Other cases ==
James Champigny offered to plead guilty, however, Judge Pierce instead continued his case for six months because he did not want to see Champigny, a cooperating witness, get a criminal record. If Champigny stayed out of trouble for those six months, the charges would be dismissed. Pierce also continued the cases of Dennis January, Richard J. Ray, Joseph Damore, and David M. Smith.

Tatel pleaded guilty to three counts of bribery and was sentenced to one year in prison, with four months to be served and eight to be suspended. Tatel also received two years probation and was ordered to complete 500 hours of community service. His law license was suspended indefinitely. His petition for reinstatement was granted in 1989, but his license was suspended again in 2001 in an unrelated case. Alan Locke pleaded guilty to bribery and received a suspended sentence. Thomas J. Blume pleaded guilty to bribery and received one year's probation.

Buckley, Harwood, and Snelders pleaded no contest to conflict of interest charges and each received a six-month suspended sentence.
