= Rush B. Lincoln Jr. =

United States Army general

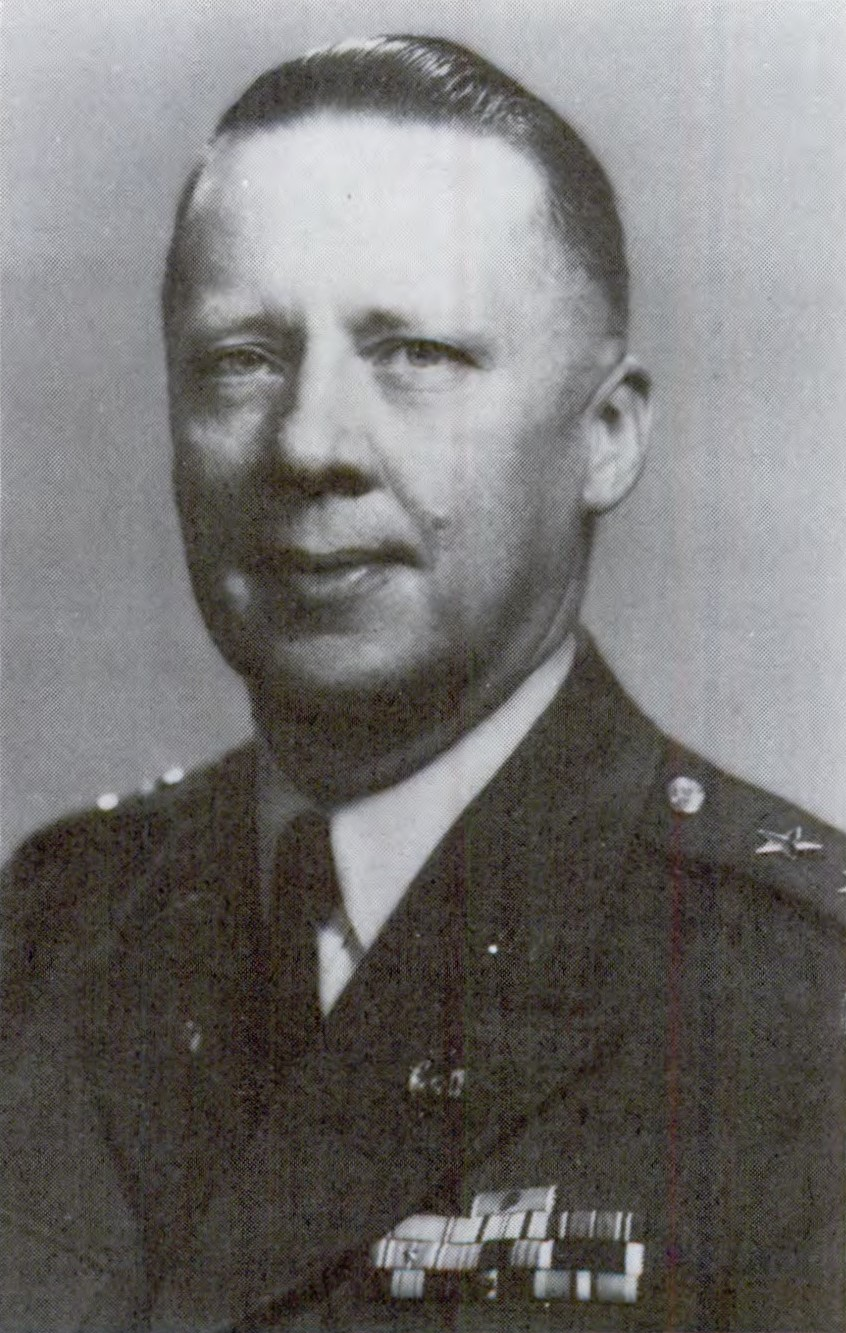

General manager of the Massachusetts Bay Transportation Authority
- In office 1965–1967
- Preceded by: Thomas McLernon
- Succeeded by: Leo J. Cusick

Commander, Defense Traffic Management Service
- In office 1963–1965
- Preceded by: I. Sewell Morris
- Succeeded by: John J. Lane^{1}

Chief of Transportation, HQDA
- In office 1962–1963
- Preceded by: Frank S. Besson Jr.
- Succeeded by: Edward W. Sawyer

Personal details
- Born: December 2, 1910 Fort Thomas, Kentucky
- Died: August 15, 2002 (aged 91) Wellesley, Massachusetts
- Resting place: West Point Cemetery; West Point, New York
- Education: United States Military Academy; Massachusetts Institute of Technology; Armed Forces Staff College; National War College
- Occupation: U.S. Army officer MBTA general manager
- Awards: Legion of Merit with two Oak leaf clusters Distinguished Service Medal

Military service
- Allegiance: United States
- Branch/service: United States Army
- Years of service: 1932–1965
- Rank: Major general

Rush Blodget Lincoln Jr. (December 2, 1910 – August 15, 2002) was an American major general in the United States Army. After his retirement from the Army, Lincoln served as general manager of the Massachusetts Bay Transportation Authority from 1965 to 1967.

== Early life ==
Lincoln was born in Fort Thomas, Kentucky on December 2, 1910. His father, Rush B. Lincoln Sr. was a major general in the United States Army. His grandfather was general James Rush Lincoln who fought in both the American Civil War and the Spanish-American War, as well as trained troops at Iowa State College during World War 1. His sister, J. Virginia Lincoln, was a physicist.

Lincoln later lived in Washington D.C., where he graduated from Western High School and Schad's School.

== United States Army ==
=== Early years ===
In 1932, Lincoln graduated at the top of his class at the United States Military Academy. He was appointed as a second lieutenant in the Army Corps of Engineers on June 10, 1932. In 1935, Lincoln received an M.S. degree in civil engineering from the Massachusetts Institute of Technology. His research project was a collaboration with Frank S. Besson Jr. and two other West Point classmates under the supervision of Glennon Gilboy. He was promoted to first lieutenant on September 22, 1935, and by 1942 was a lieutenant colonel.

=== World War II ===
Lincoln was promoted to colonel on September 13, 1944. During World War II, Lincoln took part in the seven conferences between the heads of state and the combined chiefs of staff (Washington, the first and Second Quebec Conferences, Cairo, Tehran, Malta, and Yalta). He was also a member of the Joint Staff Planning and the Army Forces Western Pacific, headquartered in Manila. During the final months of the war, Lincoln served as the chief of transportation in the Pacific Theatre.

=== Post-war ===
Lincoln remained in Manila for a year after the war and then attended the Armed Forces Staff College, where he was a member of the school's first class graduating in 1947. He was then assigned as the Assistant Commandant of the Transportation School. In 1950, he graduated from the National War College and was assigned as a special assistant to General Frank A. Heilman, the Army's Chief of Transportation. Lincoln was formally transferred to the Transportation Corps on January 5, 1951. In April 1951, he was assigned to the newly formed Logistics Division at the Supreme Headquarters Allied Powers Europe. The Logistics Division's mission was to develop facilities to enhance the military readiness of NATO countries as well as coordinate and develop plans to increase emergency preparedness. On October 2, 1954, Lincoln was promoted to brigadier general and that December he was assigned as the commanding general of Fort Eustis. On July 6, 1956, he was promoted to major general. In August 1958, Lincoln became the Deputy Chief of Transportation, HQDA. He was promoted to Chief in March 1962 and in July 1963 was named the commanding general of the Defense Traffic Management Service.

=== Decorations and badges ===
Lincoln was awarded the Legion of Merit with two Oak leaf clusters and the Distinguished Service Medal.

== Massachusetts Bay Transportation Authority ==
In 1965, Lincoln turned down a promotion to Lieutenant general to become the general manager of the Massachusetts Bay Transportation Authority (MBTA). He retired from the Army on January 31, 1965, and took over at the MBTA the following day. His appointment was championed by General James McCormack, the chairman of the MBTA board of directors and a former West Point classmate of Lincoln's.

During his tenure with the MBTA, Lincoln had difficulties with officials under him, who were appointed based on political affiliations and did not hold allegiance to Lincoln. He was publicly critical of deputy general managers Edward F. McLaughlin Jr. and Michael J. Powell, who he felt undercut his authority by dealing directly with the board of directors.

By 1967, the MBTA's deficit had grown to over $32 million annually and Lincoln came under pressure to resign. Lincoln resigned in September 1967, citing a "lack of understanding on the part of some people as how the affairs of the authority should be conducted and a lack of appreciation of the time it takes to plan and do a job so that it is done right the first time."

== Later life and death ==
Lincoln resided in Wellesley, Massachusetts following his retirement from the Army and remained there until his death on August 15, 2002. He was interred beside his second wife Dorothy Rita (Smith) Oxford at the West Point Cemetery on August 27, 2002.

== Note ==
1. On February 15, 1965 the Defense Traffic Management Service was succeeded by the Military Traffic Management and Terminal Service as a major command of the Department of the Army. John J. Lane was the first commander of the MTMTS.
