= J. Virginia Lincoln =

American physicist (1915-2003)

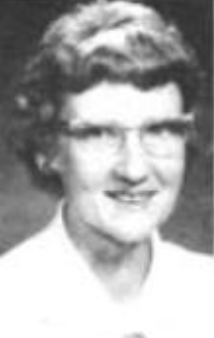
- J. Virginia Lincoln, from a 1976 publication of the US Commerce Department
- Born: September 7, 1915; Ames, Iowa, U.S.
- Died: August 1, 2003 (aged 87); Boulder, Colorado, U.S.
- Occupation: Physicist

Jeannette Virginia Lincoln (September 7, 1915 – August 1, 2003) was an American physicist.

== Early life ==
Lincoln was born on September 7, 1915, in Ames, Iowa. He parents were Rush B. Lincoln and Jeannette Bartholomew Lincoln. Her father was a major general in the US Army Air Forces. Lincoln's mother taught chemistry at Iowa State College. Her brother, Rush B. Lincoln Jr. became a Major General in the US Army. Their grandfather was general James Rush Lincoln who fought in both the American Civil War and the Spanish-American War, as well as trained troops at Iowa State College during World War 1. Lincoln was unsurprisingly deep into her family's military life and continued with this throughout her life.

Lincoln studied at Dana Hall in Wellesley, Massachusetts and went on to earn a bachelor's degree in physics from Wellesley College. She received a master's degree from Iowa State College in 1938. Simultaneously, she was an instructor in household equipment at Iowa State from 1936 to 1942, instructing students how to use new electronics and devices.

== Career ==
In 1942, Lincoln began work in the Interservice Radio Propagation Laboratory (later renamed the Central Radio Propagation Laboratory or CRPL) at the National Bureau of Standards (NBS) in Washington, D.C. In 1946 the CRPL (Central Radio Propagation Laboratory) was created in order to keep information and research in a one place and to provide radio propagation predictions. These predictions included the investigation of solar and geophysical effects as well as ionospheric data. In 1954 CRPL moved to Boulder, Colorado and Lincoln's first job was a radio weather forecaster. She prepared monthly ionospheric prediction contour maps. These predictions were used in selecting frequencies for long distance radio communications. In 1949, Lincoln helped create a statistical method for predicting sunspot activity that is still used today. In 1966, she became director for the World Data Center for Solar-Terrestrial Physics. She later became the Solar-Terrestrial Physics division chief for NOAA's National Geophysical and Solar-Terrestrial Data Center. From there she worked at the Data Center from 1966 until 1980, the year of her retirement.

== Later life ==
In 1973, she received the Department of Commerce Gold Medal for Distinguished Service. She was also inducted into the Colorado Women's Hall of Fame in 2000.

After Lincoln retired, she became involved with the Boulder Historical Museum, traveled extensively, and played golf.

Lincoln died in Boulder at the age of 87, August 1, 2003.
