= Thomas McLernon =

American transportation executive

Thomas J. McLernon

General manager of MTA/MBTA
- In office 1960–1964
- Preceded by: Edward Dana
- Succeeded by: Rush B. Lincoln Jr.

General manager of New York City Transit Authority
- In office 1955–1960
- Preceded by: Sidney H. Bingham
- Succeeded by: James B. Edmunds

Personal details
- Born: Jersey City, New Jersey
- Died: May 14, 1986 (aged 80) Spring Lake Heights, New Jersey

Thomas J. McLernon was an American transportation executive who served as general manager of the New York City Transit Authority and the Massachusetts Bay Transportation Authority.

== Lehigh Valley Railroad ==
McLernon was born in Jersey City, New Jersey. He spent the first thirty years of his career with the Lehigh Valley Railroad. He began with the railroad in 1920 as a messenger and then served as a clerk, yardmaster, freight agent, and finally as the superintendent of all stations. In 1934 he organized and was elected president of the Lehigh Valley Railroad's first local of the Brotherhood of Railway and Steamship Clerks.

== New York City ==
In 1955, McLernon became the general manager of the New York City Transit Authority. During his tenure, McLernon was able to eliminate the system's deficit. He also ordered the installation of automatic coin turnstiles in the New York City Subway.

== Boston ==
In May 1960, McLernon was named general manager of the Metropolitan Transit Authority. He was given an 11-year contract and took office on July 1. During his tenure, McLernon battled the MTA's advisory board, the Massachusetts General Court, and the Carmen's Union, which went on strike twice during McLernon's time in office. On August 4, 1964, the MTA was taken over by the newly formed Massachusetts Bay Transportation Authority. McLernon was chosen to manage the new system. On December 30, 1964, the MBTA board of directors elected to terminate McLernon. Director Robert P. Springer criticized McLernon for having "no concept that the job of management is not the job of a dictator", for mismanaging authority personnel, and for having a "vendetta with the Carmen's Union". He stated that the board chose to terminate McLernon after "his own subordinates disagreed with him and came to the board". McLernon in turn criticized the MTA/MBTA board for not giving him a "free hand to run the system", which prevented him from addressing the major problems besetting the MTA/MBTA. He also criticized the MBTA employees for being loyal to the Carmen's Union and not to "the organization that pays them".

== New Jersey ==
After leaving Boston, McLernon moved to South Orange, New Jersey. He worked in the railroad division of the New Jersey Department of Transportation and the New Jersey State Department of Commutation. He retired in 1970 and that same year moved to Spring Lake Heights, New Jersey. Following his retirement, McLernon worked for many years as a transportation consultant.

McLernon died on May 14, 1986, at his home in Spring Lake Heights. He was 80 years old.
