= Barry Locke =

American politician (1930-2007)

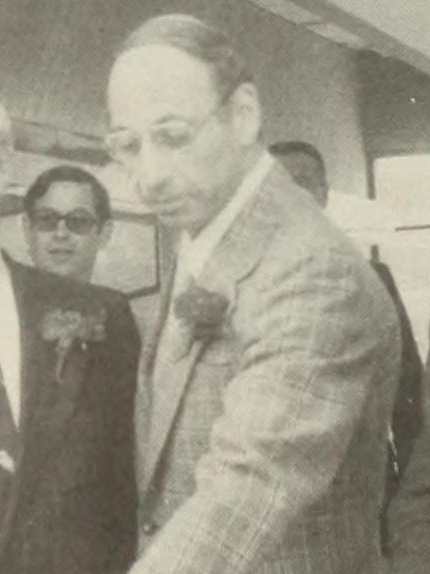
- Locke in 1979

Massachusetts Secretary of Transportation
- In office 1979–1981
- Preceded by: Frederick P. Salvucci
- Succeeded by: James Carlin

Vermont Secretary of Civil and Military Affairs
- In office 1961–1963
- Preceded by: Franklin S. Billings, Jr.
- Succeeded by: T. Wesley Grady

Personal details
- Born: December 21, 1930 Boston, Massachusetts, United States
- Died: March 4, 2007 (aged 76) Rockville, Maryland, United States
- Parent(s): Arthur Locke (father); Lillian Mahler (mother)
- Relatives: Alan (brother)
- Education: Boston University
- Occupation: Politician

Barry Myles Locke (December 21, 1930 – March 4, 2007) was an American politician who served as Massachusetts Secretary of Transportation from 1979 until he was indicted for corruption in 1981.

== Early life ==
Born to Arthur "Leo" Locke and Lillian Mahler, Locke graduated from Boston University with a Bachelor of Arts in 1953. He served two years in the United States Army as a public information officer. After the military, Locke spent five years as a newspaper editor in Michigan before returning to New England as Vermont bureau chief for the United Press International.

== Early government career ==
Locke's government career began in 1961 as the chief administrator and press secretary to the Vermont Governor F. Ray Keyser, Jr. Later that year he became the state's Secretary of Civil and Military Affairs.

In 1963, Locke was appointed public information officer in the office of the Internal Revenue Service's assistant regional commissioner for administration.

=== Aide to John A. Volpe ===
From 1964 to 1969 Locke served as press secretary to Governor John A. Volpe. When Volpe became United States Secretary of Transportation after the election of Richard M. Nixon, he joined him as a personal aide.

After Volpe's departure as transportation secretary, Locke served as the public relations director for the Office of Economic Opportunity and Director of the Office of Energy Policy John Arthur Love.

While working in Washington, he served as the manager for middleweight boxer Leo Saenz.

=== Bi-State Development Agency ===
In 1977, Locke was appointed executive director of the Bi-State Development Agency. In this position he oversaw St. Louis's transportation network and managed a 2,400-employee workforce.

== Secretary of Transportation and Chairman of the MBTA ==
In 1979, Locke joined the cabinet of Massachusetts Governor Edward J. King as Secretary of Transportation. In 1980, Locke took on a second role as acting chairman of the Massachusetts Bay Transportation Authority ("The T").

In 1981, a reorganization of the MBTA forced Locke to turn over the day-to-day operation of The T to a general manager.

On May 1, 1981, Locke was placed on an unpaid leave of absence from his MBTA and cabinet posts after Governor King learned that Massachusetts Attorney General Francis X. Bellotti was investigating Locke for accepting kickbacks.

=== Indictment and conviction ===
On July 17, 1981, Locke and eight others were indicted for their roles in a kickback scheme at the MBTA.

On February 2, 1982, Locke was convicted on five counts of conspiracy to commit bribery and larceny. Locke is the only Massachusetts Cabinet Secretary to be convicted of a felony while in office since the state's adoption of the cabinet system in 1970.

At sentencing, the prosecution requested a four- to five-year sentence. However, Judge Rudolph Pierce, who described Locke as having an "insatiable appetite" for payoffs, believed that the prosecution's sentence request was insufficient because it could allow Locke to be out on parole within 16 months. He sentenced Locke to 7 to 10 years in Walpole State Prison.

== Prison ==
Locke began serving his sentence on March 19, 1982, in Walpole State Prison, but was later transferred to Concord State Prison for the classification process. On July 1, he was transferred to the medium-security Berkshire House of Correction. On December 23, he was transferred to the Lawrence House of Correction on the basis of family hardship. While in prison, Locke was the editor of a jailhouse newspaper.

On September 29, 1983, Judge Pierce reduced Locke's sentence to 6 to 10 years, as he had miscalculated the date when Locke would have been eligible for parole.

On March 19, 1984, Locke was released on parole.

== Later life and death ==
Locke later left Massachusetts and moved to Montgomery Village, Maryland. For five years he was the president of CHI Centers, a Silver Spring, Maryland-based organization that serves the developmentally disabled. In 2006 he received the Spirit to Serve Award from Marriott International.

Locke died on March 4, 2007, of a heart attack.
