= Ryder (surname) =

Ryder is a surname, and may refer to:

== A ==
- Aaron Ryder, American film producer
- Albert Pinkham Ryder (1847–1917), American painter
- Alexandre Ryder (1891–1966), French film director
- Alfred Ryder (1916–1995), American actor
- Alfred Ryder (Royal Navy officer) (1820–1888), British admiral
- Andre Ryder (1908–1971), Greek-Egyptian composer
- Angela Ryder, Wilman Noongar activist and community leader from Western Australia w
- Arthur W. Ryder (1877–1938), American professor of Sanskrit and translator
- Azure Ryder (born 1996), Australian singer-songwriter

== B ==
- Barbara G. Ryder, American computer scientist
- Bill Ryder-Jones (born 1983), English singer-songwriter
- Bob Ryder (1956–2020), American wrestling journalist

== C ==
- Calvin Ryder (1810–1890), American architect
- Carl Ryder (1858–1923), Danish naval officer and Arctic explorer
- Charles Henry Dudley Ryder (1868–1945), English army officer and explorer
- Charles W. Ryder Jr. (1920–2010), United States Army major-general
- Charles W. Ryder (1892–1960), United States Army major-general
- Chauncey Foster Ryder (1868–1949), American painter
- Chris Ryder (squash player) (born 1980), English squash player
- Chris Ryder (journalist) (1947–2020), Northern Irish journalist and author
- Conroy Ryder, 8th Earl of Harrowby (born 1951), British peer and chartered surveyor
- Cynthia Ryder (born 1966), American rower

== D ==
- David Ryder (sailor) (1934–1985), Irish competitive sailor
- David J. Ryder (born 1955), Director of the United States Mint
- Deb Ryder, American blues singer and songwriter
- Dennis Ryder, South African politician
- Derek Ryder (born 1947), English footballer
- Dial D. Ryder (1938–2011), American gunsmith
- Don Ryder, Baron Ryder of Eaton Hastings (1916–2003), British businessman and peer
- Donald J. Ryder, American military lawyer
- Donald P. Ryder (1926–2021), American architect
- Douglas Ryder (born 1971), South African cyclist
- Dudley Ryder (judge) (1691–1756), British lawyer, writer and politician
- Dudley Ryder, 1st Earl of Harrowby (1762–1847), English politician
- Dudley Ryder, 2nd Earl of Harrowby (1798–1882), English politician
- Dudley Ryder, 3rd Earl of Harrowby (1831–1900), English politician
- Dudley Ryder, 6th Earl of Harrowby (1892–1987), English politician
- Dudley Ryder, 7th Earl of Harrowby (1922–2007), English banker
- Dylan Ryder (born 1981), American pornographic film actress

== E ==
- Eddie Ryder (1923–1997), American actor, writer and television director
- Edgar L. Ryder (1860–1936), American journalist, lawyer and politician from New York
- Edward Ryder (1948–2024), American politician from Ohio
- Elise Ryder Wikén (born 1968), Swedish politician
- Erin Ryder (born 1980), American producer and director in television and digital media
- Ernest Ryder (born 1957), British judge
- Eve Ryder (1896–1984), American artist in Nebraska

== F ==
- Fran Ryder (born 1954), Irish Gaelic footballer and coach
- Frank Ryder (1909–1978), English footballer
- Fred Ryder (1902–1974), Australian rules footballer
- Freddie Ryder (1942–2021), British singer and rhythm guitarist

== G ==
- George Lisle Ryder (1838–1905), British civil servant
- Gordon Ryder (1919–2000) English modernist architect
- Graham Ryder (1949–2002), English geologist and lunar scientist
- Granville Ryder (1799–1879) (1799–1879), British politician
- Granville Ryder (1833–1901) (1833–1901), British politician, son of Granville Ryder (1799–1879)
- Gregg Ryder (born 1987/8), English football player and coach
- Guy Ryder (born 1956), British civil servant

== H ==
- Hannah Ryder, Kenyan economist
- Henry Ryder (1777–1836), English Anglican bishop
- Henry Ryder (priest) (died 1755), English Anglican priest, Archdeacon of Derby
- Henry Ignatius Dudley Ryder (1837–1907), English Roman Catholic priest
- Henry Ryder, 4th Earl of Harrowby (1836–1900), English peer

== I ==
- Irene Ryder (1949–2024), Hong Kong English pop singer

== J ==
- Jack Ryder (actor) (born 1981), British actor
- Jack Ryder (American football) (1871–1936), American college football player, coach and sportswriter
- Jack Ryder (cricketer) (1889–1977), Australian cricketer
- Jack Ryder (track and field) (died 1953), American track and field coach
- Jack McBride Ryder (born 1928), American college head
- Jack Van Ryder (1899–1967), American artist
- James A. Ryder (1800–1860), American Jesuit priest
- James Ryder, founder of Ryder System, Inc
- Janet Ryder (born 1955), Welsh politician
- Jeannine M. Ryder, United States Air Force major-general
- Jeremy Ryder (born 1954), British musician known professionally as Jack Hues
- Jesse Ryder (born 1984), New Zealand cricketer
- Jessica Ryder (born 1992), Australian volleyball player
- John Ryder (actor) (1814–1885), English actor
- John Ryder (bishop) (1697–1775), Archbishop of Tuam, Ireland
- John Ryder (boxer) (born 1988), British boxer
- John Ryder (Canadian politician) (1805–1872), Canadian politician from Nova Scotia
- John Ryder (priest) (died 1791), Irish Anglican priest
- John Ryder (scholar) (born 1951), American philosopher and university president in Azerbaijan
- John Ryder (state representative) (1862–1940), American state legislator in Iowa
- John Ryder (state senator) (1831–1911), American state legislator in Ohio and Iowa
- John A. Ryder (1852–1895), American zoologist
- John Ryder, 5th Earl of Harrowby (1864–1956), British peer and politician
- Jonathan Ryder, pseudonym of American thriller author Robert Ludlum (1927–2001)
- Justin Ryder (born 1980), Australian rugby league footballer

== K ==
- Kate Ryder, American businessperson
- Kathleen Ryder (born 1934), Irish camogie player
- Kenneth G. Ryder (1924–2012), American university president

== L ==
- Laurence Ryder (born 1966), Australian darts player
- Lewis Ryder (1941–2018), British theoretical physicist
- Lisa Ryder (born 1970), Canadian actress
- Loren L. Ryder (1900–1985), American sound engineer
- Lorne Ryder (born 1970), Canadian singer-songwriter and multi-instrumentalist
- Louis Ryder (1900–1955), English cricketer

== M ==
- Maggie Ryder, English singer-songwriter
- Mahler B. Ryder (1937–1992), American mixed-media artist and educator
- Margaret Ryder (1908–1998), British artist
- Mark Ryder, actor from Northern Ireland
- Mark Ryder (musician), English electronic musician, producer and DJ
- Matt Ryder, British musician
- Michael Ryder (born 1980), Canadian ice hockey player
- Mitch Ryder (born 1945), American musician

== N ==
- Nathaniel Ryder, 1st Baron Harrowby (1735–1803), British politician
- Nick Ryder (born 1941), American football player

== P ==
- Paddy Ryder (born 1988), Australian rules footballer
- Pamela Ryder (born 1949), American writer
- Patrick S. Ryder, United States Air Force major-general
- Paul Ryder, English musician
- Peter Ryder, American politician

== R ==
- Reginald Ryder (1875–1923), English cricketer
- Richard Ryder (actor) (1942–1995), American actor
- Richard Ryder (comedian) (born 1966), Canadian comedian and broadcaster
- Richard Ryder (politician, born 1766) (1766–1832), British politician
- Richard D. Ryder (born 1940), British psychologist and animal rights advocate
- Richard Ryder, Baron Ryder of Wensum (born 1949), British politician
- Robert Ryder (1908–1986), British Royal Navy officer and recipient of the Victoria Cross, and politician
- Robert Edward Ryder (1895–1978), British Army soldier and recipient of the Victoria Cross
- Ron Ryder (1922–1993), English rugby league footballer
- Rowland Ryder (1914–1996), English schoolmaster, journalist and cricket writer

== S ==
- Sam Ryder (born 25 June 1989), English singer, songwriter and producer
- Sam Ryder (golfer) (born 1989), American golfer
- Samuel Ryder (1858–1936), British businessman and golf enthusiast
- Sean Ryder (born 1987), British water polo player
- Serena Ryder (born 1983), Canadian singer-songwriter
- Shaun Ryder (born 1962), British singer-songwriter and poet
- Sophie Ryder (born 1963), British sculptor, painter, printmaker and collagist
- Stephen M. Ryder (born 1943), American journalist, poet and screenwriter
- Stuart Ryder (born 1973), English footballer
- Sue Ryder (Margaret Susan Cheshire, Baroness Ryder of Warsaw, Baroness Cheshire) (1924–2000), British Special Operations Executive agent, member of the First Aid Nursing Yeomanry and charity founder

== T ==
- Talia Ryder (born 2002), American stage and film actress
- Theodora Sturkow-Ryder (1876–1958), American concert pianist and composer
- Theodore Ryder (1916–1993), American, one of the first people to receive insulin as a treatment for diabetes
- Therese Ryder (born 1946), Eastern Arrernte artist from Australia
- Thomas Ryder (actor) (1735–1790), British actor and theatre manager
- Thomas Ryder (engraver) (1746–1810), English engraver
- Thomas Philander Ryder (1836–1887), American musician
- Thomas O. Ryder (born c.1944), American business executive
- Tom Ryder (baseball) (1863–1935), American baseball player
- Tom Ryder (politician) (born 1949), American lawyer and politician from Illinois
- Tom Ryder (rugby union) (born 1985), Anglo-Scottish rugby union footballer

== W ==
- Will Ryder (born 1960), American pornographic film director
- William Ryder (Archdeacon of Cloyne) (1790–1862), Church of Ireland cleric
- William Ryder (mayor) (died 1611), Lord Mayor of London
- William Ryder (MP) (died 1432/3), English Member of Parliament
- William Ryder (rugby union) (born 1982), Fijian rugby union footballer
- William T. Ryder (1913–1992), first American paratrooper
- Winona Ryder (born 1971), American actress
- Worth Ryder (1884–1960), American artist, curator and academic

== X ==
- Xanthe Ryder (1926–1998), British alpine skier

== Z ==
- Zack Ryder, a ring name of American wrestler Matt Cardona (born 1985)

== See also ==
- Rider (surname)
