= Rider (surname) =

Rider is a surname, and may refer to:

- Amy Rider (born 1985), Japanese-American actress and film director
- Arthur Grover Rider (1886–1975), American painter
- Barnham Rider (c.1683–1728), English politician
- Corinne Rider-Kelsey (1877–1947), American soprano singer
- Cornelia Rider-Possart (1865–1963), American pianist
- Daniel Rider (1938–2008), American mathematician
- Elizabeth Rider, English actress
- Fran Rider, Canadian ice hockey player and executive
- Fremont Rider (1885–1962), American writer and librarian
- George Rider (1890–1979), American college sports coach and administrator
- Gertrude Tressel Rider (1876–1968), American librarian
- Henry Rider (died 1696), Anglican bishop in Ireland
- Ira E. Rider (1868–1906), American lawyer and politician from New York
- Isaiah Rider (born 1971), American basketball player
- James Rider (1797–1876), American politician from New York
- Jane H. Rider (1889–1981), American engineer
- John Rider (bishop) (1562–1632), English cleric and lexicographer
- John F. Rider (1900–1985), American radio engineer and author
- Mary Rider (born 1876), American screenwriter, playwright and short story writer
- Matt Rider (born 1988), British electronic sports player and commentator
- Michael Rider, American fashion designer
- Rich Rider, American basketball coach
- Scott Rider (born 1977), British bobsledder, shot putter and Highland games competitor
- Seth Rider (born 1997), American triathlete
- Stephen Rider (born 1979), American film and television actor
- Steve Rider (born 1950), English sports presenter and anchorman
- Thomas Rider (MP for Kent) (1785–1847), British politician
- Thomas Rider (MP for Maidstone) (c. 1648 – by 1704), English politician
- Thomas LaFayette Rider (1856–1932), American Cherokee politician from Oklahoma
- Timothy Byron Rider (1848–1917), Canadian merchant and political figure in Quebec
- William Rider (1723–1785), English historian, Anglican priest and writer

== See also ==
- Ryder (surname)
