= John Rider =

John Rider may refer to:

- John Rider (bishop) (1562–1632), scholar and Anglican Bishop of Killaloe
- John Rider (Alex Rider), a character in Anthony Horowitz's Alex Rider books
- John Francis Rider (engineer) (1900–1985), instructional writer of vacuum tube radio repair
- John Francis Rider (philatelist) (1900–1985), American philatelist

== See also ==
- John Rider House, a historic building in Danbury, Connecticut
- John Ryder (disambiguation)
