= William Ryder =

William Ryder may refer to:

- William Ryder (rugby union) (born 1982), Fijian rugby union footballer
- William T. Ryder (1913–1992), first American paratrooper, later a brigadier general
- William Ryder (mayor) (died 1611), Lord Mayor of London
- William Ryder (MP) (died 1432/33), MP for Totnes

== See also ==
- William Rider (1723–1785), English historian and priest
- Bill Ryder-Jones (born 1983), English musician and singer-songwriter
