= John Ryder =

John Ryder may refer to:

- John Ryder (bishop) (1697–1775), Archbishop of Tuam, Ireland
- John Ryder (priest) (died 1791), Irish Anglican priest
- John Ryder (Canadian politician) (1805–1872), Canadian politician from Nova Scotia
- John Ryder (state senator) (1831–1911), American state legislator in Ohio and Iowa
- John Ryder (state representative) (1862–1940), American state legislator in Iowa
- John Ryder, 5th Earl of Harrowby (1864–1956), British peer and Conservative Member of Parliament
- John Ryder (actor) (1814–1885), English actor
- John Ryder (scholar) (born 1951), professor and president of Khazar University in Baku, Azerbaijan
- John Ryder (boxer) (born 1988), British boxer
- John A. Ryder (1852–1895), American zoologist
- John Ryder, villain from the 1986 film The Hitcher and its 2007 remake

== See also ==
- Jack Ryder (disambiguation)
- John Rider (disambiguation)
