= Jack Ryder =

Jack Ryder may refer to:

- Jack Ryder (actor) (born 1981), British actor
- Jack Ryder (cricketer) (1889–1977), Australian cricketer
- Jack Ryder (American football) (1871–1936), American sportswriter and football coach
- Jack McBride Ryder (born 1928), second president of Saginaw Valley State College
- Jack Van Ryder (1899–1967), American artist
- Jack Ryder, character in the Canadian animated series Odd Job Jack
- Jack Ryder, real name of the DC Comics character Creeper

== See also ==
- John Ryder (disambiguation)
