= Naomh Aoife Camogie Club =

- Founded: 1934
- County: Dublin
- Colours: Navy and red
- Grounds: Phoenix Park

Senior Club Championships
	All Ireland	Leinster champions	Dublin champions
Camogie:	0	0	1

Playing colours
- Full name: Naomh Aoife Camogie Club

Naomh Aoife is a camogie club that won the Dubin championship in 1966 and which was associated with many of the leading personalities in the game.

== Notable players ==
Notable players include Kathleen Ryder, Patricia Timmons Eithne Ryder Judy Doyle the Whelan sisters, Sally Blake, Phyllis Cambell, Doreen Rogers,

== Colours ==
Naomh Aoife wore a navy gym tunic with two red bars around the skirt with a white blouse. When they played Celtic, Celtic being the younger had to take off their red bar
