= Eric Gilbertson =

Eric Gilbertson may refer to:

- Eric Gilbertson (climber), American professor of engineering at Seattle University and mountaineer
- Eric R. Gilbertson, American former president of Saginaw Valley State University
