= Henry Fitzsimon =

Irish writer

Henry Fitzsimon (Fitz Simon; 1566 or 1569 in Dublin – 29 November 1643 or 1645, probably at Kilkenny) was an Irish Jesuit controversialist.

== Life ==
Raised a Protestant, he was educated at Oxford (Hart Hall, and perhaps Christ Church), 1583-1587. Going to the University of Paris, he became a zealous supporter of Protestantism, "with the firm intention to have died for it, if need had been". But having engaged in controversy with "an owld English Jesuit, Father Thomas Darbishire, to my happiness I was overcome."

Having embraced Catholicism, he visited Rome and Flanders, where in 1592, he "elected to militate under the Jesuits' standard, because they do most impugn the impiety of heretics". In 1595, there was a call for Jesuits in Ireland, which had been deprived of them for ten years. With James Archer he refounded the mission there. Keeping chiefly to Dublin and Drogheda, he reconciled Protestants, and persistently challenged the chief Anglican divines. He laughed at his capture in 1600. "Now", he said, "my adversaries cannot say that they do not know where to find me", and he would shout challenges from his prison window at every passing parson. His major opponents in controversy were James Ussher, Meredith Hanmer, and John Rider.

Banished in 1604, he visited Spain, Rome, and Flanders, 1611-1620. At the outbreak of the Thirty Years War in 1620, he served as chaplain to the Irish soldiers in the imperial army, and published a diary of his experiences. It is theorized that he returned to Flanders in 1621 and in 1630 went back to Ireland where he continued to work until the outbreak of the Civil War (1640).

He was under sentence of death, from which he escaped in the winter of 1641 to the Wicklow Mountains, and (possibly) died in Kilkenny.

== Works ==
- A controversial work in manuscript, at Oscott College, Birmingham, entitled "A revelation of contradictions in reformed articles of religion", dated 1633
- two manuscript treatises, now lost, against Rider
- "A Catholic Confutation" (Rouen, 1608)
- Britannomachia Ministrorum (1614)
- Pugna Pragensis (1620)
- Buquoii Quadrimestreiter, Auctore Constantio Peregrino (Brünn, 1621, several editions, also Italian and English versions)
- Catalogus Præcipuorum Sanctorum Hiberniæ (1611, several editions), drawing attention to Irish hagiography.

His "Words of Comfort to Persecuted Catholics", "Letters from a Cell in Dublin Castle", and "Diary of the Bohemian War of 1620", together with a sketch of his life, were published by Edmund Hogan (Dublin, 1881).

== See also ==
- Symon Semeonis
