= Adelaide Neilson =

British stage actress (1848–1880)

Lilian Adelaide Neilson
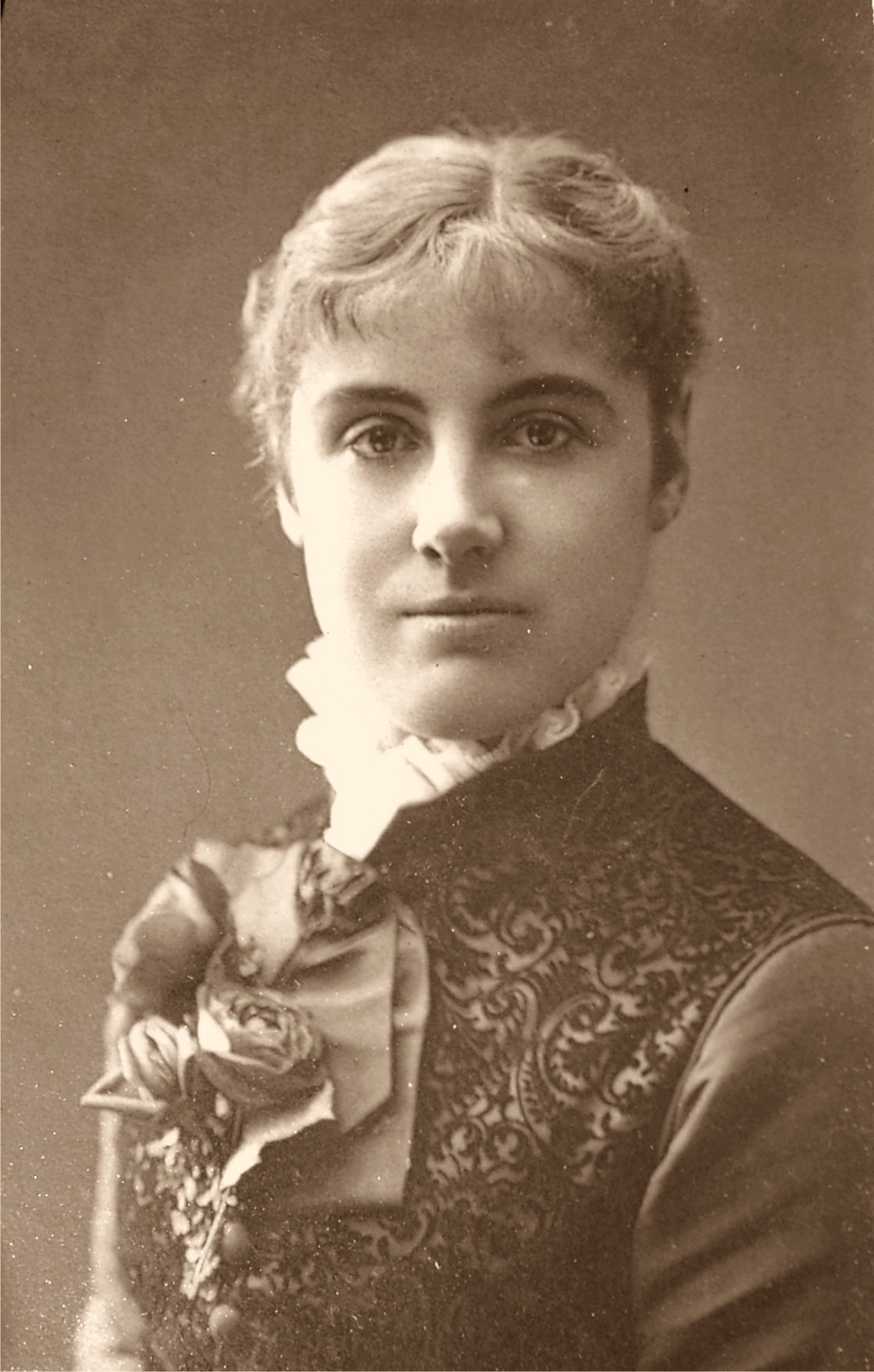
- Born: Elizabeth Ann Brown; 3 March 1848; Leeds, England
- Died: 15 August 1880 (aged 32); Paris, France
- Occupation: actress
- Spouse: Philip Henry Lee (m 1864; div 1877)
- Parent(s): Anne Brown (mother); Samuel Bland (stepfather)

Lilian Adelaide Neilson (3 March 1848 – 15 August 1880), born Elizabeth Ann Brown, was a British stage actress.

== Early life ==
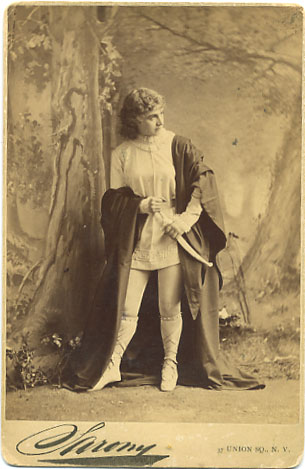
Image of Neilson created by Napoleon Sarony

Neilson was the daughter of an actress, Anne Brown, and was born, out of wedlock, at 35 St Peters Square Leeds in the West Riding of Yorkshire. In childhood she was known as Elizabeth Anne Bland, her mother having subsequently married a mechanic and house decorator named Samuel Bland. She grew up in relative poverty, initially in Skipton and later Guiseley, West Yorkshire (near Leeds). She attended a Wesleyan Methodist Sunday school and then worked at a mill in Guiseley and as a nursery maid.

When she was about 15 years old Neilson secretly left her home and made her way to London. Soon after she reached London, she obtained employment because of her beauty, as a member of the ballet at one of the theatres, and in that way she began her professional career. Various romantic tales were later printed concerning her way of life at that time.

== Marriage ==
She married Philip Henry Lee, the son of a clergyman resident at Stoke Bruerne, Northamptonshire, on 30 November 1864 at St. Mary's Church, Newington, Surrey using the name Lilian Adelaide Lizon. She was 16 or 17 years old at the time of her marriage. At her later adult baptism at St. Peter's Church, Leeds on 30 December 1866 (born 3 March 1848) she claimed to be named Lilian Adelaide Lizon, daughter of the Spanish couple Pierre and Annie Lizon of St. Peters Square, and Pierre's quality being described as gentleman.

== Stage career ==
In the spring of 1865, after having received some instruction from the veteran actor John Ryder, she appeared at Sarah Thorne's Theatre Royal (Margate), long a training-school for novices, where she made a favourable impression. In 1865, at Theatre Royal (Margate), she appeared as Julia in The Hunchback, a character with which her name was long to be associated.

For the next few years, she played at London and provincial theatres in various roles, including Rosalind, Amy Robsart and Rebecca (in Ivanhoe), Beatrice, Viola and Isabella (in Measure for Measure). In July 1865 she was brought out at the New Royalty Theatre, London, in the character of Juliet. Her achievement was not considered extraordinary, but it attracted some favourable attention, and she was able to continue with acting. She was a part of a production of The Huguenot Captain by Watts Phillips given by the Princess Theatre on 2 July 1866. Neilson played the role of the heroine Gabrielle de Savigny. In November 1866 she received favourable reviews for her portrayal of Victorine, another character in The Huguenot Captain. This time the play was performed at the Adelphi Theatre. She also played Nelly Armroyd, in Lost in London. Phillips was pleased with her acting; so was the critic Joseph Knight and the dramatist John Westland Marston; and all of them promoted her career.

In 1868 she had become an experimental travelling star, acting Rosalind, Bulwer's Pauline, and Knowles' Julia; but she was not successful at first, and during the next three or four years she took a variety of jobs, sometimes acting in metropolitan stock companies, and sometimes taking better positions. One of the expedients that she early adopted was that of a dramatic recital, given at St. James' Hall, London. Long afterwards she repeated that recital in America, with brilliant effect. Some of the parts that she played, at various London theatres, were: Lillian, in Dr Marston's Life for Life; Madame Vidal, in A Life Chase, by John Oxenford and Horace Wigan; and Mary Belton, in Uncle Dick's Darling. In 1870 she gained a conspicuous success as the eponymous heroine Amy Robsart, a part that suited her well, in a new play adaptation of Sir Walter Scott's novel Kenilworth by Andrew Halliday; and in 1871 she obtained critical admiration as Rebecca, in a play based on Sir Walter Scott's Ivanhoe.

== American stage ==
By 1872 she was hugely popular and, after making a successful tour of British cities and giving a series of farewell performances in London, she came to America, where her agent was Edwin F. De Nyse. She made her first American appearance on 18 November 1872, at Booth's Theatre, New York City, as Juliet.

She was praised by American critics who echoed the acclaim she had received from London theatrical audiences. The American drama critic William Winter wrote that: "Her face just sufficiently unsymmetrical to be brimful of character [,...] the carriage of her body [...] like that of a pretty child in the unconscious fascination of infancy [...] and above all of these [...] was a voice of perfect music."

She made subsequent American tours throughout the 1870s. She played Amy Robsart, heroine of Sir Walter Scott's historical novel Kenilworth (1821), in May 1873. She is noted for a fine engagement staged in Brooklyn, New York the same year. Her farewell at Booth's Theatre came on 2 May 1874. Neilson accepted an engagement at the Lyceum in the autumn that year. She performed in Cymbeline by William Shakespeare at the Fifth Avenue Theatre in New York on 14 May 1877. She not only achieved distinction on the American stage, but accumulated a considerable fortune. The parts that she acted in America included Juliet, Rosalind, Viola, Beatrice, Imogen and Isabella, from Shakespeare and Amy Robsart, Julia, Pauline and Lady Teazle, from other authors.

== Personal life ==
In 1877 she obtained a divorce from her husband and did not remarry. An account, told some time later, of an alleged marriage to Edward Compton, an English actor, proved untrue.

== Death ==
Neilson was on the stage for about 15 years. She died suddenly whilst riding in the Bois de Boulogne park, Paris, France on 15 August 1880, aged 32. A subsequent post-mortem stated death was caused by blood loss due to a rupture in the broad ligament near the left fallopian tube.

== Commemoration ==
Neilson is buried in Brompton Cemetery, London, where a sculptured cross of white marble bearing the inscription "Gifted and Beautiful—Resting" marks her grave.

She left an estate worth £25,000, which provided the funds for a theatrical charity named the Adelaide Neilson Fund in her honour.

Neilson's name is one of those featured on the sculpture Ribbons, unveiled in 2024.

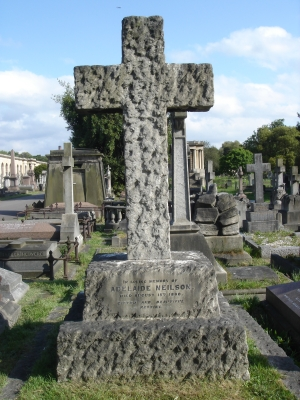
Gravestone, Brompton Cemetery, London

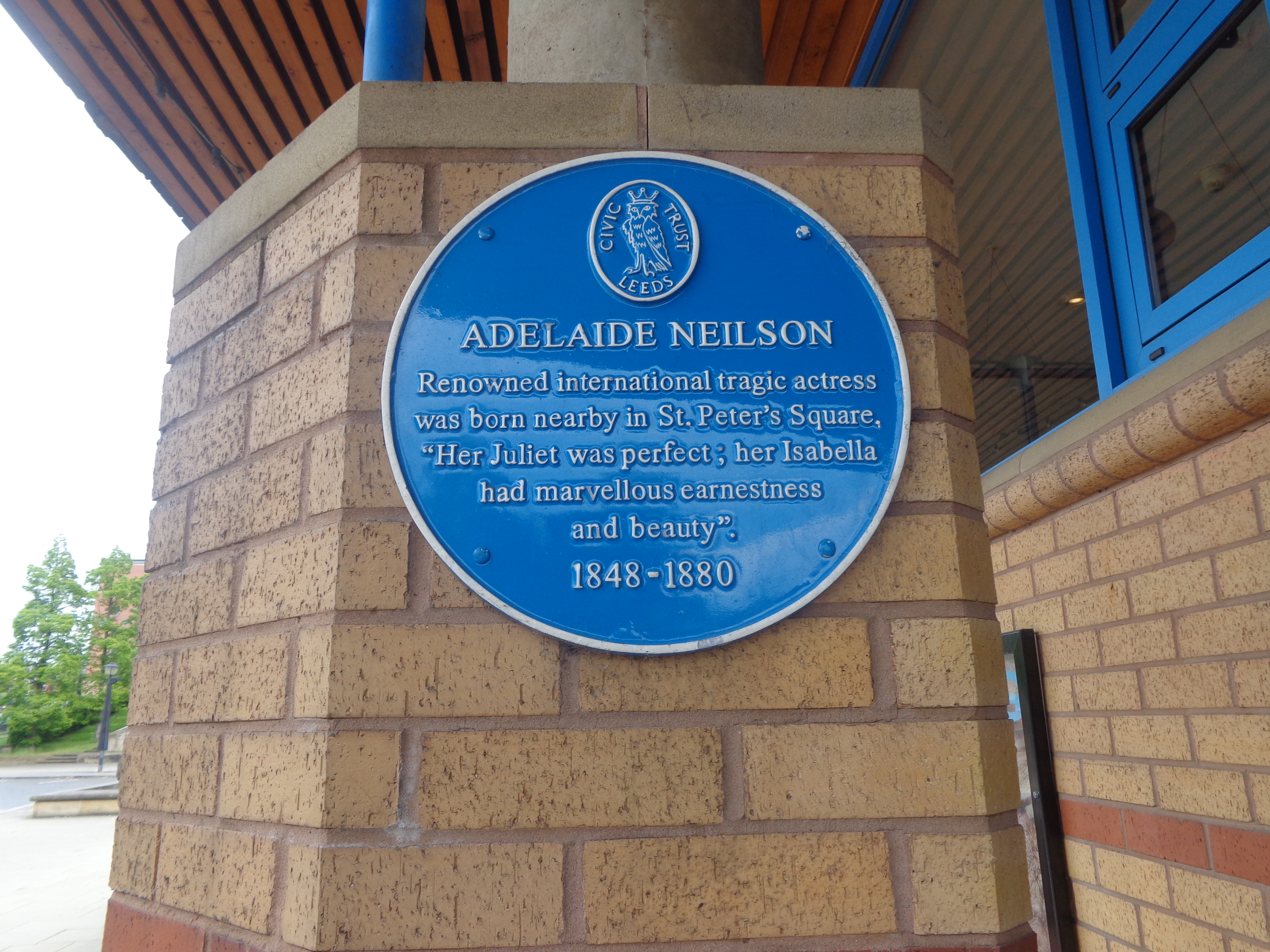
Adelaide Neilson blue plaque, Leeds Playhouse, Leeds (30th May 2014)
