= Elinor Remick Warren =

American composer, pianist

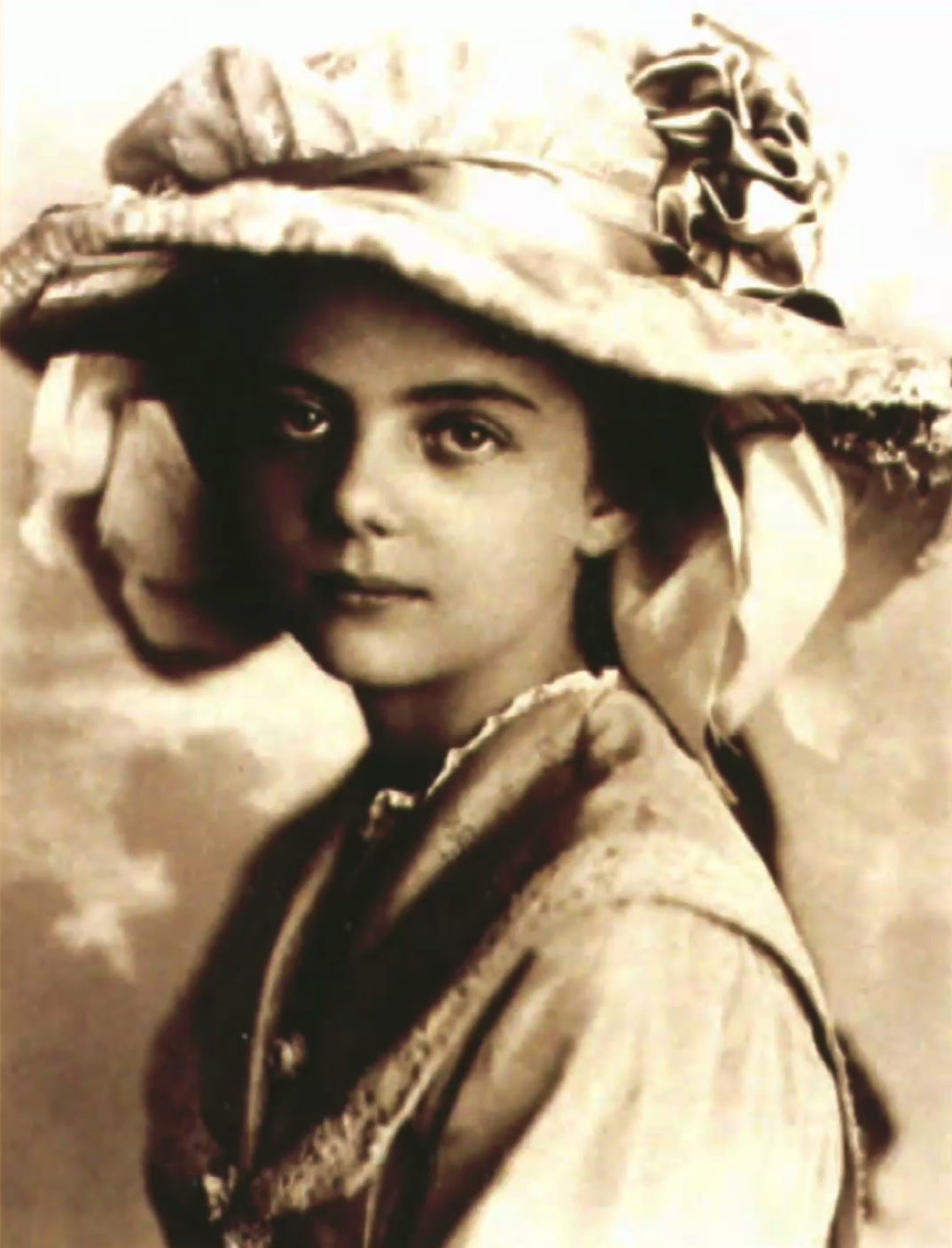
- Elinor Remick Warren in 1913
- Born: February 23, 1900; Los Angeles, California, United States
- Died: April 27, 1991 (aged 91)
- Musical career
- Occupations: Pianist, composer
- Instrument: Piano

Elinor Remick Warren (February 23, 1900, Los Angeles – April 27, 1991, Los Angeles) was an American composer of contemporary classical music and pianist.

== Early life and education ==
Her mother had been a student of a pupil of Franz Liszt, and introduced her daughter to art music. Warren's father was considered a fine amateur singer who had once considered singing professionally. Warren trained as a pianist with Kathryn Cocke through high school and took composition lessons from Gertrude Ross starting her second year in high school. She sent an early composition to the Schirmer music publishing company and received her first contract to publish with them before she graduated from high school.

Between high school and college, Warren studied piano with Harold Bauer and Leopold Godowsky. After attending Mills College for a year, she moved to New York, where she studied privately with composers Frank La Forge and Clarence Dickinson, both of whom were known for their art songs. Warren supported herself as an accompanist for singers and went on tour with contralto Margaret Matzenauer.

== Career ==
Warren composed in a predominantly neo-Romantic style. In demand as both a pianist and a composer, she was a soloist twice with the Los Angeles Philharmonic and made several recordings as a collaborator with various singers. In the 1930s, Warren began working on larger-scale compositions including her piece The Harp Weaver, a work for women's chorus, orchestra, and baritone soloist; and the symphonic The Passing of King Arthur (later re-titled The Legend of King Arthur). In 1940, with the success of King Arthur, she stopped performing to focus on composition. She actively composed on themes of nature, especially as seen in the American West, and mysticism. Warren spent most of her composition career in Los Angeles, which was considered an unusual choice at the time, given that New York was thought to be the center of new American music. Nonetheless, her works were widely performed during her lifetime. Remick Warren's intermission chimes, commissioned by Dorothy Chandler for the Los Angeles Music Center which opened in 1964, have been heard there ever since.

Her composition instructors included Olga Steeb, Paolo Gallico, Frank La Forge, Clarence Dickinson, and Nadia Boulanger. During her lifetime she wrote over 200 compositions. Many of these have been recorded by artists and ensembles such as the Roger Wagner Chorale, baritone Thomas Hampson, the Oslo Philharmonic, the Royal Scottish National Orchestra and the BBC Orchestra. Warren herself recorded a number of her piano and piano-vocal works. Her manuscripts and other materials are held by the Library of Congress in the Elinor Remick Warren Collection.

== Personal life ==
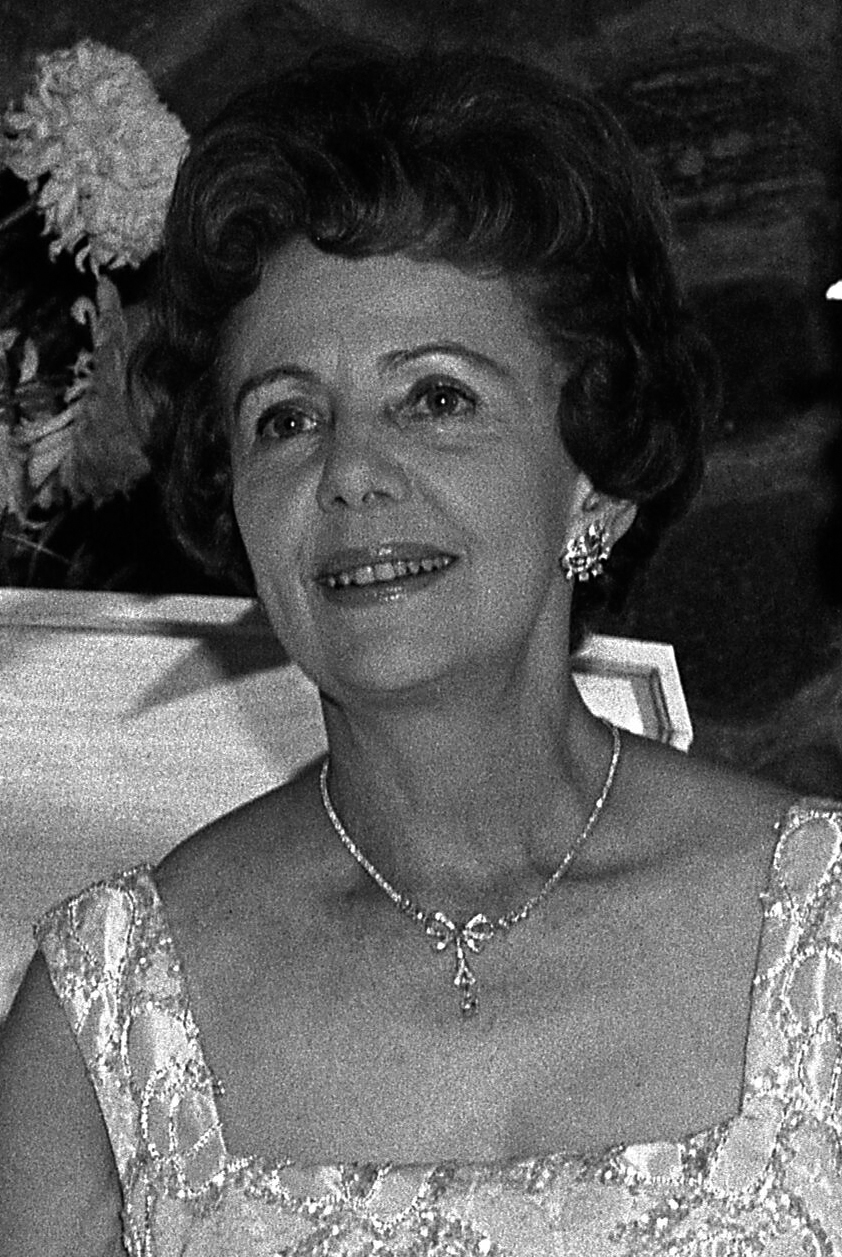
Warren in 1964

On June 17, 1925, she married Dr. Raymond Huntsberger in Los Angeles; they divorced four years later. In 1936 she married the film producer Z. Wayne Griffin (1907–1981), with whom she had two daughters and a son. She died at her home at the age of 91.

== Principal works ==
- The Fountain, symphonic sketch (orig. for piano, 1934; orch. 1939). 4'30
- The Legend of King Arthur, A Choral Symphony, for Baritone, Tenor, choir and orchestra (includes an orchestral Intermezzo) (1939–40; rev. 1974). 69'
- The Crystal Lake, symphonic poem (1946). 9'30
- Scherzo for orchestra (orig. for piano, 1937; orch. 1950). 3'
- Along the Western Shore, symphonic suite in three movements (orig. for piano, 1946–47; orch. 1954). 12'
- Suite for Orchestra in four movements (1954; rev. 1960). 21'
- Symphony in One Movement (1970). 18'

Much of Warren's output consists of large-scale choral and orchestral works.

== Bibliography ==
- Bortin, Virginia (1987). Elinor Remick Warren: Her Life and Her Music. Composers of North America, no. 5. Metuchen, New Jersey: Scarecrow Press.
- Bortin, Virginia (1993). Elinor Remick Warren: A Bio-Bibliography. Westport, CT: Greenwood Press.
- Elinor Remick Warren Society, http://www.elinorremickwarren.com/
