= Melvin J. Zahnow Library =

Coordinates: 43.51347°N 83.96096°W

The Melvin J. Zahnow Library is named for Melvin J. Zahnow and is part of Saginaw Valley State University, in the state of Michigan, United States.

== History ==
Named for one of the university's founders, the Melvin J. Zahnow Library opened its doors in the spring of 1987. Its 66,726 square feet (6,199.0 m^{2}) spans four floors, offering its users a comfortable and convenient place for research and study. Zahnow Library is one of the region's largest and most modern libraries. As of 2000, the library's collection totals more than 621,113 items and is increasing by nearly 20,000 each year. In addition to books, the library houses generous collections of periodicals and audio-visual materials, government documents, university archives and more than 370,000 microforms.

In 1997, the Library moved to a state-of-the art web based online catalog. "CardCat" can be accessed from the SVSU homepage or directly at . The catalog features keyword access, limit/sort capabilities and "hot links" within the database as well as to other web resources. The library homepage includes an Internet Launchpad, access to CardCat and the library main menu. September 18, 2003, marked the grand opening celebration of the library's addition/renovation and Roberta R. Allen Reading Room. The addition added 21,000 square feet (2,000 m^{2}) that provides more seating and study space for library users. Each floor also features new services that include the Library Instruction/Research Lab (1st Floor), the Student Technology Center (2nd Floor), the Library Cafe (3rd Floor) and the Roberta Allen Reading Room (4th Floor).

Zahnow Library offers its users a generous level of public service based on print, media, electronic and Internet resources and a 28,000-volume reference collection. The library's staff currently responds to more than 60,000 inquiries each year that range from basic reference questions to requests for complex instruction in the development and implementation of subject-specific search strategies. One of the library's prime goals is to provide support, assistance and instruction in the use of the university library's numerous print and automated reference resources, print and non-print collections, programs and services.

=== Melvin J. Zahnow ===
Melvin J. Zahnow was one of SVSU's original incorporators. A Frankenmuth resident, Mr. Zahnow was chairman and trustee of Wickes Corporation, and was a former chairman of the Harvey Randall Wickes Foundation. He began his business career as secretary and director of Wickes Brothers and Wickes Boiler Company in 1940. He also was a member of the SVSU Board of Control and the SVSU Foundation. Mr. Zahnow earned his Bachelor of Arts in business administration from Albion College in 1934.

The former Saginaw business and civic leader is remembered for his involvement in numerous clubs and organizations. In 1985, the Saginaw Chamber of Commerce honored him with its Community Service Award. Mr. Zahnow also was the recipient of the Lutheran Social Services Distinguished Service Award and is listed in Who's Who in the Midwest. In recognition of his contribution to SVSU, the university bestowed an Honorary Doctor of Laws degree upon Mr. Zahnow in 1982 and a distinguished Service Medallion in 1991.

== Types of media ==
The Melvin J. Zahnow Library collection contains a wide variety of materials in addition to the traditional periodicals and books. These materials include:

- Art prints
- Audio cassettes
- Compact discs
- Multi-media CDs-including Graduate Capstone projects by communication/Multimedia students
- Long-playing 33 1/3 rpm phonograph records
- Slides
- Video cassettes
- DVDs

== Catalogs and circulation ==
Media in the Zahnow Library, with the exception of slides and art prints, can be found on CARDCAT. Searches can be made by a number of methods, including by title, author and type of media.

General collection books and media items are circulated to faculty, staff, students and guests. Faculty, staff and students may check out up to 40 items from general collection. Faculty, staff and students may check out three items from other materials. Guests may check out up to 10 items from the general collection. All other items are in-house use for guests. For more information, see the Circulation/Media Services/Media Services page.

== Special services ==
There are three listening rooms available for students and faculty to use for reviewing materials. All rooms have a television/VCR available. Also available are CD players, DVD players and computers equipped for multi-media CDs. Students and faculty who want to use a listening room should ask at the Circulation/Media Services Desk for access.

The Student Technology Center is housed on the second floor of the Melvin J. Zahnow Library. For more information about STC, see its web page.

=== Disability services ===
Zahnow Library has a limited number of items available for student use. A TDD telephone is available at the Circulation/Media Services desk. A phonic ear is available at the Circulation/Media Services desk.

The Zahnow Library has motorized handicap scooters (Amigo) available for checkout by students. Students will need a library card to borrow the scooters. The checkout period is for an entire day. Scooters borrowed from the Library must be returned to the Library 15 minutes before closing. Disability Services also have additional items available for student use.
