= Eric R. Gilbertson =

American academic administrator

Eric R. Gilbertson was the third and longest-serving president of Saginaw Valley State University, in the U.S. state of Michigan. He succeeded Jack McBride Ryder as president of SVSU in August 1989, serving until his retirement in February 2014. He continued to teach courses in constitutional law and administrative science at SVSU after his retirement.

Gilbertson earned a Juris Doctor degree (with honors) from Cleveland State University. He holds a masters of arts in economics from Ohio University and a bachelor of science degree from Bluffton College (Ohio).

Prior to his arrival at Saginaw Valley State University, Gilbertson served as president of Johnson State College (Vermont), was legal counsel to the Ohio Board of Regents, and was executive assistant to the president of Ohio State University.

On August 18, 2014, the SVSU Board of Control voted to rename the Regional Education Center on campus after Gilbertson.
