= Edwin F. De Nyse =

American journalist and playwright

Edward Forrest De Nyse (c. 1841 – May 12, 1896), known colloquially as Ned De Nyse, was an American newspaper reporter, newspaper editor, poet, playwright, librettist, and theatrical producer.

== Early biography ==
De Nyse was born in Brooklyn approximately in 1841 to Denyse H. De Nyse and his wife Maria. He was from the "well-known New Utrecht family." He attended public school in New York City.

== In the newspaper industry ==
De Nyse's articles appeared as early as 1857, when the New York Dispatch published his fictional story "Paul Genot, The Miser."

In the early part of his career he was on the staff of the Evening Telegram and The New York Times .

Much of his career was spent with the New York Herald. In addition to being a reporter, he was employed "in a confidential capacity" by its founder, James Gordon Bennett, Sr.

He was a war correspondence for the New York Herald during the American Civil War. One of 200 Civil War correspondents for the New York Herald, De Nyse was accused of writing and publishing dispatches that aided the Confederate States Army. Under a military commission led by George H. Sharpe, colonel of the 120th New York Infantry, he was convicted and sentenced to six months' hard labor after which he would be banished from the Civil War front. But in his sentencing, Commander Joseph Hooker said "...it cannot be tolerated that newspapers correspondents should abuse the privilege of remaining with this army by the publication of intelligence certain to be of use to the enemy...Trusting that a milder punishment than that awarded by the Commission will be sufficient to serve as a warning to others of that class, the commanding General adopts the recommendation of the Commission and commutes the sentence to expulsion from the lines of this army."

Prior to this event, De Nyse's byline did not appear in his dispatches. By August 1863, his byline regularly appeared in dispatches beginning with the column "Interesting from Virginia." Accompanying the brigade led by Robert Sanford Foster, De Nyse wrote a series of dispatches detailing the war from the vantage point of being with the Union Army in Southern territory.

His serial story "Billy the Boxer" was announced in the Police Gazette of May 10, 1884.

He wrote poems that appeared on page 1 of the New York York Clipper and Theatrical Journal. Among his last poems might have been "The Veil of Tears" from 1885.

== Theatre activity ==
Writing in 1899, the Brooklyn Daily Eagle wrote that he was a "well known playwright of a generation ago" and had done favors for the Kiralfy family of impresarios.

De Nyse was the agent of Adelaide Neilson for her American tour beginning in 1872.

In 1877, the "Theatrical Notes" column of the National Republican (Washington, D.C.) reported on a prospect of a production of Anthony and Cleopatra at Niblo's Garden with Lulu Prior, with De Nyse "in the business department" (i.e. producer).

== Personal ==
De Nyse married actress Lulu Prior (stage name of Ann Louise Prior and daughter of the actress Mrs. J.J. Prior) on March 29, 1874.

== Death ==
As recounted by The New York Times, all was well with the De Nyse family until about 1885 when he was stricken with rheumatism and later developed cancer. From the onset of his illness he never left his home at 124 Ralph Avenue. His wife, Lulu, attended to him during this time.

De Nyse died May 12, 1896, at his home. The New York Herald listed the cause of death as "blood poisoning." As he had left his widow without money, the New York Times solicited funds for his burial. Several days later, the newspaper indicated that enough money had been raised for De Nyse's burial. He was buried on May 15, 1896, in Green-Wood Cemetery, lot 20779, section 148, grave 4. His widow, Lulu, died March 22, 1906, of heart disease. She was buried March 24, 1906, next to her husband.

== Stage works ==
Plays except where noted. This list, taken from advertisements and copyright registrations, is not verified as being complete, nor are all works known to have been produced.

- The Knave of Hearts (1858)
- Our Little Strategem (1859)
- A Social Evening (1859)
- The Demon of the Hearthstone (1860)
- Leonidas (1868), opera, music by Edwin B. Moore
- Cassie, or A Shadowed Life (1871)
- Waiting For The Mail (1871)
- Oofty Gooft (September 1871 at the Grand Opera House),
- Around The World in 80 Days (1875)
- Lightning Joe, The Telegraph Messenger (1880)
- Lola's Fortune (1883)
- The Pearl of Bagdad (1884) comic opera; music by John M. Loretz Jr.
- Sieba (translation) (Dec. 1882? 1884?)
