= Olga Steeb =

American pianist and music educator (1890–1941)

- Steeb in 1920
- Born: 1890; Los Angeles, California, U.S.
- Died: December 29, 1941 (aged 50–51)
- Occupations: Pianist; music educator
- Years active: 1910s
- Employers: University of Redlands; University of Southern California
- Spouses: Charles H. Keefer (m. 1911; div. 1916) Charles Edward Hubach (m. 1919, died)

Olga Steeb (1890 – December 29, 1941) was an American pianist and music educator based in Los Angeles.

== Early life ==
Olga Steeb was the daughter of Carl Egon Steeb and Sophie S. Steeb, both German immigrants living in Los Angeles. Her father, a French horn player, was said to have taught his daughter to memorize hundreds of compositions as a child, and she was performing in concerts by 1904. She studied piano with Thilo Becker.

== Career ==
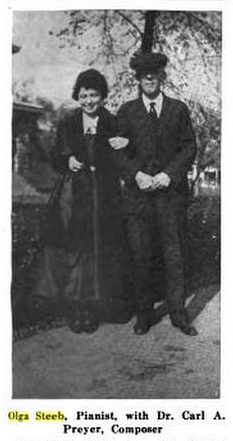
Steeb with composer Carl Preyer, from a 1921 publication

Steeb performed across the United States and in Europe, in solo performances and as part of the Griffes Group with mezzo-soprano Edna Thomas and violinist Sacha Jacobinoff. She was featured as a soloist at the Panama–Pacific International Exposition in 1915, in San Francisco. She made her New York debut in 1919, at Aeolian Hall. Once, in 1921, she was called from the audience to the stage to perform a concerto with the Los Angeles Philharmonic, without rehearsal or advanced notice, when the scheduled pianist, Mischa Levitzki, was injured. She performed at the Hollywood Bowl in 1922. In 1923, she played a radio concerts with retired violinist Lili Petschnikoff.

Steeb was head of the music departments at the University of Redlands from 1915 to 1919 and at the University of Southern California from 1919 to 1923. The Olga Steeb Piano School operated on Wilshire Boulevard from 1923 to 1942. Steeb's piano students included Leonard Pennario, composer Elinor Remick Warren, composer Harry Partch, and organist David Craighead.

Her sisters, Norma Steeb and Lillian Steeb French, continued running the piano school awhile past Olga's death.

== Personal life ==
Olga Steeb married twice. Her first husband was fellow musician Charles H. Keefer; they married in 1911 and divorced in 1916. She married again in 1919, to Charles Edward Hubach, a vocal teacher who became her manager. Steeb was a widow when she died in Los Angeles in late 1941, from cancer, around age 55.
