= Morris Beitman =

Morris N. Beitman
- Born: December 1911; Cook County, Illinois
- Died: February 1980 (aged 68); Highland Park, Lake County, Illinois
- Occupations: Author, Radio Electronics Instructor and Publisher of Supreme Publications, Chicago IL
- Known for: Publishing yearly volumes of "Most Often Needed" radio and television servicing information

Morris N. Beitman was born in December 1911 in Cook County, Illinois. Started as an engineer with the US Army Signal Corps, he used his experience and abilities to form two career paths. He became a teacher in the Chicago public schools high school system as a radio instructor. Soon after he got into technical publishing as Supreme Publications. As publisher his goal was to support the radio and television servicing industry with easy to understand reference materials. He was married to Rose Rissman.

== Early years ==
Morris Beitman received his BS in mathematics at Illinois Institute of Technology and later served in the military as an engineer with the US Army Signal Corps. He later became an associate member with the Institute of Radio Engineers (now called Institute of Electrical and Electronics Engineers or IEEE). His known pre- and post-military career was a teacher in the Chicago public high schools as radio instructor.

== The founding of Supreme Publications ==
By the mid-1930s the growth in ownership of radio receivers in the United States spun off other business opportunities. One of them was the repair of radio and radio-phonograph sets and eventually, television. Hugo Gernsback was an early publisher of repair manuals. Soon others were publishing. John F. Rider in the early 1930s began to compile complete volumes of radio servicing diagrams of many radio manufacturers called the Perpetual Troubleshooter's Manual. In time these servicing manuals became quite large and contained information on radios that were not common or were produced in small quantities. Although Rider's Perpetual Troubleshooter's Manual became a standard reference during the 1930s, the size and bulk of these yearly volumes could become a hindrance. Rider manuals contained information on common and rare models. Service businesses were paying extra for brands they rarely or never encountered. This "opened the door" for an alternative path and Morris Beitman was able to exploit this business opportunity.

In 1940-1941 Morris N. Beitman under the name Supreme Publications (located at 328 S. Jefferson St. in Chicago) produced a series of books called, "Most-Often-Needed Radio Diagrams and Servicing Information" and later "Most-Often-Needed Television Servicing Information" for successive years. These books offered radio and television repair businesses a condensed version of Rider's "Perpetual Troubleshooter's Manual", by only providing models that were common or made in large quantities. The radio series started with 1926-1938 models in one volume. Each year after that represented a new volume until 1969 when the last volume was published. The television series started in 1946 and continued into the early 1970s. Their last known location was 1760 Balsam Road, Highland Park, Illinois.

From 1940 to 1960 Supreme published other volume sets for record players, tape recorders, wire recorders and other specialized consumer electronics using the "most often needed" title. These references like radios and televisions were in yearly bound sets but were not consistent year-to-year sets. These volumes never reached the quantity, consistency or longevity of the radio or television titles.

== Other publications ==
Beitman under the Supreme Publication name was author to a number of other publications devoted to radio and television. Dates given are the earliest known date of first publication.

1. Practical Radio Mathematics (1941)
2. Radio Servicing Course in Twenty-two Lessons (1941)
3. Simplified Radio Servicing by Comparison Method (1945)
4. Advanced Radio Servicing - Methods and Ideas
5. How to Use Radio Diagrams in Radio Servicing (1947)
6. Practical Radio for War Training (1943)
7. Manual of Radio Servicing - Ideas that Clicked
8. How to Modernize Radios for Profit (1950)
9. Most Often Needed Service Notes for Record Players, Automatic Chargers, and Wireless Recorders (various years after 1945)
10. Cyclopedia of Television Facts (1941)
11. The Inside Story of Stethoscope Servicing
12. Television Servicing Course (1966)
13. Refrigeration Text Book for Home Study (1944)
14. Practical Radio Electronics Course (1946)

== Later years and the end of Supreme Publications ==
Little can be found on Morris N. Beitman's career activities and Supreme Publications. It is also possible that Supreme Publications was a side business for Morris Beitman since he was also a radio instructor in the Chicago high schools. In the 1950s, like John F. Rider, Beitman had to revise many of his publications due to rapid changes in technology used in consumer electronics. In the 1960s his son Hartford assisted him in Supreme Publications by continuing the yearly service volumes for radio and television. Many of Morris Beitman's publications either had no copyright or they had expired. Hartford spent time to straighten these matters and compiled the "1967-1969 Most Often Needed Radio Diagram and Servicing Information" book. Supreme would stop publishing by the early 1970s. One reason was the declining need for repairing consumer electronics due to the increased reliability and the low cost of electronics (cost less to buy one than repair it). He died in February 1980, in Highland Park, Illinois.

== The rise in interest of Supreme's "Most Often Needed Series" ==
Radio and television servicing is no longer a significant business segment in small or independent business. The rise in interest is in preserving old consumer technology. Interest in Morris Beitman's "Most Often Needed Radio Diagrams" resurfaced in the early 1980s with the rise of restoring antique and collectible radios made before the 1940s. Vintage Radio, founded by Morgan E. McMahon, was a publishing company specializing in preserving early radio and television technology. They reprinted "Most Often Needed 1926-1938 Radio Diagrams and Servicing Information" and sold it to radio collectors.

From 1986 to 1989, Hartford Beitman and Kristina Hund Beitman made an effort to resurrect the "Most Often Needed" series by compiling past servicing information from 1926 to 1950 based on brand name. This series of books was published by A R S Enterprises. No more new copies are available and A R S Enterprises publishing current status has not been found. Hartford Beitman's other books are Recorded Sound (1981), Seattle Seating (1984), Aggressive Investment Marketing (1985), Radio Hobbyist Handbook (1988) and Financial Services Marketing (1990).

Supreme's "Most Often Needed" series have become public domain. There are groups interested in technology preservation. These groups, through scanning or digitizing the thousands of pages of the series, have made them available online for non-commercial use. Radio collecting and restoration books suggest using Supreme's "Most-Often-Needed" volumes as a starting source to find information. Preserving old technology is often called "dead technology", in other words technology that is no longer advancing or used in mass production.

The American Radio History website offers the complete set of Supreme Publications "Most Often Need Radio Servicing Information" and "Most Often Needed Television Servicing Information" to be viewed online. Selecting a title and year allows one to scan through the entire manual.
