= Joe Miller (commentator) =

British esports commentator

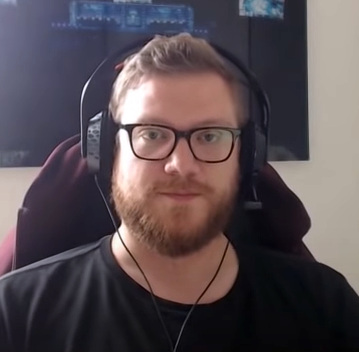
- Joe Miller in 2018
- Born: Rotherham, England
- Occupation: Commentator

Joe Miller or JOEE (born 29 July 1987 in Rotherham, England) is a British commentator. He started his career as an esports caster at gaming tournaments, working his first event shoutcasting Battlefield 1942 (short: BF1942). The 3D World War II first-person shooter (FPS) video game was coincidentally also the first game Miller played at a competitive level. At age sixteen, he began to commentate BF1942 games at home in the UK, pushing out as many audio commentaries as he could. In an interview with JP McDaniel (host of Real Talk on YouTube), Miller revealed that it was a "big jump" from the audio commentaries he initially produced to the audio-video commentaries we are accustomed to today.

Miller's big break came when he joined TsN, through which he cast the Cyberathlete Professional League (CPL) World Tour in 2005, arguably the "most definitive moment" of his early esports career. From there he went on to work as a broadcaster for numerous professional video game leagues including the World Series of Video Games (WSVG), Championship Gaming Series, DreamHack and various Electronic Sports League (ESL) events. In amongst these achievements he worked as General Manager for Fnatic back when they were based in Southampton as well as joining the QuadV team, headed by fellow casters Leigh "Deman" Smith and Paul “ReDeYe” Chaloner.

Although Miller is known for casting competitive Counter-Strike and Quake Live tournaments, he has also made a name for himself in League of Legends (LoL). Miller moved to Cologne, Germany and began working for the ESL in 2008 with Matt Rider and James Harding. He secured a regular spot casting weekly League of Legends Championship Series, which he did alongside the likes of Leigh "Deman" Smith, Trevor “Qu1ksh0t” Henry, Jason Kaplan, Martin "Deficio" Lynge and Eefje “sjokz” Depoortere. Miller currently resides in Cologne, Germany and speaks fluent German.

Notable achievements include casting the Riot League of Legends tournaments at Gamescom 2013 and securing a casting position at LoL World Championships hosted in Los Angeles.

On 3 December 2014 Miller announced he would be leaving the EU LCS production.
