= Thomas Darbyshire =

English priest

Thomas Darbyshire (1518–1604) was an English churchman and Jesuit.

He was a nephew of Edmund Bonner by a sister. He received his education at Broadgates Hall, Oxford, where he graduated B.A. in 1544, B.C.L. in 1553, and D.C.L. on 20 July 1556. His uncle collated him to the prebend of Totenhall in St Paul's Cathedral on 23 July 1543, to the rectory of Hackney on 26 May 1554, to the rectory of Fulham on 1 October 1558, to the archdeaconry of Essex on 22 October 1558, and to the rectory of St. Magnus, near London Bridge, on 27 November 1558. He was also chancellor of the diocese of London, in which capacity he examined Protestants who were brought before Bishop Bonner about matters of faith.

On the accession of Elizabeth I, he was a conspicuous Catholic, and was deprived of all his preferments. He remained in England, however, for some time, and was deputed to attend the Council of Trent. He was sent in order to procure an opinion on the point, then controversial, whether the Catholic faithful might frequent the Protestant churches in order to avoid the penalties decreed against recusants. He brought back an answer to the effect that attendance at the heretical worship would be a great sin. It was at his prompting that the fathers of the Council passed the decree De non adeundis Haereticorum ecclesiis. He afterwards suffered imprisonment in London, and eventually left England.

He visited several parts of France and Flanders, and entered the Society of Jesus on 1 May 1563, at St. Andrew's Novitiate, Rome. He was sent first to Monaco and then to the University of Dillingen. Then the pope gave him a mission to Scotland, along with Father Edmund Hay, to the apostolic nuncio Vincentius Laurens who had been consecrated bishop, and appointed his successor in the see of Monte Regale. The object of this mission is unclear but probably connected with affairs of Mary, Queen of Scots. Subsequently, he was ordered to France, having been appointed master of novices at Billom. He became a professed father of the Society of Jesus in 1572. For some years he lectured in Latin to the members of the Sodality of the Blessed Virgin. This was probably at Paris, where he was residing in 1575–6, and again in 1579 and in 1583. While in Paris, he was an important early influence on Robert Southwell. Among his converts were Henry Fitzsimon and George Gilbert.

He visited William Allen in the English college at Rheims, who thought highly of him. He retired to Pont-à-Mousson in Lorraine, where he died on 6 April 1604. Some of his letters, intercepted by the English government, were printed by Henry Foley.
