= Lili Petschnikoff =

American violinist (1874–1957)

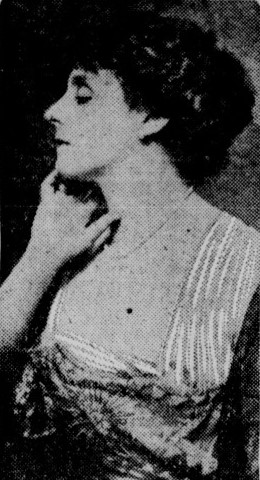
Lili Petschnikoff, c. 1919

Lili Petschnikoff (December 1, 1874 — September 23, 1957) was an American concert violinist.

== Early life ==
Lili Schober was born in Chicago, Illinois, but spent much of her youth abroad, studying violin under Joseph Joachim in Berlin and performing in Europe.

== Career ==
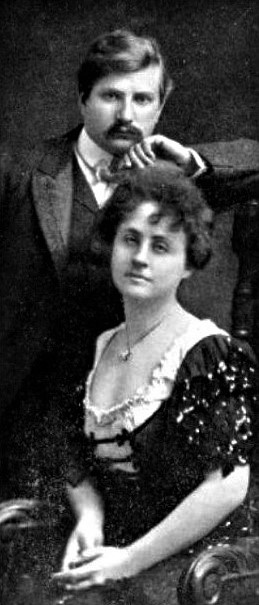
Alexander and Lili Petschnikoff, c. 1907

Lili Petschnikoff and her husband toured together as musicians in the United States in 1907. Petchnikoff gave a recital at the Aeolian Hall in 1916, with singer Clara Gabrilowitsch and pianist Rudolph Ganz. In 1919 Lili Petschnikoff gave a series of concerts at her home in Hollywood with pianist Cornelia Rider-Possart. She was officially retired by 1923, but played a radio concert with pianist Olga Steeb that year. She became a chamber music partner to Albert Einstein, who enjoyed playing violin with Petchnikoff in 1931, while he was working at the California Institute of Technology. She was also a friend to German singer Lotte Lehmann.

She was said to own a Stradivarius violin, probably one of the two that her husband brought to the United States on his 1899 visit. Petschnikoff wrote an autobiography, The World At Our Feet, published posthumously by her son in 1968.

== Personal life ==
Lili Schober married Russian violinist Alexander Petschnikoff. They had three children, Tatjana, Nadja, and Sergei, before they got divorced. She reclaimed her American citizenship and eventually moved to Los Angeles during World War I, and her home opposite the entrance to the Hollywood Bowl was a gathering place of musicians and arts patrons. She died in 1957, in Los Angeles, aged 82 years.
