= Saginaw Valley State University =

Public university in University Center, Michigan, US

- Former names: Saginaw Valley College (1963–1974); Saginaw Valley State College (1974–1987)
- Motto: It's a Great Day to be a Cardinal!
- Type: Public university
- Established: November 13, 1963; 62 years ago
- Academic affiliations: Space-grant
- Endowment: $120.4 million (2025)
- President: George Grant Jr.
- Provost: Lisa Krissoff Boehm
- Students: 6,406
- Undergraduates: 5,628
- Postgraduates: 563
- Location: University Center, Michigan, U.S. 43.5141°N 83.96156°W
- Campus: Suburban/rural
- Colors: Blue and red
- Nickname: Cardinals
- Sporting affiliations: NCAA Division II – GLIAC (North Division)
- Website: www.svsu.edu

Saginaw Valley State University (SVSU) is a public university in University Center, Michigan, United States. It was founded in 1963 as Saginaw Valley College and is the newest public university in Michigan. Its 748-acre (303 ha) campus is in Kochville Township, approximately 5.5 miles (8.9 km) north of downtown Saginaw, Michigan. SVSU offers over 100 academic programs at the undergraduate and graduate levels in its five colleges, with approximately 8,500 students at its main campus in University Center.

== History ==
Higher education in the Saginaw Valley region dates back to the founding of Bay City Junior College in 1922. Though the junior college was replaced by Delta College in 1961, the area still lacked a four-year baccalaureate institution. Saginaw Valley College was founded as a private institution in November 1963, and became a state-supported institution in 1965. The name changed to Saginaw Valley State College in 1974 and again to Saginaw Valley State University in 1987.

In 1955, civic leaders in the Saginaw Valley region met to discuss prospects for a local institution of higher education. The next year, a committee of 300 recommended a two-year community college which would expand to a four-year college. The two-year college, Delta, was approved by voters in 1958 and opened in 1961.

=== Saginaw Valley College ===
Articles of incorporation for what would become Saginaw Valley College (originally called Delta Senior University) were drawn up in 1963, and the state granted a charter to SVC as a private, four-year liberal arts institution. Samuel D. Marble, the president of Delta College, was appointed president of SVC in 1964. After holding both presidencies for four months, he resigned from Delta. The first class of 119 students completed two years at Delta and transferred to SVC. The first commencement ceremony was held in 1966 at a Midland church for a graduating class of ten. A site for a permanent SVC campus (the college was operating out of Delta's basement) was chosen in Kochville Township in 1966 and classes were moved to a building on that site the next year. Ground was broken for what would become Wickes Hall in the late summer. Saginaw Valley College received full accreditation by the North Central Association in April 1970. The college's athletic teams were named the Redbirds, shortly thereafter changed to Cardinals after two coaches spotted a kitchen decoration with a cardinal on it at a golf tournament in Kentucky. In 1972, the Cardinals became a charter member of the Great Lakes Intercollegiate Athletic Conference, and in 1974 Frank "Muddy" Waters was hired as the college's first football coach.

=== Saginaw Valley State College ===
The name changed to Saginaw Valley State College in 1974. That same year, Samuel D. Marble, the college's president who had also served in that role at Delta College, submitted his resignation. Marble had also served as president of Wilmington College (Ohio) in Ohio. He would be named president emeritus and is honored with a lecture hall named in his honor in Wickes Hall. In November 1974, Jack M. Ryder became president of the college. A report by the Michigan Efficiency Task Force in 1977 recommended to then-Governor William G. Milliken that SVSC and Delta could be run more efficiently if they were combined, an idea which gained no traction. In 1980 the Higher Learning Commission/North Central Association continued this accreditation and granted accreditation at the master's degree level. Both accreditations have been retained continuously since the original accreditation. Also in 1980, two Japanese students attended SVSC for two weeks, beginning what is now a flourishing international student enrollment. A fire in 1985 destroyed financial records, registration files, and other important records. The college became home to the works of the noted sculptor Marshall M. Fredericks in June 1987.

=== Saginaw Valley State University ===
On November 5, 1987, SVSC became Saginaw Valley State University. Jack Ryder resigned as president in 1989 and Eric R. Gilbertson succeeded him. An off-campus location was opened in Cass City in 1991. In 2000, George W. Bush visited the Ryder Center days before the election where he would be elected President of the United States. The annual Battle of the Valleys, a fundraising competition against rival Grand Valley State University, was established in 2003. In 2009, SVSU alumnus Tony Ceccacci was the lead flight director for STS-125, a mission to repair the Hubble Space Telescope, and an SVSU pennant was sent to space on board the Space Shuttle Atlantis. The pennant is currently on display in Pioneer Hall. On June 18, 2013, President Gilbertson announced his intention to retire when the university's board of control finds his replacement.

Ming Chuan University, the first Asian university to be accredited in the United States, opened their Michigan Campus in Gilbertson Hall in 2014.

In 2015, SVSU applied to the Carnegie Foundation for the Advancement of Teaching to receive a Community Engagement Classification. To be selected, institutions provide descriptions and examples of institutionalized practices of community engagement that showed alignment among mission, culture, leadership, resources and practices. The designation is in effect for 10 years.

=== Presidents ===
Samuel Davey Marble served as president of SVC from March 23, 1964, to January 14, 1974. He had been the first president of Delta College, from 1958 to 1964. The lecture hall in Wickes Hall was named in his honor, the Gladys and Samuel Marble Graduate Business Scholarship Fund was established in 1997, and the Samuel Marble Memorial Scholarship was established in 1990 to be awarded to a transfer student from Delta.

Jack McBride Ryder served as president of SVSC/SVSU from November 1, 1974, to June 30, 1989. He initiated the successful construction of Brown Hall, the Zahnow Library, the science building, and the Ryder Center. He was also instrumental in raising private gifts for the construction of Pioneer Hall, the Arbury Fine Arts Center, the Marshall M. Fredericks Sculpture Museum, and Wickes Stadium. Due to his leadership, SVSC, Grand Valley State College, Ferris State College, and Lake Superior State College were all elevated to universities by legislation signed on November 4, 1987. Ryder was named a president emeritus of the University on December 13, 1991.

Eric R. Gilbertson was inaugurated as president of SVSU on August 29, 1989, and served as the longest-tenured in SVSU's history. During his tenure, the university's endowment has increased twenty-fold and the campus physical plant has tripled in size. Enrollment nearly doubled during his tenure. Gilbertson is a former president of Johnson State College in Vermont and was the executive assistant to the president of Ohio State University as well as legal counsel to the Ohio Board of Regents. Gilbertson announced his intention to retire in 2013 upon the appointment of his successor.

On February 10, 2014, Donald Bachand, the university's provost and academic vice president, was named SVSU's fourth president. He officially took office February 17 and was formally installed June 22.

George Grant Jr. began serving as the fifth president of Saginaw Valley State University on January 1, 2023. He joined SVSU after previously serving as chancellor of Penn State Berks. Prior to that, Grant spent 24 years at Grand Valley State University in Michigan, including 12 years as dean of the College of Community and Public Service.

== Academics ==
=== Undergraduate admissions ===
Fall First-Time Freshman Statistics
	2021	2020	2019	2018	2017	2016
Applicants	5,878	6,881	7,149	7,329	6,457	6,700
Admits	4,577	6,156	5,227	5,672	4,768	5,083
Admit rate	77.9	89.5	73.1	77.4	73.8	75.9
Enrolled	1,336	1,382	1,470	1,577	1,231	1,353
Yield rate	29.2	22.4	28.1	27.8	25.8	26.6
ACT composite* (out of 36)	18.5-25	19-25	19-25	19-26	20-25	20-25
SAT composite* (out of 1600)	970-1160	970-1180	980-1180	990-1200	990-1190	—
* middle 50% range

Saginaw Valley State University is considered "selective" by U.S. News & World Report. For the Class of 2025 (enrolling Fall 2021), SVSU received 5,878 applications and accepted 4,577 (77.9%), with 1,336 enrolling. The middle 50% range of SAT scores for enrolling freshmen was 970-1160. The middle 50% ACT composite score range was 18.5-25.

=== Academic Colleges ===
The College of Arts and Behavioral Sciences is the oldest of the university's five colleges.

The The Scott L. Carmona College of Business is named after Scott L. Carmona, a 1981 alumnus and owner of Sunrise National Distributors Inc., a distributor of automotive afterparts in Bay City, the college recently added a 38,500 sq. ft. expansion that opened in 2020.

The College of Education offers teacher education programs, advanced educator learning programs as well as certification renewal and endorsements.

The Crystal M. Lange College of Health and Human Services is named for the founder of the College of Nursing who served as its dean for 20 years.

The College of Science, Engineering and Technology offers academic programs in the science, engineering, and technology disciplines.

Saginaw Valley's most popular undergraduate majors, by 2021 graduates, were:

Registered Nursing/Registered Nurse (165)
Social Work (88)
Business Administration and Management (81)
Elementary Education and Teaching (69)
Criminal Justice/Safety Studies (65)
Rehabilitation Science (57)

=== Accreditations ===
Saginaw Valley State University was accredited by the Higher Learning Commission of the North Central Association as a baccalaureate degree granting institution in 1970. In 1980 the HLC/NCA continued this accreditation and granted accreditation at the master's degree level. Both accreditations have been retained continuously since the original accreditation. SVSU also has ten programs that have been awarded specialized accreditations.

The Scott L. Carmona College of Business is accredited by the Association to Advance Collegiate Schools of Business (AACSB).

== Campus ==
=== Academic Buildings ===
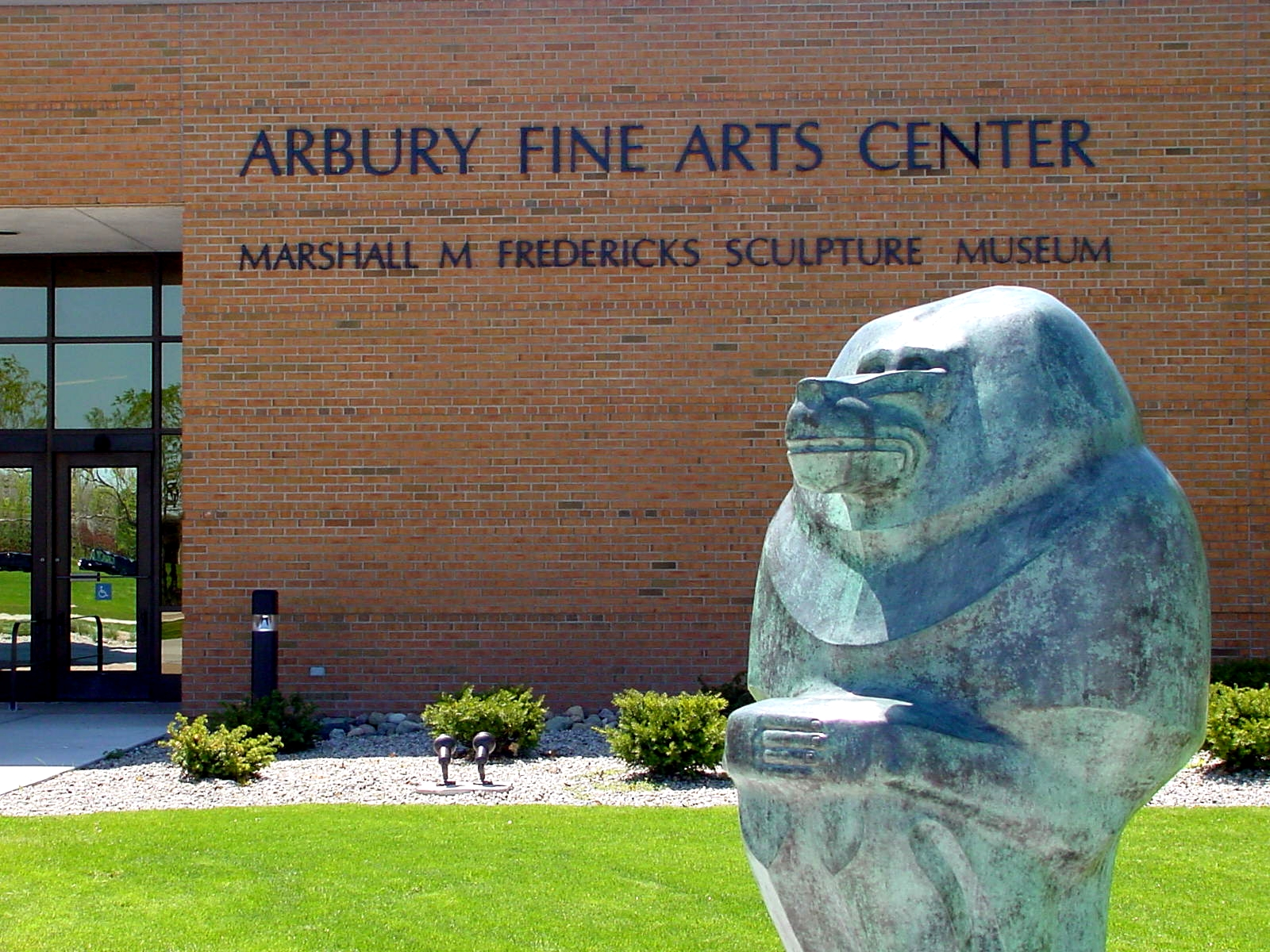
Marshall Fredericks Sculpture Museum in front of the Arbury Fine Arts Center

Wickes Hall is named for Harvey Randall Wickes, and is the main administrative center on campus.

Brown Hall is named for Maurice E. Brown. It houses faculty offices and classrooms.

The Melvin J. Zahnow Library houses over 200,000 print volumes and over 400,000 non-print items.

The Arbury Fine Arts Center is named for Ned and Dorothy Arbury. It houses classrooms and other facilities for the fine arts, including the Marshall M. Fredericks Sculpture Museum.

The Herbert Dow Doan Science Building is named for Herbert Dow Doan, and houses classrooms, faculty offices, teaching labs, research labs, and a Starbucks.

Curtiss Hall is named for Charles B. Curtiss, a long-time member of the Board of Control. Groening Commons, the large atrium inside Curtiss Hall, is named for William A. Groening. Curtiss Hall houses the Malcolm Field Theater for Performing Arts and Rhea Miller Recital Hall as well as the Scott L. Carmona College of Business.

Pioneer Hall, the home of the College of Science, Engineering and Technology, was completed in 1978 and underwent a large renovation in 2009. It is "certified green" by the U.S. Green Building Council, the first building in mid-Michigan to be so recognized.

Gilbertson Hall is home to the College of Education and other classes and departments, including the James A. Barcia Center for Public Policy and Service. Originally named the Regional Education Center, the building was named for the university's third president in 2014.

Bachand Hall is home to the Crystal M. Lange College of Health and Human Services. The building incorporates the largest aqua-thermal heating/cooling system in the state of Michigan to reduce energy costs by over 35%.

The Doan Center houses the Marketplace at Doan (the main dining hall) and the Student Center, which houses several student-related activities. It is named for Leland I. Doan.

The Ryder Center for Health & Physical Education is the main athletic building on campus and also houses classrooms. It is named for former SVSU President Jack McBride Ryder.

The Art Studio was originally built as a Theatre, and fulfilled that function until the construction of Curtiss Hall. After a brief stint as engineering labs during the reconstruction of Pioneer Hall, it now functions as two large studio spaces for art classes.

=== Other Buildings ===
South Campus Complex A-C house business services for the university. Building A was constructed in 1985 to house administration following a fire in Wickes Hall. Buildings B and C are the two oldest structures on campus, dating back to 1966 and 1968, respectively.

Founders Hall was constructed in 1995 as a nondenominational chapel for the campus community.

The Covenant MedExpress is a $2.6 million clinic open to SVSU students and the public. It is part of a partnership with Covenant Healthcare and has X-ray and lab facilities.

=== Residence Halls ===
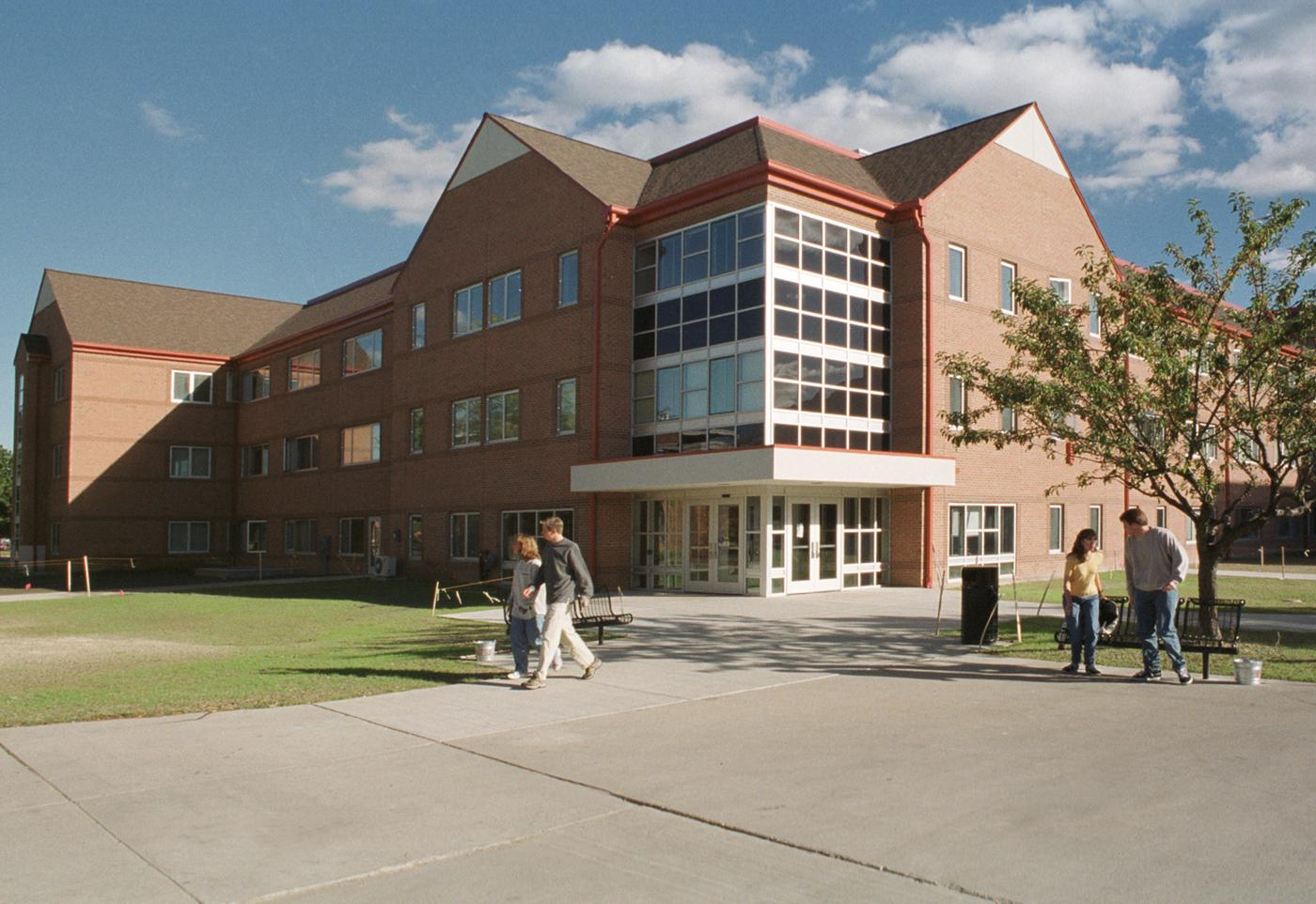
Saginaw Valley State University's MJ Brandimore House.

(In order of construction)

- First year suites A-E
- First year suites F and G
- Pine Grove Village
- MJ Brandimore House (formerly known as Living Center North)
- Living Center South
- University Village
- Living Center Southwest
- Cardinal Corners

== Administration ==
The governing authority of the university is the SVSU Board of Control, established by the Michigan Constitution and by statute consisting of eight members appointed by the Governor of Michigan for eight-year terms. The university is considered a political subdivision of the state government and, thus, is exempt from federal income tax.

== Athletics ==
The Saginaw Valley State University fields 18 varsity teams at the NCAA Division II level as members of the Great Lakes Intercollegiate Athletic Conference (GLIAC). The Cardinals compete in the following sports:

Men's

- Baseball
- Basketball
- Cross country
- Football
- Golf
- Soccer
- Track and field
- Swimming and Diving

Women's

- Basketball
- Cross country
- Soccer
- Softball
- Swimming and Diving
- Tennis
- Track and field
- Volleyball
- Golf
- Lacrosse

The Junior Varsity football program dates to 1974; Varsity football started in 1975, as did the marching band. The school song is "Cardinal Fight", written by Thomas Root.

The Men's Ice Hockey team won consecutive national championships in 2009 and 2010.

== Student newspaper ==
The Valley Vanguard is the official campus newspaper. It has been running since 1967

== Cultural exchange ==
The university has a sister-college exchange relationship with Shikoku University in Tokushima, Japan.

== Notable alumni ==
- James A. Barcia, congressman, state representative, and state senator
- Matt Black, professional football player
- Rob Callaway, professional football player
- Meera Chopra, South Indian film actress
- John DiGiorgio, professional football player
- Nicole Franzel, reality television star
- David R. Gilmour, United States Ambassador to Equatorial Guinea
- Gail Goestenkors, college basketball coach
- Sue Guevara, college basketball coach
- Jeff Heath, professional football player
- Todd Herremans, professional football player
- Khalid bin Ali Al Humaidan, Saudi General Intelligence Directorate Director
- Jeff Janis, professional football player
- Jonathon Jennings, professional football player
- Lamar King, professional football player
- Matt Koleszar, state representative
- Matt LaFleur, professional football coach
- Dej Loaf, rapper, singer
- Ruvell Martin, professional football player
- Glenn Martinez, professional football player
- Eugene Marve, professional football player
- Suzy Merchant, college basketball coach
- Bill O'Neill, professional ten-pin bowler
- Jennifer Schomaker, chemist
- Paul Spicer, professional football player
- Bart Stupak, congressman
- Cale Wassermann, college soccer coach
