= Matt Rider =

British esports commentator

Zalmah

Personal information
- Name: Matt Rider
- Nationality: British

Career information
- Games: World of Warcraft

Matt Rider (born 1988), also known by the pseudonym Zalmah, is a British former professional electronic sports player and commentator.

Rider became European Champion of World of Warcraft at Blizzcon 2007 with 'Per 'Lykke' Nielsen'. He was signed by Championship Gaming Series (CGS) when DirecTV planned to broadcast World of Warcraft to a mainstream television audience. He placed second at the 2v2 World Finals at Sony Studios, Los Angeles and qualified for 5v5 European finals in Hamburg.

In 2008 he relocated to Cologne, Germany to work for Electronic Sports League as host and editor with James "2GD" Harding and Joe Miller (commentator). Broadcasting the Intel Extreme Masters, he provided commentary for World of Warcraft and Counter-Strike 1.6 tournaments, presenting live at CeBit and Gamescom.

In 2009 he produced the weekly internet World of Warcraft show WoW Wednesdays which attracted a regular viewership before the emergence of streaming platforms like Twitch.

In 2011 over 1.5 million unique viewers watched him present the esports finals live at DreamHack, the world's largest digital festival and LAN party.

In 2018 Rider founded Play Context, an independent publishing label for entertainment.
