= John Rider (bishop) =

Irish bishop and lexicographer (1562–1632)

John Ryder (1562 – 1632) was a lexicographer who published an English-Latin Dictionary that was widely used in the 17th century. A favourite of Elizabeth I, he was Dean of St. Patrick's Cathedral, Dublin, and the Anglican Bishop of Killaloe.

== Birth ==
John Ryder was born in 1562, the son of Edward de Rythre of Carrington, Cheshire. His great-grandfather, Thomas de Rythre (d.1552) of Scarcroft, was Cofferer to the Household of King Edward VI and a first cousin of Henry Percy, 6th Earl of Northumberland, through their grandfather Sir William de Rythre (1408–1476) of Ryther Castle, Scarcroft and Harewood Castle. Bishop Ryder was the first of his family to spell his name Ryder, rather than de Rythre/Ryther. His first cousin, Mary Ryther (daughter of the Lord Mayor of London) and her husband Sir Thomas Lake were the great-grandparents of the Duchess of Chandos.

== Career in the Church ==
Ryder was educated at Jesus College, Oxford (B.A, M.A.). Afterwards he was Rector of Bermondsey (1581–1583) and of South Ockendon (1583–1590). At Oxford, 1589, he published his English-Latin Dictionary. He added over four thousand words which hitherto had no record of translation. In this huge undertaking, he was greatly aided by his friend Henry Radclyffe, 4th Earl of Sussex.

Soon afterwards he published an account of the Spanish Armada in Ireland.

Through his relation, William Stanley, 6th Earl of Derby, he was appointed to the valuable living of Winwick, Lancashire. Ryder also held the patronage of Elizabeth I of England and was described as "a great, personal favourite" of hers. Through her he was first appointed to a prebend in the Chapter of Dublin to pacify the more senior clerics in Ireland so that he could be officially eligible for the position of Dean of St. Patrick's Cathedral, Dublin, which the Queen desired for him. In 1597, following the death of Bishop Richard Meredith and in accordance with Her Majesty's wishes, he was appointed Dean of St. Patrick's, a position he later exchanged for that of Archdeacon of Meath in 1608. In 1598, the Queen gave him the Prebendary of Geashill, which fell under the Cathedral of Kildare. In 1612, he was consecrated Bishop of Killaloe, a position he held until his death on 12 November 1632. He is buried at Killaloe Cathedral, County Clare. He left behind him the "character of a learned and religious prelate".

== Scholarship ==
Between 1599 and 1614, Ryder continued a public controversy with Henry Fitzsimon, an Irish Jesuit, on the subject of the relationship between contemporary Protestantism and the Christianity of the early Church. Although Fitzsimon ran the risk of being prosecuted, and potentially sentenced to death, for heresy or treason, he was "merely bundled out of the country", suggesting, it has been said, that, "Dublin would appear to have been a safer place to voice dissent than London, Paris, or Rome" (Brian Jackson, in Ciaran Brady and Jane Ohlmeyer, eds, British Interventions in Early Modern Ireland [Cambridge: Cambridge University Press, 2005], p. 103). From 1599 to 1614, Ryder had been joined by the Primate of All Ireland, James Ussher, and Meredith Hanmer in succeeding to have Fitzsimon expelled from Ireland.

Besides his famous English-Latin Dictionary (1589) and Account of the Spanish Armada in Ireland, Ryder was the author of two further publications: A Friendly Caveat to Irish Catholiques Concerning Christ's Corporall Presence etc. (1602) and A Claim of Antiquity in behalf of the Protestant Religion (London, 1608). He published a postscript to the latter following an attack by his opponent in this controversy, Henry Fitzsimon.

== Family ==
Ryder was married to Fridswold Crosby, who died 26 January 1615, the daughter of Edward Crosby of Crosby Place, Staffordshire. Their only son, Thomas Ryder, was Secretary to the British Legation at Paris and the father of Henry Rider (d.1695) of Wyanstown, County Dublin who also became the Bishop of Killaloe. Their eldest daughter, Jane, married Walter Weldon, Member of Parliament for Athy and has issue.

== Publications ==
Bibliotheca scholastica

- 1st edn, Oxford: J. Barnes, Printer to the University of Oxford, 1589
- 1st edn (facsimile), Menston: Scolar Press, English linguistics, 1500–1800—a collection of facsimile reprints 217, 1970
- Rider's dictionary corrected and augmented, wherein Rider's index is transformed into a dictionary etymological. Here also the barbarous words are ranged into a dictionary by themselves. By F. Holyoke (London: Adam Islip, 1606)
- 3rd edn, Rider's dictionary corrected and augmented, wherein Rider's index is transformed into a dictionary etymological. Here also the barbarous words are ranged into a dictionary by themselves. By F. Holyoke. Hereunto is annexed a dictionarie etymological by F. Holyoke (Oxford: J. Barnes, Printer to the University of Oxford, 1612)
- Rider's dictionary corrected and augmented, wherein Rider's index is transformed into a dictionary etymological. Here also the barbarous words are ranged into a dictionary by themselves. By F. Holyoke. Hereunto is annexed a dictionary etymological by F. Holyoke (London: Adam Islip for T. Adams, 1617)
- Rider's dictionary as it was heretofore corrected, and with the addition of above five hundred words enriched. Hereunto is annexed a dictionary etymological, deriving every word from his native fountain, with reasons of the derivations; and many Roman antiquities, never an extant in that kind before. By Francis Holyoke. To which are joined (as may appear more largely in the title and epistle before the Latin dictionary) many useful alterations, emendations, and additions of etymologies, differences, antiquities, histories, and their morals by Nicholas Gray (London: Adam Islip for John Bill and F. Kyngston, 1626)
- Rider's dictionary corrected and augmented, wherein Rider's index is transformed into a dictionary etymological. Here also the barbarous words are ranged into a dictionary by themselves. By F. Holyoke. Hereunto is annexed a dictionary etymological by F. Holyoke (London: Adam Islip and F. Kingston for S. Waterson, 1626)
- Dictionarium etymologicum Latinum, that is a dictionary declaring the original and derivations of all words used in any Latin authors. Hereunto is also annexed Rider's dictionary... (Oxford: W. Turner, 1627)
- Rider's dictionary corrected and augmented, wherein Rider's index is transformed into a dictionary etymological. Here also the barbarous words are ranged into a dictionary by themselves. By F. Holyoke. Hereunto is annexed a dictionary etymological by F. Holyoke (London: n.p., 1649)
- 4th edn, Dictionarium etymologicum Latinum, that is a dictionary declaring the original and derivations of all words used in any Latin authors. Hereunto is also annexed Rider's dictionary...the fourth time newly corrected (London: Adam Islip and F. Kyngston, 1633)
- 5th edn, Dictionarium etymologicum Latinum, that is a dictionary declaring the original and derivations of all words used in any Latin authors. Hereunto is also annexed Rider's dictionary...the fifth time newly corrected (London: F. Kingston for I. Waterson, 1640)
- 5th edn, Dictionarium etymologicum Latinum, that is a dictionary declaring the original and derivations of all words used in any Latin authors. Hereunto is also annexed Rider's dictionary...the fifth time newly corrected (London: F. Kingston for A. Crooke, 1640)

Spanish Armada in Ireland

- The coppie of a letter sent from m. Rider, deane of Saint Patricks, concerning the newes out of Ireland, and of the Spaniards landing and present estate there (London: for T. Man, 1601)

== Sources ==
=== Bibliography ===
- Lawson, Richard (2009), A History of Flixton, Urmston, and Davyhulme, BiblioBazaar, LLC, ISBN 978-1-103-05928-7
- James Frost, The History and Topography of the County of Clare, Part I: Topography of Thomond, Chapter 10: Ui Toirdhealbhaigh, List of the Protestant Bishops of Killaloe
- From: 'Appendix: Corrections to volume 1', The Environs of London: volume 4: Counties of Herts, Essex & Kent (1796), pp. 577–617. Date accessed: 24 April 2007
- From: 'Parishes: South Ockendon', A History of the County of Essex: Volume 7 (1978), pp. 117–26. Date accessed: 24 April 2007
- RootsWeb
- OLIS web OPAC
- Brian Jackson, chapter in Ciaran Brady and Jane Ohlmeyer, eds, British Interventions in Early Modern Ireland (Cambridge: Cambridge University Press, 2005)
- Karl S. Bottigheimer, review of Ciaran Brady and Jane Ohlmeyer, eds, British Interventions in Early Modern Ireland (Cambridge: Cambridge University Press, 2005), sehepunkte 6:3 (15 March 2006)
