= Henry Rider =

Irish Anglican bishop (died 1696))

Henry Rider ( b Paris; d Clonmethan 30 January 1696) was an 18th-century Anglican bishop in Ireland.

Rider was born in Paris, where his father Thomas Ryder was Secretary to the British Legation. He was educated at Westminster School and Trinity College, Cambridge. He became a prebendary of Ossory in 1681; and of St Patrick's Cathedral, Dublin in 1683. He was appointed Archdeacon of Ossory in 1692, and Bishop of Killaloe in 1693, an office which his grandfather had previously held, John Rider.
