= Cornelia Rider-Possart =

American pianist

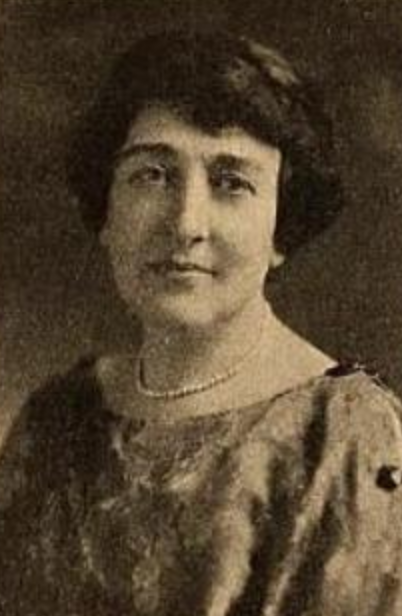
- Cornelia Rider-Possart, from a 1923 publication
- Born: Cornelia Rider; December 14, 1865; Dubuque, Iowa, U.S.
- Died: July 1963 (age 97); New York, New York, U.S.
- Occupation: Pianist
- Relatives: Ernst von Possart (father-in-law)

Cornelia Rider-Possart (December 14, 1865 – July 1963) was an American pianist.

== Early life and education ==
Rider was born in Dubuque, Iowa, the daughter of John Vincent Rider and Viola Gertrude Smead Rider. She studied piano at the Sherwood School of Music in Chicago, and with Varette Stepanoff, a follower of Theodor Leschetizky, in Germany.

== Career ==
Rider-Possart was a concert pianist in Germany in the early 1900s. She accompanied German singer Johanna Gadski in Chicago in 1904, and performed with Ernst Kunwald in Berlin in 1908. "Madame Possart is one of the most legitimate, most musical, and most satisfactory women pianists for the public," reported Musical Courier about that event. "Her technic is clean, sure, and pearly, and her tone has a beautiful singing quality." In 1911, she accompanied German tenor Hans Ellenson in his New York debut.

Rider-Possart played at the Maine Music Festival in 1913, and with the Calgary Symphony Orchestra in 1914. She was in Los Angeles by summer 1915, for a performance at the Friday Morning Club. She joined violinist Lili Petschnikoff at a series of three musicale events at Petschnikoff's Hollywood home in 1919. She played at the Hollywood Bowl in 1921, 1922, and 1923. She gave concerts at New York's Aeolian Hall in 1913, 1922, and 1924. In 1922 she accompanied Marcella Craft at a performance in Los Angeles. In 1923, she played with both the New York Philharmonic and with the Los Angeles Philharmonic. In 1926 and 1927, she played with the Guarneri String Quartet in Berlin.

Rider-Possart also wrote music, and recorded some player piano rolls for the Wilcox & White Company. She was a social friend of many musicians in Los Angeles, including Leopold Stokowski.

== Personal life ==
Rider married German theater censor Hermann Ludwig Possart, son of actor Ernst von Possart, in 1902. He died in 1912. She lived in Los Angeles for much of her later life, though she also lived in Berlin in the late 1920s, in Paris in the 1930s, and in New York City with her niece, artist Viola Burden Lange. She died in 1963, at age 97, in New York City.
