= Hannah Ryder =

Kenyan business consultant

Hannah Wanjie Ryder is a Kenyan citizen known for her work on trade between China and Africa. As of 2024 she is the chief executive officer of the consulting firm Development Reimagined.

== Early life ==
Ryder was born in Kenya and her family moved to the United Kingdom when she was ten years old. She studied economics first at Oaklands College and then the University of Sussex, and then earned an M.Sc. in economics. After graduation she started work at the Department for International Development and she worked on relationships between the United Kingdom and developing counties. From 2014 until 2016 she worked as the lead of the Policy and Partnerships at the United Nations Development Programme. During this time she worked on China's policies regarding funding for international aid.

After working at the United Nations, she founded Development Reimagined, an international development consultancy in 2017 specializing in Africa-China relationship. The company's headquarters are in Beijing, as of 2024 Ryder is the chief executive officer.

== Work ==
Ryder's early work was on the connections between climate and economics. She was one of the co-authors of the Stern Review, a 2006 report on the economic impacts of climate change.

Ryder is primarily known for her work on international relations between China and Africa. She has advocated for developing countries to ask for more when negotiating with China, and in 2019 Ryder was at a meeting centered on discussions of the Belt and Road Initiative, China's infrastructure plan. Ryder's writings were used to set the stage for a 2017 conference on China-Africa relations, and in 2018 she discussed the impact of debt to China on African countries.

At the onset of the COVID-19 pandemic Ryder spoke about African students potentially exposed to the virus in China, on the impact of COVID-19 on trade between China and Africa, and how blame for imported COVID cases maybe been attributed to migrants in China. Ryder participated in the 2020 Forum on China–Africa Cooperation, a collaboration aimed at improving relations between China and Africa.

Upon the 2023 nomination of Ajay Banga to the World Bank, Ryder noted he should consider the example of the African Development Bank in terms of how the World Bank could function. She also spoke on Bloomberg News about the needs of Africa in regards to climate change. Ryder has joined in the clamor for the institutionalization of an Africa credit ratings agency, which when operational can play a central role in reducing the costly 'African risk premium', tipping lending in favor of borrower countries.

== Honors and awards ==
In 2012 The Guardian recognized her with their Observer Ethical Award for her writing on economics, poverty, and climate change. In 2016 Ryder was nominated as a rising star by the New African Woman Forum.
