= Freddie Ryder =

English singer and rhythm guitarist (1942–2021)

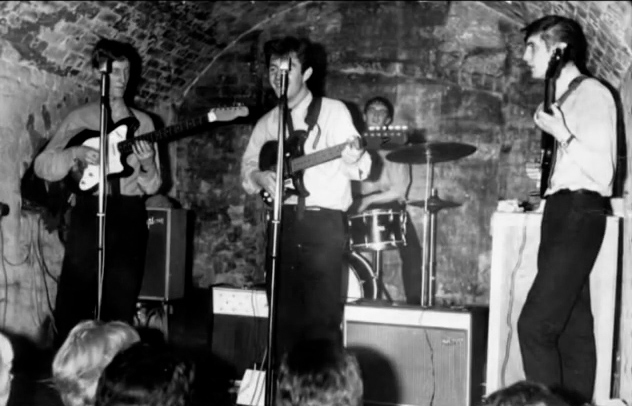
The Beatcombers performing at the Cavern Club, Liverpool in 1963. Left to right: Tony Priestley, Freddie Ryder, John Hayes, Mike Kelly

Freddie Ryder (born Self; 3 April 1942 – 22 January 2021) was an English singer and rhythm guitarist from Liverpool. He was part of the 'Beat Movement' that spawned a raft of British bands who conquered the charts in the early 1960s.

== Life and career ==
He was born in Liverpool to Fredrick and Marion Self; following school he studied and qualified as an engineer, his real interest however was in music and he started singing as a small boy entertaining family and neighbours.

Ryder started out performing for The Bobby Bell Rockers, one of Liverpool's first rock and roll bands and was subsequently persuaded to become their lead vocalist. After responding to a local newspaper article, Ryder joined The Beatcombers, another local band who did well during this period, regularly playing the Cavern Club and performing the night U.S. president John F. Kennedy was shot.

After relocating to London in December 1963, the band was spotted by Billy Fury's manager and pop impresario Larry Parnes who signed them as The Trends in January 1964. As their following gained momentum, The Trends became regulars at some of the major venues in London. As part of the Merseybeat movement they were regularly watched by The Beatles often watching and supporting them at gigs and vice versa. Upon The Beatles’ return from their first US tour, Brian Epstein hosted an exclusive welcome home celebration at the Kensington home of pop star Alma Cogan and The Trends were invited to perform.

The day after their successful recording audition in early January 1964, The Trends left to play at the Star-Club in Hamburg. When they returned they released their debut single, a cover of the Lennon–McCartney song, "All My Loving". The second and final single was a cover Marvin Gaye's "You're a Wonderful One" released on 8 May 1964.

By the end of 1964 The Trends had parted. Ryder then went onto forge a solo career, recording primarily at Abbey Road Studios where he worked alongside session musicians Jimmy Page and Clem Cattini. He briefly deputised with The Fourmost when member Mike Millward became ill in early 1965.

While working on his solo career, Ryder went on to become a station producer for the Radio Caroline pirate radio station. He worked at the station up until the last day when the Marine Broadcasting Offences Act 1967 came into effect.

Ryder continued to work in the broadcast industry during his career, and he went on to start a broadcast installation company that built the studios used at the time by Talksport, Classic FM and Capital FM.

== Death ==
Freddie Ryder died on 22 January 2021, in London, England. He was 78 years old.
