= John Ryder (state representative) =

American politician (1862–1940)

John Ryder (1862–1940) was an American politician.

John Ryder was born in Dubuque, Iowa, in 1862, to parents Patrick and Estelle Ryder. He attended schools associated with the Roman Catholic Archdiocese of Dubuque, and graduated from Bayless Business College. Ryder and his brother Philip where longtime business partners, running the Ryder Brothers Wholesale Grocery Company, and in 1919, expanding their holdings to the Ryder Realty Company. John Ryder retired from his executive position in 1925. He was married to Anna L. Killeen from November 1917 to her death in May 1923.

Ryder, a Democrat, won his first election to the Iowa House of Representatives in 1924, and held the District 69 seat for seven consecutive terms, through 1939. He had also been elected to Dubuque's school board in March 1925. Ryder died in Dubuque on 9 March 1940.
