= Meredith Hanmer =

Welsh clergyman

Meredith Hanmer (1543–1604) was a Welsh clergyman, known as a controversialist, historian, and translator. He was considered embittered, by the Lord Deputy of Ireland, William Russell, 1st Baron Russell of Thornhaugh; but he appears now as a shrewd observer of the Protestant and nonconformist life of Ireland as founded around Trinity College, Dublin.

== Life ==
The son of Richard ap David ap Howel Goch of Pentre-pant, Selattyn, near Oswestry, he was born at Porkington in Shropshire in 1543. He was educated at Corpus Christi College, Oxford, where he obtained a chaplaincy in 1567, and graduated B.A. 1568, M.A. 1572, and D.D. 1582. On 7 June 1575, by a special dispensation, he was allowed to supplicate for the degree of B.D., as a nobleman's chaplain, while of less than the customary standing; but the degree was not granted till 1581.

He was vicar of St Leonard's, Shoreditch, from 8 December 1581 till June 1592, and vicar of St Mary's, Islington from 4 November 1583 to 5 September 1590. At Shoreditch he made himself notorious by removing the monumental brasses in the church, which he was believed to have done for his own gain. In 1584, when George Talbot, 6th Earl of Shrewsbury was examined as to the circulation of a libel that he had got Mary, Queen of Scots by child, Hanmer appeared as a witness against the earl, and is described by William Fleetword, recorder of London, who appeared in the case, as 'regarding not' an oath, 'and as a very bad man'. According to the consistorial acts of the diocese of Rochester, Hanmer was charged between 1588 and 1590 with having celebrated a marriage without banns or license.

He crossed over to Ireland about 1591. In that year he appears as archdeacon of Ross and vicar of Timoleague. He was commended to Francis Walsingham by Christopher Carleill as a diligent preacher. On 4 December 1593 he was appointed treasurer of Waterford Cathedral, vacant by the deprivation of Thomas Granger; in April 1594 vicar-choral of Christ Church Cathedral, Dublin; on 8 June 1595 prebendary of St Michan's in Christ Church; and on 1 November of the same year rector of the Blessed Virgin Mary de Borages, in Leighlin. On 1 June 1598 he was presented to the parish church of Muckalee, the vicarage of Rathpatrick, and the vicarage of Kylbeacon and Killaghy, all in county Kilkenny, in the diocese of Ossory. On 10 October in the following year he was presented to the rectory or wardenship of the new college of the Blessed Mary of Youghal in the diocese of Cloyne (ib. 6345). He appears to have resigned this and his prebend of St Michan's in 1602. On 16 June 1603 he was appointed chancellor of St Canice's Cathedral, Kilkenny, and at the same time vicar of Fiddown and St John the Evangelist, and rector of Aglish-Martin.

He died in 1604, and was buried in St Michan's Church, Dublin. It is likely that he fell a victim to the bubonic plague. Hanmer married at Shoreditch, 21 June 1581, Mary Austin, by whom he had four daughters.

== Works ==
His Chronicle of Ireland, first published by Sir James Ware in 1633, is a scholarly work. He translated three early ecclesiastical historians - Eusebius, Socrates of Constantinople and Evagrius Scholasticus - in 1576.

Hanmer also wrote:

- The Great Bragge and Challenge of M. Champion ... confuted and answered by M.H., London, 1581.
- The Jesuites Banner. ... With a Confutation of a late Pamphlet ... entitled A Brief Censure upon two Books written in Answeare to M. Champion's [Campion's] offer of disputation, &c., London, 1581. These were works against Edward Campion.
- The Baptizing of a Turke, a sermon (on Matt, v. 16), preached 2 October 1586 at the collegiate church of St Katharine, London, 1586. This sermon was occasioned by the liberation of galley slaves from the Spanish Caribbean, by Sir Francis Drake, of which one became a Christian convert, rather than take the passage offered back to the Ottoman Empire.
