= Kathleen Ryder =

Irish camogie player (born 1934)

Personal information
- Native name: Caitlín Ní Mharcaigh (Irish)
- Born: 15 June 1934 (age 92) Dublin, Ireland

Sport
- Sport: Camogie
- Position: centre back, centre field, wing, centre forward
Club*
Years	Club	Apps (scores)
	Naomh Aoife	?
Inter-county**
Years	County	Apps (scores)
1955-67	Dublin	?
Inter-county titles
- All-Irelands: 10
- * club appearances and scores correct as of (16:31, 30 June 2010 (UTC)). **Inter County team apps and scores correct as of (16:31, 30 June 2010 (UTC)).

Kathleen Ryder (born 15 June 1934), better known as Kay Ryder, is an Irish former camogie player, captain of the All Ireland Camogie Championship winning team in 1965 and 1966. She won ten All Ireland senior medals in all.

== Career ==
Ryder first played for Dublin at the age of 21 as a sub in the 1955 All Ireland semi-final against Mayo and held her place for 12 years, winning the first of ten All Ireland medals in 1957. She won the first of five Gael Linn cup medals with Leinster in 1956, playing her last match for Leinster in the unsuccessful final of 1966. She won five successive Ashbourne Cup honours with UCD between 1958 and 1962. In 1965 she became the second player in camogie history to captain her side to victory in both the All Ireland Camogie Championship and Gael Linn Cup for inter-provincial teams in the same year.
