= John F. Rider =

American radio engineer

John Francis Rider
- Born: 1900; Hungary
- Died: 1985 (aged 84–85); Miami, Florida
- Occupations: Acting director (Signal Corps Publication Agency, US army), radio engineer, author and publisher
- Known for: Publishing yearly volumes of the "Perpetual Troubleshooter's Manual" 1931–1954
- Title: Lt. Col. John F. Rider, Signal Corps, US Army (Ret.)
- Spouse(s): Florence Rider, Born approx. 1907, New York
- Children: Janet Rider, Born approx. 1932, New York
- Call sign: W2RID
- Awards: Legion of Merit (February 1946)

John Francis Rider (1900–1985) was an American radio engineer best known as publisher and author of over 125 books for radio and television servicing. He founded John F. Rider Publisher Inc. and was responsible for annual volumes of the Perpetual Troubleshooter's Manual from 1931 to 1954.

== Early years ==
Born in 1900 to Austro-Hungarian parents, John Francis Rider immigrated to the United States in 1902 and grew up during the invention of the vacuum tube by John Ambrose Fleming and Lee de Forest and the invention of radio by Guglielmo Marconi. Before getting involved into publishing he served at the rank of Lt. Colonel for the US Signal Corps after military service he became a radio engineer for Alfred H. Grebe a manufacturer of radios. According to Alan Douglas, a noted radio historian, Rider may have been one of the many engineers that worked on Grebe's top-of-the-line Synchrophase 7 Receivers in 1927. He states, "John Rider was a good engineer, aside from his publishing career. I believe he designed the audio system of the 1927 Grebe Synchrophase 7, arguably the first hi-fi radio (response to 8 kHz, way ahead of broadcast standards of the day). He conceived the idea of a tuned analyzer (Chanalyst) and sold the first VTVM using the balanced-bridge circuit that became universal for decades (Voltohmyst). He got his name on several patents in the test-equipment field, and wrote a large number of books himself".

Rider probably accumulated a lot of knowledge through his military experience and radio engineering which enabled him to work for Hugo Gernsback as editor for Gernsback's Radio-Craft magazine. During the 1920s with the rise of radio manufacturers came the rise of the radio servicing business. The need for radio servicing literature (schematics, parts list, production changes etc.) rose. Gernsback started to produce compilations of servicing data for radio repair. Rider was also an amateur radio operator and his call letters were W2RID.

== John F. Rider Publisher Inc. ==
Rider left Gernsback Publishing to start his own publishing company, John F. Rider Publisher at 404 Fourth Avenue, New York City (later moved to 480 Canal St., New York City). He, like Gernsback Publishing before him, was involved with radio servicing literature. In early 1931, John F. Rider's Perpetual Troubleshooter's Manual was`published. The book consisted of genuine service technical data from the radio manufacturers. Each volume represented a year of service data. This, in time became his best known and greatest contribution to the business. There were a total of 23 volumes, ending in 1954. Rider also published over 125 other technical books on servicing and radio theory authored by him or in collaboration. He was a contributor to the WW2 US war effort through his technical publications and teaching military personnel for the US Army.

After WW2, many of the military training manuals were available at little or minimal charge. This was a great opportunity for publishers to capitalize on this as men leaving active military duty were looking to start a career or retrain. In 1955, Rider published the Basic Electronics series, based on the US Navy training books used in their training classes.

== The Perpetual Troubleshooter's Manual 1931–1954 ==
The Perpetual Troubleshooter's Manual is considered by radio collectors and restorers as his most important work. Rider made great strides to work with as many radio manufacturers as possible to get any servicing information that was available. As a result, the yearly bound volumes got quite large (sometimes over 600 pages). Manufacturers represented were mainly from the United States. Often, many uncommon and obscure models were listed. This gave others, like Supreme Publications owner Morris N. Beitman, an opportunity to provide a source of more common models, cutting the size and cost of obtaining service literature.

Rider stopped publishing the yearly Perpetual Troubleshooter's Manual in 1954 for many reasons. One reason was the introduction of television in 1946. Rider started a Perpetual Troubleshooter's Manual series for television. The television bound volumes became too large and there were many production changes for the models listed that Rider did not always have the opportunity to update or publish supplements. The other and probably the best reason that forced the end of John F. Rider, Publisher Inc., was that Howard W. Sams Publishing or SAMS Publishing of Indianapolis, IN, developed and copyrighted the Photofact service folder that had all the things that Rider provided but added large photographs to identify the parts along with much better written servicing instructions. This became important in complex circuits that had a high parts density in a given area, such as television and hi-fidelity equipment. Such products became more prevalent after 1946, which coincides with the beginning of SAM's Photofacts. The large volume of TV service data was partly the result of RCA promoting the NTSC television design (based on its model 6TS30 chassis) by giving away its television designs for no royalties, and the rapid improvements in technology and production methods. Furthermore, SAMS Publishing released service notes by folder number (containing specific makes and models) rather than large bound volumes, making it easier to purchase servicing information.

== The end of John F. Rider Publisher Inc. ==
In 1955 John F. Rider Publications and all rights were acquired by Hayden Books. He stayed with Hayden until 1959. Rider retired from publishing in 1963 and moved to Florida. In 1985, he died in Miami. Other credits to his name include the Legion of Merit (LOM) Award and the Ralph Batcher Memorial Award in 1977, presented to him by the Radio Club of America, for his preservation of radio and electronic communications in the United States.

== Military service ==
Shortly after Pearl Harbor, Col. Rider entered the service (age 42) with the grade of captain and after a brief stay at Ft. Monmouth was assigned to the Signal Corps Radar School (later, the Southern Signal Corps School) at Camp Murphy, Florida. There he organized and directed the Training Literature Division, whose responsibility was the preparation and printing of the texts to be used for the training of Early Warning and Antiaircraft Artillery radar maintenance personnel. It was in this school that virtually all ground force radar equipment maintenance personnel were trained. In addition, the school also trained ground force radar equipment operators and some airborne radar equipment maintenance men.

During his tour of duty at the SSCS, he was given a special assignment at Baltimore to direct the preparation of the prototype for all technical manuals on radar equipment to be used by the army. After about 20 months at Camp Murphy, Col. Rider was ordered to Ft. Monmouth to organize the Radar Division of the Signal Corps Publication Agency. This organization was responsible for the preparation of all literature (technical) on all signal-communication equipment procured by the Signal Corps, which covered everything from pigeons to radar. After about seven months of activity on radar literature, Col. Rider was made executive officer of the entire agency and placed in charge of all operations. Later, he became deputy director and when retired, he was acting director.

During his army career, Col. Rider received a number of commendations from the Chief Signal Officer and the Adjutant General, the Meritorious Service citation, and in February 1946, he was awarded the Legion of Merit decoration.

== Other publications ==
The earliest known year of publishing is given. Many of the books listed were later updated or revised by Rider to be on pace with current technology and servicing practices. All books were written by John F. Rider. Books that were co-written are noted by the person's name.

| Title | Earliest Publication Date | Co-Author | Comment |
| The Mathematics of Radio | 1929 | ----- | |
| A.C. Tubes And How To Use Them | 1929? | ----- | Need to confirm the earliest publication date. |
| Trouble Shooter's Manual: Volume II, The Service Man's Manual | 1929 | ----- | Pre-Perpetual Trouble Shooter's Manual. Bound, Soft Cover. |
| A Treatise on Testing Units for the Service Men | 1929 | ----- | |
| Sound Pictures And Trouble Shooter's Manual | 1930 | James R. Cameron | Cameron Publishing Company. James R. Cameron introduces John F. Rider as a new writer to readers of motion picture text books. |
| Practical Testing Systems | 1930 | ----- | |
| Practical Radio Repairing Hints | 1931 | ----- | |
| Servicing Superheterodynes | December 1931 | ----- | This is the Original Edition, 1st Printing. The Revised Edition, 1st Printing July, 1934 |
| Servicing Receivers by means of Resistance Measurements | 1932 | ----- | |
| The Cathode-Ray Tube at Work | August 1935 | ----- | |
| An Hour A Day with Rider On: Automatic Volume Control | 1936 | ----- | |
| An Hour A Day with Rider On: Resonance And Alignment | 1936 | ----- | |
| An Hour A Day with Rider On: D-C. Voltage Distribution In Radio Receivers | 1936 | ----- | |
| An Hour A Day with Rider On: Alternating Currents In Radio Receivers | 1937 | ----- | |
| Aligning Philco Receivers | 1937 | ----- | Volume I |
| Automatic Frequency Control Systems | 1937 | ----- | |
| Servicing By Signal Tracing | 1939 | ----- | |
| FM: An Introduction To Frequency Modulation | March 1940 | ----- | |
| The Oscillator at Work | 1940 | ----- | |
| The Meter at Work | December 1940 | ----- | Split-Book, Upper is for illustrations, Lower is for text. |
| Vacuum Tube Voltmeters | 1941 | ----- | |
| Automatic Record Changers and Recorders | 1941 | ----- | |
| Aligning Philco Receivers: Volume II | 1941 | ----- | |
| Frequency Modulation | 1943 | ----- | |
| Inside The Vacuum Tube | 1945 | ----- | Illustrated by Baxter Rowe. Stereoscopic Effect on Anaglyphs facing pages 9, 37, and 122, by using included Red/Blue Spectacles. |
| RADAR: What It Is | 1946 | George Clemens Baxter Rowe | An easily understood explanation – How it did its job. |
| Understanding Vectors and Phase | 1947 | Seymour Uslan | |
| FM Transmission and Reception | January 1948 | Seymour Uslan | Second Edition: November 1950 . Last printing: November 1955 |
| Television: How It Works | June 1948 | ----- | |
| Installation and Servicing Low Cost Public Address Systems | 1948 | ----- | |
| Rider Public Address Equipment Manual: Volume I | 1948 | ----- | |
| Volume 1 and 2 Rider's Television Manual | 1949 | ----- | |
| Encyclopedia of Cathode Ray Oscilloscopes and Their Uses | 1950 | Seymour Uslan | |
| Radio Troubleshooting Guidebook | 1954 | J. Richard Johnson | |
| Obtaining & Interpreting Test Scope Traces | 195? | ----- | |
| Magnetism and Electromagnetism | 1959 | ----- | |

== The On Line Rider's Perpetual Troubleshooter's Manual- Nostalgia Air Project ==
With the large interest of restoration and saving consumer "dead technology", the need for Rider servicing literature has grown. At this time the Rider servicing manuals are public domain. For historical and preservation reasons Nostalgia Air took on a long-term task of digitizing the thousands of pages of all 23 volumes of the Perpetual Troubleshooter's Manuals and designing the manufacturer index to allow one to have access to all volumes. Nostalgia Air provides free access and downloading for non-commercial use only. Because of the public domain status and the availability of modern scanning and digitizing technology, there are businesses selling the complete 23 volumes on one DVD.
