= William Rider =

English historian, priest and writer

William Rider (1723 – 30 November 1785) was an English historian, priest and writer. Whilst he wrote a number of works, his New Universal Dictionary suffered in comparison with that written by Samuel Johnson and his 50-volume work A New History of England was unsuccessful; it was later described as one of the vilest Grub Street compilations ever published. He was a chaplain and master at St Paul's School for many years, as well as being associated with the Mercers' Company and churches in the City of London.

== Life ==
Rider was baptized in the church of St Botolph-without-Bishopsgate in London on 14 May 1723. After studying at Mr Watkin's academy in Spital Square, Rider moved to the University of Oxford. He initially matriculated at St Mary Hall in 1739 before moving to Jesus College, holding a scholarship there from 1744 to 1749. He obtained his Bachelor of Arts degree in 1745 and was ordained. He became chaplain of the Mercers' Company and of St Paul's School, lecturer of St Vedast Foster Lane and curate of St Faith's church, London. He was surmaster at St Paul's School from 1763 to 1783, when ill-health forced his retirement. He died on 30 November 1785, survived by his widow Hannah and son John.

== Works ==
Rider turned his hand to various topics: history, lexicography, translations, poetry and sermons. He translated Voltaire's Candide in 1759 (the same year that it was published). He wrote A New Universal Dictionary, or, A Compleat Treasure of the English Language (1759) and dedicated it to Pitt the Elder; it demonstrated Rider's knowledge of Anglo-Saxon, Welsh and German but could not compete with Johnson's Dictionary. He also wrote the 50-volume A New History of England (1761–64, together with an accompanying atlas in 1764), which he dedicated to King George III, covering the history of England from pre-Roman times until 1763. Whilst it was designed to be an affordable and accessible history, it was not a success and was later described by William Thomas Lowndes as one of the vilest Grub Street compilations ever published. In 1762, he published (anonymously) An Historical and Critical Account of the Lives and Writings of the Living Authors of Great Britain. This described the works of Tobias Smollett, David Hume, Samuel Johnson and others, including himself (with a favourable mention of his own writings). He published various sermons, and poetry in The Gentleman's Magazine under the pseudonym of Philargyrus. He also wrote lengthy commentary for The Christian Family's Bible (1763–77, 3 volumes).
