= William Ryder (MP) =

English politician

William Ryder (died 1432/33), of Totnes, Devon was an English politician.

He was a member (MP) of the parliament of England for Totnes in November 1414.
