= Jack Van Ryder =

American painter (1899–1967)

- Born: Jack Van Ryder; July 7, 1899; Continental Arizona
- Died: 1967 (aged 67–68); Amado, Arizona (outside Tucson, Arizona)
- Education: Self-taught
- Known for: Art; Painter, illustrator, printmaker, cowboy
- Movement: landscape, regionalism, cowboy

Jack Van Ryder (1899 – 1967) was an American cowboy and western artist. His colorful life was a series of cinematic moments, the fodder that inspired his distinctively western art. He punched cows and drove freight wagons. He chased wild horses and rode bucking broncos all the way from the Powder River to the Gila, from Cheyenne to Carson City, from Butte to Bisbee. Ryder's paintings captured the dusty brooding southwestern twilight skies.

== Life ==
He was born on his father's ranch in Continental, Arizona on July 7, 1899. Van Ryder spent his younger days as a cowboy. He ran away from home at the age of 13 for the logging camps of Oregon and the Salmon fishing along the Tillamock and Trask Rivers. He then showed up in Montana, where he was a wrangler for four years. He served in the 4th and 17th U.S. Cavalry, and in the 38th US Infantry from 1917 to 1921. Then he returned to the West, roaming cow country from the Canada–US border to Mexico, from Colorado to California. He called himself "The Rambling Kid."

In 1924, he headed to Hollywood to work as an extra in a Hoot Gibson western. In 1926, he was offered an art job at the Mark Sennet Studios, working on a giant relief map of California that was installed in San Francisco's Ferry Building.

He began competing in rodeos all across the country. He took his paints with him as he traveled the country on the rodeo circuit. It was not long before he renowned as an artist and exceeded his rodeo fame.

During World War II, he was with Consolidated Aircraft and at the end, on Long Range Submarines. After the war, he settled near his birthplace in Tombstone, Arizona. He died by a self-inflicted gunshot wound on his ranch outside of Amado in 1967. Jack Van Ryder epitomized the artist-cowboy and his legacy helped shape romantic views of the southwest.

== Artistic development ==
His early work was pen or graphite on paper; he later turned to oils. In October 1928, his first one-man show, at the Montross Galleries on East 56th Street in New York, sold out within three weeks. Returning from New York, he purchased the Diamond S. Ranch at Camp Verde, but sold it in 1932.

His western landscape paintings were bold and emotional, often in soft hues of purple and blue with expansive skies. His tonality and capacity to articulate the southwestern spirit infused his work with both tension and ease. He was commissioned to paint a series of western murals for the American Museum of Natural History.

His paintings hung in galleries and museums from New York to LA. One of his paintings won the Corcoran Prize, and in 1936, he had a one-man show of 36 oil paintings in the Gainsborough Galleries. He had six major exhibits in New York, one in Chicago, one in St. Louis, Cincinnati and Toledo, Ohio.

He illustrated books and painted magazine covers, including Jack Weadock's picture of Tucson: "Dust of the Desert." His paintings, watercolors and etchings arose from his memories of the changing West.

Van Ryder won the Guild Hall Prize in East Hampton in 1936. He was a member of the Illustrator Club and the National Arts Club of New York.

Jack was married 9 times, twice to the same woman. He had one known son, David Colt Van Ryder. Jack was a prolific cowboy - rodeo circuit performer. He enjoyed his spirits and was thrown in jail for being disorderly, he torn the jail up so badly in getting out that the sheriff decided to never arrest him again. Jack was a hard charging cowboy with energy. He accompanied American Western artist Charles Russell on a horseback trip through Montana and the Dakotas. They traveled together to explore and paint the American Indians of the region. Jack learned his art skills from Charles Russell on that lengthy trip. Jack Van Ryder became friends with Henry Ford as a result of being a cowboy at a high end dude ranch in Taos New Mexico, Henry Ford liked Jack's no nonsense straight forward ways. Jack did not treat Henry any different than anybody else, and apparently Henry liked the no BS friendship. These are the personal accounts from his wife Mary Colt Van Ryder of Hartford Connecticut as she relayed them to me.

== Museum Collection ==
- Desert Caballeros Western Museum
- Tucson Museum of Art
- Great Plains Art Museum
- Will Rogers Ranch Collection
- The Arizona Historical Society, Southern Arizona
- University of Wyoming Art Museum
- Arizona Committee of the National Museum of Women in the Arts
- Amerind Museum
