= Jack McBride Ryder =

American academic (1928–2019)

Jack McBride Ryder (1928 – April 2019) was the second president of Saginaw Valley State College.

Ryder was born December 2, 1928, in Newport, Kentucky. He graduated in 1947 from Bellevue High School (Bellevue, Kentucky). He served 24 months in the United States Army, and upon discharge enrolled at Michigan State University. He graduated in 1952 with a bachelor of science degree. After graduation he served as a teacher and principal of the Anglo-American Schools, Athens Greece. In 1954 he returned to MSU for graduate work, earning his master of administration in 1962. He graduated with high honors with membership in Phi Kappa Phi, Kappa Delta, and Phi Delta Kappa. He won the Hinman Graduate Fellowship in 1961.

Ryder was superintendent of Brady Community Schools, Saginaw County, from 1955 to 1957, and a member of the Saginaw County School Administrators Association. From 1957 to 1962 he was an assistant instructor in the MSU College of Education. In 1962 he was named assistant to the dean of University Extension Administration with the rank of associate professor at Purdue University, Lafayette, Indiana. In 1963 he was named director of the Purdue University's Indianapolis campus. From January 1964 to October 1965 he was interim director, on part-time loan from Purdue, of the Indiana Vocational Technical College, a new institution created by the State of Indiana to provide vocational technical education at the post high school level. In February 1969 he was promoted to vice chancellor and dean, with rank of full professor in higher education, of the Indiana University-Purdue University joint campus at Indianapolis. He became vice chancellor and dean for administrative affairs of the IU-PUI campus in 1970, the position he held when named Saginaw Valley State College President in October 1974. He assumed full-time duties at SVSC on November 1, 1974.

Ryder succeeded SVSC President Sam Marble until his retirement in 1989. While Marble's term was considered SVSU's founding administration, the University began to grow during Ryder's term. Six facilities costing a total of $55.2 million were constructed during his 15 years as the University's president. Among the building that went up during those years were Pioneer Hall, the Administrative Services Building, the Pine Grove Apartments, the Melvin J. Zahnow Library, the Arbury Fine Arts Center, and the Health and Physical Education Center. Student enrollment also increased under his presidency by 180 percent, and the number of faculty jumped 120 percent from 2,350 to 6,000 students.

The 185,000 square feet (17,200 m^{2}), $18.7 million Ryder Center is named in dedication to Ryder.

== Sources ==
- The Inauguration of Jack McBride Ryder as the second president of Saginaw Valley State University program, 9/19/75
- The Valley Vanguard, 3/12/01
- The Saginaw News 4/23/89
- SVSU Page on Ryder
- MSU Graduate Scholarships/Fellowships
