= John Ryder (actor) =

English actor (1814–1885)

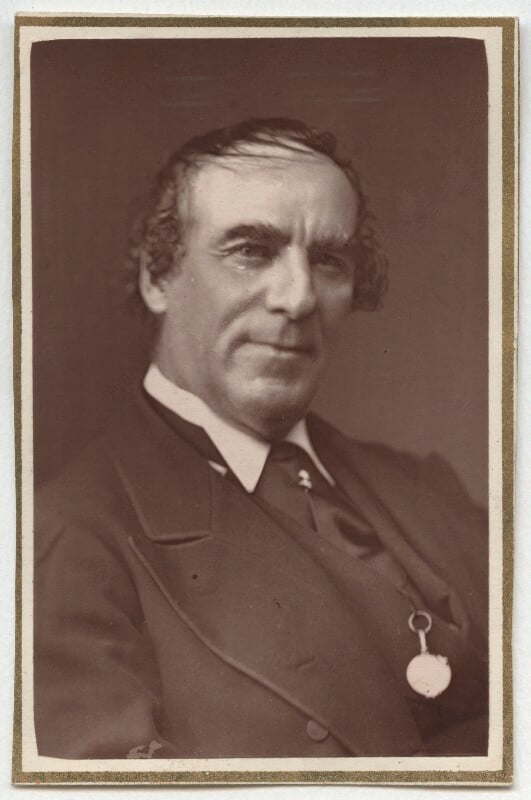
Ryder in the 1870s

John Nicholas Robins (5 April 1814 – 27 March 1885), known as John Ryder, was an English actor.

Engaged by W. C. Macready, he played in most of Macready's productions, including As You Like It, at Drury Lane Theatre from 1842. He also toured with Macready to America in 1843 and 1849.

In the 1850s he played in many of Charles Kean's productions at the Princes Theatre.

With a large number of appearances across the London stage, he was noted for his powerful voice, height and imposing physique.

He died at Brixton and was buried at West Norwood Cemetery.
