= Percy Kirke (British Army officer) =

Lieutenant-General Percy Kirke
- Born: 1684
- Died: 1 January 1741 (aged 56–57)
- Burial place: Westminster Abbey
- Military career
- Allegiance: Kingdom of Great Britain
- Branch: British Army
- Rank: Lieutenant-General
- Conflicts: War of the Spanish Succession

Lieutenant-General Percy Kirke (1684 – 1 January 1741) was a British Army officer who became colonel of the 2nd (The Queen's Royal) Regiment of Foot.

== Military career ==
Kirke was commissioned as an ensign in Trelawny's Regiment in 1686. He was taken as a prisoner of war at the Battle of Almansa in April 1707 during the War of the Spanish Succession. He went on to be colonel of the 2nd (The Queen's Royal) Regiment of Foot in 1710. As was usual at the time, this regiment was also named after its current colonel, from one of whom, Percy Kirke, it acquired its nickname Kirke's Lambs.

Kirke died on 1 January 1741 and was buried at Westminster Abbey.

== Sources ==
- Cannon, Richard (1838). Historical Record of the Second, or Queen's Royal Regiment of Foot. London: Clowes and Sons.

Military offices
Preceded by The Earl Portmore	Colonel of the 2nd (The Queen's Royal) Regiment of Foot; 1710–1741	Succeeded by Thomas Fowke
