= William Graham (British Army officer) =

British Army officer

Brigadier-General William Graham (died 29 September 1747) was a British Army officer from Balliheridon, county Armagh, Ireland.

== Biography ==
Graham joined the Army as an ensign in the 2nd (Queen's) Regiment of Foot on 1 September 1706, and was present at the Battle of Almanza, where he was taken prisoner. He was promoted to lieutenant on 2 March 1710 and served in the expedition to Canada in 1711. On 23 March 1723 he became lieutenant-colonel of the Queen's Regiment, and on 12 August 1741 he was promoted to colonel of the 54th (later 43rd) Regiment of Foot. He transferred to the colonelcy of the 11th Regiment of Foot on 7 February 1746, was promoted to brigadier-general on 18 April 1746, and took part in the raid on Lorient. He died on 29 September 1747.

== Family ==
William Graham was the son of Arthur Graham. His daughter and heir, Alice, married Joshua McGeough, of Drumsill, Co. Armargh, progenitor of the McGough-Bond family of Drumsill.

Military offices
Preceded by Thomas Fowke	Colonel of the 54th Regiment of Foot; 1741–1746	Succeeded by James Kennedy
Preceded by Robinson Sowle	Colonel of the 11th Regiment of Foot; 1746–1747	Succeeded by Maurice Bocland
