= The Leper Well, Gunstone =

The Leper Well
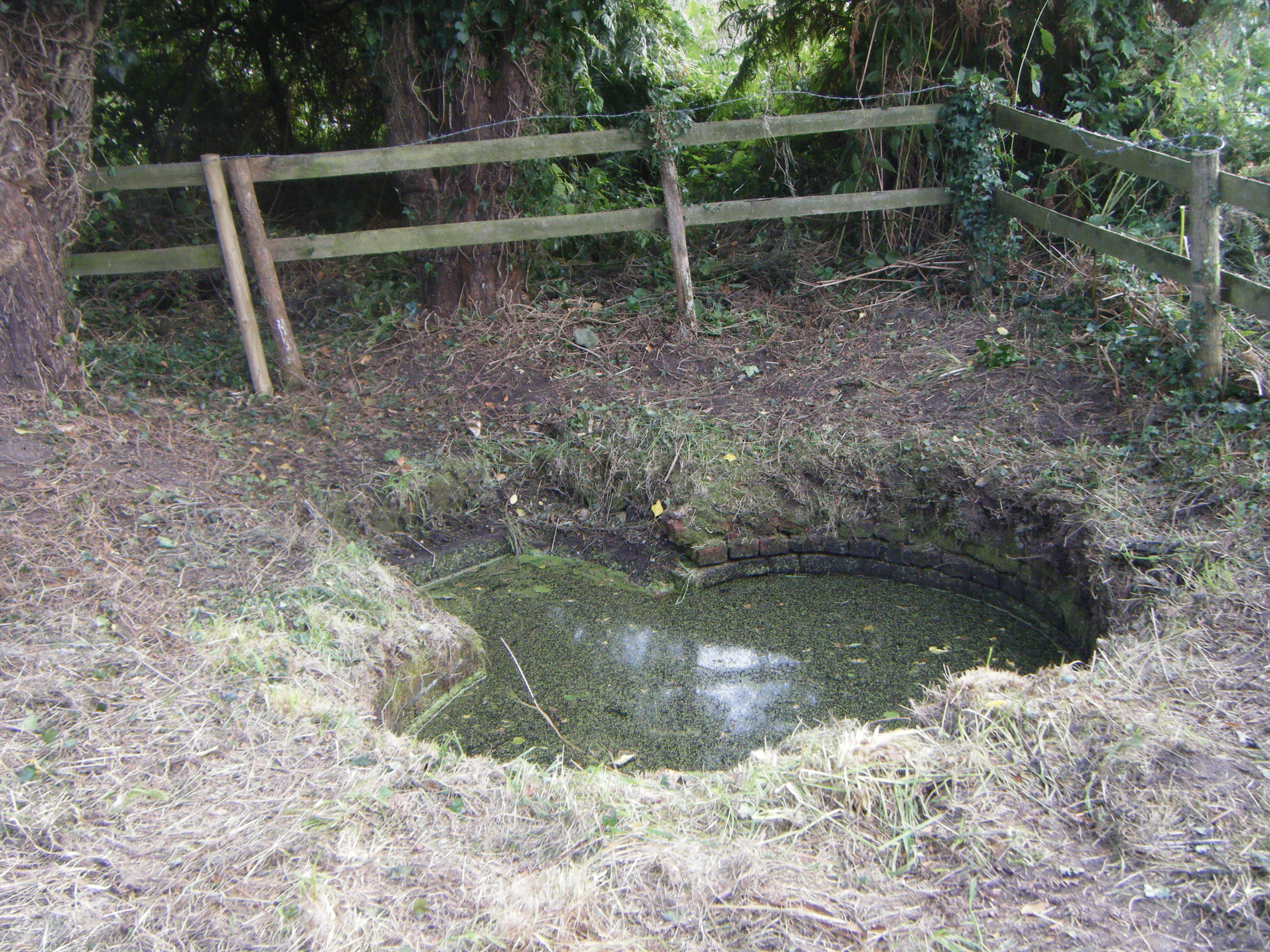
- Location: Gunstone, Staffordshire, England

Scheduled monument
- Official name: Gunstone leper well
- Designated: 17 October 1978
- Reference no.: 1006058

Listed Building – Grade II
- Official name: Walls lining the Leper Well and steps approaching
- Designated: 28 March 1985
- Reference no.: 1180328

The Leper Well, Gunstone is a holy well in the hamlet of Gunstone, Staffordshire. In medieval times, it was believed that the water from the well could cure leprosy.

== History ==
The holy well was described as having medicinal properties in 1686 by Robert Plot, in a publication called The Natural History of Staffordshire. As the well's water is sulphurous, it would have been used as a treatment for not only leprosy, but various skin diseases as well. In the late 17th century, both people and animals were given the water as a remedy for such conditions.

There is a high possibility that there was once a leper hospital in Gunstone, near to the Leper Well. A nearby farmhouse called the Leper House, which is a grade II listed building itself, could potentially have been built either on or near to the site of said leper hospital.

During the 17th century, the water was also used by local people for cooking and brewing.

The bricks lining the well probably date back to the 18th century.

== Traditions ==
According to local tradition, lepers who wished to be cured would first be blessed by the priest at St Nicholas' Church in Codsall, before travelling down the hill to Moat Brook (a nearby stream). After crossing the stream, they would make their way to the Leper Well, in which they would bathe, in the hope of a cure.
