= Henry Addison (VC) =

Recipient of the Victoria Cross

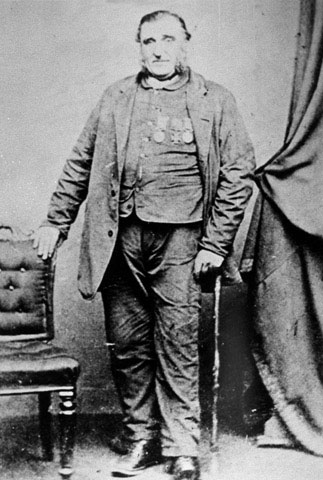
- Born: February 1821; Bardwell, Suffolk
- Died: 18 June 1887 (aged 66); Bardwell
- Burial place: Bardwell Parish Churchyard
- Military career
- Allegiance: United Kingdom
- Branch: British Army
- Rank: Private
- Units: 43rd Regiment of Foot
- Conflicts: Indian Mutiny
- Awards: Victoria Cross

Henry Addison (February 1821 – 18 June 1887) was an English recipient of the Victoria Cross, the highest and most prestigious award for gallantry in the face of the enemy that can be awarded to British and Commonwealth forces. A soldier with the 43rd Regiment of Foot, he was awarded the VC for his actions on 2 January 1859, during the Indian Mutiny.

== Details ==
Born in Bardwell, Suffolk, Addison was about 37 years old, and a private in the 43rd (Monmouthshire) Regiment of Foot (later The Oxfordshire and Buckinghamshire Light Infantry), British Army during the Indian Mutiny when the incident for which he was awarded the VC took place on 2 January 1859 near Kurrereah, India.

On 1 January 1859, 30 men of the 43rd Light Infantry commanded by Gerald Young and contingents from the 1st Madras Regiment and the Royal Artillery left the Brigade at Punneri while the remainder of the Brigade returned to Kotee. The following day after descending a hill the troops saw a village from which smoke was rising and people running from houses into the Jungle. The troops moved into the Jungle and were engaged in action with the enemy for nearly two hours; the enemy was well armed with muskets, bayonets, swords and ammunition. During the action Lieutenant John Osborne attempted to shoot his assailant with a revolver however the attacker was too fast for him. Addison intervened and in an act of great gallantry saved Osborne's life and was severely wounded.

Addison was recommended for the VC in a dispatch from Lieutenant-Colonel F. Gottreux, "commanding Field Detachment, to the Assistant Adjutant General Saugor Field Division on January 15, 1859".

Whilst in the neighbourhood of Kurrereah... chasing retreating mutineers... Lieutenant Osborne, Political Agent of Rewab, was wounded by a sword cut on the right hand. He was at the time he was attacked, closely followed by three men of the 43rd Light Infantry, two men of the artillery being a few paces in front of him. Private Henry Addison, of the 43rd Light Infantry, seeing him attacked and on the ground, rushed forward to defend and cover him in a most gallant manner. In doing this, I much regret having to record, that he received two very severe sword cuts, one on the left leg which rendered immediate amputation of the limb above the knee necessary, and another causing compound fracture of the left fore-arm. The heroism displayed by Private Addison in thus placing himself between Lieutenant Osborne and his assailant at the critical juncture he did, thereby saving that officer's life, may, I hope, be deemed worthy of the Victoria Cross, for which honour I earnestly beg to recommend him.

His injuries were recorded later in the dispatch as follows:

GENERAL RETURN of Casualties at the Engagement at Kurrereah, 2nd January, 1859.

Private Henry Addison (3232): Sword cut on left knee joint; compound fracture of left forearm from sword cut

Dangerously wounded — amputation above the knee performed on the field

His citation was recorded in the London Gazette as follows:

Private Henry Addison. Date of Act of Bravery 2nd January, 1859. For gallant conduct on the 2nd of January, 1859, near Kurrereah, in defending, against a large force, and saving the life of Lieutenant Osborn, Political Agent, who had fallen on the ground wounded. Private Addison received two dangerous wounds, and lost a leg, in this gallant service.

Addison attended Windsor Castle to receive the award of the Victoria Cross and Queen Victoria noticed that he had difficulty in observing the required protocols when retiring from the Monarch's presence and told him to retire in his usual manner. Addison subsequently received a letter from Sir Charles Beaumont Phipps, Keeper of the Privy Purse, referring to the problems Addison had with his wooden leg, advising him that the Queen said he should order an artificial one using her name, which he duly did. She also recommended that he stayed in London until the artificial leg had been made and that it was to his satisfaction.

Gerald Young of the 43rd Light Infantry, whilst describing in his diary the 43rd's march through Central India, during the Indian Mutiny, referred to Addison having had his leg taken off without chloroform and the splendid manner in which he underwent the operation.

Osborne, in gratitude for Addison's selfless act of valour which saved his life, arranged for him to be paid a pension of £20 a year. Addison lived in Bardwell, Suffolk from 1859 and only left there to make his annual visit to Colonel Osborne who died on 8 October 1881.

He was also awarded an Army Long Service and Good Conduct Medal. His Victoria Cross is displayed at the Royal Green Jackets (Rifles) Museum in Winchester, England.

Addison married Charlotte Dixon in India. The only child of the marriage, a son named William, died aged 2 years old, on 8 August 1862. His wife, Charlotte Addison, who remarried after his death, died aged 69, on 30 January 1907.

Henry Addison VC died on 18 June 1887. He is buried in the churchyard of the church of St Peter & St Paul in Bardwell.

== See also ==
- List of Indian Mutiny Victoria Cross recipients

== Sources ==
- The Gorget. Journal of the 1st Green Jackets (43rd and 52nd) 1964
