= Alexander Stewart (British Army officer) =

British army officer

Major-General Alexander Stewart
- Born: c. 1739; Afton, Wigtownshire
- Died: 16 December 1794
- Military career
- Branch: British Army
- Service years: 1755–1794
- Rank: Major-General
- Nickname: United Kingdom
- Conflicts: American Revolutionary War; Battle of Eutaw Springs (WIA); French Revolutionary Wars; Flanders Campaign

Major-General Alexander Stewart (c. 1739 – 16 December 1794) was a Scottish officer in the British Army and a politician.

== Military career ==
Born the second son of John Stewart MP (died 1769) of Castle Stewart, and brother of William Stewart MP, Stewart was commissioned as an ensign in the 37th Regiment of Foot on 8 April 1755. He commanded a field force at Orangeburg and fought at the Battle of Eutaw Springs during the American Revolutionary War. He was appointed lieutenant-colonel of the Third Foot on 7 July 1775; colonel in the army on 16 May 1780; and promoted major-general on 28 April 1790. He was granted the colonelcy of the 2nd (The Queen's Royal) Regiment of Foot on 20 November 1793. He served in the Duke of York's army during the Flanders Campaign, commanding the First Brigade of infantry during the retreat to Holland in 1794. He returned home towards the end of the year and 'fell a sacrifice to an illness contracted in consequence of the fatigues he had undergone', dying 16 December 1794.

He was the member of parliament (MP) for Kirkcudbright Stewartry from 1786 to 1794.

== Sources ==
- Cannon, Richard (1838). Historical Record of the Second, or Queen's Royal Regiment of Foot. London: Clowes and Sons.

Military offices
Preceded by Daniel Jones	Colonel of the 2nd (The Queen's Royal) Regiment of Foot; 1793–1794	Succeeded by James Coates
Parliament of the United Kingdom
Preceded by Peter Johnston	member of parliament for Kirkcudbright Stewartry; 1786–1794	Succeeded by Patrick Heron
