= Daniel Jones (British Army officer) =

Lieutenant-General Daniel Jones
- Born: c.1725 Cumberland
- Died: 20 November 1793; Combe, Surrey
- Burial place: All Saints, Sanderstead
- Military career
- Allegiance: Great Britain
- Branch: British Army
- Service years: 1749–1793
- Rank: Lieutenant-General
- Conflicts: American Revolutionary War

Lieutenant-General Daniel Jones (c.1725 – 20 November 1793) was a British Army officer who became colonel of the 2nd (The Queen's Royal) Regiment of Foot.

== Military career ==
Jones became a lieutenant in the 3rd Foot Guards in 1749. Promoted to major-general in 1777, he fought in the American Revolutionary War. He went on to be colonel of the 2nd (The Queen's Royal) Regiment of Foot on 12 August 1777.

== Sources ==
- Cannon, Richard (1838). Historical Record of the Second, or Queen's Royal Regiment of Foot. London: Clowes and Sons.

Military offices
Preceded by Sir Charles Montagu	Colonel of the 2nd (The Queen's Royal) Regiment of Foot; 1777–1794	Succeeded by Alexander Stewart
