= James Coates (British Army officer) =

General James Coates
- Born: December 1739; Overton, North Yorkshire
- Died: 22 July 1822; Heslington, North Yorkshire
- Military career
- Allegiance: United Kingdom
- Branch: British Army
- Rank: General
- Conflicts: American Revolutionary War; Flanders Campaign

General James Coates (December 1739 – 22 July 1822) was a British Army officer who became colonel of the 2nd (The Queen's Royal) Regiment of Foot.

== Military career ==
Coates was commissioned as an ensign in the 19th Regiment of Foot on 25 December 1755. He commanded his regiment at the Battle of Monck's Corner in April 1780 and at the Siege of Ninety-Six in May 1781 during the American Revolutionary War and commanded a brigade during the Flanders Campaign. He went on to be colonel of the 2nd (The Queen's Royal) Regiment of Foot on 20 December 1794.

== Family ==
James Coates was the first son of Reverend John Coates and Margaret Reeves and was born in Overton, near York. On the 5 May 1763, he married Catherine Darley (daughter of Richard Darley, Lord of the manor of Bishop Wilton). She died shortly after the birth of their son, Major James Richard Coates, of the 69th Regiment of Foot (20 May 1767 - October 1811). James Coates also had an illegitimate son (with Maria Johnson) William Henry Coates Esq. (15 August 1785 - 31 July 1857), a gentleman and timber merchant from Leeds.

== Sources ==
- Cannon, Richard (1838). Historical Record of the Second, or Queen's Royal Regiment of Foot. London: Clowes and Sons.

Military offices
Preceded by Alexander Stewart	Colonel of the 2nd (The Queen's Royal) Regiment of Foot; 1794–1822	Succeeded by Sir Henry Torrens
