= Thomas Fowke =

British military officer

Lieutenant-General Thomas Fowke
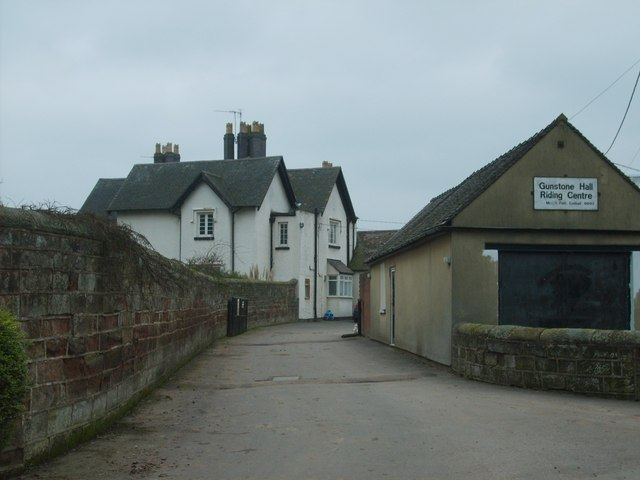
- Fowke family home, Gunstone Hall
- Born: c. 1690; Gunstone, South Staffordshire
- Died: 29 March 1765; Bath, Somerset
- Military career
- Service years: 1702–1756
- Rank: Lieutenant-General
- Commands: Governor of Gibraltar 1753–1756
- Conflicts: War of the Spanish Succession; Almenar; Battle of Saragossa; Battle of Villaviciosa; War of the Austrian Succession; Jacobite rising of 1745; Battle of Prestonpans; Seven Years' War

Lieutenant-General Thomas Fowke (or Foulks; c. 1690 – 29 March 1765) was a British Army officer from South Staffordshire. He was court-martialled twice, first in 1745 after Prestonpans, then as Governor of Gibraltar for his part in the 1756 Battle of Minorca, a defeat that led to the execution of Admiral John Byng.

Despite limited responsibility, Fowke was originally sentenced to nine months suspension, but George II insisted on his dismissal from the army. He was reinstated as Lieutenant General following the accession of George III in 1761 and died in Bath, Somerset in March 1765.

Fowke's great-uncle emigrated to Virginia in 1651, and was closely related to George Mason, 1725 to 1792, one of the Founding Fathers of the United States. Mason built Gunston Hall, named after the family home in Gunstone, which is now an historic monument.

== Personal details ==
Thomas Fowke was the elder son of Thomas Fowke of Gunstone, South Staffordshire, and his second wife Mary. He was twice married, first to Elizabeth Ingoldsby, with whom he had a daughter, and following her death, to Dorothea Randall; they had two children.

== Career ==
Fowke began his military career in 1702 during the War of the Spanish Succession as an Ensign in Nicholas Lepell's Regiment of Foot. He became captain in June 1707, Peregrine Lascelles, who later served with him in the 1745 Rising, being a colleague. In 1710, Lepell's was posted to Spain, but despite victories at Almenar and Saragossa, suffered heavy casualties in the defeat at Villaviciosa in December. Lepell, by then the senior British officer in Catalonia, reported losses of 107 men after the battle.

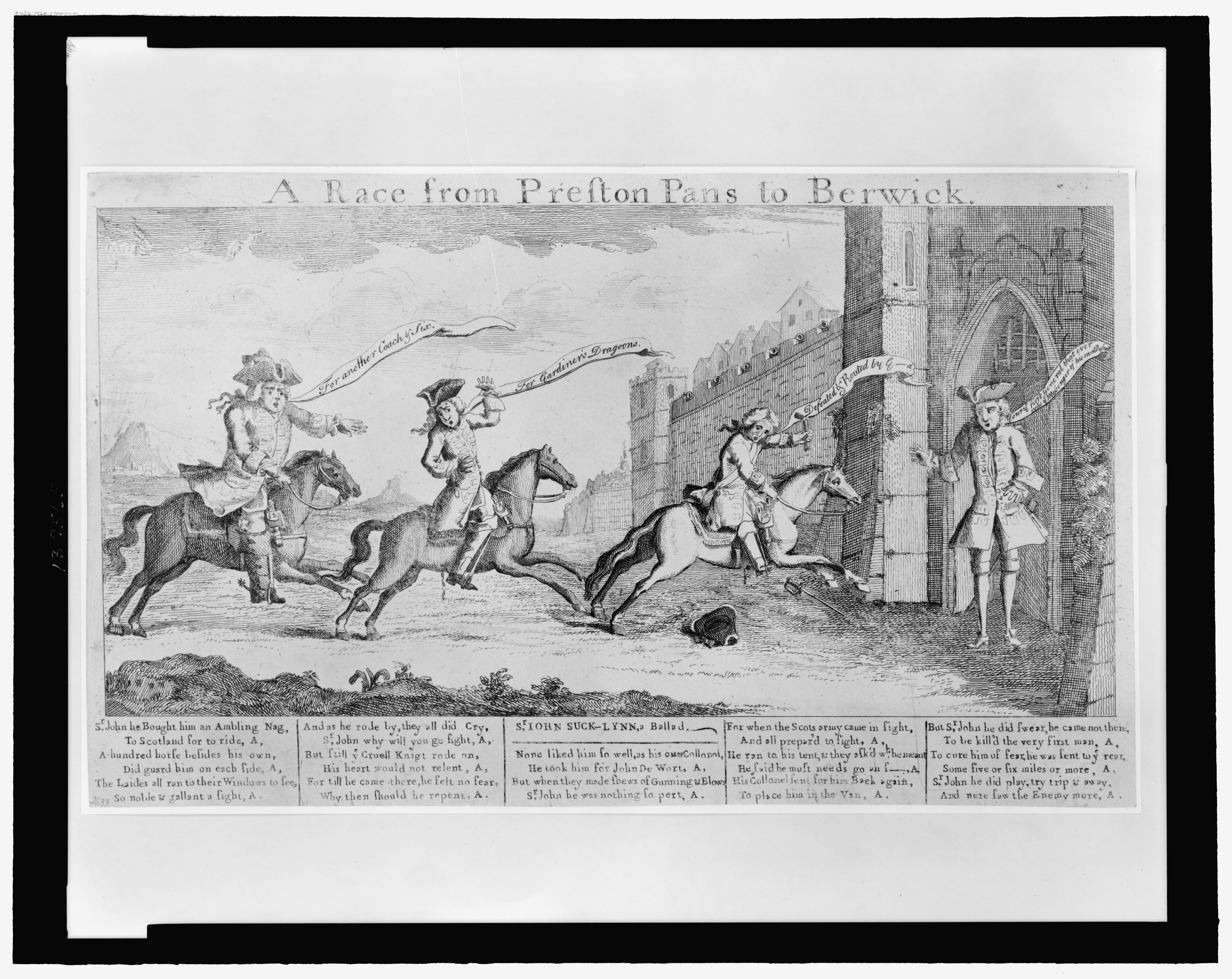
Cartoon showing Sir John Cope arriving at Berwick after Prestonpans

Villaviciosa ended the campaign in Spain, and Lepells was disbanded in November 1712 as the army was reduced prior to the 1713 Peace of Utrecht. Fowke managed to retain his commission, transferring into Whetham's, later 27th Foot, before joining Cotton's Foot in 1716 as a Major. In June 1722, he became Lieutenant-Colonel of Kerr's Dragoons.

Following the outbreak of the War of the Austrian Succession in 1740, Fowke was promoted to Colonel of the 43rd Foot. He exchanged into the Queen's Royal Regiment, then based in Scotland, and was promoted Brigadier General in June 1745, three months before the Jacobite rising of 1745. He served as deputy to Sir John Cope, military commander in Scotland, at Prestonpans in September, where their army collapsed in a battle lasting less than 15 minutes. Fowke's two regiments of dragoons fled without firing a shot, and halted only when they reached Berwick-upon-Tweed. He, Cope and Lascelles were later tried by a court-martial in 1746, and although all three were exonerated, Cope never held command again.

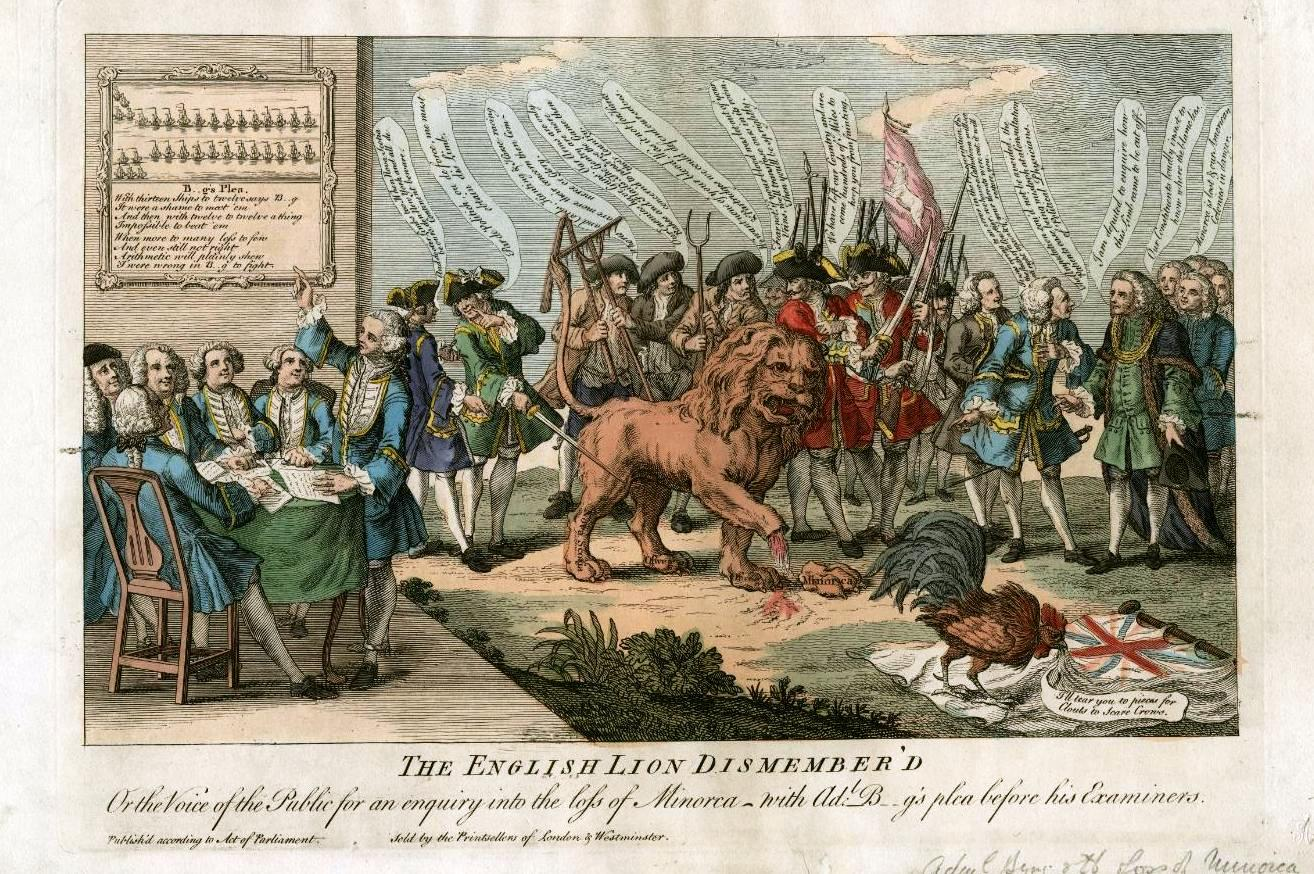
Cartoon showing the popular hysteria provoked by defeat at Minorca; Byng was executed in March 1757, Fowke dismissed

Fowke was posted to Flanders and became a Major General in 1747, shortly before the 1748 Treaty of Aix-la-Chapelle followed by his appointment as Governor of Gibraltar in 1752. The opening action of the Seven Years' War was the British naval defeat at Minorca in June 1756, an event that led to the trial and execution of Admiral John_Byng.

Fowke was also court martialled for allegedly refusing to provide Byng with soldiers from the Gibraltar garrison. He was originally sentenced to nine months suspension, but George II insisted he be dismissed. Contemporaries felt he and Byng had been unfairly singled out, a 1757 Parliamentary committee noting the poor state of the island's defences, with over 35 senior officers absent from their posts, including the governor and colonels of all four regiments in its garrison.

This ended Fowke's career, although George III reinstated his rank in 1761. He died in Bath, Somerset in March 1765.

== Legacy ==
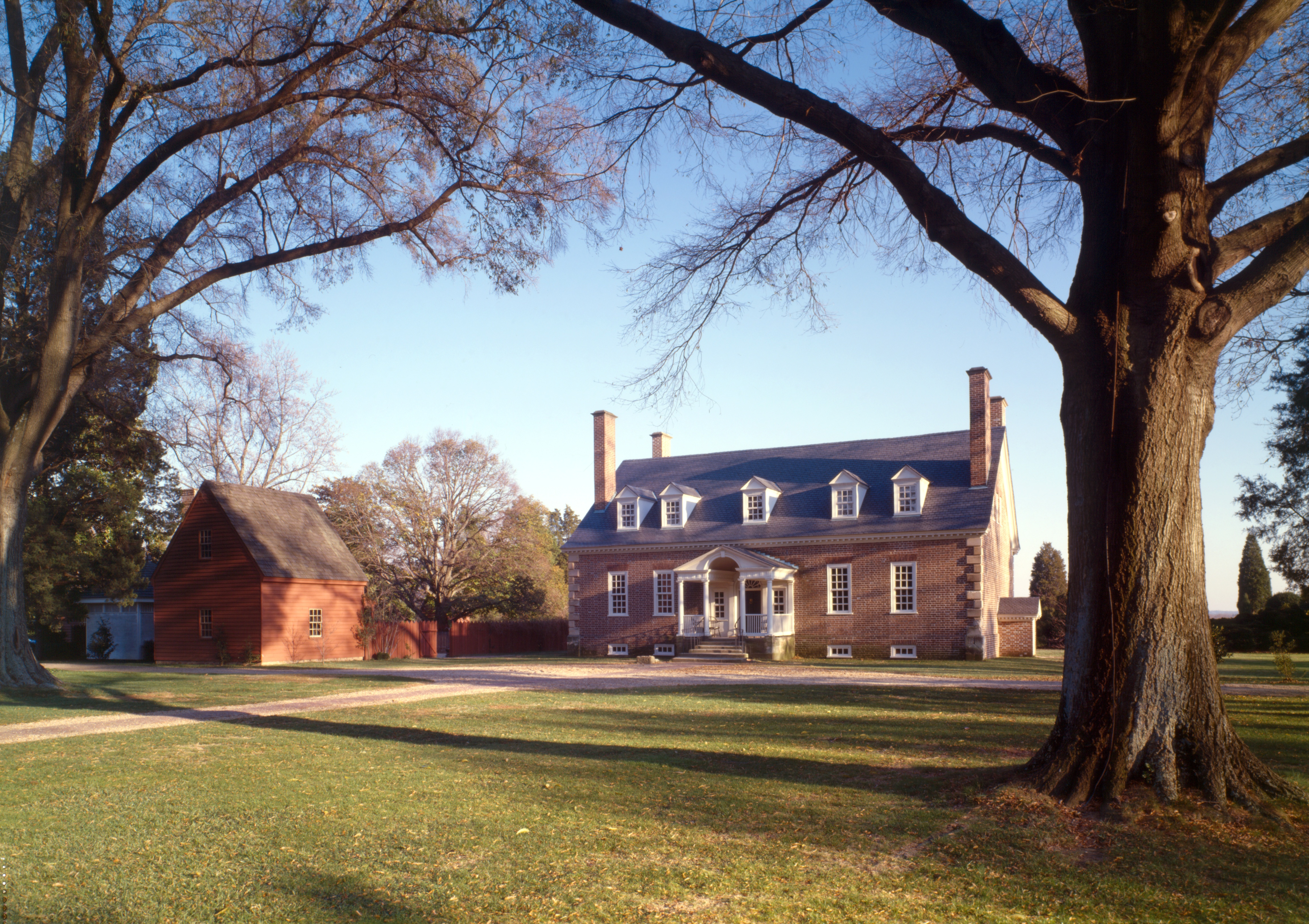
Gunston Hall, Virginia, named after Fowke's family home

In 1651, Thomas Fowke's great-uncle Gerard moved to Virginia, along with his cousin, Philip Mason; one of their descendants was George Mason (1725–1792), a US Founding Father. In 1755, he commemorated his family roots by building a new house in Virginia named Gunston Hall; in 1923, another Mason built a second Gunston Hall, in North Carolina.

Fowke's personal papers for the period 1752 to 1755, including his time as Governor of Gibraltar, were acquired by in 2015 by the Lewis Walpole Library, part of Yale University.

After his retirement, he lived near Park Hill, Yorkshire, now the site of the Park Hill estate, Sheffield, which was given listed building status in 1998.

== Sources ==
- Adjutant General's Office (1842). Historical Records of the British Army; History of the 13th Light Dragoons. John W Parker.
- Blaikie, Walter Biggar, ed. (1916). Publications of the Scottish History Society (Volume Series 2, Volume 2 (March, 1916) 1737–1746). Scottish History Society.
- Cannon, Richard (1837). Historical Record of the Second, Or Queen's Royal Regiment of Foot. William Clowes.
- Dalton, Charles (1903). English army lists and commission registers, 1661–1714 Volume V. Eyre and Spottiswood.
- Dalton, Charles (1904). English army lists and commission registers, 1661–1714 Volume VI. Eyre and Spottiswood.
- Debrett (1792). History, Debates & Proceedings of Parliament 1743–1774; Volume III. Debrett.
- La Raia, Jackie (12 September 2013). "George Mason's Gunston Hall". Gunston Hall Blog (Virginia).
- Leslie, JH (1916). Notes and Queries, 12th Series, Volume II. Frank Chance.
- "Papers of Lieutenant-General Thomas Fowke". Lewis Walpole Library. 2 August 2016.
- Regan, Geoffrey (2000). Brassey's Book of Naval Blunders. Brassey's.
- Tumath, Andrew (2013). "The British Army in Catalonia after the Battle of Brihuega 1710–1712". Journal of the Society for Army Historical Research. 91 (367): 182–205. JSTOR 44232207.

Government offices
Preceded by Humphrey Bland	Governor of Gibraltar; 1753–1756	Succeeded by Lord Tyrawley
Military offices
Preceded by None	Colonel of Thomas Fowke's Regiment of Foot; 1741	Succeeded by William Graham
Preceded by Percy Kirke	Colonel of The Queen's Own Royal Regiment of Foot; 1741–1755	Succeeded by John Fitzwilliam
Preceded by Edward Braddock	Colonel of the 14th Regiment of Foot; 1755–1756	Succeeded by Charles Jeffereys
