= Bardwell, Suffolk =

Village in Suffolk, England

Coordinates: 52.317°N 0.85°E

Bardwell
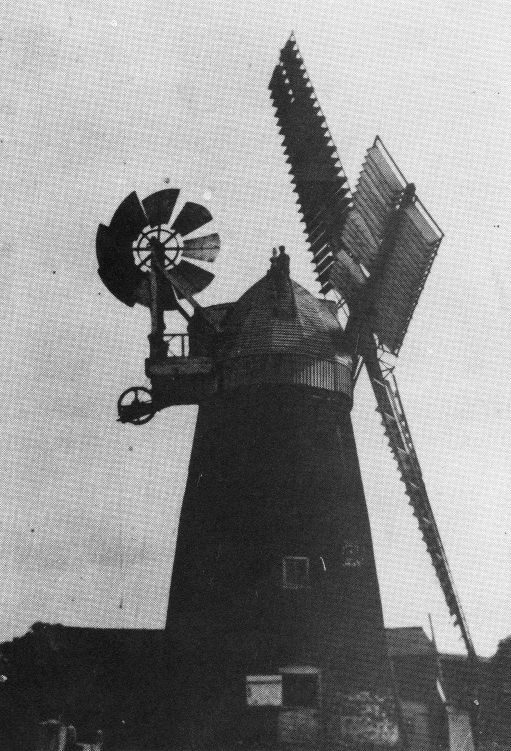
- Bardwell Windmill

- Location within Suffolk
- Interactive map of Bardwell
- Population: 785 (2011 census)
- District: West Suffolk
- Shire county: Suffolk
- Region: East
- Country: England
- Sovereign state: United Kingdom
- Post town: BURY ST. EDMUNDS
- Postcode district: IP31
- Dialling code: 01359
- UK Parliament: Bury St Edmunds and Stowmarket

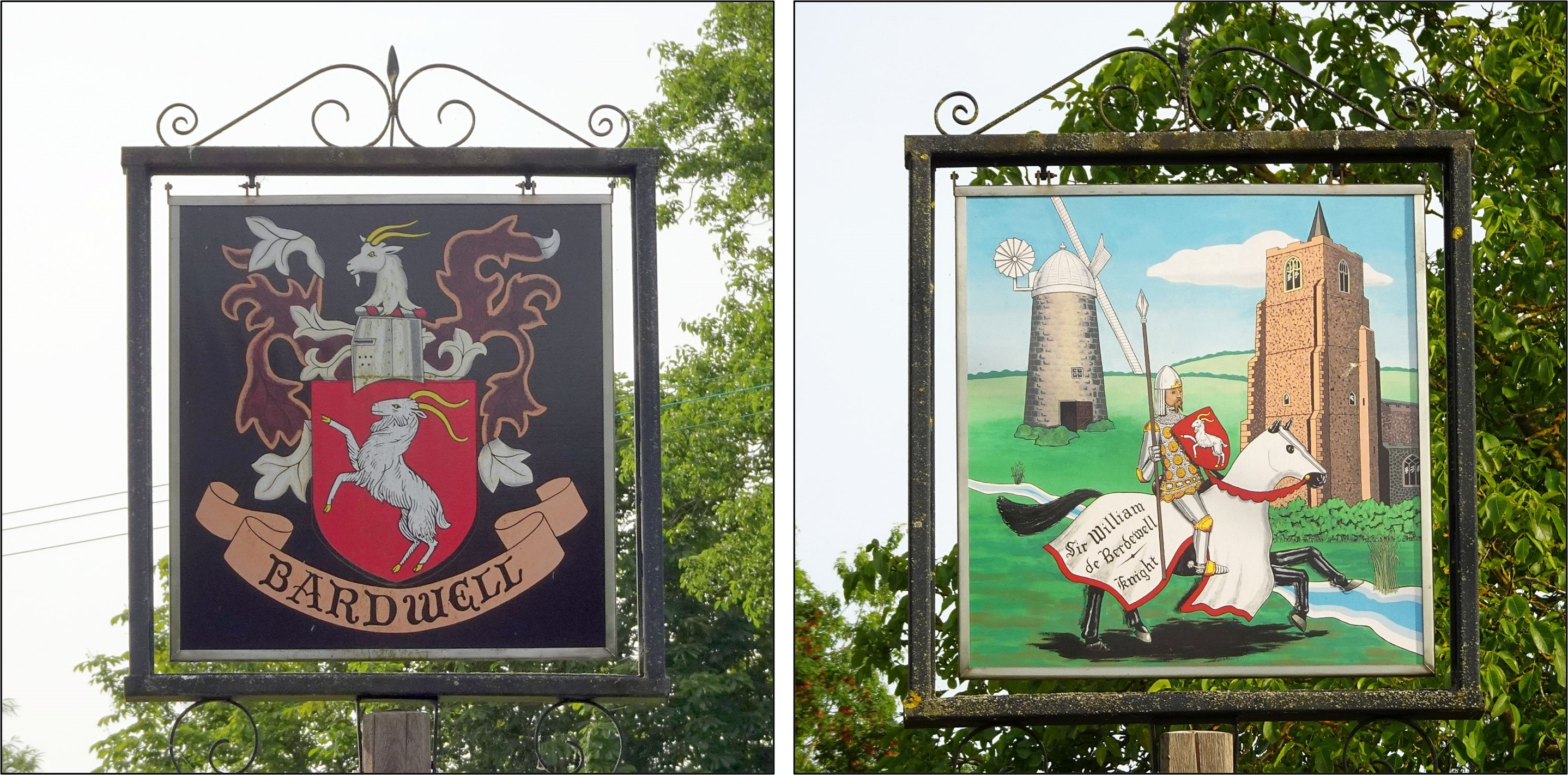
The two sides of Bardwell Village Sign

Bardwell is a village and civil parish in the West Suffolk district of Suffolk, England.

== Location ==
Bardwell is located about ten miles north-east of Bury St Edmunds between the villages of Ixworth, Stanton and Honington.

== History ==
The Domesday Book records the population of Bardwell in 1086 to be 86. The River Blackbourne passes about half a mile west of the village. According to Eilert Ekwall the meaning of the village name is "Bearda's Spring" or brim/bank of spring.

Until the 20th century there were two working mills in Bardwell, a watermill and a windmill. The watermill has been converted into a house whilst the windmill which is a tower mill, built in 1829 was in the process of restoration to a working mill again which has recently been completed.

== Church ==
Bardwell has many old buildings including its medieval parish church. In the churchyard is the grave of Henry Addison, born in Bardwell in 1821 he joined the British Army and won the Victoria Cross for his heroic actions in the Indian Mutiny. He returned safely to Bardwell and died in 1887 aged 66 years.

There are eight bells that hang the church of St Peter and Paul, contrary the pub name of the six bells in the village, with the largest weighing 11cwt – 2qr – 27lb. The oldest bell, being the 7th, was cast in 1713 by Thomas Newman. They were restored and two new bells added in 2009 by Hayward Mills.

Bardwell Church St. Peter and Paul was built by Sir William Bardwell.

== Amenities ==
Amenities within the village of Bardwell include a post office and two pubs (the Dun Cow and the Six Bells). As in many village communities volunteer groups manage Bardwell Playing Field and the Tithe Barn which is the village hall both are used for village events. An engineering company, a marketing company and two equine centres are based in Bardwell. There is a primary school, Bardwell Church of England VC Primary School located in School Lane.

== Notable residents ==
- Henry Addison VC
- John Cavell
- Richard FitzLewis
- Sir Bassingbourne Gawdy
- Kenneth Carlisle
- Frank Heilgers
