= Frederick Augustus Smith =

Recipient of the Victoria Cross

Frederick Augustus Smith VC
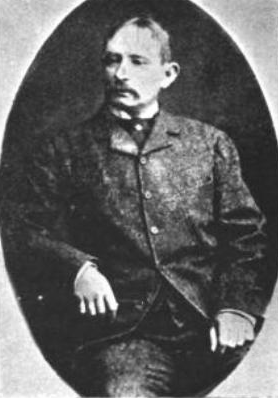
- Born: 18 November 1826; Dublin, Ireland
- Died: 22 July 1887 (aged 60); Duleek, County Meath, Ireland
- Military career
- Allegiance: United Kingdom
- Branch: (United Kingdom of Great Britain and Ireland) British Army
- Service years: 1849–1878
- Rank: Lieutenant colonel
- Commands: 43rd (Monmouthshire) Regiment of Foot (1875–1878)
- Conflicts: Crimean War; New Zealand Wars
- Awards: Victoria Cross; Mentioned in dispatches

Lieutenant Colonel Frederick Augustus Smith VC (18 November 1826 – 22 July 1887) was a British Army officer and an Irish recipient of the Victoria Cross, the highest award for gallantry in the face of the enemy that can be awarded to British and Commonwealth forces.

== Early life and career ==
Born in Dublin on 18 November 1826, Smith was commissioned as an ensign into the 1st Regiment of Foot (Royal Scots) on 1 January 1849. He was promoted to lieutenant on 30 April 1852. He saw action during the Crimean War at Alma, Inkerman and Sebastopol and was promoted to captain on 30 March 1855. He later transferred to the 43rd (Monmouthshire) Regiment of Foot.

== Victoria Cross ==
Smith was 37 years old, and a captain in the 43rd (Monmouthshire) Regiment of Foot (later the Oxfordshire and Buckinghamshire Light Infantry), during the Waikato-Hauhau Maori War in New Zealand.

The 68th (Durham) Regiment of Foot (Light Infantry) with a detachment of the 43rd commanded by Smith was deployed to attack an entrenchment held by the Māori. The following deed took place during the attack on 21 June 1864 at Tauranga for which he was awarded the VC.

For his distinguished conduct during the engagement at Tauranga, on the 21st of June. He is stated to have led on his Company in the most gallant manner at the attack on the Maories' position, and, although wounded previously to reaching the Rifle Pits, to have jumped down into them, where he commenced a hand to hand encounter with the Enemy, thereby giving his men great encouragement, and setting them a fine example.

In the charge he was struck by a bullet which lodged in the upper part of his leg. He continued to lead his men and was the first man into the entrenchment. Following fierce fighting, the Māori having sustained heavy casualties were driven from their position. In the attack Smith killed one of the Māori Chiefs and took possession of his baton known as a Mere. The Chief's family subsequently offered substantial sums of money to retrieve the Mere. After Smith's death the Mere was eventually returned to a museum in New Zealand; a relic of the British Army's wars in that country.

He was also mentioned in dispatches.

== Later career ==
He later achieved the rank of lieutenant colonel. He commanded the 43rd Foot from 1 December 1875 to 2 February 1878 when he retired from the army.

He died in Duleek, County Meath, 22 July 1887. His grave (unmarked) is in Duleek (Church of Ireland) Churchyard, County Meath. A memorial plaque to him, originally in Duleek Church, is now situated in Kilmore Church, standing in the Ulster Folk and Transport Museum, Cultra, County Down.

It was Norman and Eileen Irvine and their son David (Irish Guards) from Carrickfergus, County Antrim who rescued the marble plaque from ruin in the Duleek church. The Ox and Bucks regiment wished to have it but it was decided to have it stay in Ireland.
