= Queen's Royal Regiment (West Surrey) =

Infantry regiment of the British Army

Queen's (Royal West Surrey) Regiment Queen's Royal Regiment (West Surrey)
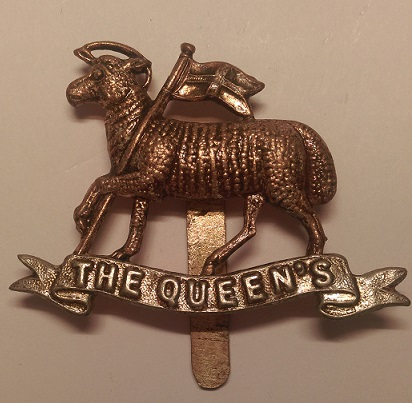
- Queen's Royal Regiment (West Surrey) Cap Badge
- Active: 14 October 1661–14 October 1959
- Country: England (1661–1707); Great Britain (1707–1800); United Kingdom (1801–1959)
- Branch: English Army (1661–1707); British Army (1707–1959)
- Type: Infantry
- Role: Line infantry
- Size: 1–2 Regular battalions 1 Militia/Special Reserve battalion 2 Volunteer and up to 9 Territorial battalions Up to 13 New Army and war service battalions
- Part of: Home Counties Brigade
- Garrison/HQ: Stoughton Barracks, Guildford
- Nicknames: Kirke's Lambs, The Mutton Lancers
- Mottos: Pristinae Virtutis Memor (Mindful of Former Valour); Vel Exuviae Triumphans (Even in Defeat Triumphant)
- March: Quick: We'll Gang Nai Mair to Yon Toon (Braganza); Slow: Scipio
- Anniversaries: Glorious First of June (1 June); Salerno (9 September)

The Queen's Royal Regiment (West Surrey) was a line infantry regiment of the English and later the British Army from 1661 to 1959. It was the senior English line infantry regiment of the British Army, behind only the Royal Scots in the British Army line infantry order of precedence. (Note: The Foot Guards regiments rank higher in precedence than Line Infantry regiments, even if they are not as old.) Raised from New Model Army veterans to garrison Tangier, it later served in every major war involving the British Army up to World War II.

In 1959, the regiment was amalgamated with the East Surrey Regiment, to form a single county regiment called the Queen's Royal Surrey Regiment which was, on 31 December 1966, amalgamated with the Queen's Own Buffs, The Royal Kent Regiment, the Royal Sussex Regiment and the Middlesex Regiment (Duke of Cambridge's Own) to form the Queen's Regiment. Following a further amalgamation in 1992 with the Royal Hampshire Regiment, the lineage of the regiment is continued today by the Princess of Wales's Royal Regiment (Queen's and Royal Hampshires).

== Titles ==
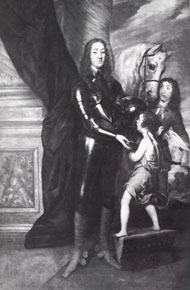
Lord Peterborough, the regiment's founder

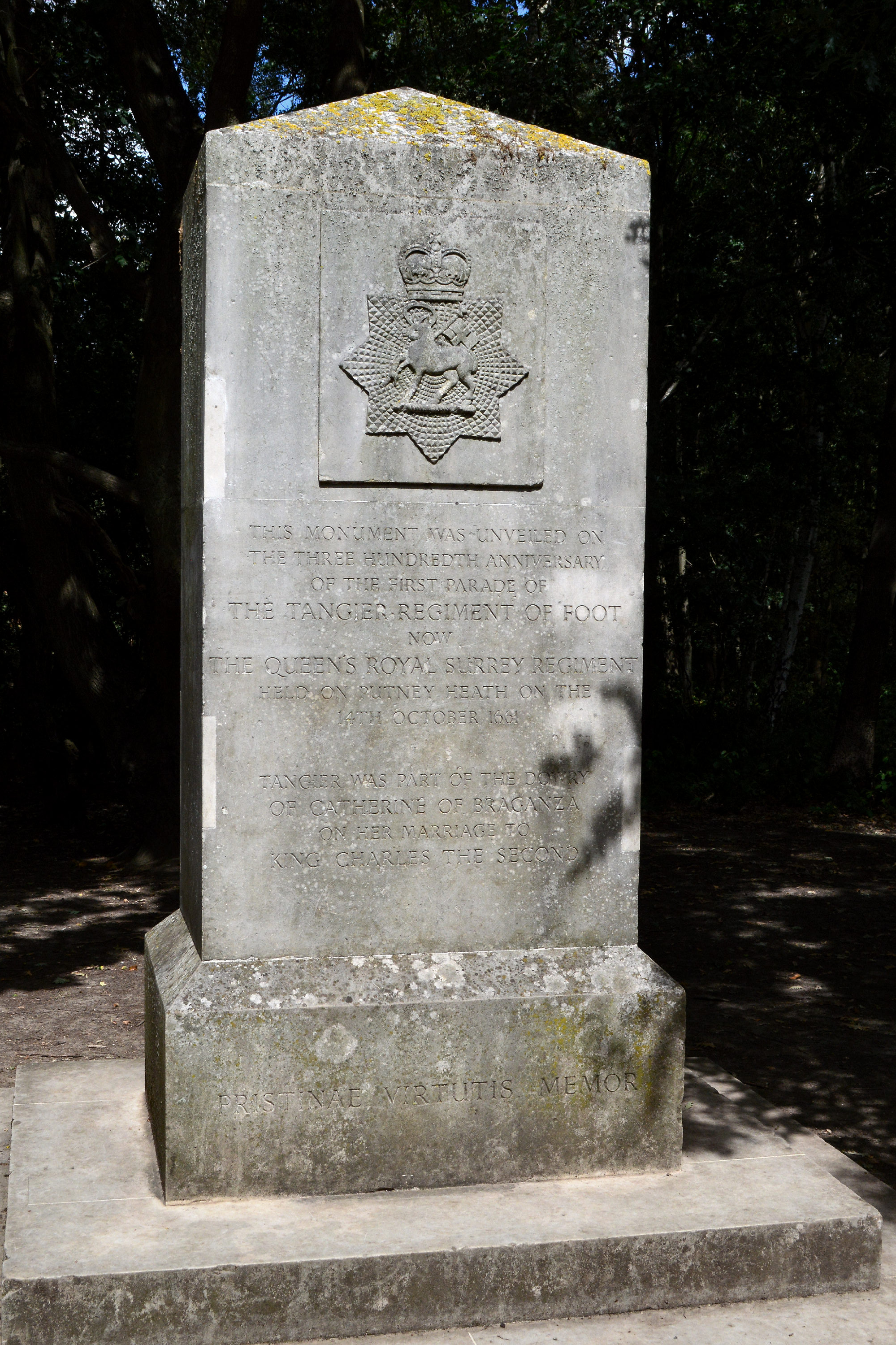
The commemorative stone erected at Putney Heath on the 300th anniversary of the raising of the regiment, 14 October 1961: subsequent restorations have added (on the rear face) the titles and badges of the other regiments merged into the present Princess of Wales's Royal Regiment.

The regiment was raised from disbanded men of the New Model Army on 14 October 1661 by Henry Mordaunt, 2nd Earl of Peterborough as The Earl of Peterborough's Regiment of Foot on Putney Heath (then in Surrey). It was formed specifically to garrison the new English acquisition of Tangier, part of Catherine of Braganza's dowry when she married King Charles II. From this service, it was also known as the Tangier Regiment. As was usual at the time, it was also named after its current colonel, from one of whom, Percy Kirke, it acquired its nickname Kirke's Lambs. In 1663 it absorbed two other regiments that had originally been raised from ex-Royalist troops to garrison Dunkirk: Sir Robert Harley's and Lord Rutherfurd's. It also formed a short-lived 2nd Battalion (also known as the Deputy Governor's Regiment) from Fitzgerald's Irish Regiment from Dunkirk. It was withdrawn along with the rest of the Tangier Garrison when Charles II abandoned the colony in 1684.

In 1685, it was given the Royal title the Queen Dowager's Regiment of Foot (after Queen Catherine, widow of Charles II) and in 1703 became The Queen's Royal Regiment of Foot. In 1715, it was renamed The Princess of Wales's Own Regiment of Foot after Caroline of Ansbach, then Princess of Wales, and was re-designated The Queen's Own Regiment of Foot in 1727 when the Princess became Queen. It was ranked as 2nd Foot in the clothing regulations of 1747, and was renamed 2nd (The Queen's Royal) Regiment of Foot by Royal warrant in 1751.

In the Childers reforms of 1881 it became the county regiment of West Surrey, named The Queen's (Royal West Surrey) Regiment. In 1921, its title was slightly altered to The Queen's Royal Regiment (West Surrey). By 1950 it was known as The Queen's Royal Regiment. In 1959, it was amalgamated with the East Surrey Regiment, to form the Queen's Royal Surrey Regiment.

== History ==
=== Early years ===
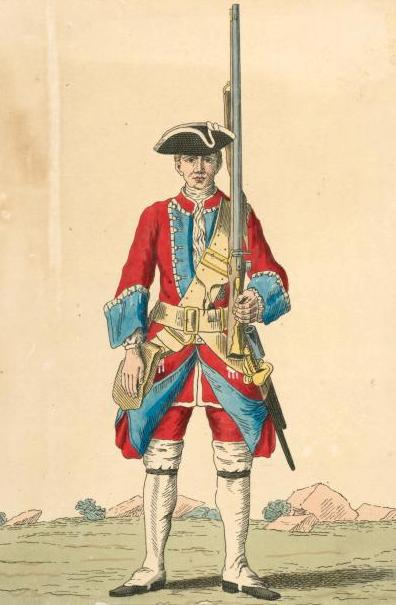
A regimental private in c. 1742

c. 1751 painting of a regimental grenadier (centre)

The regiment was shipped to Tangier where it remained until the port was evacuated in 1684, when it returned to England. It took part in the suppression of the Monmouth Rebellion, fighting at the Battle of Sedgemoor, where it earned a widespread (but probably exaggerated) reputation for brutality. After the Glorious Revolution, it fought in Ireland for the new king, William III, defending the besieged Derry in 1689 and at the Battle of the Boyne in 1690. From 1692 to 1696 it fought in Flanders in the Nine Years' War, at the Battle of Landen and the recapture of Namur in 1695.

During the War of Spanish Succession it served in the Iberian campaign, at Cadiz, Vigo, the sieges of Valencia de Alcantara, Alburquerque, Badajoz, Alcantara and Ciudad Rodrigo, and was virtually destroyed in the disastrous Battle of Almansa. In the campaign in the Low Countries in 1703, it defended Tongres against overwhelming odds, giving Lord Overkirk time to re-group his forces, until it was eventually captured. It was for this action that it was awarded its Royal title and its mottoes. It spent most of the remainder of the 18th century on garrison duty, being one of the regiments involved in putting down the Gordon Riots.

=== French and Napoleonic Wars ===
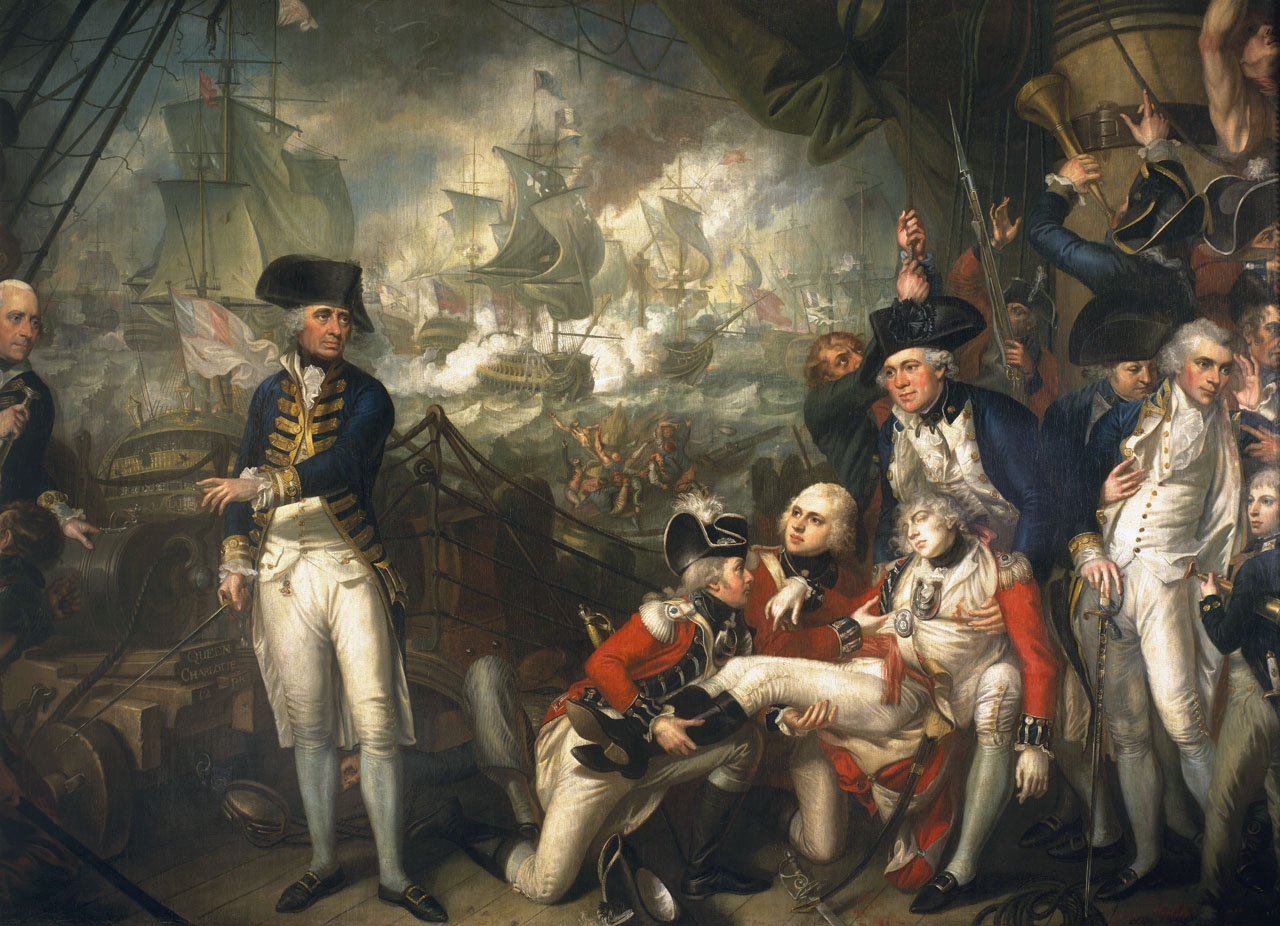
Lord Howe on the Deck of the Queen Charlotte by Mather Brown, 1794. Officers of the regiment are seen on the right.

On the outbreak of the French Revolutionary Wars, detachments were in the West Indies and acting as marines in the Channel Fleet, notably at the battle of the Glorious First of June in 1794, where they served on Howe's flagship, Queen Charlotte and also on board Russell, Defence, Royal George and Majestic. In recognition of the regiment's service, it was granted the distinction of wearing a Naval Crown superscribed 1 June 1794 on its colours.

The regiment was then reunited and sent to the West Indies where it took part in the capture of Guadeloupe in 1794, although the occupation was short-lived owing to outbreaks of disease, particularly yellow fever, among the troops, and the capture of Trinidad in 1797. A second battalion was formed in 1795 and stationed in Guernsey before being shipped to Martinique, where it was disbanded in 1797, its personnel being absorbed by 1st Battalion.

The regiment was transferred to Ireland in 1798 where it helped put down the Irish rebellion and then took part in the unsuccessful 1799 Anglo-Russian invasion of Holland. In 1800, it was part of the abortive expedition to Belle Isle, from which it sailed to Egypt where it fought at the Battle of Alexandria, the Siege of Fort Julien and the Siege of Alexandria.

During the Napoleonic Wars, the regiment first fought in the Peninsular War at the battles of Vimeiro and Corunna. It then took part in the disastrous Walcheren Campaign before returning to the Peninsula to fight at the Battle of Fuentes de Oñoro, the second Siege of Ciudad Rodrigo, the Battle of Salamanca and the unsuccessful Siege of Burgos. By the winter of 1812, the regiment was so depleted by casualties and disease that four companies were amalgamated with the equally weakened 2nd Battalion, 53rd Foot, to form the 2nd Provisional Battalion. Six cadre companies returned home to re-form. As part of the 4th Division, the Provisional Battalion took part in the Wellington's triumph at the Battle of Vittoria on 21 June 1813, followed by the Siege of San Sebastián and, 1814, the battles of Orthes and Toulouse.

=== The Victorian era ===
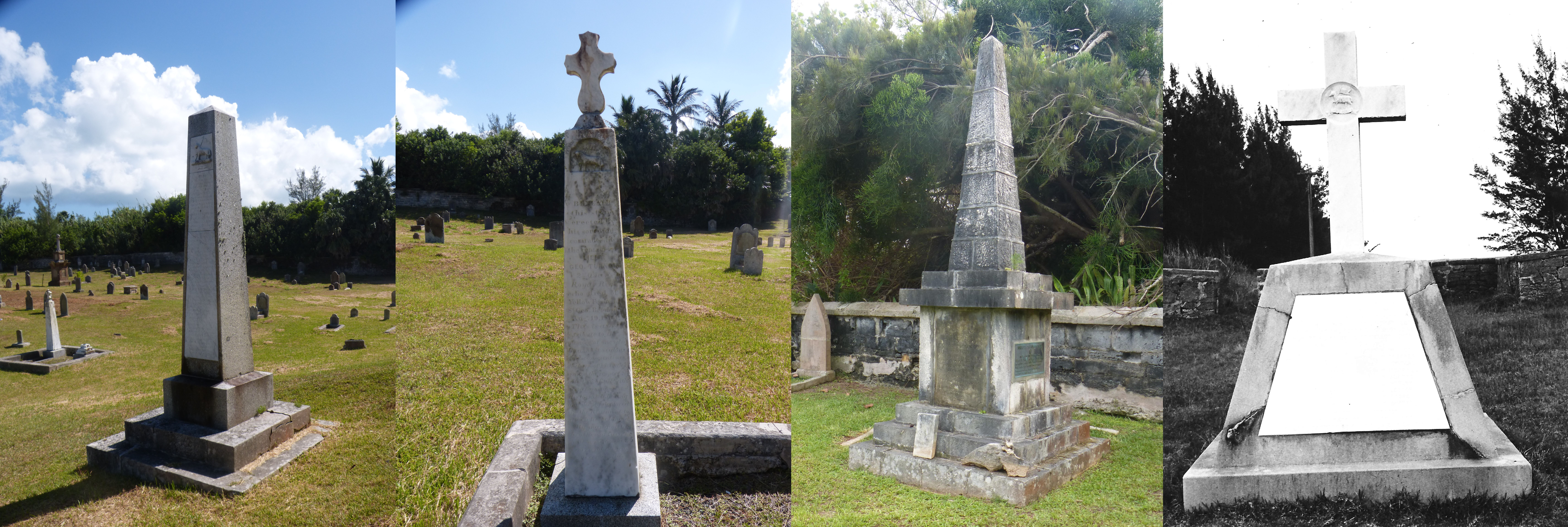
1864–1866 memorials to the dead of the 2nd Battalion 2nd (Queen's) Regiment in Bermuda

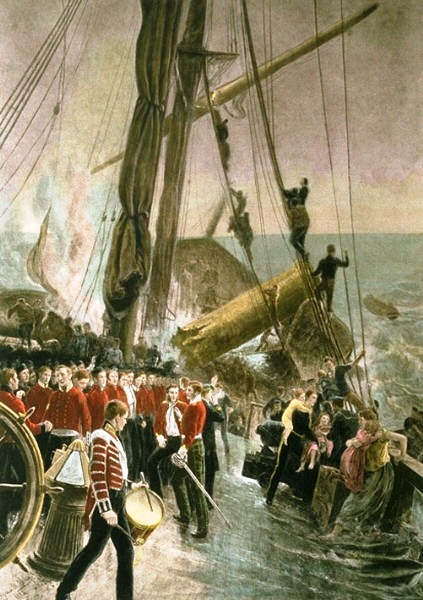
The Wreck of the Birkenhead (c. 1892) by Thomas Hemy

The regiment was on garrison duty in Baluchistan when the First Afghan War broke out in 1839. It formed part of the force that attacked the previously impregnable city of Ghazni, taking the city by storm because the army lacked siege equipment, and opening the way to Kabul. It returned to India in November 1839, storming the city of Khelat en route, and avoiding destruction along with the rest of Elphinstone's army.

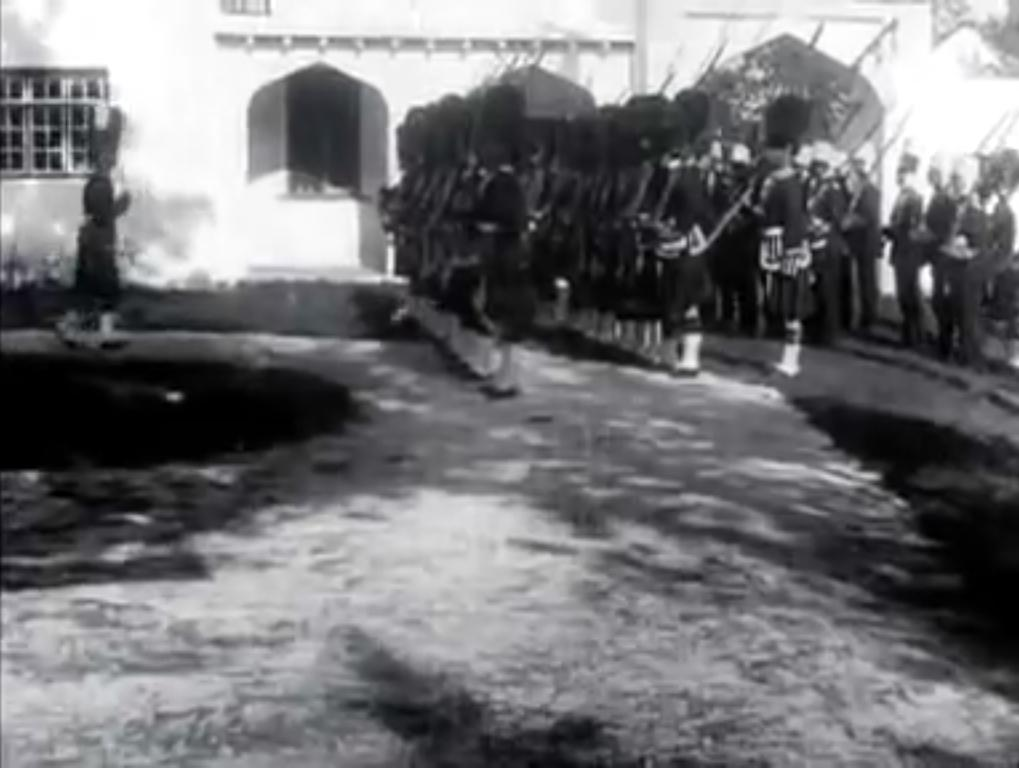
Soldiers from the 2nd Battalion, based in Bermuda, playing the role of Scottish Highland infantry in the 1912 film "The Relief of Lucknow"

The regiment was shipped to the Cape Colony during the Eighth Xhosa War in 1851. On 25 February 1852 a detachment of 51 men under the command of Ensign Boyland were aboard HMS Birkenhead travelling from Simon's Town to Port Elizabeth when the ship struck rocks. The troops were assembled on deck and remained at attention to afford the embarked women and children time to take their place in the lifeboats. Shortly after this the ship broke up and the vast majority of the troops on board were either drowned or fell victim to sharks. The bravery of the troops, made up of cadres from ten different regiments, led to the naming of the Birkenhead Drill. It once again became the 1st Battalion when the 2nd Battalion was reformed in 1857, and went to China in 1860 at the time of the Second Opium War, fighting at the Third Battle of Taku Forts and the capture of Beijing. It was stationed in the Imperial fortress colony of Bermuda from 1864 to 1866. Although too far North for yellow fever to establish itself in perpetuity, the disease was introduced to Bermuda several times during the 19th century by mail boats from the West Indies, causing endemics that resulted in many deaths, most particularly among members of the armed forces. Under the command of Lieutenant-Colonel F. L. O. Attye, the battalion arrived at the Royal Naval Dockyard, Bermuda (aboard HMS Orontes from Gibraltar, via Madeira) on 15 July 1864, in the midst of one of these epidemics and its losses in Bermuda included Assistant Surgeon James Murray Chalk at St. George's Garrison on 8 February 1865 and Douglas James Mounteny Rose, the five-year-old son of Lieutenant-Colonel Rose, who died the following day. (Note: 'On 28th Oct 1864 he was appointed Assistant Surgeon 2nd (Queen’s Royal) Regiment of Foot on the death of Assistant Surgeon Henry Stewart Lodge at Bermuda on 31st August 1864. The Bermuda Garrison was the military establishment maintained on the British Overseas Territory of Bermuda by the regular British Army, and its local militia and voluntary reserves from 1701 onwards. The Garrison existed primarily to defend the Royal Naval Dockyard (HM Dockyard Bermuda) and other facilities in Bermuda that were important to security in the region. St. George’s Garrison was the first permanent military camp of the Bermuda Garrison. On 9 Feb 1865 he died in St George’s Bermuda, the Colonial Capital of Bermuda, presumably due to illness or disease. He was only 29 years old'. The battalion lost fifty-two officers and men in the epidemic.) The battalion departed Bermuda for Cork, Ireland, under the command of Lieutenant-Colonel Werge, aboard HMS Orontes on 3 November 1866.

Officers of the 1st Battalion, 2nd Regiment of Foot, in Poona, India, 1877. Two future colonels of the regiment are seated among them.

The regiment was not fundamentally affected by the Cardwell Reforms of the 1870s, which gave it a depot at Stoughton Barracks in Guildford from 1873, or by the Childers reforms of 1881 – as it already possessed two battalions, there was no need for it to amalgamate with another regiment. Under the reforms it became The Queen's (Royal West Surrey) Regiment on 1 July 1881. In 1897–98, a battalion took part in the Tirah Expedition on the North-West Frontier.

The 1st battalion was stationed at Malta from 1891, then in India where it was posted at Rawalpindi until late 1902 when it moved to Peshawar near the historic Khyber Pass on the border to Afghanistan. The 2nd Battalion fought in the Third Anglo-Burmese War from 1886 to 1888 and in South Africa from 1899 to 1904 including during the Second Boer War (1899–1902). From October 1910 until October 1912, it was stationed in the Imperial fortress colony of Gibraltar. From October 1912 through 1914 it was stationed in the Imperial fortress colony of Bermuda, as the regular infantry battalion of the Bermuda Garrison. While in Bermuda, the Edison Studios filmed The Relief of Lucknow and For Valour there, and was provided extensive support from the garrison, with parts of Prospect Camp providing sets, and personnel from the 2nd Battalion appearing as extras.

A 3rd (Militia) Battalion was formed from the former 2nd Royal Surrey Militia, with headquarters at Guildford. The Battalion was embodied in December 1899 to provide troops for the Second Boer War, 550 men embarked for South Africa in February 1900; and returned to the United Kingdom in May 1902, when it received a public welcome and reception at Guildford.

Under the Childers Reforms, two battalions of the Volunteer Force were attached to the regiment in 1883. These had originally been raised in 1859–60 in response to an invasion scare. The 1st Volunteer Battalion (VB) was formed from the 2nd Surrey Rifle Volunteer Corps (RVC), at the Old Barracks, Mitcham Road, Croydon, while the 2nd VB was formed from the 4th Surrey RVC at Reigate Both Volunteer Battalions contributed to service companies of volunteers who served alongside the regulars during the Second Boer War, and received the battle honour for the campaign.

Under the Haldane Reforms of 1908 the Militia became the Special Reserve and the Volunteers became part of the Territorial Force (TF). The regiment now had the 3rd Battalion (Special Reserve), with the 4th Battalion (TF) at the Old Barracks in Croydon and the 5th Battalion (TF) at Sandfield Terrace in Guildford (since demolished).

=== The First World War ===
==== Regular Army ====
Officers of the 1st Battalion, Queen's Royal Regiment, at Bordon Camp, Hampshire, 11 August 1914. Seated in the centre of the second row is the colonel of the regiment, Major General Sir Edward Hamilton.

The 1st Battalion landed at Le Havre as part of the 3rd Infantry Brigade in the 1st Division in August 1914, and spent the entire war on the Western Front. The battalion saw action at the Battle of Mons, the Battle of the Marne, the Battle of the Aisne, the Battle of Ypres, the Battle of Aubers Ridge, the Battle of Festubert, Battle of Loos, The Hindenburg Line, the Battle of Bellecourt, the Battle of Broodseinde, the Battle of Passchendaele and the Battle of Arras.

The 2nd Battalion was in South Africa when war broke out and landed at Zeebrugge as part of the 22nd Brigade in the 7th Division in October 1914 for service on the Western Front. It fought at the Battle of Ypres, Battle of Aubers Ridge, Battle of Festubert, Battle of Loos and the Battle of the Somme until November 1917, when it was sent to the Italian Front, taking part in the battles of the Piave and Vittorio Veneto.

==== Territorial Force ====
Officers of the 6th (Service) Battalion, Queen's (Royal West Surrey) Regiment, on the roof of their dug-out, Arras, France, February 1917. They are, from left to right: Lieutenant Barton, Lieutenant Watts, Lieutenant Edwards, Lieutenant Menair, and Lieutenant Foster.

The 1/4th Battalion moved to India as part of the Surrey Brigade in the Home Counties Division in October 1914 and remained there throughout the war, serving on the North West Frontier, and was afterwards involved in the Third Afghan War in 1919. The 1/5th Battalion also went to India with the Home Counties Division, but then transferred to Mesopotamia in December 1915.

As soon as the 1st-Line Territorials had gone overseas, the Territorial Associations started raising 2nd- and 3rd-Line battalions, designated the 2/4th, 2/5th etc. The 4th Queen's was unusual in sending its 3rd-Line battalion overseas, so a 4/4th Bn was raised to train recruits; eventually it absorbed the 3/5th Bn as the 4th Reserve Battalion.

The 2/4th Battalion saw more varied service than any of the other Queen's TF battalions, in the Gallipoli Campaign, in Egypt, and Palestine, all as part of the 53rd (Welsh) Division, before being sent back as reinforcements to the Western Front where it served in 34th Division under French command before taking part in the final advance to victory in November 1918.

The 3/4th Bn was sent to the Western Front as reinforcements in August 1917, where it joined 21st Division and fought at Broodseinde and Cambrai. It was broken up to provide drafts in February 1918.

There were also 19th and 20th TF Battalions formed from the Home Service men of the regiment.

==== New Army ====
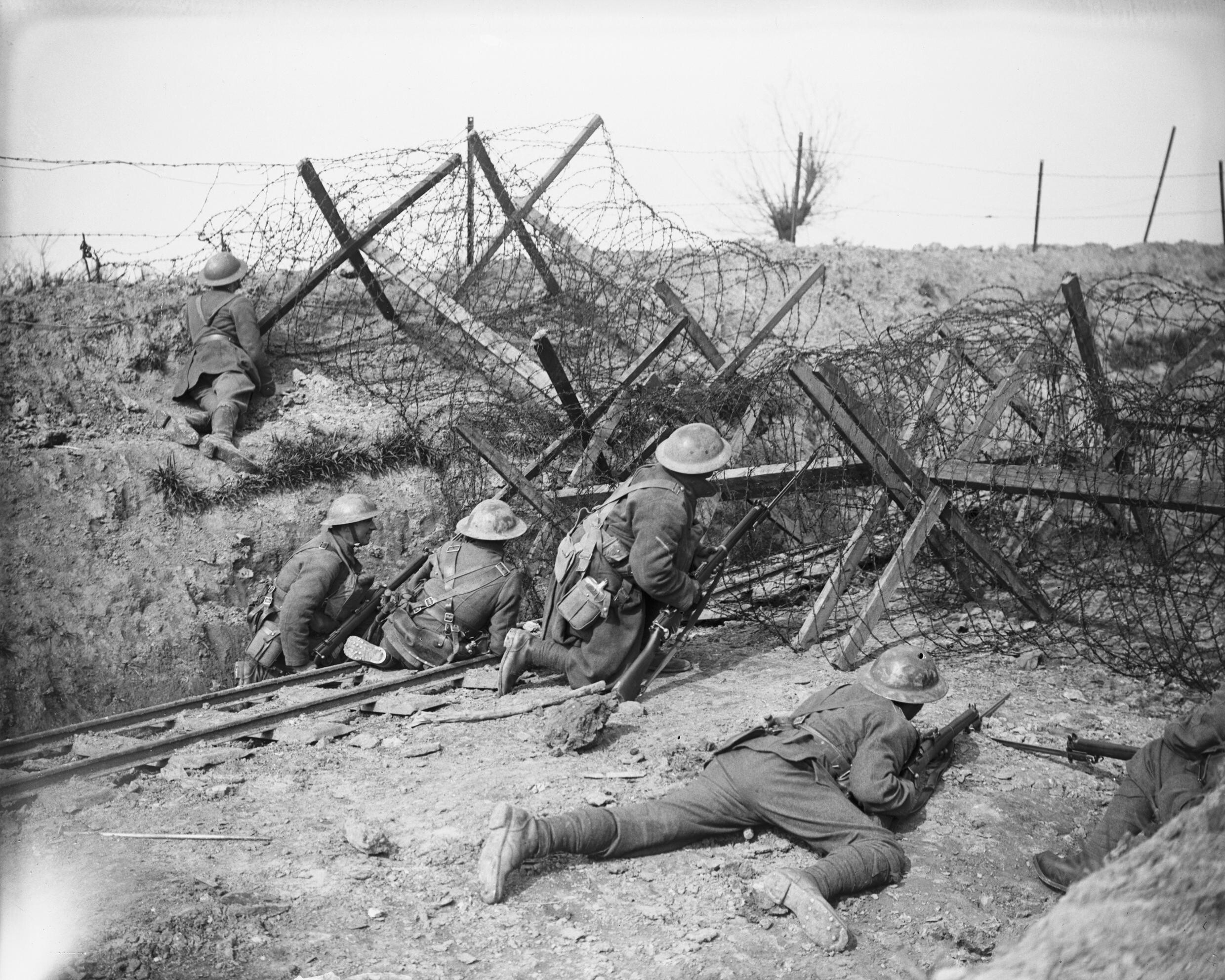
The Battle of the Lys. A picquet of the 10th (Service) Battalion, Queen's (Royal West Surrey) Regiment of the 41st Division behind a wire "block" on a road at St. Jean, 29 April 1918.

The Queen's also formed a number of battalions of the New Army, or 'Kitchener's Army'

- 6th (Service) Bn – served in 12th (Eastern) Division on the Western Front
- 7th (Service) Bn – served in 18th (Eastern) Division on the Western Front
- 8th (Service) Bn – served in 24th Division on the Western Front
- 9th (Reserve) Bn – served in the UK training recruits
- 10th (Service) Bn (Battersea) – formed by the Metropolitan Borough of Battersea and served in 41st Division on the Western Front
- 11th (Service) Bn (Lambeth) – formed by the Metropolitan Borough of Lambeth and also served in 41st Division
- 12th (Reserve) Bn – served in the UK training recruits

==== Other battalions ====
- 13th (Labour) Bn – served on the Western Front
- 14th (Labour) Bn – served in Salonika
- 15th (Labour) Bn – served on the Western Front
- 16th (Home Service) Bn – served in the UK
- 17th (Labour) Bn – served in the UK
- 18th (Labour) Bn – served in the UK

Returning prisoners of war were awarded a "Welcome Home Medal" at a reception in Guildford in January 1919. The medal has the regimental badge on one side and the inscription, "Prisoners of War The Queens Regiment Welcome Home" on the reverse and is dated MCMXVIII.

=== Between the wars ===
The 1st Battalion spent the inter-war years on garrison duty, both in Britain and overseas. The 2nd Battalion took part in the Waziristan campaign of 1919–1920, attempting to pacify the tribal areas during the unrest following the Third Afghan War. It was in Palestine during the Insurgency of 1936–1939.

The 4th and 5th Battalions were both reformed in the Territorial Army, assigned to the 131st (Surrey) Infantry Brigade, alongside the 5th and 6th battalions of the East Surrey Regiment. However, in the reorganisation of the Territorial Army's infantry in the late 1930s, the 4th Queen's was transferred to the Royal Artillery and converted into the 63rd (Queen's) Searchlight Regiment.

The regiment was also reassigned the 22nd and 24th (County of London) battalions of the London Regiment, which disbanded in 1938. These battalions became the 6th (Bermondsey) and 7th (Southwark) battalions of the Queen's Royal Regiment (West Surrey) and joined the 5th Battalion in 131st Brigade.

=== Second World War ===
The 1st Battalion was serving in British India on the outbreak of the Second World War but did not see action until 1942 against the Imperial Japanese Army. The 1st Queens fought in the Burma Campaign throughout the war as part of the 33rd Indian Infantry Brigade, 7th Indian Infantry Division, of the British Fourteenth Army under Lieutenant General William "Bill" Slim.

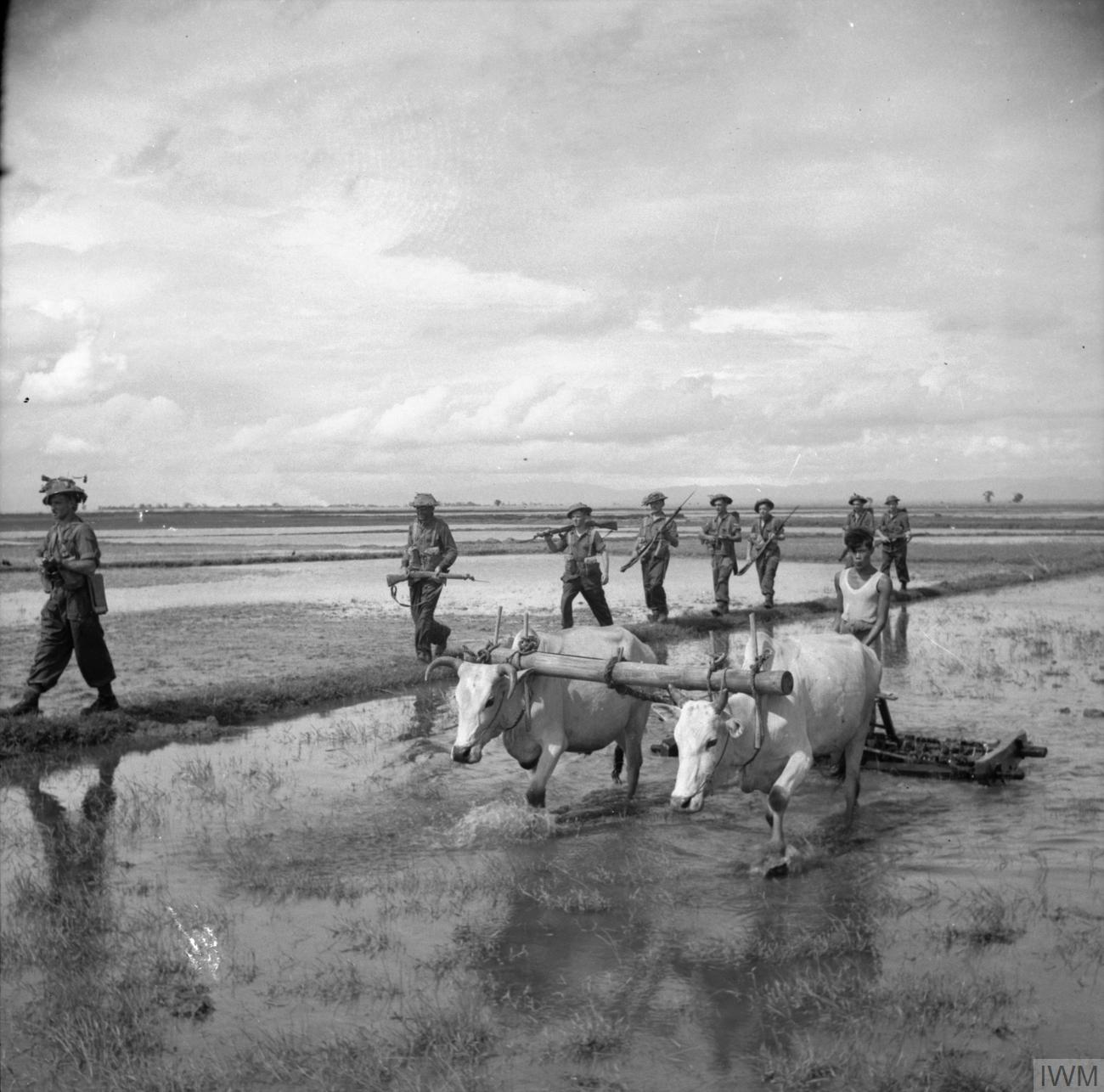
A patrol from the 1st Battalion, Queen's Own Royal Regiment (West Surrey), crossing a paddy field where a Burmese tiller is at work with a team of oxen, near Waw, 12–13 July 1945.

The 2nd Battalion, initially commanded by Lieutenant Colonel Robert Ross until April 1940, spent the early years of the war in the Middle East and Syria before also going out to the Far East. They were part of the 16th Brigade, 6th Infantry Division which was later redesignated as the 70th Infantry Division and were involved in Operation Thursday, the second Chindits campaign. The Chindits were the creation of Brigadier Orde Wingate. After suffering heavy casualties in the Chindits campaign, 2nd Queen's reverted to being an ordinary infantry battalion, nicknamed PBI (Poor Bloody Infantry), and served with 29th Infantry Brigade, part of 36th Infantry Division from May 1945 onwards.

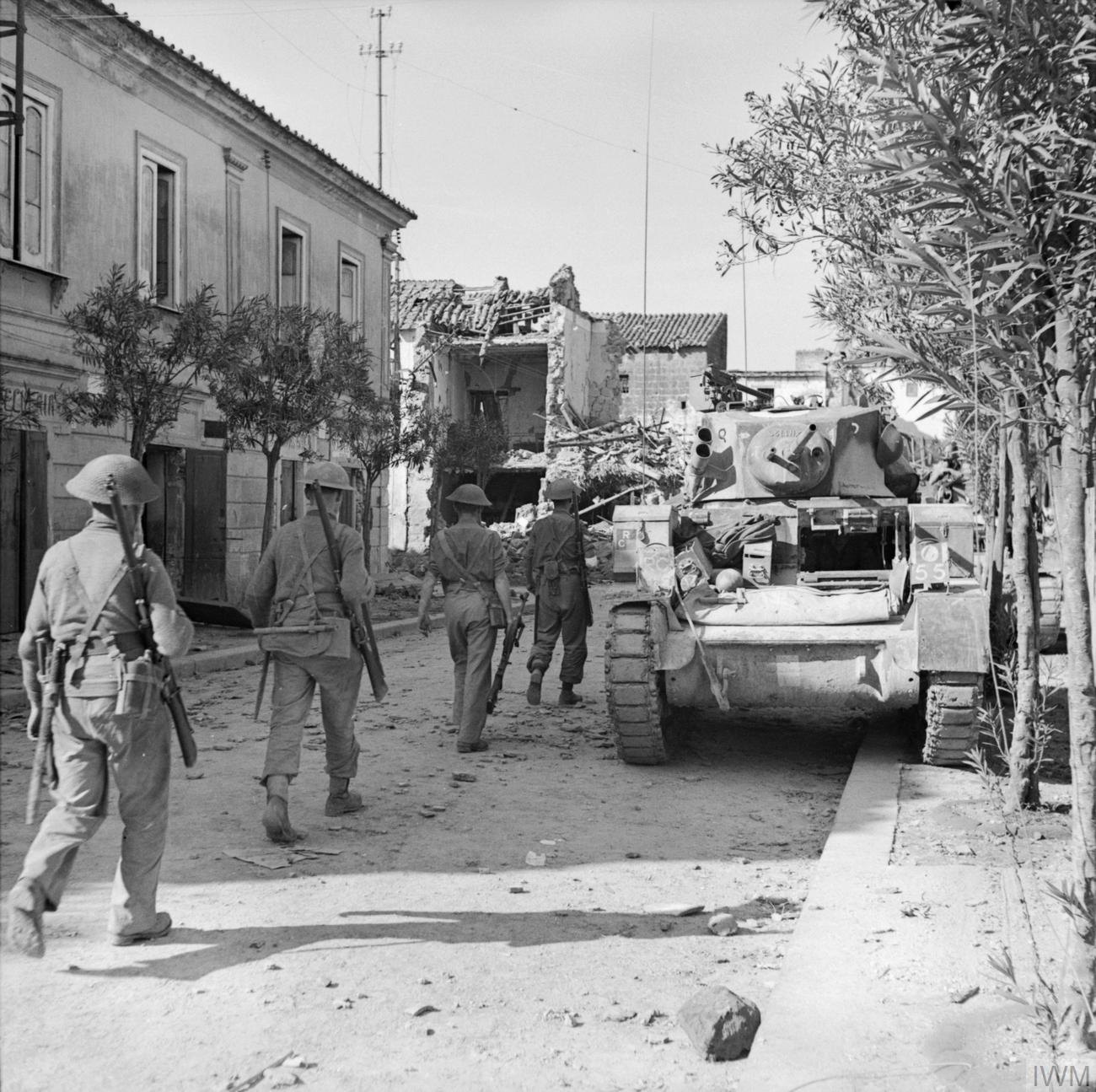
Infantrymen of the 1/7th Battalion, Queen's Royal Regiment (West Surrey) and a Stuart tank in Grazzanise, Italy, 12 October 1943.

The 1/5th, 1/6th, and 1/7th were all 1st Line Territorial Army battalions that were serving in the 131st Infantry Brigade, which was a part of the 44th (Home Counties) Infantry Division, a 1st Line Territorial Army division. The brigade was sent, along with the rest of the division, to France in 1940 to join the British Expeditionary Force (BEF) and were quickly involved in the Battle of France and subsequent Dunkirk evacuation. They arrived in England and the division was led for a while by Major-General Brian Horrocks. The division was later sent to North Africa in mid-1942 to join the British Eighth Army and fought in the Battle of Alam el Halfa and later in the Second Battle of El Alamein where the 131st Brigade was assigned to the 7th Armoured Division and would remain with them for the rest of the war. The brigade participated in the Tunisian and Italian Campaigns and the North West Europe Campaign. In December 1944, due to heavy casualties and a shortage of infantrymen in the British Army, the 1/6th and 1/7th Battalions were replaced by 2nd Battalion, Devonshire Regiment and 9th Battalion, Durham Light Infantry, both from the 50th (Northumbrian) Infantry Division. The 1/6th and 1/7th would spend the rest of the war as training units with the 50th Infantry Division. Meanwhile the 1/5th were detached from 131 Brigade to 22nd Armoured Brigade mounted in Kangaroos in April 1945 for the final weeks of the war and the fighting towards Hamburg.

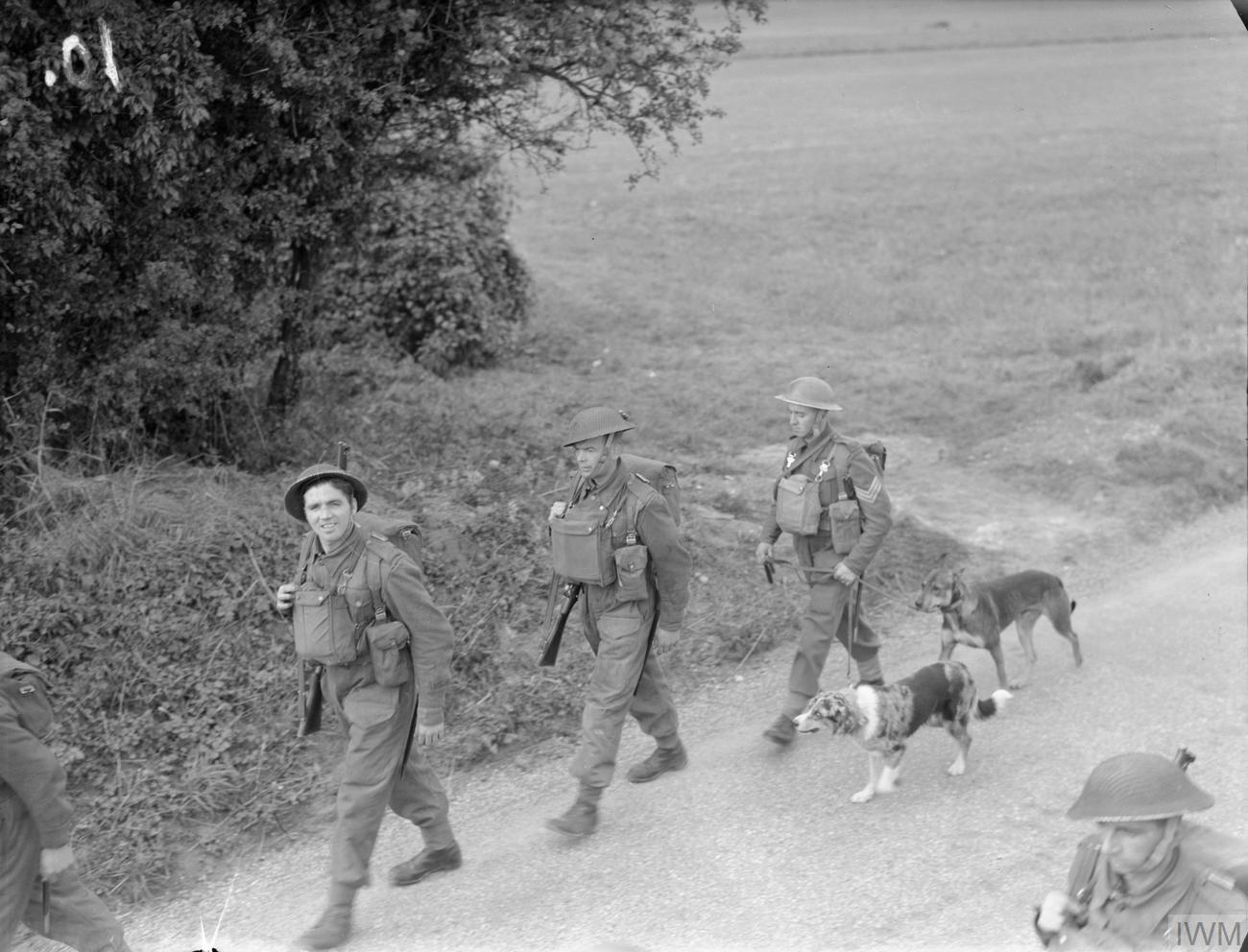
Infantrymen of the Queen's Royal Regiment (West Surrey) on the march with messenger dogs near Barham, Kent, 13 October 1941.

The regiment also raised the 2/5th, 2/6th, and 2/7th which were all 2nd Line Territorial Army battalions serving in the 35th Infantry Brigade of the 12th (Eastern) Infantry Division, a 2nd Line Territorial Army duplicate of the 44th (Home Counties) Division. They were also sent to France in 1940 and were involved in the Battle of Dunkirk where they suffered heavy casualties due to the men having very little training. The division was disbanded shortly after returning to England and the 35th Brigade was later redesignated the 169th Infantry Brigade. The 169th Brigade was to serve with the 56th Division for the rest of the war in the Italian Campaign in battles at Salerno, Anzio and in the final Allied offensive in Italy, Operation Grapeshot.

In January 1944 Lieutenant Alec George Horwood of the 1/6th Battalion was awarded the Victoria Cross whilst fighting in the Burma Campaign whilst attached to the 1st Battalion, Northamptonshire Regiment.

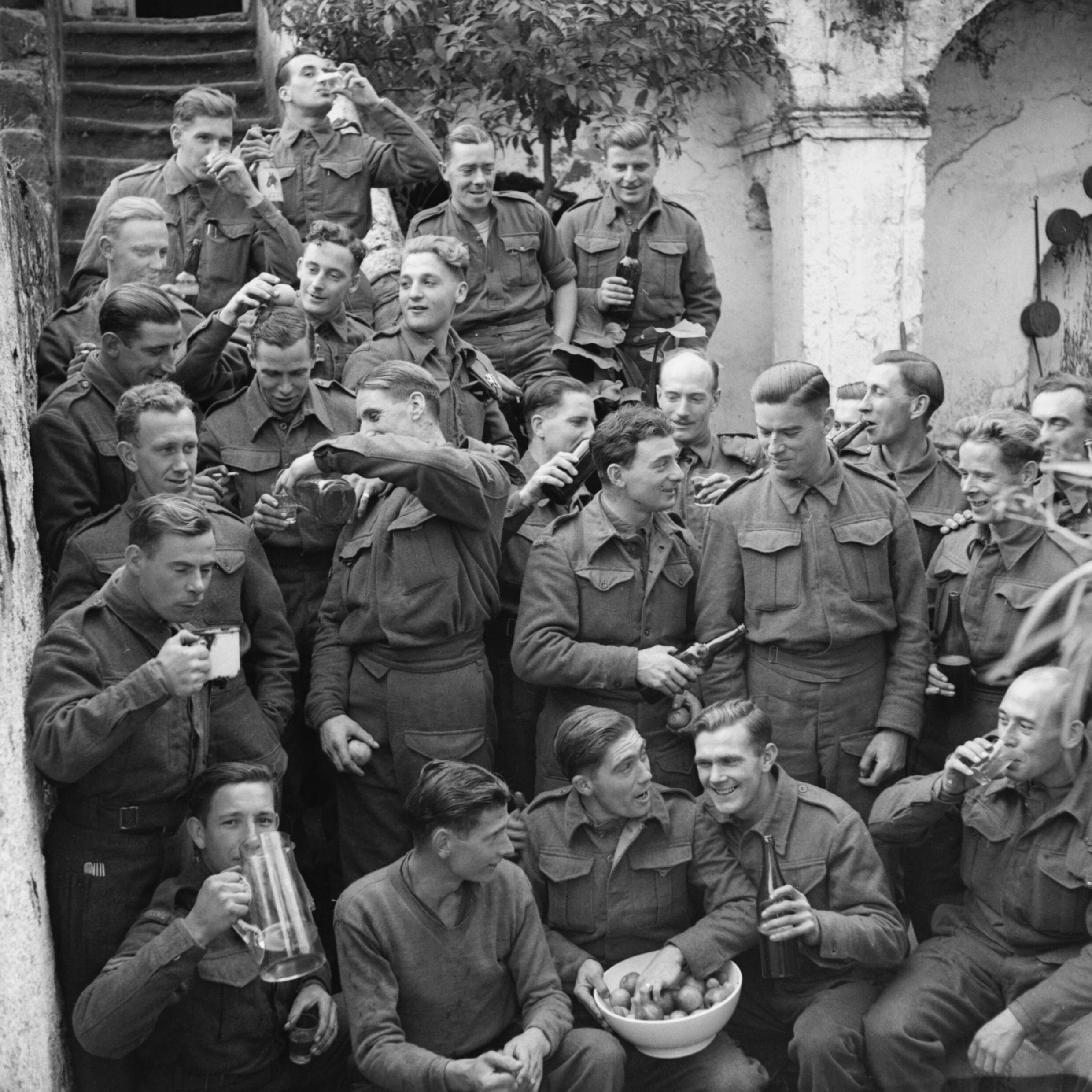
Men of the 2/6th Battalion, Queen's Royal Regiment (West Surrey) celebrate Christmas in Italy, 25 December 1943.

63rd (Queen's) Searchlight Regiment served in Anti-Aircraft Command during the Battle of Britain and the Blitz, then converted into 127th (Queen's) Light Anti-Aircraft Regiment, Royal Artillery and manned Bofors guns to protect the Mulberry harbour after D-Day, and then defended Antwerp late in the war.

The regiment raised many other battalions during the war, mainly for home defence or as training units. None of these units saw active service, they remained in the United Kingdom for the duration of war. They fulfilled a role of supplying the battalions overseas with trained infantrymen or were converted into other roles. For example, the 13th Battalion, raised in 1940, was assigned–in an infantry capacity–to the 80th Infantry (Reserve) Division. The 14th Battalion was raised in Dorchester in early July 1940 commanded by Lieutenant Colonel Alexander Wilkinson. and in October the battalion was assigned to the 201st Independent Infantry Brigade (Home) and commenced anti-invasion duties. On 1 December 1941 the battalion was converted into the 99th Light Anti-Aircraft Regiment, Royal Artillery, and it subsequently served in Italy.

=== Post-war service and amalgamation ===
The 2nd Battalion was disbanded in 1948 and its personnel transferred to 1st Battalion (which had previously been reduced to nil strength in 1947). The 1st Battalion served in Berlin during the blockade to 1949 then Iserlohn in BAOR (British Army of the Rhine) part of 5th Infantry Brigade, 2nd Infantry Division (Crossed Keys) until 1953. The 1st Battalion fought the Malayan National Liberation Army during the Malayan Emergency from 1954 to 1957. In 1957, it returned to Germany, where, in 1959, it was amalgamated with 1st Battalion, East Surrey Regiment, to form the 1st Battalion, Queen's Royal Surrey Regiment (less Territorials). When the QRSs merged into the new larger Queen's Regiment, the battalion became the 1st (Queen's Royal Surreys) Battalion, but this subtitle was omitted on 1 July 1968. Today the regiment's successors can be traced to the 1st Battalion, Princess of Wales's Royal Regiment.

== Heritage & ceremonial ==
=== Traditions ===
The Queen's Regiment celebrated 1 June each year to mark its service at the 'Glorious First of June' naval battle. Even territorial and war-raised battalions tried to keep the day as a regimental holiday while on campaign.

After World War II the Queen's also celebrated 9 September in memory of Salerno, where all six of the regiment's TA infantry battalions had fought.

=== Regimental museum ===
The Surrey Infantry Museum was based at Clandon Park House, near Guildford, until the house was destroyed in a fire in April 2015. The Princess of Wales's Royal Regiment and Queen's Regiment Museum is housed at Dover Castle. The Surrey Infantry Collection and archives covering the period 1661–1966 are now housed at the Surrey History Centre at Woking. There are display cases on the regiment in two local museums: The Lightbox at Woking and at Guildford Museum.

=== Battle honours ===
The regiment's battle honours were as follows:

- Tangier 1662–80, Namur 1695, Ushant, Egypt, Vimiera, Corunna, Salamanca, Vittoria, Pyrenees, Nivelle, Toulouse, Peninsula, Ghuznee 1839, Khelat, Affghanistan 1839, South Africa 1851-2-3, Taku Forts, Pekin 1860, Burma 1885–87, Tirah, Relief of Ladysmith, South Africa 1899–1902
- The Great War (25 battalions): Mons, Retreat from Mons, Marne 1914 '18, Aisne 1914, Ypres 1914 '17 '18, Langemarck 1914, Gheluvelt, Aubers, Festubert 1915, Loos, Somme 1916 '18, Albert 1916 '18, Bazentin, Delville Wood, Pozières, Guillemont, Flers-Courcelette, Morval, Thiepval, Le Transloy, Ancre Heights, Ancre 1916 '18, Arras 1917 '18, Scarpe 1917, Bullecourt, Messines 1917, Pilckem, Menin Road, Polygon Wood, Broodseinde, Passchendaele, Cambrai 1917 '18, St. Quentin, Bapaume 1918, Rosières, Avre, Villers Bretonneux, Lys, Hazebrouck, Bailleul, Kemmel, Soissonais Ourcq, Amiens, Hindenburg Line, Épéhy, St. Quentin Canal, Courtrai, Selle, Sambre, France and Flanders 1914–18, Piave, Vittorio Veneto, Italy 1917–18, Suvla, Landing at Suvla, Scimitar Hill, Gallipoli 1915, Rumani, Egypt 1915–16, Gaza, El Mughar, Jerusalem, Jericho, Tell 'Asur, Palestine 1917–18, Khan Baghdadi, Mesopotamia 1915–18, N W Frontier India 1916–17
- Afghanistan 1919
- The Second World War: Defence of Escaut, Villers Bocage, Mont Pincon, Lower Maas, Roer, North-West Europe 1940 '44–45, Syria 1941, Sidi Barrani, Tobruk 1941, Tobruk Sortie, Deir el Munassib, El Alamein, Advance on Tripoli, Medenine, Tunis, North Africa 1940–43, Salerno, Monte Stella, Scafati Bridge, Volturno Crossing, Monte Camino, Garigliano Crossing, Damiano, Anzio, Gothic Line, Gemmano Ridge, Senio Pocket, Senio Floodbank, Casa Fabri Bridge, Menate, Filo, Argenta Gap, Italy 1943–45, North Arakan, Kohima, Yenangyaung 1945, Sittang 1945, Chindits 1944, Burma 1943–45
- 4th, 5th Battalions: South Africa 1900–02

=== Victoria Cross ===
The following members of the regiment were awarded the Victoria Cross:

- Lieutenant (later Brigadier-General) Wallace Duffield Wright, Kano-Sokoto Expedition
- Captain (temporary Lieutenant Colonel, later Lieutenant-General) Bernard Cyril Freyberg, Great War
- 2nd Lieutenant (acting Captain) Clement Robertson, Great War
- Lance Corporal John William Sayer, Great War
- Captain (temporary Lieutenant Colonel) Christopher Bushell, Great War
- Lieutenant Alec George Horwood, Second World War

=== Regimental Colonels ===
The colonels of the regiment were as follows:

- 30 September 1661: Colonel Henry Mordaunt, 2nd Earl of Peterborough KG – Captain-General of Tangier
- 9 April 1663: Colonel Andrew Rutherford, 1st Earl of Teviot – killed in action at Tangier
- 10 June 1664: Lieutenant-General Henry Norwood
- 15 May 1668: Lieutenant-General John Middleton, 1st Earl of Middleton
- 5 March 1675: Colonel William O'Brien, 2nd Earl of Inchiquin
- 10 November 1680: Colonel Sir Palmes Fairborne – died before his commission was signed
- 19 April 1682: Lieutenant-General Piercy Kirke
- 18 December 1691: Major-General William Selwyn
- 28 June 1701: Lieutenant-General Sir Henry Bellasis

The Queen's Royal Regiment of Foot – (1703)

- 27 February 1703: General David Colyear, 1st Earl of Portmore KT
- 19 September 1710: Lieutenant-General Piercy Kirke – son of above

The Queen's Own Regiment of Foot – (1727)

- 12 August 1741: Lieutenant-General Thomas Fowke – dismissed for failing to reinforce Minorca

2nd (The Queen's Royal) Regiment of Foot – (1751)

- 12 November 1755: General John Fitzwilliam
- 27 November 1760: Lieutenant-General Sir Charles Montagu KB
- 7 August 1777: Lieutenant-General Daniel Jones
- 20 November 1793: Major-General Alexander Stewart
- 20 December 1794: General James Coates
- 22 July 1822: Major-General Sir Henry Torrens KCB
- 25 August 1828: General Sir William Keppel GCB
- 23 December 1834: General Sir James Kempt GCB GCH
- 7 August 1846: Lieutenant-General Alexander George Fraser, 17th Lord Saltoun KT KCB GCH
- 29 August 1853: Lieutenant-General Sir John Rolt KCB KH
- 9 November 1856: Lieutenant-General Sir James Holmes Schoedde KCB
- 28 May 1857: Major-General John Spink KH
- 15 March 1877: General Clement Alexander Edwards CB
- 25 March 1877: General Henry Smyth CB

The Queen's (Royal West Surrey) Regiment – (1881)

- 6 June 1891: General Robert Bruce
- 15 October 1891: Lieutenant-General Frederick Green Wilkinson CB
- 29 August 1893: General Sir Edward Selby Smyth KCMG
- 23 September 1896: Lieutenant-General Granville George Chetwynd Stapylton
- 16 April 1902: General Sir Thomas Kelly-Kenny GCB GCVO
- 27 December 1914: Major-General Sir Edmund Owen Fisher Hamilton KCB
- 13 October 1920: General Sir Charles Monro, 1st Baronet GCB GCSI GCMG

The Queen's Royal Regiment (West Surrey) – (1921)

- 7 December 1929: Major-General Sir Wilkinson Dent Bird KBE CB CMG DSO
- 4 May 1939: General Sir Ivo Lucius Beresford Vesey KCB KBE CMG DSO
- 1 May 1945: General Sir George James Giffard GCB DSO
- 28 September 1954: Major-General John Yeldham Whitfield CB DSO OBE

=== Memorials ===
The Queen's Regiment Memorial at Holy Trinity Church, Guildford.

The chapel of the Queen's Regiment is at Holy Trinity Church, Guildford, in the former home town of both the Queen's Regimental Depot and the drill hall of the 5th Queen's. The monument in the chapel to the 11,000 men of the Queen's Regiment who died in World War I and World War II is a large wooden panel with a central niche surmounted by the Queen's badge of the Paschal Lamb.

There are also memorials to the 4th Queen's at Croydon Minster and Croydon Town Hall.

The 6th (Bermondsey) Battalion (formerly 22nd Londons) has its memorial to the two world wars on Old Jamaica Road in Bermondsey. The equivalent memorial to the 7th (Southwark) Battalion (formerly 24th Londons) is just inside the entrance to Kennington Park.

== Sources ==
- Maj A.F. Becke,History of the Great War: Order of Battle of Divisions, Part 2a: The Territorial Force Mounted Divisions and the 1st-Line Territorial Force Divisions (42–56), London: HM Stationery Office, 1935/Uckfield: Naval & Military Press, 2007, ISBN 1-847347-39-8.
- Maj A.F. Becke,History of the Great War: Order of Battle of Divisions, Part 2b: The 2nd-Line Territorial Force Divisions (57th–69th), with the Home-Service Divisions (71st–73rd) and 74th and 75th Divisions, London: HM Stationery Office, 1937/Uckfield: Naval & Military Press, 2007, ISBN 1-847347-39-8.
- Maj A.F. Becke,History of the Great War: Order of Battle of Divisions, Part 3a: New Army Divisions (9–26), London: HM Stationery Office, 1938/Uckfield: Naval & Military Press, 2007, ISBN 1-847347-41-X.
- Maj A.F. Becke,History of the Great War: Order of Battle of Divisions, Part 3b: New Army Divisions (30–41) and 63rd (R.N.) Division, London: HM Stationery Office, 1939/Uckfield: Naval & Military Press, 2007, ISBN 1-847347-41-X.
- Ian F.W. Beckett, Riflemen Form: A study of the Rifle Volunteer Movement 1859–1908, Aldershot: Ogilby Trusts, 1982, ISBN 0-85936-271-X.
- Richard Cannon, Historical Record of the Second, or Queen's Royal Regiment of Foot, London Clowes and Sons, 1838.
- John Childs, The Army of Charles II, London: Routledge & Kegan Paul, 1976, ISBN0-7100-8301-7.
- Col John K. Dunlop, The Development of the British Army 1899–1914, London: Methuen, 1938.
- Gen Sir Martin Farndale, History of the Royal Regiment of Artillery: The Years of Defeat: Europe and North Africa, 1939–1941, Woolwich: Royal Artillery Institution, 1988/London: Brasseys, 1996, ISBN 1-85753-080-2.
- J.B.M. Frederick, Lineage Book of British Land Forces 1660–1978, Volume I, 1984: Microform Academic Publishers, Wakefield, United Kingdom. ISBN 1-85117-007-3.
- Jock Haswell, Famous Regiments Series: The Queen's Royal Regiment (West Surrey) (The 2nd Regiment of Foot), London: Hamish Hamilton, 1967.
- Lt-Col H.F. Joslen, Orders of Battle, United Kingdom and Colonial Formations and Units in the Second World War, 1939–1945, London: HM Stationery Office, 1960/London: London Stamp Exchange, 1990, ISBN 0-948130-03-2/Uckfield: Naval & Military Press, 2003, ISBN 1-843424-74-6.
- N.B. Leslie, Battle Honours of the British and Indian Armies 1695–1914, London: Leo Cooper, 1970, ISBN 0-85052-004-5.
- N.B. Leslie, The Succession of Colonels of the British Army from 1660 to the Present Day, Society for Army Historical Research Special Publication No 11, 1974.
- Brig N.W. Routledge, History of the Royal Regiment of Artillery: Anti-Aircraft Artillery 1914–55, London: Royal Artillery Institution/Brassey's, 1994, ISBN 1-85753-099-3.
- Edward M. Spiers, The Army and Society 1815–1914, London: Longmans, 1980, ISBN 0-582-48565-7.
- Ray Westlake, British Regiments at Gallipoli, Barnsley: Leo Cooper, 1996, ISBN 0-85052-511-X.
- Ray Westlake, Tracing the Rifle Volunteers, Barnsley: Pen and Sword, 2010, ISBN 978-1-84884-211-3.
- Col H.C. Wylly, History of the Queen's Royal (West Surrey) Regiment in the Great War, Aldershot: Gale & Polden, 1925/Uckfield, Naval & Military Press, 2003, ISBN 978-1-84342539-7.

=== External links ===
- The Queen's Royal Surrey Regiment (official site)
- The Queen's Royal Regiment Living History Group
- Queen's Royal West Surrey Regiment Re-enactment Society
- T.F. Mills, Land Forces of Britain, the Empire and Commonwealth – Regiments.org (archived at the Wayback Machine)
- The World War One Letters of Major Hugh J.C. Peirs, 8th Battalion, The Queen's Royal West Surrey Regiment
- The Drill Hall Project
- Stepping Forward: A Tribute to the Volunteer Military Reservists and Supporting Auxiliaries of Greater London
- Imperial War Museum, War Memorials Register
- War Memorials Online
