= Charles Jefferyes =

British general (died 1765)

Major-General Charles Jefferyes
- Born: c. 1690
- Died: 1765 (aged c. 75)
- Military career
- Allegiance: Great Britain
- Branch: British Army
- Service years: 1710–1759
- Rank: Major-General
- Units: Regiment of Foot (Heyman Rooke); Regiment of Foot (Alexander Grant); Regiment of Foot (Andrew Bisset)
- Commands: 14th Regiment of Foot; 34th Regiment of Foot; Battalion of 62nd (Royal American) Regiment of Foot
- Conflicts: Seven Years' War; Siege of Fort St Philip

Major-General Charles Jefferyes (other spellings exist; c. 1690–1765) was an officer of the British Army.

== Biography ==
He was a younger son of Brigadier-General Sir James Jefferyes of Blarney Castle, County Cork. On 20 November 1710, he joined the Army as an ensign in Colonel Heyman Rooke's Regiment of Foot. When the regiment was disbanded in 1712, he was placed on half-pay, but he was made ensign in Brigadier-General Alexander Grant's newly raised Regiment of Foot on 22 July 1715. He was promoted to lieutenant in Major-General Andrew Bisset's Regiment of Foot on 1 September 1721, to captain on 1 November 1734, and to major on 2 April 1742.

On 12 September 1745, Jefferyes was appointed lieutenant-colonel of the 14th Regiment of Foot, and was moved to the lieutenant-colonelcy of the 34th Regiment of Foot on 17 February 1746. In January 1756, he was promoted colonel commandant of a battalion of the 62nd (Royal American) Regiment of Foot. At this time, he was serving with the 34th at Minorca, which was shortly afterwards attacked by the French. Jefferyes distinguished himself in the defence of Port Mahon, particularly in repulsing an attack on the place by storm, though he was taken prisoner. On 7 September 1756, his gallantry was rewarded by promotion as colonel of the 14th Regiment of Foot, and on 27 June 1759 he was promoted to major-general.

Military offices
Preceded by Thomas Fowke	Colonel of the 14th Regiment of Foot; 1756–1765	Succeeded by William Keppel
