= 43rd (Monmouthshire) Regiment of Foot =

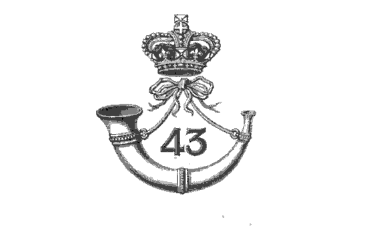
- Badge of the 43rd (Monmouthshire) Regiment of Foot
- Active: 1741–1881
- Country: Kingdom of Great Britain (1741–1800); United Kingdom (1801–1881)
- Branch: British Army
- Type: Infantry
- Size: One battalion (two battalions 1804–1817)
- Garrison/HQ: Copthorne Barracks, Shrewsbury
- Engagements: Seven Years War; American War of Independence; Peninsular War; Battle of New Orleans; Indian Mutiny; New Zealand Wars

The 43rd (Monmouthshire) Regiment of Foot was an infantry regiment of the British Army, raised in 1741. Under the Childers Reforms it amalgamated with the 52nd (Oxfordshire) Regiment of Foot (Light Infantry) to form the 1st and 2nd battalions of the Oxfordshire Light Infantry in 1881. The regiment went on to become the Oxfordshire and Buckinghamshire Light Infantry in 1908.

== History ==
=== Raising and Seven Years War ===
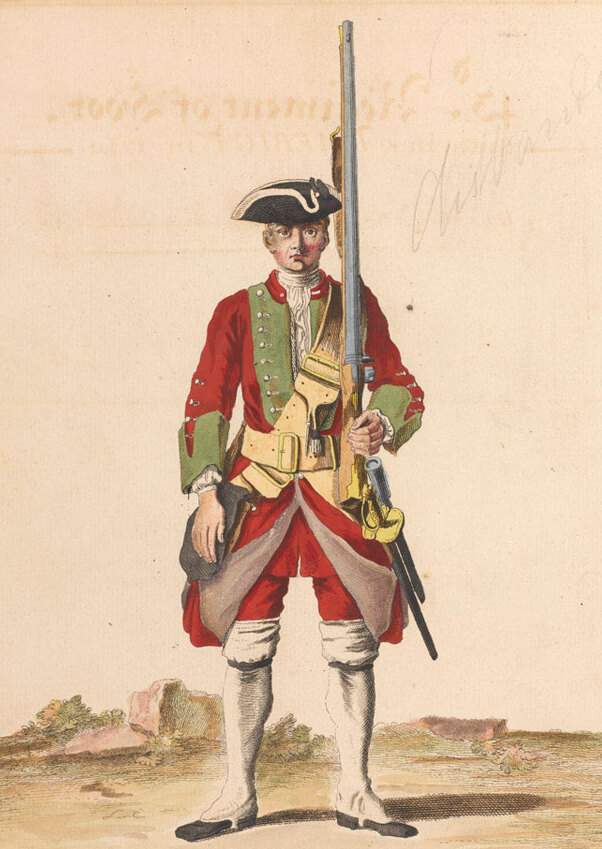
c. 1742 engraving of a regimental private

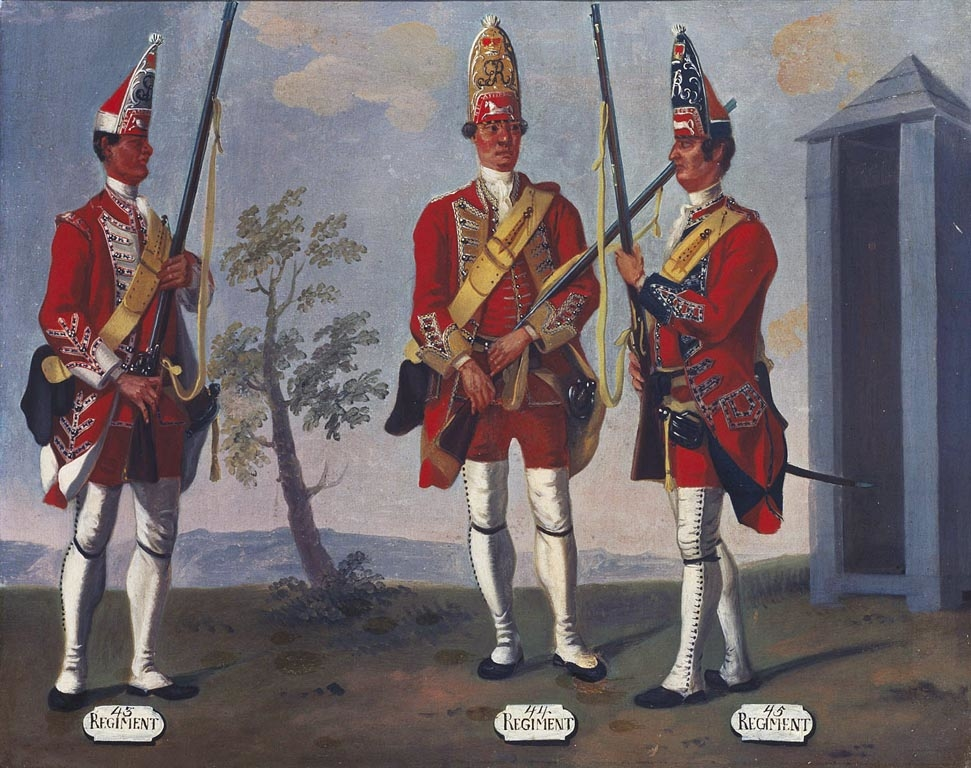
c. 1751 painting of a regimental grenadier (left)

The regiment was raised at Winchester by Colonel Thomas Fowke as Thomas Fowke's Regiment of Foot in 1741. The regiment's first deployment was on garrison duties at Menorca in 1742. The regiment was numbered 54th Regiment of Foot from 1747 until 1751 when it became the 43rd Regiment of Foot.

In May 1757, the 43rd sailed for North America, arriving at Halifax, Nova Scotia the following month to defend the British North American colonies during the French and Indian War (the North American Theatre of the Seven Years' War) against France. A detachment of the 43rd was defeated in a skirmish with Mi'kmaq and Acadian resistance fighters at Bloody Creek near Fort Anne on 8 December 1757. The regiment had spent almost two years on garrison duties when, in 1759, as part of General Wolfe's force, it took part in the capture of Quebec gaining its first battle honour. The next campaign was in the West Indies where the 43rd took part in the capture of Martinique in January 1762 and of Saint Lucia later in the month from the French and the capture of Havana In August 1762 from the Spanish.

=== American War of Independence ===
The regiment returned to North America in 1774 and remained there throughout the American War of Independence. The 43rd were joined by the 52nd at Boston in June 1774. At the Battles of Lexington and Concord, the Grenadier and Light Infantry (flank) companies of the regiment were deployed.

At the Battle of Bunker Hill, the regiment formed part of the 'Assault Force', which had the unfortunate job of assaulting the heavily defended Breeds Hill. Following the Siege of Boston, the regiment was evacuated to Halifax in Nova Scotia. One year later, the regiment sailed for Long Island and took part in the Battle of Long Island,

Between 16 and 18 November 1776, the regiment took part in the Battle of Rhode Island, and shortly thereafter was withdrawn back to New York where it took part in the Battle of Fort Washington and Battle of Fort Lee.

In 1781, the regiment was moved back into New York City where it formed part of the garrison under Major General Henry Clinton. Later that year, the regiment joined Brigadier General Benedict Arnold in his Virginia campaign and took part in the Battle of Green Spring.

Later, the regiment arrived in Yorktown and was present during the Siege of Yorktown later that year.

In 1782, regimental county titles were granted and the 43rd became the 43rd (Monmouthshire) Regiment of Foot. The regiment returned to the West Indies in January 1794 to capture for the second time Martinique and Saint Lucia which following the peace treaty of 1763 had been returned to France. They were defeated at Guadeloupe in 1794 by a much larger French force after defending their position for three months.

=== Light Infantry ===
In 1803, the 43rd, the 52nd and the 95th Rifles became the first Corps of Light Infantry and formed the Light Brigade at Shorncliffe in Kent under the command of Major-General John Moore. The regiment was re-titled as the 43rd (Monmouthshire) Regiment of Foot (Light Infantry). The 43rd was part of a force led by Sir Arthur Wellesley which in 1807 captured Copenhagen and the entire Danish fleet.

=== Peninsular War ===
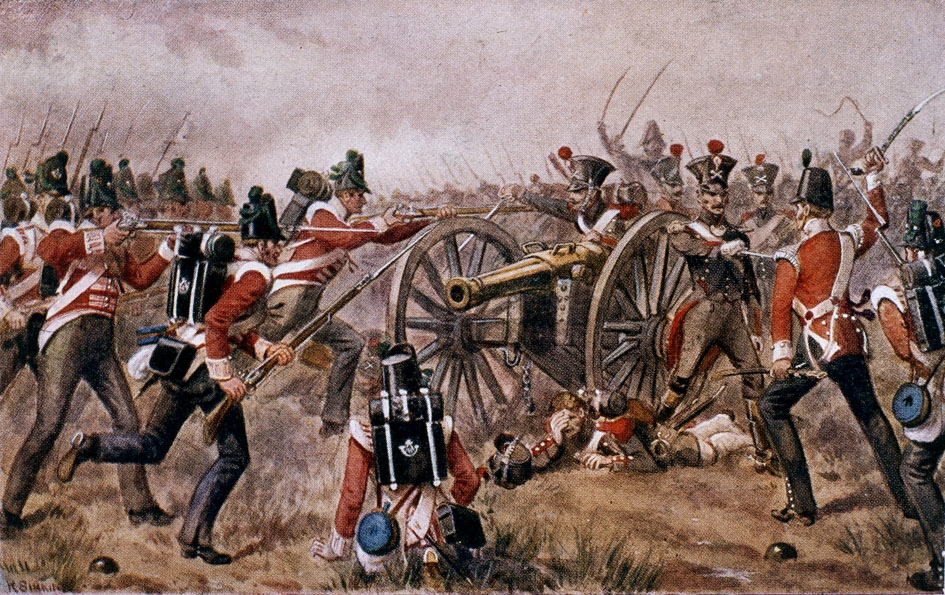
The regiment at the Battle of Sabugal

In August 1808, during the Peninsular War, the 43rd fought in the Battle of Vimeiro which drove Napoleon's forces from Portugal. The campaign against the French then moved to Spain where in January 1809 the regiment took part in the retreat to Vigo and Corunna; achieving fame as part of the rearguard to the army before returning to England. In May 1809 the 1st battalion of the 43rd, as part of Sir Robert Craufurd's Light Brigade, sailed for Portugal to join Sir Arthur Wellesley's army. On landing at Lisbon the 43rd moved to Spain to support Wellesley's forces there. The battalion's march of 250 miles from Lisbon to Talavera included a march of fifty-two miles in twenty-six hours in the hottest season of the year. The battle of Talavera had been won before the battalion arrived. However, a company of the 43rd which had been at Lisbon from December 1808 fought in the battle as part of General Richard Stewart's brigade. In 1810 the 43rd formed part of the Light Division under the command of Sir Robert Craufurd. The 43rd fought in the battle of the crossing of the Côa in July 1810, the Battle of Bussaco in September 1810 and the Battle of Sabugal in April 1811. The 43rd also took part in the Battle of Fuentes de Oñoro in May 1811, the assault on the fortress of Ciudad Rodrigo in January 1812 and the Siege of Badajoz in April 1812; when storming the breach the 43rd lost 20 officers and 335 men.

The regiment went on to fight at the Battle of Salamanca in July 1812 and the Battle of Vitoria in June 1813 and then pursued the French Army into France where they saw action at the Battle of Nivelle in November 1813, the Battle of the Nive in December 1813 and the Battle of Toulouse in April 1814. Following the end of the Peninsular War in 1814 the Light Division was disbanded and the 43rd returned to England.

The 2nd battalion of the 43rd was part of the Walcheren Campaign in 1809 where many troops died to fever in the Scheldt marshes.

=== Battle of New Orleans ===
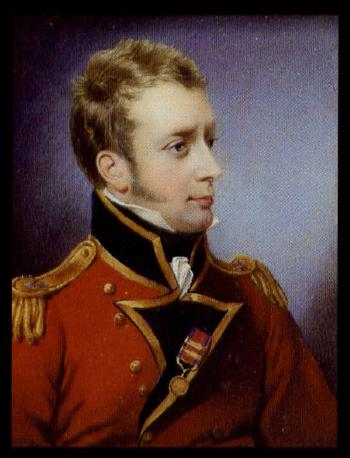
Sir Hercules Robert Pakenham, the colonel of the regiment in the late 1840s

The 43rd returned to America in 1814 as part of an expeditionary force which initially had some success but was defeated during the Battle of New Orleans by the forces of General Jackson in 1815. The regiment then returned to Europe. The 43rd arrived in Belgium too late to fight in the Battle of Waterloo on 18 June 1815. There were however a number of 43rd officers present during the battle including Lord Fitzroy Somerset and Major James Shaw Kennedy who both served on the Duke of Wellington's staff. The regiment formed part of the army of occupation in France until November 1818.

=== Canada 1836–1846 ===
The regiment served in Ireland from 1819 to 1823 and then at Gibraltar from 1823 to 1830. Following a period in England the 43rd returned to Canada in 1836. The regiment under the overall command of Sir John Colborne commander-in-chief Canada took part in the suppression of the Rebellions of 1837. In December 1837, in severe weather conditions, the regiment marched from Fredericton to Quebec a distance of 370 miles of many forests, frozen rivers and mountainous terrain in a period of eighteen days. The march received much attention in Canada and the Duke of Wellington expressed his high admiration for the arduous undertaking the 43rd had completed. The regiment left Canada for England in 1846 and was stationed in the south of England and then in Ireland until 1851.

=== Southern Africa 1851–1853 ===
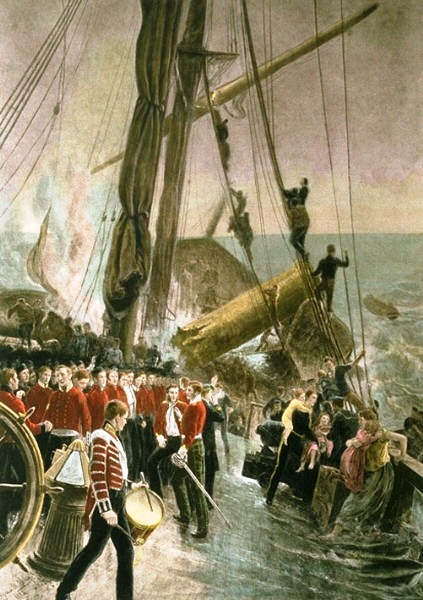
The regiment assembling onboard the sinking HMS Birkenhead

The 43rd were sent to South Africa for service in the Eighth Xhosa War in 1851. In 1852 a detachment from the regiment departed Simon's Town aboard the troopship HMS Birkenhead bound for Port Elizabeth. At two o'clock in the morning on 28 February 1852, the ship struck rocks at Danger Point, just off Gansbaai. The troops assembled on deck, and allowed the women and children to board the lifeboats first, but then stood firm as the ship sank when told by officers that jumping overboard and swimming to the lifeboats would mostly likely upset those boats and endanger the civilian passengers. 357 men drowned. The bravery and discipline shown by British troops which included a detachment of the 43rd under the command of Lieutenant Girardot during the ship-wreck received much publicity in England and abroad. King Frederick of Prussia ordered that the story of the bravery shown during the sinking of the troopship be read out to each regiment of his army as an example of devotion to duty.

=== Indian Mutiny ===
The 43rd moved from South Africa to India arriving at Madras in January 1854. The regiment assisted in putting down the Indian Mutiny from 1857 to 1859. In the campaign, the regiment marched 1,300 miles in six months; from Southern India to Bengal and engaged in many actions with the enemy along the way. The regiment also won its first Victoria Cross awarded to Henry Addison in 1859.

=== New Zealand Wars ===
In September 1863, the 43rd left India to take part in the New Zealand Wars. The 43rd led the storming column at Gate Pa in April 1864 and took part in the assault on the fort at Te Ranga in June 1864. Frederick Augustus Smith was awarded the Victoria Cross for his bravery during an attack on a Maori trench. The regiment returned to England in February 1866.

=== Later history ===
For the next fifteen years the regiment was mainly stationed abroad with only brief periods spent in the UK. The major operation it was engaged in during this time was in the suppression of the rebellion by the Moplahs in Southern India in 1873.

As part of the Cardwell Reforms of the 1870s, where single-battalion regiments were linked together to share a single depot and recruiting district in the United Kingdom, the 43rd was linked with the 53rd (Shropshire) Regiment of Foot, and assigned to district no. 21 at Copthorne Barracks in Shrewsbury. On 1 July 1881 the Childers Reforms came into effect and the regiment amalgamated with the 52nd (Oxfordshire) Regiment of Foot (Light Infantry) to form the 1st and 2nd battalions of the Oxfordshire Light Infantry (which became the Oxfordshire and Buckinghamshire Light Infantry in 1908).

== Battle honours ==
- Quebec 1759, Martinique 1762, Havannah
- Peninsular War: Vimiera, Corunna, Busaco, Fuentes d'Onor, Ciudad Rodrigo, Badajoz, Salamanca, Vittoria, Nivelle, Nive, Peninsula
- Napoleonic Wars: Toulouse
- New Zealand Wars: New Zealand
- South Africa 1851-2-3 (awarded to successor regiment, 1882)
- Martinique 1794 (awarded to successor regiment, 1909)
- Pyrenees (awarded to successor regiment, 1910)

== Victoria Cross recipients ==
- Henry Addison was awarded the VC in 1859 for his involvement in the Indian Mutiny.
- Frederick Augustus Smith received the VC in 1864 for his part in the New Zealand Land Wars.

== Colonels of the Regiment ==
Colonels of the regiment included:

- 1741: Lt-Gen. Thomas Fowke
- 1741–1746: Brig-Gen William Graham
- 1746–1761: Lt-Gen. James Kennedy

=== The 43rd Regiment of Foot - (1751) ===
- 1761–1762: Maj-Gen. Hon. Sharrington Talbot
- 1762–1766: Lt-Gen. Bennet Noel
- 1766–1792: Gen. Hon. George Carey

=== 43rd (Monmouthshire) Regiment of Foot (Light Infantry) - (1803) ===
- 1792–1809: Gen Edward Smith
- 1809–1839: Gen Rt Hon Sir John Cradock, 1st Baron Howden, KB KC
- 1839–1844: Lt-Gen. Rt. Hon. Sir John Keane, 1st Baron Keane of Ghuznee, GCB, GCH
- 1844–1850: Lt-Gen. Hon. Sir Hercules Robert Pakenham, KCB
- 1850–1865: Gen. Sir James Fergusson, GCB
- 1865–1866: Gen. Sir James Frederick Love, GCB, KH
- 1866–1869: Lt-Gen. Sir Robert Garrett, KCB, KH
- 1869–1881: Gen. Hon. Sir Augustus Almeric Spencer, GCB

== See also ==
- British Army during the Napoleonic Wars
- Sable Island - where the officers and men of the Regiment were shipwrecked in 1760

== Sources ==
- Booth, Philip (1971). Oxfordshire and Buckinghamshire Light Infantry (Famous Regiments). Leo Cooper. ISBN 978-0850520293.
- Draper, Robin Anthony (2015). Redcoats to Riflemen: A Short History of the Oxfordshire and Buckinghamshire County Regiment. Royal Green Jackets Museum Trust. ISBN 978-0954937034.
- Levinge, Sir Richard (2014). Historical Records of the 43rd Regiment Monmouthshire Light Infantry. (Oxfordshire and Buckinghamshire Light Infantry). Naval and Military Press. ISBN 978-1781519516.
- Newbolt, Sir Henry (1915). The Story of the Oxfordshire and Buckinghamshire Light Infantry (The old 43rd and 52nd Regiments). New York: Charles Scribner's Sons. OCLC 9236721.
- May, Robin (1974). The British Army in North America 1775–1783. Fulham, London, United Kingdom: Osprey Military Publishing. ISBN 978-1855327351. OCLC 224036375.
