= Charles Montagu (British Army officer) =

British Army general

Lieutenant-General Sir Charles Montagu KB
- Died: 1 August 1777
- Military career
- Allegiance: Kingdom of Great Britain
- Branch: British Army
- Rank: Lieutenant-General
- Awards: Knight of the Order of the Bath

Lieutenant-General Sir Charles Montagu KB (died 1 August 1777) was a British Army officer.

He was the son of Brigadier-General Edward Montagu, colonel of the 11th Foot and Governor of Hull, nephew of George Montagu, 1st Earl of Halifax, and great-nephew to the celebrated minister Charles Montagu, 1st Earl of Halifax. He had an elder brother, Edward, who was killed at the Battle of Fontenoy, being then lieutenant-colonel of the 31st Foot.

Montagu attained the rank of colonel in the Army on 30 November 1755, major-general on 25 June 1759, colonel of the 2nd (The Queen's Royal) Regiment of Foot on 27 November 1760, and lieutenant-general on 19 January 1761.

Military offices
| New regiment | Colonel of the 61st Regiment of Foot renumbered the 59th in 1756; 1755–1760 | Succeeded by John Owen |
| Preceded by John Fitzwilliam | Colonel of the 2nd (Queen's Royal) Regiment of Foot; 1760–1777 | Succeeded by Daniel Jones |
