= Karariya =

- village
- Location within Madhya Pradesh Location within India
- Coordinates: 23.658757°N 77.471467°E
- Country: India
- State: Madhya Pradesh
- District: Bhopal
- Tehsil: Berasia

Population (2011)
  - Total: 995
- Time zone: UTC+5:30 (IST)
- ISO 3166 code: MP-IN
- Census code: 482200

Karariya is a village in the Bhopal district of Madhya Pradesh, India. It is located in the Berasia tehsil.

== Demographics ==
According to the 2011 census of India, Karariya has 212 households. The effective literacy rate (i.e. the literacy rate of population excluding children aged 6 and below) is 66.92%.

Demographics (2011 Census)
	Total	Male	Female
Population	995	523	472
Children aged below 6 years	197	96	101
Scheduled caste	500	265	235
Scheduled tribe	4	2	2
Literates	534	343	191
Workers (all)	509	287	222
Main workers (total)	97	70	27
Main workers: Cultivators	71	52	19
Main workers: Agricultural labourers	16	10	6
Main workers: Household industry workers	1	1	0
Main workers: Other	9	7	2
Marginal workers (total)	412	217	195
Marginal workers: Cultivators	14	11	3
Marginal workers: Agricultural labourers	296	140	156
Marginal workers: Household industry workers	84	54	30
Marginal workers: Others	18	12	6
Non-workers	486	236	250
