= Gunstone =

Hamlet in Staffordshire, England

Coordinates: 52.6389°N 2.1900°W

- Location within Staffordshire
- District: South Staffordshire
- Shire county: Staffordshire
- Region: West Midlands
- Country: England
- Sovereign state: United Kingdom
- Post town: Wolverhampton
- Postcode district: WV8
- Dialling code: 01902
- Police: Staffordshire
- Fire: Staffordshire
- Ambulance: West Midlands

Gunstone is a hamlet in the South Staffordshire district of Staffordshire, England. It is situated north east of the village of Codsall.

== Place name and location ==
Gunstone was first recorded in 1186 as Gonestona. Toponymists think that the name comes from a combination of an Old Norse personal name, Gunni or Gunnr, along with the Old English word tūn, giving the enclosure or farmstead of Gunni. In early English times, Gunstone sat just a few miles south of border of the Danelaw at Watling Street - the area of England under Danish control.

The settlement is based around Whitehouse Lane, with Pendeford in Wolverhampton to the east and Codsall Wood to the west. The Moat Brook, a tributary of the River Penk, passes through Gunstone, occasionally flooding sections of Whitehouse Lane after a period of sustained rain.

A Roman road ran south through this area from Pennocrucium in the direction of Greensforge.

== Today ==
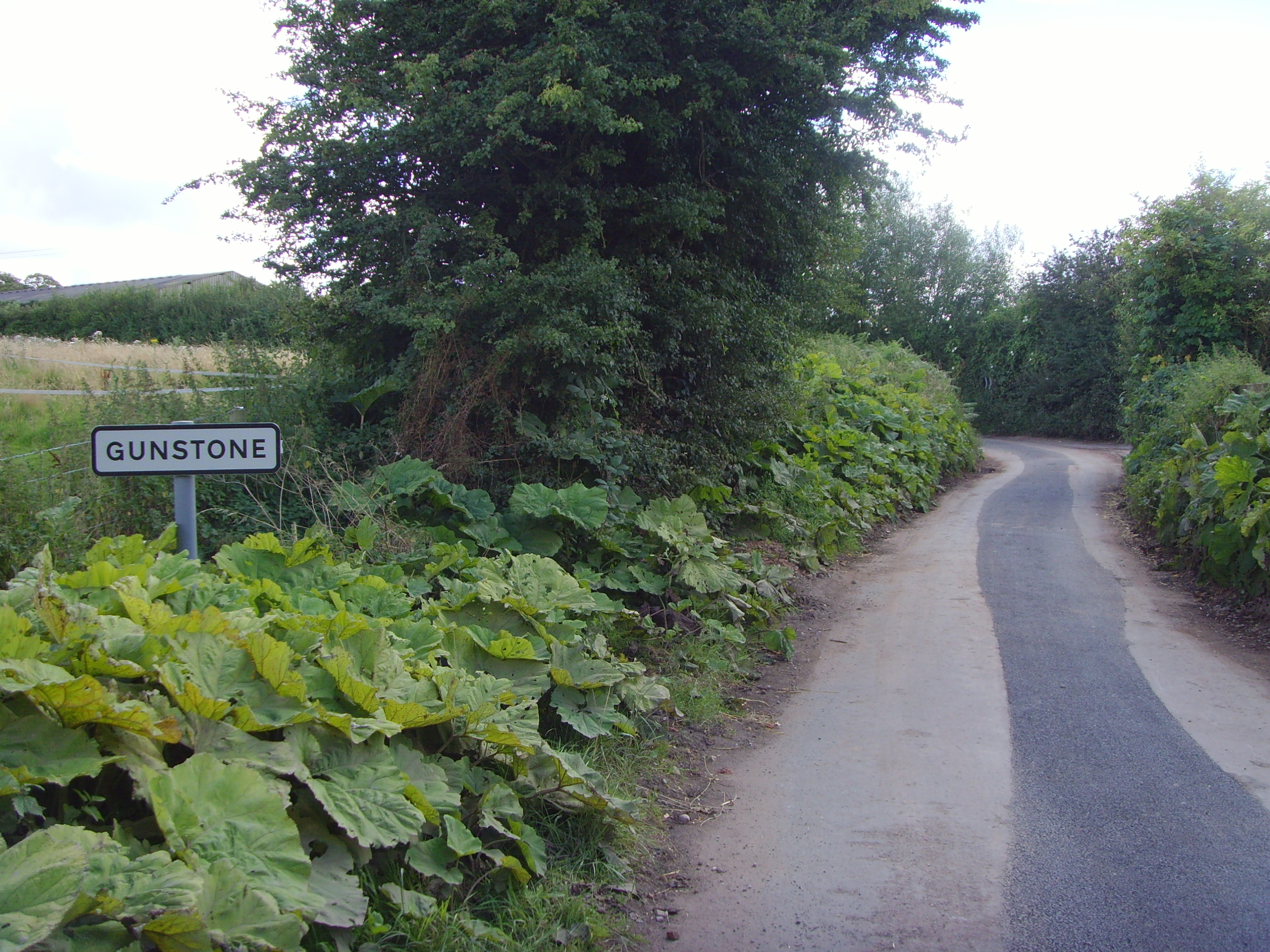
Whitehouse Lane, Gunstone

Gunstone has changed little in the 20th century, and it is still very much a rural hamlet, flanked by fields and farms, despite its proximity to nearby Wolverhampton. (Gunstone is 2 miles from the city's north western border.)

Gunstone Hall Equestrian is a livery yard based in Gunstone, run by Samantha and William Fish.

Alongside the Staffordshire Way route - a bridleway that passes through the area, is Gunstone Farm. In July 2010 the farm listed traditional farm buildings for sale through Smiths Gore, with full planning consent for conversion to residential dwellings.
