= Richard Cannon =

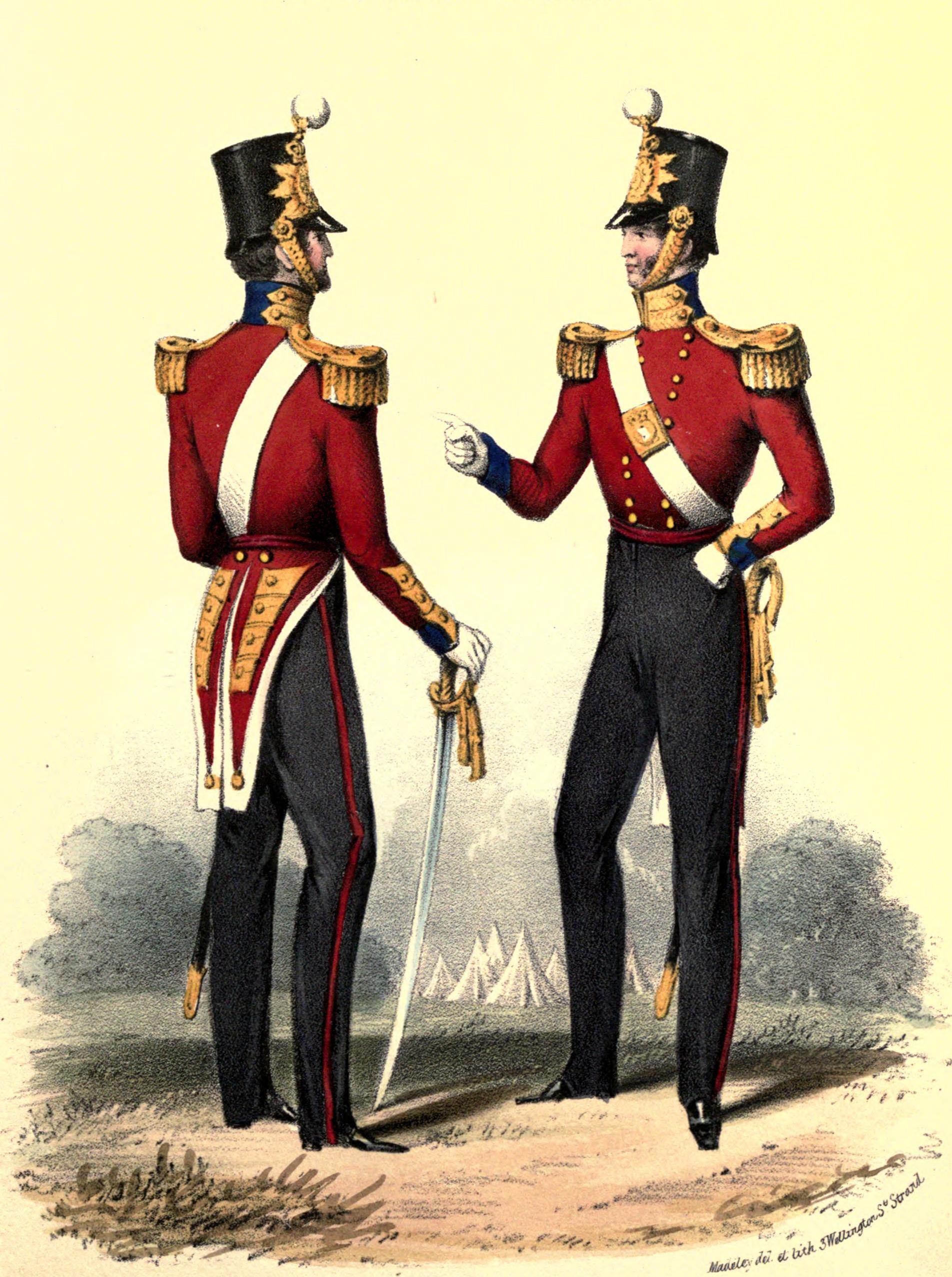
Illustration from Cannon's Historical Record of the Eighteenth, or the Royal Irish Regiment of Foot

Richard Cannon (1779–1865) was a compiler of regimental records for the British Army.

== Career ==
On 1 January 1802 Cannon was appointed to a clerkship at the Horse Guards, and attained the grade of first-clerk in 1803.

Under a Horse Guards order, dated 1 January 1836, signifying the royal commands that an historic account of the services of every regiment in the British Army should be published under the superintendence of the Adjutant-General, the work of compilation was entrusted to Cannon, at that time principal clerk in the Adjutant-General's office. During the ensuing seventeen years historical records of all then existing regiments of cavalry, and of forty-two regiments of infantry of the line, were thus issued "by authority", all of which were prepared under Cannon's direction, except the history of the Royal Horse Guards (issued as part of the series in 1847), which was written by Captain Edmund Packe, of that regiment.

After nearly 52 years of service, Cannon retired in January 1854, on his full salary of £800 a year. The work of compilation was then discontinued, some regimental histories which had been announced as in preparation at various times having, apparently, not been proceeded with.
