= 1772 =

1772 in various calendars
- Gregorian calendar: 1772; MDCCLXXII
- Ab urbe condita: 2525
- Armenian calendar: 1221; ԹՎ ՌՄԻԱ
- Assyrian calendar: 6522
- Balinese saka calendar: 1693–1694
- Bengali calendar: 1178–1179
- Berber calendar: 2722
- British Regnal year: 12 Geo. 3 – 13 Geo. 3
- Buddhist calendar: 2316
- Burmese calendar: 1134
- Byzantine calendar: 7280–7281
- Chinese calendar: 辛卯年 (Metal Rabbit); 4469 or 4262 — to — 壬辰年 (Water Dragon); 4470 or 4263
- Coptic calendar: 1488–1489
- Discordian calendar: 2938
- Ethiopian calendar: 1764–1765
- Hebrew calendar: 5532–5533
- Hindu calendars
- Vikram Samvat: 1828–1829
- Shaka Samvat: 1693–1694
- Kali Yuga: 4872–4873
- Holocene calendar: 11772
- Igbo calendar: 772–773
- Iranian calendar: 1150–1151
- Islamic calendar: 1185–1186
- Japanese calendar: Meiwa 9 / An'ei 1 (安永元年)
- Javanese calendar: 1697–1698
- Julian calendar: Gregorian minus 11 days
- Korean calendar: 4105
- Minguo calendar: 140 before ROC 民前140年
- Nanakshahi calendar: 304
- Thai solar calendar: 2314–2315
- Tibetan calendar: ལྕགས་མོ་ཡོས་ལོ་ (female Iron-Hare); 1898 or 1517 or 745 — to — ཆུ་ཕོ་འབྲུག་ལོ་ (male Water-Dragon); 1899 or 1518 or 746

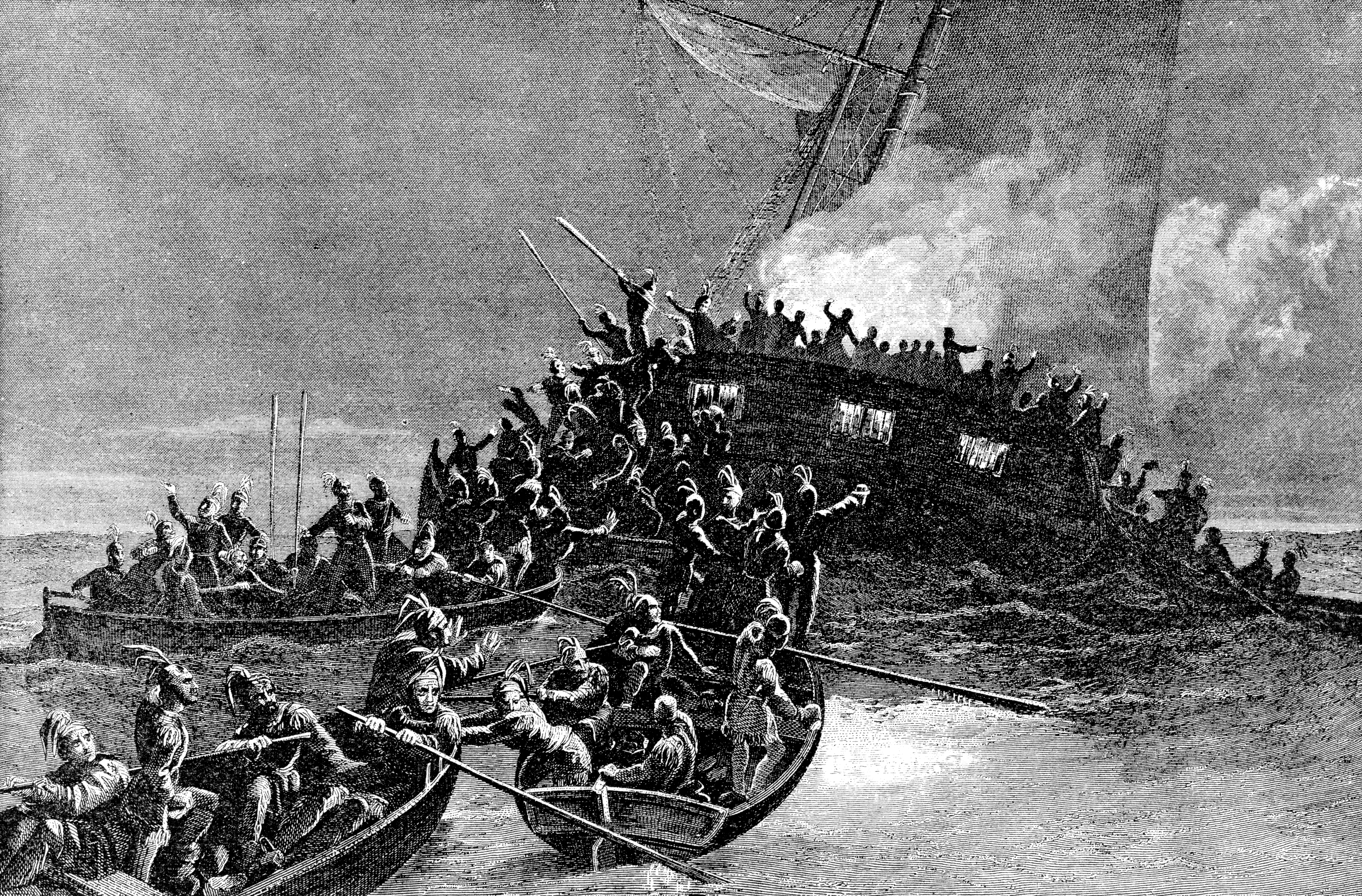
June 9: American protesters burn British ship HMS Gaspee.

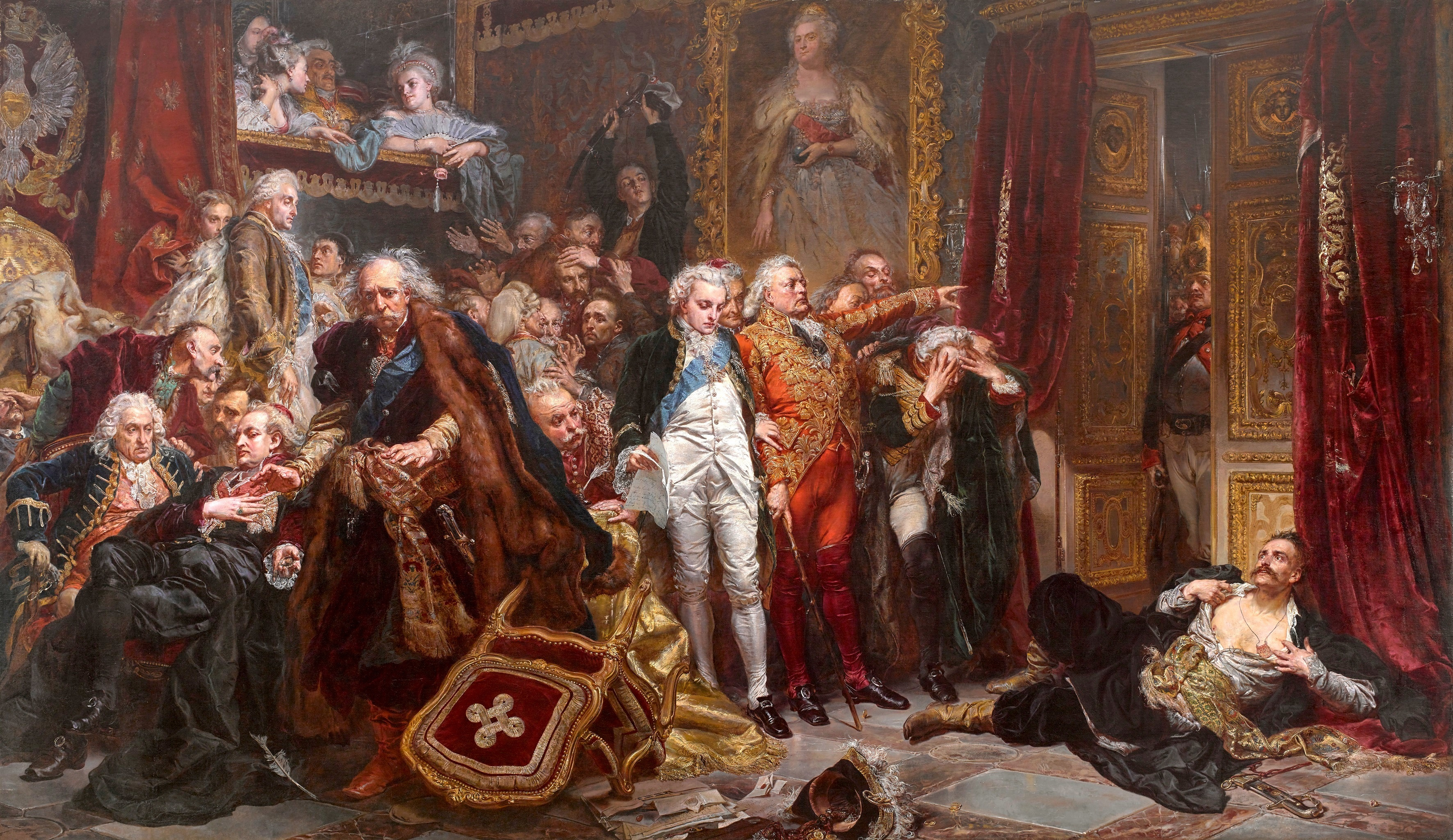
August 5: First Partition of Poland

1772 (MDCCLXXII) was a leap year starting on Wednesday of the Gregorian calendar and a leap year starting on Sunday of the Julian calendar, the 1772nd year of the Common Era (CE) and Anno Domini (AD) designations, the 772nd year of the 2nd millennium, the 72nd year of the 18th century, and the 3rd year of the 1770s decade. As of the start of 1772, the Gregorian calendar was 11 days ahead of the Julian calendar, which remained in localized use until 1923.

== Events ==
=== January–March ===
- January 10 – Shah Alam II, the Mughal Emperor of India, makes a triumphant return to Delhi 15 years after having been forced to flee.
- January 17 – Johann Friedrich Struensee and Queen Caroline Matilda are arrested, leading to his execution and her banishment from Denmark.
- February 12
  - Breton-French explorer Yves-Joseph de Kerguelen-Trémarec discovers the uninhabited Kerguelen Islands in the Southern Indian Ocean.
  - The Virginia Assembly amends an act to describe the punishments for the practice of gouging.
- February 17 – The First Partition of Poland is agreed to by Russia and Prussia, later including Austria.
- March 8 – Biela's Comet is first discovered by French astronomer Jacques Leibax Montaigne, but not proven to be a periodic comet until 1826, when Wilhelm von Biela correctly identifies its return.
- March 20 – Pedro Fages, the Spanish Governor of Alta California, and Juan Crespí, a Catholic priest, set off from the capital at Monterey with a party of 12 soldiers and begin the first European exploration of the lands around San Francisco Bay.

=== April–June ===
- April 8 – Massachusetts legislator Samuel Adams persuades his colleagues to approve his plan for creating a Committee of Correspondence to begin a dialogue with the other American colonies concerning mutual problems with England.
- April 13 – Warren Hastings begins his service for the British East India Company as Governor of Bengal, arriving at the company's headquarters at Fort William, outside of Calcutta, and including what are now parts of northeast India and Bangladesh. Hastings serves for two years, then later becomes Governor-General of India.
- May 8 – The Watauga Association Compact is signed in what is now East Tennessee by a group of white settlers led by William Bean, creating the first non-colonial government body in British North America.
- June 9 – Gaspee Affair: In an act of defiance against the British Navigation Acts, American patriots, led by Abraham Whipple, attack and burn the British customs schooner HMS Gaspee off of Rhode Island.
- June 10 – The crisis of 1772 is triggered when, following the flight of their partner Alexander Fordyce to France, the London banking house of Neal, James, Fordyce and Down (which has been speculating in East India Company stock) suspends payment. The resultant panic causes other banks to fail, extends to Scotland, Amsterdam and the Thirteen Colonies and threatens the East India Company with bankruptcy.
- June 22 – Somersett's Case: Lord Mansfield, the Lord Chief Justice of England and Wales, delivers the decision that leads to the end of slavery in England.
- June 23–28 – Russo-Turkish War (1768–1774): First of two Russian occupations of Beirut, following a naval bombardment which began on June 18.

=== July–September ===
- July 13 – The second voyage of James Cook departs from Plymouth on Captain Cook's new ship, HMS Resolution and the companion ship HMS Adventure in an attempt to prove the existence of an uncharted continent even further south than New Zealand.
- August 5 – The first Partition of the Polish–Lithuanian Commonwealth begins. The Kingdom of Galicia and Lodomeria becomes part of the crown lands of the Habsburg monarchy.
- August 12 – The volcano Mount Papandayan in West Java erupts and partially collapses, the debris avalanche killing several thousand.
- August 21 – A coup d'état by King Gustav III is completed by adopting a new Constitution, ending half a century of parliamentary rule in Sweden, and making him an enlightened despot.
- September 1 – Mission San Luis Obispo de Tolosa is founded in San Luis Obispo, California.

=== October–December ===
- October 28 – Basque-Spanish explorer Domingo de Bonechea, in the Aguila, sights Tauere atoll, which he names San Simon y Judas.
- November 2 – American Revolutionary War: Samuel Adams and Joseph Warren form the first Committee of Correspondence.
- December 14
  - Russian government offices reopen at Moscow and Saint Petersburg after being closed for 15 months because of an epidemic of bubonic plague.
  - Second voyage of James Cook: The crew of HMS Resolution finds that the ice floes encountered on their journey south are a source of fresh water, a "discovery... of utmost importance to the success of the voyage."

=== Date unknown ===
- Scottish scientist Daniel Rutherford discovers nitrogen gas, isolating it from air.
- Frederick II, Duke of Mecklenburg-Schwerin, demands that all bodies remain unburied for three days to ensure that death has actually taken place.

== Births ==
- January 20 – Angélique Brûlon, French soldier, first female Knight of the French Legion of Honour (d. 1859)
- January 30 – Godfrey Higgins, British archaeologist (d. 1833)
- February 24 – William H. Crawford, American politician, judge (d. 1834)
- March 10 – Friedrich von Schlegel, German poet (d. 1829)
- March 15 – József Ficzkó, Burgenland Croatian writer (d. 1843)
- April 4 – Nachman of Breslov, Hasidic rabbi and founder of the Breslov Hasidic movement (d. 1810)
- April 5 – Domenico Puccini, Italian composer (d. 1815)
- April 7 – Charles Fourier, French philosopher (d. 1837)
- April 18 – David Ricardo, British economist (d. 1823)
- April 30 – Karl Gustav Himly, German surgeon, ophthalmologist (d. 1837)
- May 2 – Novalis, German poet (d. 1801)
- May 20 – William Congreve, British rocket pioneer (d. 1828)
- May 22 – Ram Mohan Roy, Hindu religious and social reformer (d. 1833)
- June 7 – Aurora Liljenroth, Swedish scholar (d. 1836)
- July 11 – John Rodgers, American naval officer (d. 1838)
- August 2 – Louis Antoine, Duke of Enghien (d. 1804)
- August 15 – Johann Nepomuk Mälzel, German inventor (d. 1838)

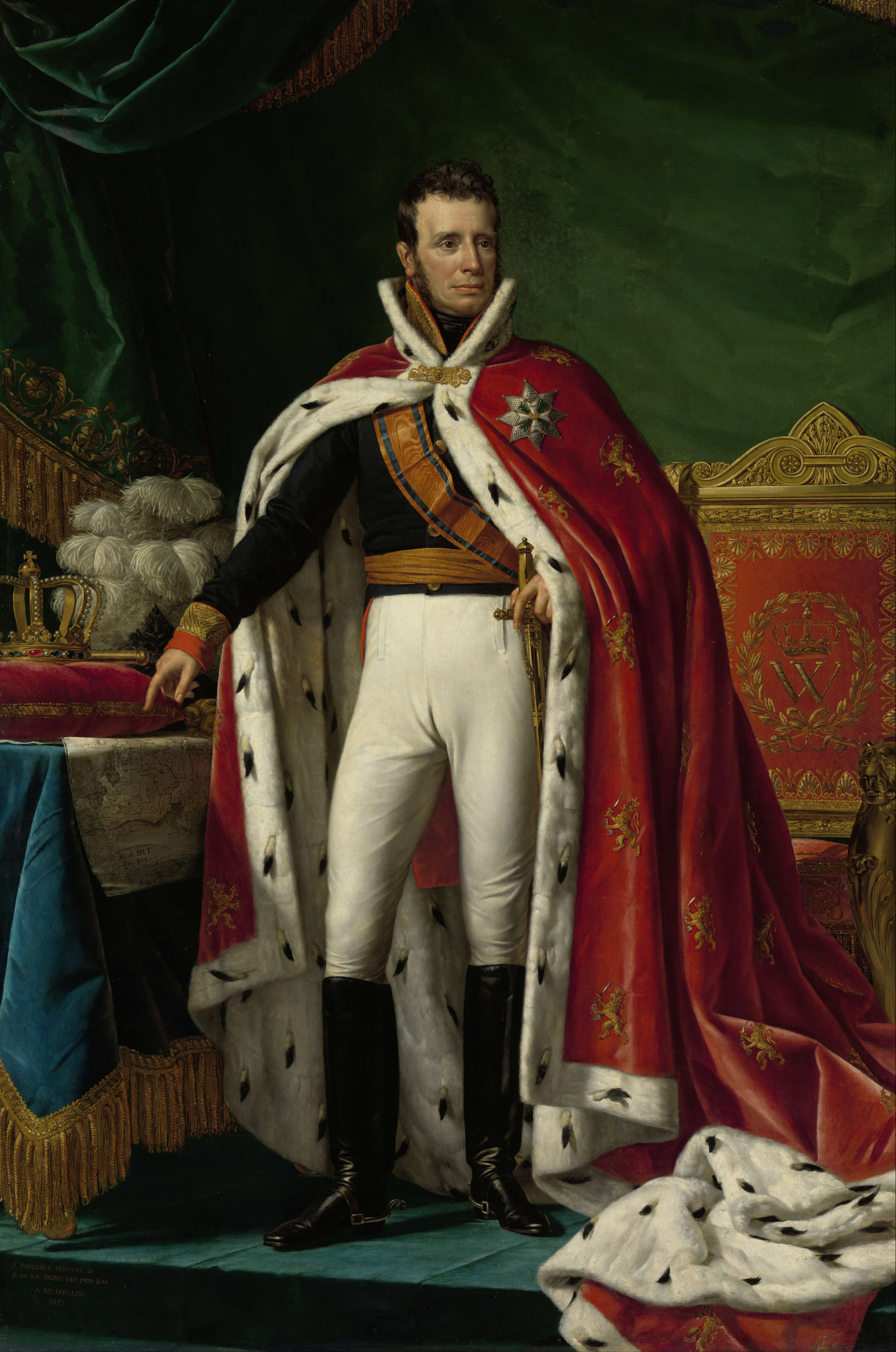
William I of the Netherlands

- August 24 – King William I of the Netherlands (d. 1843)
- September 27 – Martha Jefferson Randolph, Acting First Lady of the United States (1801–1809) (d. 1836)
- October 6 – Anna Maria Rüttimann-Meyer von Schauensee, politically active Swiss salonist (d. 1856)

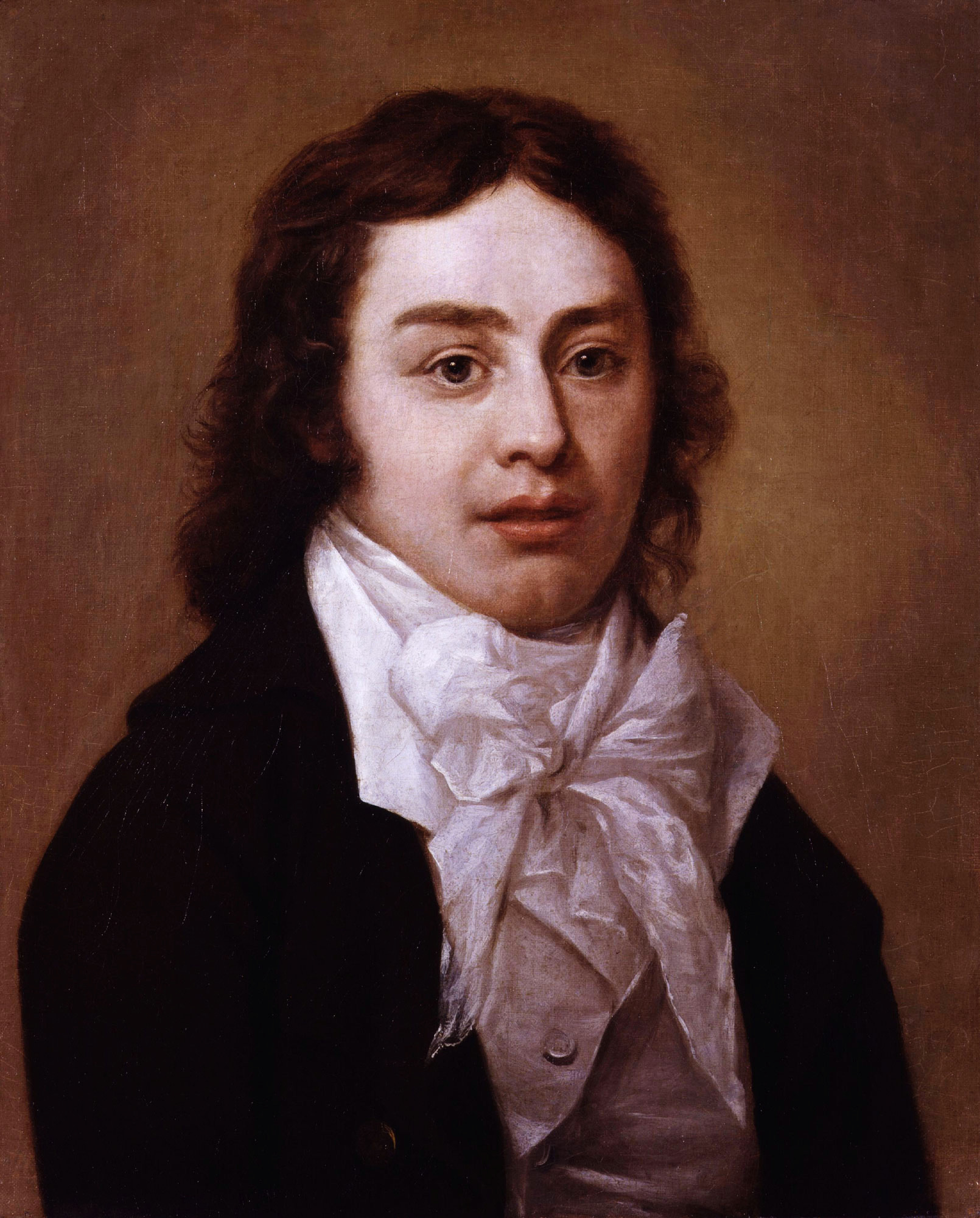
Samuel Taylor Coleridge

- October 21 – Samuel Taylor Coleridge, English poet and philosopher (d. 1834)
- October 25 – Géraud Duroc, French general (d. 1813)
- November 5 – Pierre Roch Jurien de La Gravière, French admiral (d. 1849)
- November 8 – William Wirt, 9th United States Attorney General (d. 1834)
- November 18 – Louis Ferdinand of Prussia, German prince (d. 1806)
- date unknown
  - Thomas Noble, English poet and translator (d. 1837)
  - Tuanku Imam Bonjol, Indonesian religious and military leader (d. 1864)
- approximate date
  - Charlotte Dacre, English Gothic novelist (d. 1825)
  - Lalon, Bengali philosopher, Baul saint, mystic, songwriter, social reformer and thinker (d. 1890)

== Deaths ==
- February 4 – Princess Victoria Charlotte of Anhalt-Zeitz-Hoym, Margravine of Brandenburg-Bayreuth (b. 1715)
- February 8 – Princess Augusta of Saxe-Gotha, Princess of Wales (b. 1719)
- February 11 – Caterina Sagredo Barbarigo, Venetian aristocrat and salon holder (b. 1715)
- February 15 – Mitromaras, Greek rebel and pirate
- February 18 – Count Johann Hartwig Ernst von Bernstorff, Danish statesman (b. 1712)
- February 20 – Princess Maria Theresia of Liechtenstein (b. 1694)
- March 21 – Jacques-Nicolas Bellin, French cartographer (b. 1703)
- March 22 – John Canton, English physicist (b. 1718)
- March 26 – Charles Pinot Duclos, French writer (b. 1704)
- March 27 – Taylor White, British judge (b. 1701)

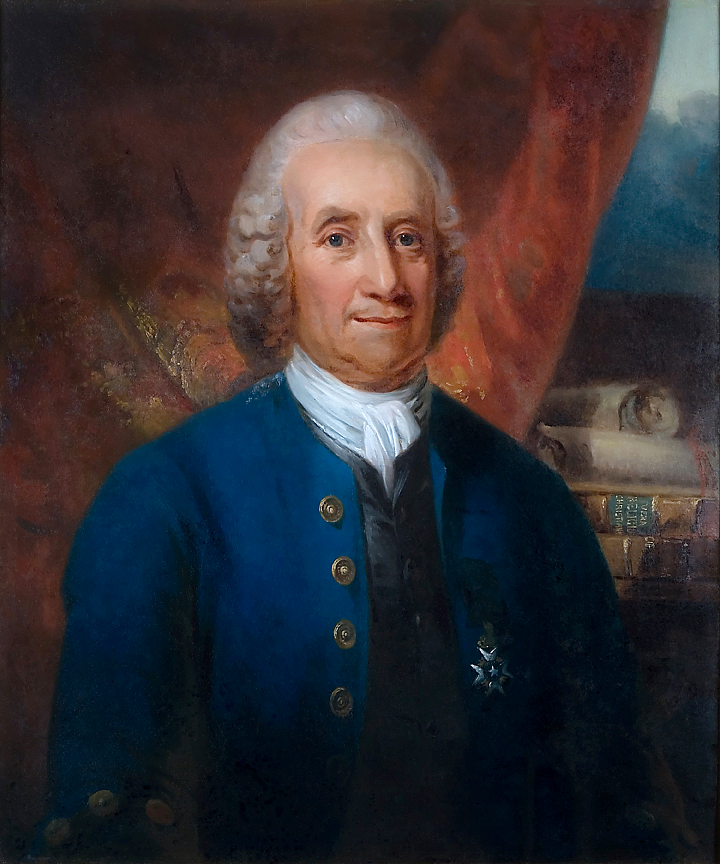
Emanuel Swedenborg

- March 29 – Emanuel Swedenborg, Swedish philosopher and mathematician (b. 1688)
- April 28 – Johann Friedrich Struensee, Danish royal physician and de facto regent, executed (b. 1737)
- May 1 – Gottfried Achenwall, German statistician (b. 1719)
- May 22 – Durastante Natalucci, Italian historian (b. 1687)
- June 15 – Louis-Claude Daquin, French composer (b. 1694)
- June 18
  - Gerard van Swieten, Dutch-born Austrian physician (b. 1700)
  - Johann Ulrich von Cramer, German judge, philosopher (b. 1706)
- June 22 – François-Vincent Toussaint, French writer most famous for Les Mœurs (The Manners) (b. 1715)
- August 31 – William Borlase, English naturalist (b. 1695)
- September 30 – James Brindley, English canal builder (b. 1716)
- October 7 – John Woolman, American Quaker preacher, abolitionist (b. 1720)

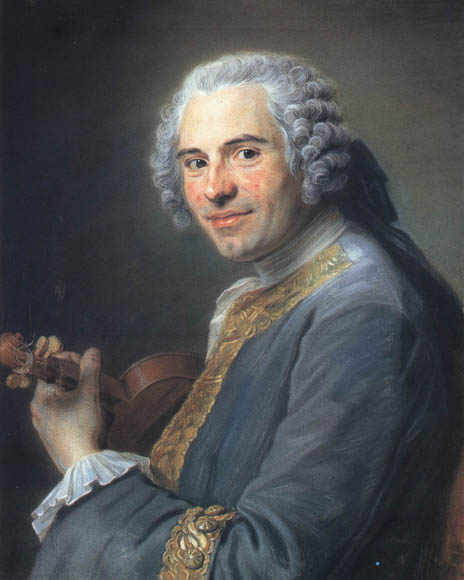
Jean-Joseph de Mondonville

- October 8 – Jean-Joseph de Mondonville, French violinist, composer (b. 1711)
- October 14 – Benjamin Green, Canadian merchant and judge (b. 1713)
- October 16 – Ahmad Shah Durrani, Afghan founder of the Durrani Empire (cancer) (b. 1724)
- October 19 – Andrea Belli, Maltese architect, businessman (b. 1703)
- November 10 – Pedro Antonio Joaquim Correa da Serra Garção, Portuguese poet (b. 1724)
- November 18 – Madhavrao I, ruler of India (b. 1745)
- November 19 – William Nelson, American colonial governor of Virginia (b. 1711)
- December 4 – Dov Ber of Mezeritch, the Great Maggid, a preacher and founder of Hasidism.
- December 7 – Martín Sarmiento, Spanish writer, scholar (b. 1695)
- date unknown – Panna Cinka, Hungarian violinist (b. 1711)
