= 1837 =

1837 in various calendars
- Gregorian calendar: 1837; MDCCCXXXVII
- Ab urbe condita: 2590
- Armenian calendar: 1286; ԹՎ ՌՄՁԶ
- Assyrian calendar: 6587
- Balinese saka calendar: 1758–1759
- Bengali calendar: 1243–1244
- Berber calendar: 2787
- British Regnal year: 7 Will. 4 – 1 Vict. 1
- Buddhist calendar: 2381
- Burmese calendar: 1199
- Byzantine calendar: 7345–7346
- Chinese calendar: 丙申年 (Fire Monkey); 4534 or 4327 — to — 丁酉年 (Fire Rooster); 4535 or 4328
- Coptic calendar: 1553–1554
- Discordian calendar: 3003
- Ethiopian calendar: 1829–1830
- Hebrew calendar: 5597–5598
- Hindu calendars
- Vikram Samvat: 1893–1894
- Shaka Samvat: 1758–1759
- Kali Yuga: 4937–4938
- Holocene calendar: 11837
- Igbo calendar: 837–838
- Iranian calendar: 1215–1216
- Islamic calendar: 1252–1253
- Japanese calendar: Tenpō 8 (天保８年)
- Javanese calendar: 1764–1765
- Julian calendar: Gregorian minus 12 days
- Korean calendar: 4170
- Minguo calendar: 75 before ROC 民前75年
- Nanakshahi calendar: 369
- Thai solar calendar: 2379–2380
- Tibetan calendar: མེ་ཕོ་སྤྲེ་ལོ་ (male Fire-Monkey); 1963 or 1582 or 810 — to — མེ་མོ་བྱ་ལོ་ (female Fire-Bird); 1964 or 1583 or 811

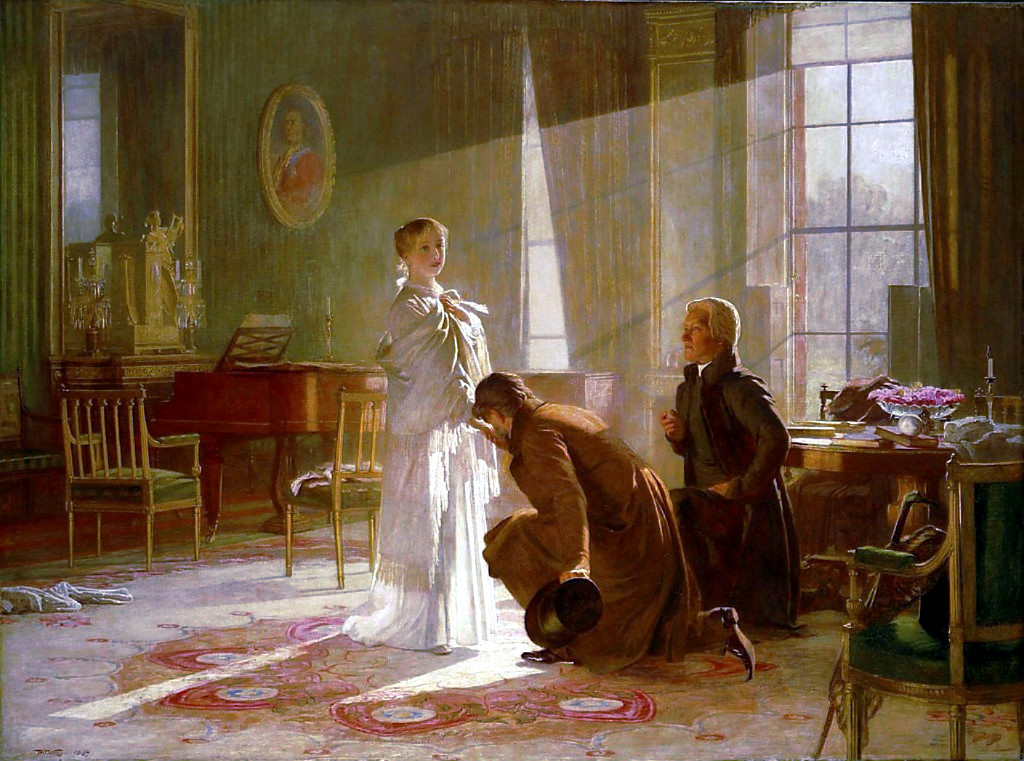
June 20: Queen Victoria accedes to the British throne.

1837 (MDCCCXXXVII) was a common year starting on Sunday of the Gregorian calendar and a common year starting on Friday of the Julian calendar, the 1837th year of the Common Era (CE) and Anno Domini (AD) designations, the 837th year of the 2nd millennium, the 37th year of the 19th century, and the 8th year of the 1830s decade. As of the start of 1837, the Gregorian calendar was 12 days ahead of the Julian calendar, which remained in localized use until 1923.

== Events ==
=== January–March ===
- January 1 – The destructive Galilee earthquake causes thousands of deaths in Ottoman Syria.
- January 26 – Michigan becomes the 26th state admitted to the United States.
- February 4 – Seminoles attack Fort Foster in Florida.
- February 25 – In Philadelphia, the Institute for Colored Youth (ICY) is founded, as the first institution for the higher education of black people in the United States.
- February – Charles Dickens's Oliver Twist begins publication in serial form in London.
- March 1 – The Congregation of Holy Cross is formed in Le Mans, France, by the signing of the Fundamental Act of Union, which legally joins the Auxiliary Priests of Blessed Basil Moreau, CSC, and the Brothers of St. Joseph (founded by Jacques-François Dujarié) into one religious association.

=== April–June ===
- April 12 – The conglomerate of Procter & Gamble has its origins, when British-born businessmen William Procter and James Gamble begin selling their first manufactured goods (soap and candles) in Cincinnati, Ohio.
- April 24 – The great fire in Surat, a city of India, begins. Over a three-day period, the fire kills more than 500 people and destroys more than 9,000 houses.
- May 10 – The Panic of 1837 begins in New York City.
- May – W. F. Cooke and Charles Wheatstone patent an electrical telegraph system.
- June 5 – The city of Houston is incorporated by the Republic of Texas.
- June 11 – The Broad Street Riot occurs in Boston, Massachusetts, fueled by ethnic tensions between the Irish and the Yankees.
- June 20 – Queen Victoria, 18, accedes to the throne of the United Kingdom, on the death of her uncle King William IV without legitimate heirs (she will reign for more than 63 years). Under Salic law, the Kingdom of Hanover passes to William's brother, Ernest Augustus, Duke of Cumberland, ending the personal union of Britain and Hanover which has persisted since 1714.

=== July–September ===
- July 13 – Queen Victoria moves from Kensington Palace into Buckingham Palace, the first reigning British monarch to make this, rather than St James's Palace, as her London home.
- July – Charles W. King sets sail on the American merchant ship Morrison. In the Morrison incident, he is turned away from Japanese ports with cannon fire.
- August 16 – The Dutch colonial forces sack the fortress of Bonjol, Indonesia, ending the Padri War.
- September 19 – First Carlist War: Battle of Aranzueque – The liberal forces loyal to Queen Isabel II of Spain are victorious, ending the Carlist campaign known as the Expedición Real.
- September 26 – The destructive "Racer's hurricane" sweeps across the Caribbean, northeastern Mexico, the Republic of Texas and the Gulf Coast of the United States and lasts until October 9, after killing at least 105 people.
- September 28 – Samuel Morse files a caveat for a patent for the telegraph.

=== October–December ===
- October 13 – The French army under Sylvain Charles Valée captures the city of Constantine in French Algeria after a siege of three days.
- October 30 – The Tsarskoye Selo Railway, the first in the Russian Empire, opens between Saint Petersburg Tsarskoselsky station and Tsarskoye Selo (modern-day Pushkin), engineered by Franz Anton von Gerstner.
- October 31 – In what will become the world's leading consumer goods brand, Procter & Gamble is founded in Ohio in the United States.
- November 6 Louis-Joseph Papineau begins the Lower Canada Rebellion in the Quebec city of Montreal.
- November 7 – American abolitionist and newspaper editor Elijah Lovejoy is killed by a pro-slavery mob, at his warehouse in Alton, Illinois.
- November 8 – Mount Holyoke Female Seminary, later Mount Holyoke College, is founded in South Hadley, Massachusetts.
- November 17 – An earthquake in Valdivia, south-central Chile, causes tsunamis that led to significant destruction along Japan's coast.
- November 20 – The Prussian king has Clemens August Droste zu Vischering, archbishop of Cologne, arrested over differences concerning the treatment of mixed protestant-catholic marriages. The archbishop remains in custody for over a year.
- December 4 – Samuel Lount begins the Upper Canada Rebellion by marching with rebel followers to Toronto, one month after a similar rebellion against British rule had begun in Lower Canada.
- December 17 – Fire breaks out in the Winter Palace, in Saint Petersburg, Russia killing 30 guards.
- December 23 – The Slave Compensation Act is signed into law by the government of the United Kingdom. This pays a substantial amount of money, constituting 40% of the Treasury’s tax receipts at the time, to former enslavers but nothing to those formerly enslaved.
- December 29 – The Caroline Affair, on the Niagara River, becomes the basis for the Caroline test for anticipatory self-defence in international relations.

=== Date unknown ===
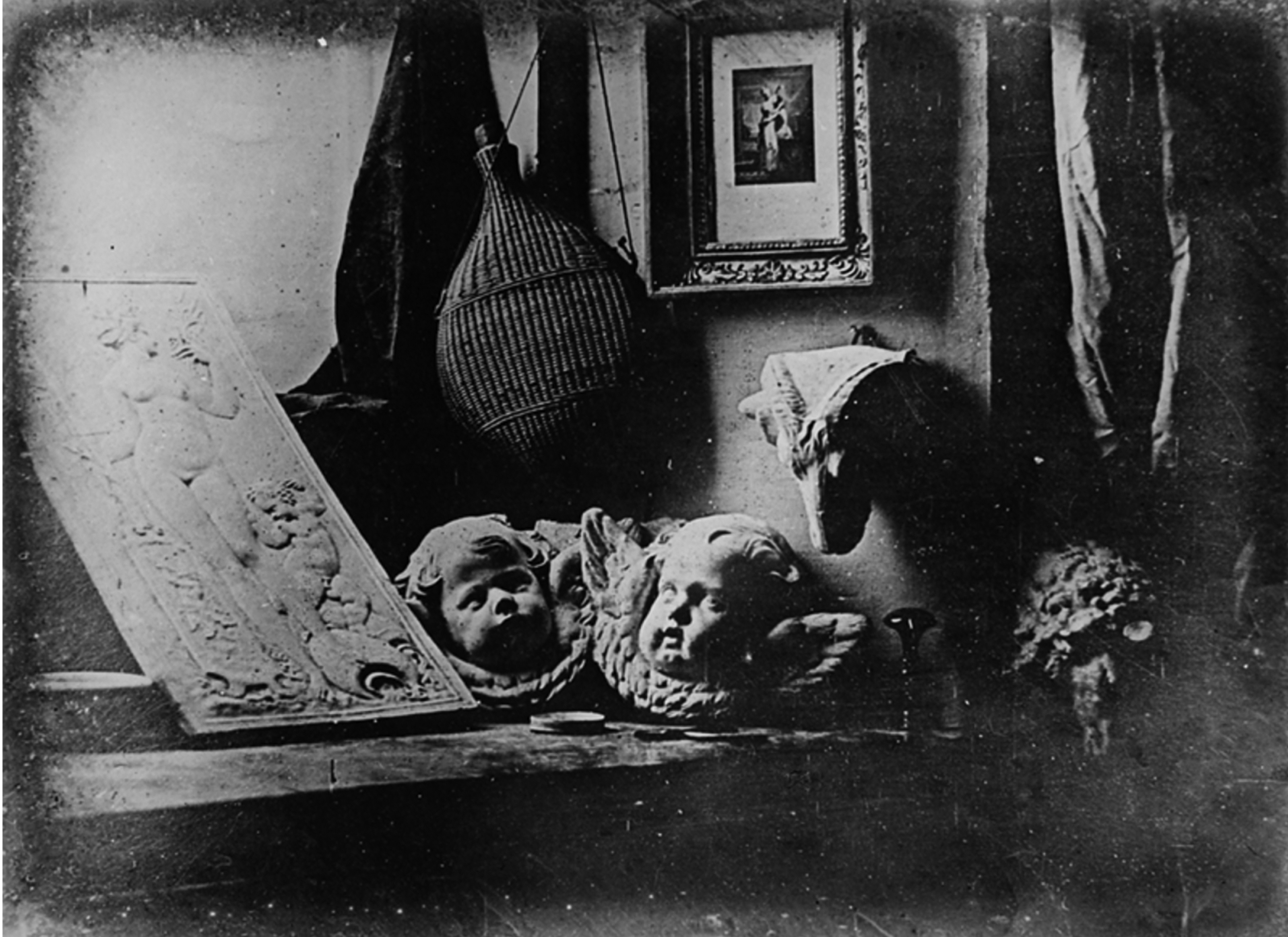
L’Atelier de l'artiste. An 1837 daguerreotype by Louis Daguerre.

- Louis Daguerre develops the daguerreotype.
- The 5th century B.C. Berlin Foundry Cup is acquired for the Antikensammlung Berlin in Germany.
- The Olney Friends School is founded in the Appalachian Mountains of the United States.
- The first electric locomotive built is a miniature battery locomotive constructed by chemist Robert Davidson of Aberdeen in Scotland, and powered by galvanic cells (batteries).
- Atlanta is fixed as the terminal of the Western and Atlantic Railroad; it is originally named Marthasville.

== Births ==
=== January–March ===
- January 2 – Mily Balakirev, Russian composer (d. 1910)
- January 7 – Thomas Henry Ismay, English shipowner (White Star Line) (d. 1899)
- February 5
  - Dwight L. Moody, American evangelist (d. 1899)
  - Edward Miner Gallaudet, American educator of the deaf (d. 1917)
- February 13 – Valentin Zubiaurre, Spanish composer (d. 1914)
- February 20 – Samuel Swett Green, American librarian, advocate (d. 1918)
- February 24 – Nakamuta Kuranosuke, Japanese admiral (d. 1916)
- March 1 – William Dean Howells, American writer, historian, editor, and politician (d. 1920)
- March 3 – Jacques Duchesne, French general (d. 1918)
- March 7 – Henry Draper, American physician and astronomer (d. 1882)
- March 18 – Grover Cleveland, 22nd and 24th President of the United States (d. 1908)
- March 22 – Virginia Oldoini, Countess of Castiglione (d. 1899)
- March 23 – Sir Charles Wyndham, English actor, theatrical manager (d. 1919)
- March 27 – Kate Fox, American medium (d. 1892)

=== April–June ===
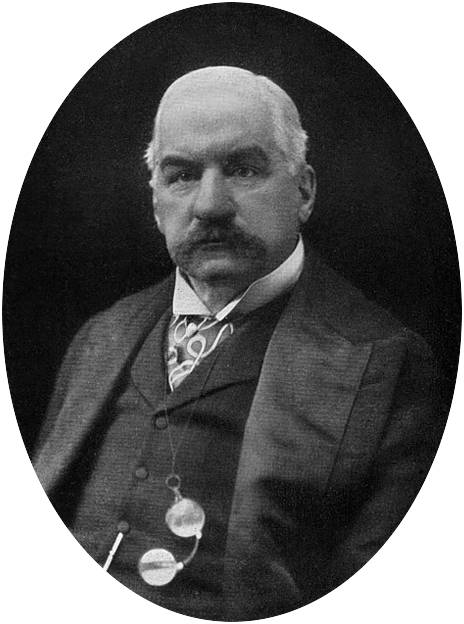
J. P. Morgan

- April 1 – Luis Francisco Benítez de Lugo y Benítez de Lugo (d. 1876)
- April 5 – Algernon Charles Swinburne, English poet (d. 1909)
- April 17 – J. P. Morgan, American financier, banker (d. 1913)
- April 21 – Fredrik Bajer, Danish politician, pacifist, recipient of the Nobel Peace Prize (d. 1922)
- April 27 – Queen Cheorin, Korean queen (d. 1878)
- April 29 – Georges Ernest Boulanger, French general, politician (d. 1891)
- May 5
  - Anna Maria Mozzoni, Italian feminist, founder of the Italian women's movement (d. 1920)
  - Theodor Rosetti, 16th Prime Minister of Romania (d. 1923)
- May 7 – Karl Mauch, German explorer (d. 1875)
- May 9
  - Adam Opel, German engineer, industrialist (d. 1895)
  - Ben Hall, Australian bushranger (d. 1865)
- May 27 – Wild Bill Hickok, American gunfighter (d. 1876)
- May 28
  - George Ashlin, Irish architect (d. 1921)
  - Tony Pastor, American impresario, theater owner (d. 1908)
- June 22
  - Paul Bachmann, German mathematician (d. 1920)
  - Paul Morphy, American chess player (d. 1884)
  - Touch the Clouds, Native American Miniconjou chief (d. 1905)
- June 28 – Petre P. Carp, 2-time prime minister of Romania (d. 1919)

=== July–September ===
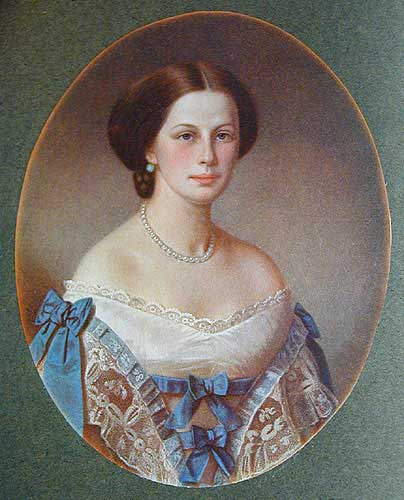
Anna Filosofova

- July 4 – Carolus-Duran, French painter (d. 1917)
- July 15 – Stephanie of Hohenzollern-Sigmaringen, Queen consort of Portugal (d. 1859)
- July 18 – Vasil Levski, Bulgarian revolutionary (d. 1873)
- July 21 – Johanna Hedén, Swedish midwife, surgeon (d. 1912)
- August 1 – (bapt.) Mary Harris Jones ("Mother Jones"), Irish-American labor leader (d. 1930)
- August 5 – Anna Filosofova, Russian women's rights activist (d. 1912)
- August 11 – John Ward, English palaeontologist (d. 1906)
- August 24 – Théodore Dubois, French composer (d. 1924)
- September 2 – James H. Wilson, Union Army major general in the American Civil War (d. 1925)
- September 12 – Louis IV, Grand Duke of Hesse (d. 1892)
- September 14 – Nikolai Bugaev, Russian mathematician (d.1903)
- September 16 – King Pedro V of Portugal (d. 1861)
- September 18 – Aires de Ornelas e Vasconcelos, Portuguese Archbishop of Goa (d. 1880)
- September 24 – Mark Hanna, United States Senator from Ohio (d. 1904)

=== October–December ===
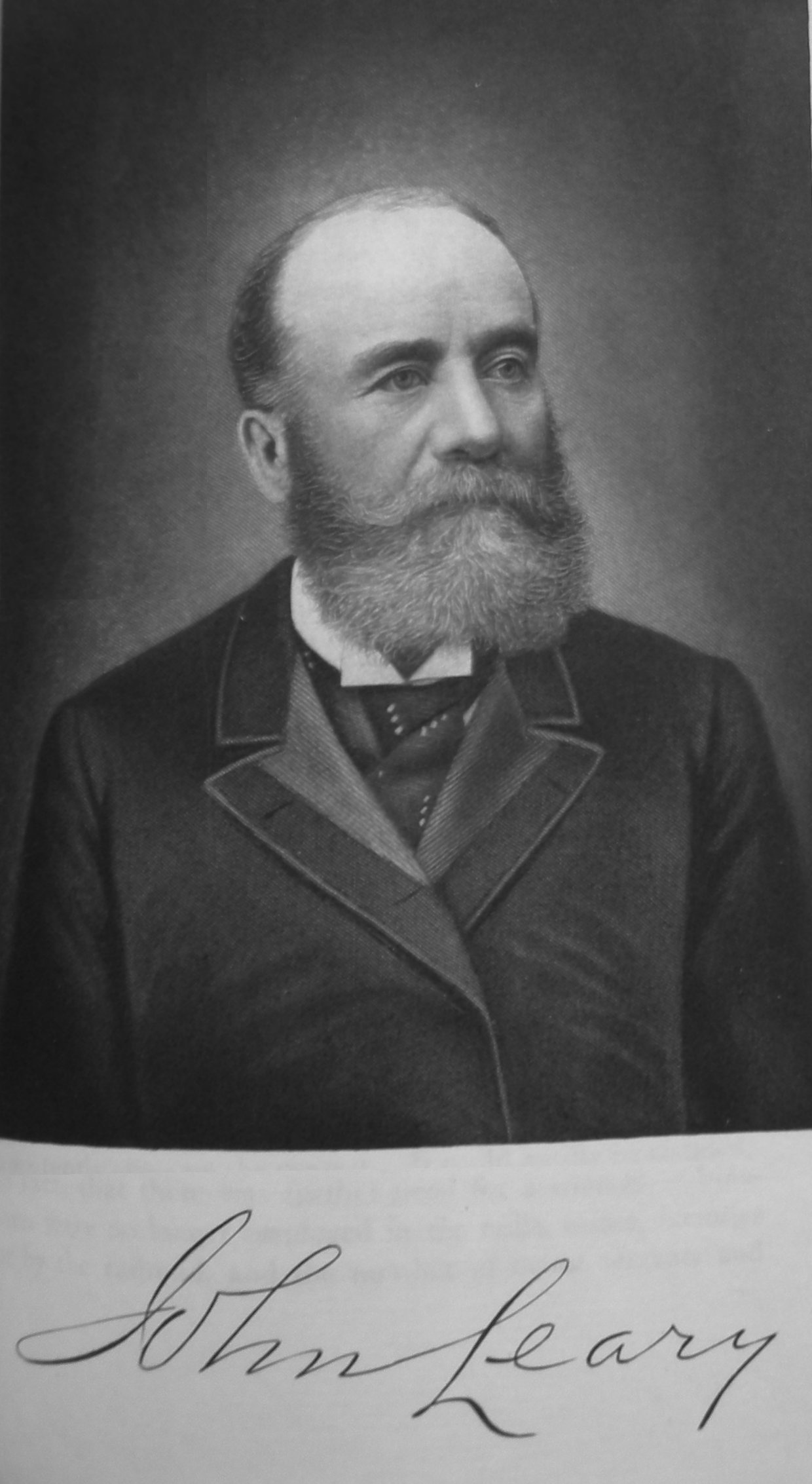
John Leary

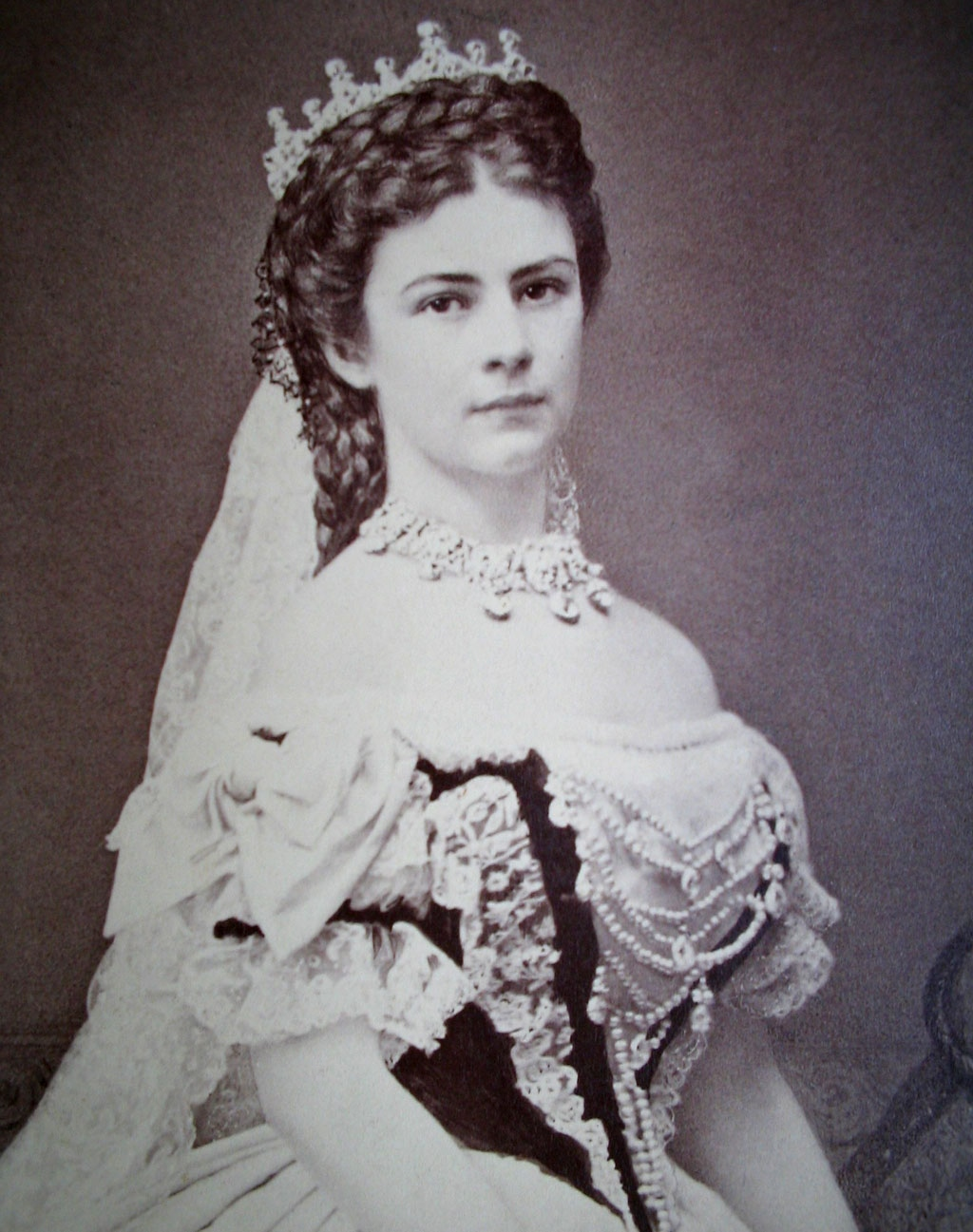
Empress Elisabeth of Austria

- October 3 – Nicolás Avellaneda, Argentine president (d. 1885)
- October 4 – Auguste-Réal Angers, Canadian judge and politician, 6th Lieutenant Governor of Quebec (d. 1919)
- October 5 – José Plácido Caamaño, 12th President of Ecuador (d. 1900)
- October 10 – Robert Gould Shaw, Union Army general in the American Civil War, social reformer (k. 1863)
- October 26 – Carl Koldewey, German explorer famous for the German North Polar Expedition (d. 1908)
- October 28 – Tokugawa Yoshinobu, Japanese shōgun, 15th and last of the Tokugawa shogunate (d. 1913)
- October 29 – Harriet Powers, African-American folk artist (d. 1910)
- November 1 – John Leary, American businessman, politician, and civic leader (d. 1905)
- November 2 – Émile Bayard, French artist, illustrator (d. 1891)
- November 5 – Arnold Janssen, German-born Catholic priest, saint (d. 1909)
- November 20 – Lewis Waterman, American inventor, businessman (d.1901)
- November 23 – Johannes Diderik van der Waals, Dutch physicist, Nobel Prize laureate (d. 1923)
- December (unknown date) – Bella French Swisher, American writer (d. 1893)
- December 9 – Kabayama Sukenori, Japanese samurai, general, and statesman (d. 1922)
- December 11 – Webster Paulson, English civil engineer (d. 1887)
- December 15 – George B. Post, American architect (d. 1913)
- December 24
  - Empress Elisabeth of Austria, wife of Emperor Franz Joseph I (d. 1898)
  - Cosima Wagner, wife of German composer Richard Wagner (d. 1930)
- December 26
  - Sir William Dawkins, British geologist (d. 1929)
  - George Dewey, American admiral (d. 1917)

== Deaths ==
=== January–June ===
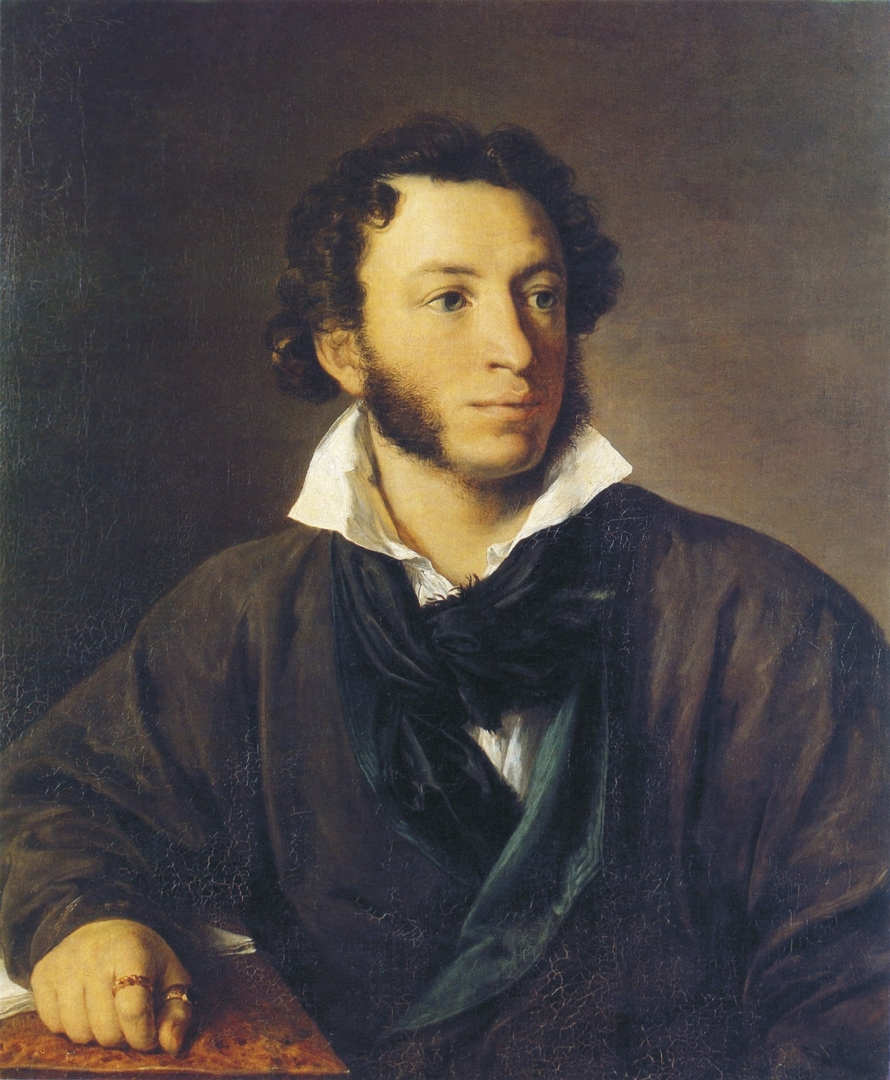
Alexander Pushkin

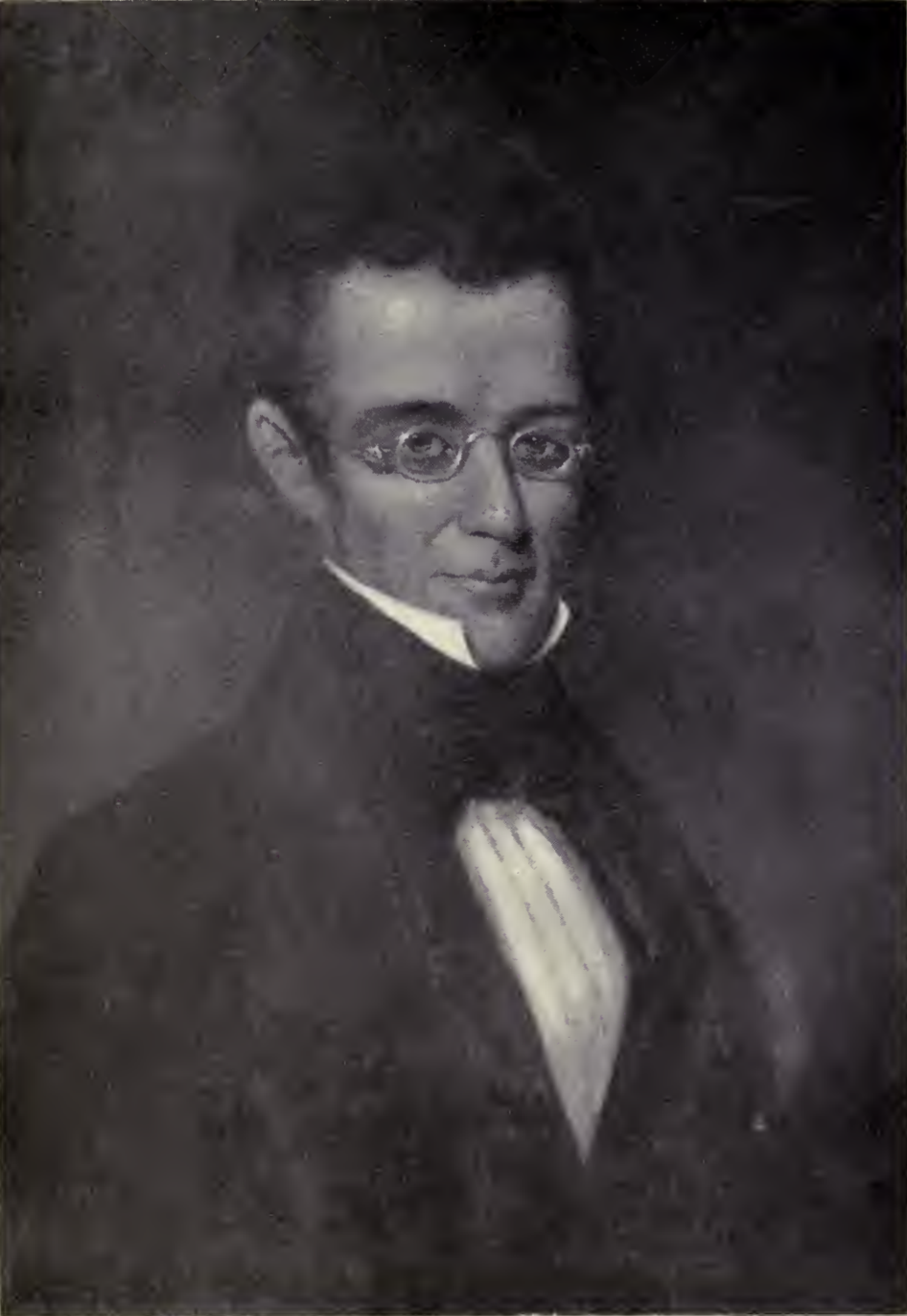
Osgood Johnson

- January 8 – Duke Wilhelm in Bavaria, great-grandfather of Empress Elisabeth of Austria (b. 1752)
- January 20 – John Soane, British architect (b. 1753)
- January 23 – John Field, Irish composer (b. 1782)
- February 7 – Gustav IV Adolf, deposed King of Sweden (b. 1778)
- February 10 – Alexander Pushkin, Russian author, wound received in duel (b. 1799)
- February 13 – Mariano José de Larra, Spanish author, suicide (b. 1809)
- February 19 – Georg Büchner, German playwright, typhus (b. 1813)
- February 23 – Friedrich Ludwig Weidig, German Protestant theologian, pastor and radical, suicide (b. 1791)
- March 31 – John Constable, English painter (b. 1776)
- April 4 – Louis-Sébastien Lenormand, French chemist, physicist and inventor (b. 1757)
- April 28 – Joseph Souham, French general (b. 1760)
- May 5 – Niccolò Antonio Zingarelli, Italian composer (b. 1752)
- May 20 – Prince Frederick of Hesse-Kassel (b. 1747)
- June 14 – Giacomo Leopardi, Italian writer (b. 1798)
- June 29 – Nathaniel Macon, American politician (b. 1757)
- June 20 – King William IV of the United Kingdom and Hannover (b. 1765)

=== July–December ===
- July 18 – Vincenzo Borg, Maltese merchant, rebel leader (b. 1777)
- August 12 – Pierre Laromiguière, French philosopher (b. 1756)
- September 7 – Fabian Gottlieb von Osten-Sacken, Russian military leader (b. 1752)
- September 21 – Pieter Vreede, Dutch politician (b. 1750)
- September 28 – Akbar II, last Mughal emperor of India (b. 1760)
- October 1 – Robert Clark, American politician (b. 1777)
- October 10 – Charles Fourier, French philosopher (b. 1772)
- October 12 – Charles-Marie Denys de Damrémont, French governor-general of French Algeria (killed during the siege of Constantine) (b. 1783)
- October 17
  - Johann Nepomuk Hummel, Austrian composer (b. 1778)
  - Peter Lebeck, French trapper and namesake of Lebec, California (birth unknown)
- November 7 – Elijah P. Lovejoy, American abolitionist (b. 1802)
- November 28 – Sophie Botta, the Dark Countess, German woman of mysterious identity

=== Date unknown ===
- Anne Pépin, Senegalese Signara (b. 1747)
- Mary Dixon Kies, first American recipient of a U.S. patent (b. 1752)
- Thomas Noble, English poet and translator (b. 1772)
- Sengai Gibon, Japanese monk
