= Douglas, Heron & Company =

Defunct Scottish bank

Douglas, Heron & Company Ayr Bank
- Founded: 1769
- Defunct: 1772
- Headquarters: Ayr, Scotland

Douglas, Heron & Company, also known as the Ayr Bank, was a Scottish bank with its head office at Ayr. It opened in November 1769 and folded in 1772 during the crisis of 1772.

== History ==
The nominal capital of the company was £150,000 or £160,000, of which £96,000 was immediately subscribed. However, no more than 80% of the capital was ever subscribed. There were 131 original partners, including Patrick Heron of Kirroughtree, the Earl of Dumfries, the Earl of March, and Sir Adam Fergusson of Kilkerran. Many of the partners were substantial landowners, such as the Duke of Buccleuch, the Duke of Queensberry, and Archibald Douglas, 1st Baron Douglas. The bank was established under a contract of co-partnery, so the partners were not protected by limited liability. This made the bank seem very secure, because its deposits were backed by the partners' land as collateral.

The bank granted many loans to favoured customers and soon had to issue bank notes to cover its position. By June 1772 the bank had issued £1.2 million through advances and bills of exchange, around two thirds of the currency of Scotland.

Douglas, Heron & Company relied for credit on the London bank Neal, James, Fordyce and Down, which collapsed in the crisis of 1772. Heavily in debt and unable to meet demands for cash on its banknotes, the bank was forced to close on 25 June 1772. The Dukes of Queensberry and Buccleuch, along with the Earl of Douglas and the Earl of Heron approached the Bank of England to try to secure loans on the security of their lands. The Bank of England offered £300,000, but the terms were considered extortionate. Subsequent approaches to the Bank of Scotland and the Royal Bank of Scotland, which had recently lent £22,000 and £10,000, respectively, were rejected. The bank managed to reopen for a brief period between September 1772 and August 1773, but a general meeting of the partners held on 12 August decided to dissolve the Company permanently.

== Legacy of collapse ==
In July 1776, the partners of the Ayr Bank met to form a committee to conduct an inquiry into the company's failure. Their report, Precipitation and Fall of Messrs Douglas, Heron and Company, Late Bankers in Air with the Causes of their Distress and Ruin, was completed in August 1777 and published in 1778. Key reasons for the Bank's collapse included excessive granting of credit, and a lack of central control. Each branch was effectively independent of head office and had its own board of directors. The report also cited gross misconduct: "open disregard, not only of the principles of the Copartnery, but of the express and positive rules and regulations laid down for the conduct of Managers".

In his History of Banking in Scotland, William Kerr says:

The essential errors of the Ayr Bank were trading beyond their means; divided control by permitting branches to act independently; forcing the circulation of their notes; giving credit too easily; ignorance of the principles of business; and carelessness or iniquity of officers.

The bank took twenty years to be wound up, starting in 1773 (some say it took 60 years). The partners' lands were sold to meet the bank's huge losses. The collapse of the bank was thus a major blow to the great Scottish landowning families. Those who could not cover their debts went to prison. Among the lairds partially or totally ruined were:

- Patrick Douglas of Cumnock
- Hugh Logan of Logan
- William Logan of Camlarg
- Robert Kennedy of Pinmore
- Archibald Craufurd of Ardmillan
- Sir John Whitefoord of Ballochmyle and Blairquhan
- John Christian of Kinning Park
- George McCrae of Pitcon
- David McLure of Shawood
- Mr. Cunningham of Dalfram
- John Carruthers, 12th Laird and 8th Baron Holmains

Adam Smith mentions the failed bank in The Wealth of Nations: "the design was generous, but the execution was imprudent, and the nature and causes of the distress which it meant to relieve were not, perhaps, well understood. This bank was far more liberal than any other had been, both in granting cash accounts, and in discounting bills of exchange" (II.ii.73). The Duke of Buccleuch was Smith's patron and former pupil.

The impacts also filtered to the common people and the disastrous results of the "spirit of overtrading" resulted in widespread poverty which in turn led to civil unrest such as the Tayside Meal Riots of 1772 and 1773.

== Records ==
Once the bank was wound up, its records were transferred to the British Linen Company. They were "still in the vaults" when John Buchanan compiled his list of Scottish banks in 1862, but were later lost.

== Bibliography ==
- Brady, Frank, So Fast to Ruin The Ayr Bank Crssh, Ayrshire Archaeological Society, 1973
- Goodspeed, Tyler Beck (2016). Legislating Instability: Adam Smith, Free Banking, and the Financial Crisis of 1722. Cambridge, Mass.: Harvard University Press. ISBN 9780674088887.
- Hamilton, Henry (1956). "The Failure of the Ayr Bank, 1772". Economic History Review. n.s. 8 (3): 405–417. JSTOR 2598492.
- Saville, Richard (1996). Bank of Scotland: A History, 1695–1995. Edinburgh: Edinburgh University Press. ISBN 0748607579.
- Sheridan, Richard B. (1960). "The British credit crisis of 1772 and the American colonies". Journal of Economic History. 20 (2): 161–186. doi:10.1017/s0022050700110411. JSTOR 2114853.
