= Tayside Meal Mobs =

Civil unrest in Dundee, Scotland, in 1772 and 1773

The Tayside Meal Mobs were episodes of civil unrest caused by the poverty of the people of Dundee and Perth, Scotland, in 1772 and 1773.

== Background ==
The riots were sparked from a series of events fuelled by the "spirit of overtrading" from the 1760s culminating in the collapse of Douglas, Heron & Company in 1772 and other small banks, whose activities led to the bankruptcy and/or ruin of multiple Scottish landlords which in turn led to widespread poverty amongst the population. The collapse of the Scottish linen industry from 1769 to 1772 chiefly affected Perthshire, Fife and Angus. A 30% drop in production caused a wave of unemployment and ensuing poverty.

The drop in price of linen, 25% reduced between 1769 and 1772, further compounded the problems.

== The Riots ==
Public riots began in the winter of 1772, with desperate workers blocking transport of grain out of the harbour and raiding warehouses in Dundee in order to feed their families. Riots also took place in Perth.

Further riots took place throughout Scotland, including Arbroath, Montrose and Glasgow through the 1770s.

== Consequences ==
Eleven people were prosecuted at the High Court in Edinburgh in March 1773, though only two, Malcolm Cameron and Peter Tosh appeared in court, with James Boswell among the advocates appearing for the defence. These defendants were acquitted. In a second trial, six individuals were charged with offences relating to the riot. Five men (including three weavers) fled Dundee into the countryside. One man, a sailor named Richard Robertson, connected to a ship in the harbour stayed to stand trial, again defended by Boswell. He was sentenced to transportation to Botany Bay for life, with the first seven years to be in hard labour.
