= Boston Non-importation agreement =

Boycott

The Boston Non-importation agreement was an 18th century boycott that restricted importation of goods to the city of Boston. This agreement was signed on August 1, 1768 by more than 60 merchants and traders. After two weeks, there were only 16 traders who did not join the effort. In the upcoming months and years, this non-importation initiative was adopted by other cities: New York joined the same year, Philadelphia followed a year later. Boston stayed the leader in forming an opposition to the mother country and its taxing policy. The boycott lasted until the 1770 when the British Parliament repealed the acts which the Boston Non-importation agreement was directed against.

== Historical context ==
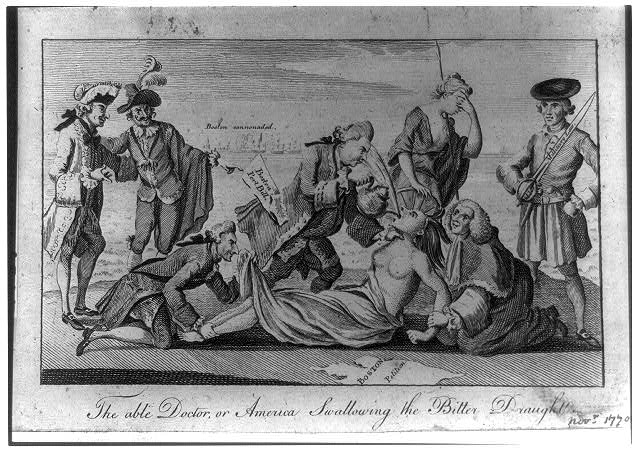
Cartoon shows Lord North, with the "Boston Port Bill" extending from a pocket, forcing tea down the throat of a partially draped Native female figure representing "America" whose arms are restrained by Lord Mansfield, while Lord Sandwich, a notorious womanizer, restrains her feet and peeks up her skirt. Britannia, standing behind "America", turns away and shields her face with her left hand.

The American colonies' boycott movement drew its inspiration from a similar campaign in Ireland, first popularized by the Irish satirist Jonathan Swift in 1720. As with Ireland, a British colony that had faced economic exploitation from Britain, the Irish Declaratory Act 1719 played a substantial role in shaping the British policies in North America. Ireland served as the blueprint for Great Britain's colonies, especially North America. Consequently, American revolutionaries imitated the Irish's rebellious spirit, which would have been unthinkable among the Anglo-Americans of that time.

Throughout the 1760s, the British Parliament passed numerous acts with severe implications on the colonial economy, negatively affecting industry, agriculture, and commerce. The first significant protest was against Parliament's Stamp Act 1765, which levied a varying tax on newspaper, commercial, and legal documents (as well as dice) used in the Thirteen Colonies. This took the form of stamped paper with various tax amounts embossed into the paper sent from Great Britain. There were no actual physical stamps affixed to the paper. The "stamps" were stamped paper. The aim of this act was to raise funds to offset the British crown's substantial debt accrued during the French and Indian War, and to provide funds for the stationing of troops in North America. Bostonians initially protested this taxation, imposing an embargo on British imports until the Stamp Act was repealed, with New York and Philadelphia following suit. The Stamp Act 1765 was repealed in March 1766 due to pressure from British exporters who were losing business. However, the British Parliament went on to pass several other unpopular acts:

- The Declaratory Act reinforced the Parliament's strong position regarding taxing the Thirteen Colonies.
- The Quartering Acts required colonies to provide housing and meal support to British troops stationed in colonial America, paid for by the colonies. This was particularly resented by the New York Assembly, which refused to fund troop support.

In June 1767, the Parliament passed the Townshend Revenue Act, which established new duties on goods such as lead, glass, paper, tea, and printers' colors. The revenues generated from these duties were intended to pay the salaries of colonial governors, judges, and troops. Unlike the Stamp Act, however, the Townshend Revenue Act failed to spark violent protest when it went into effect in November 1767. Protests were limited to economic boycotts, taking the form of non-importation agreements, and intellectual arguments.

In a series of essays known as the "Letters from a Farmer in Pennsylvania," John Dickinson argued that these taxes were unlawful because the Parliament lacked the authority to levy taxes on the colonists. Initially published in the Pennsylvania Chronicle, the essays were later circulated in newspapers across the colonies. Alongside Thomas Paine's Common Sense, these letters are regarded as the most influential pamphlets of the Revolutionary era. They underscored the threat to colonial independence, framed recent acts as attacks on colonial liberties, and stressed the necessity for colonial protest.

Galvanized by Dickinson's letters, James Otis Jr. urged the Massachusetts House of Representatives to petition the British king. This resulted in the Massachusetts Circular Letter, penned by Otis and Samuel Adams, advocating collective action against the British Parliament and the Townshend Act. This sparked a debate on the Parliament's right to impose taxes solely for revenue-raising purposes. The colonies argued, with Dickinson's backing, that they could not be taxed without elected representation ("no taxation without representation"). The Parliament, on the other hand, insisted it was their duty to protect their citizens and subjects. The colonies' attempts to contest this British policy resulted in the dissolution of the New York and Massachusetts assemblies.

When the British government failed to acknowledge the reason for colonial objections, a conflict between the mother country and the colony became inevitable. The Parliament perceived these complaints as clear attempts to undermine its authority, Navigation Acts, mercantile system, and the entire empire. Arguably, the only peaceful means left for the American colonies to assert their demands was through boycotting British goods. This intention culminated in an initiative by Boston merchants and traders, leading to the Boston Non-importation Agreement.

== The agreement ==
The main purpose of the Boston Non-importation agreement was to protest the Townshend Revenue Act and boycott the majority of British goods. It was signed by Boston merchants and traders on August 1, 1768, and was effective from January 1, the very next year.

As such, it is a brief and relatively straightforward business statement. Nevertheless, the authors did not avoid describing the economic situation and enumerating reasons which had led to the signing of the agreement. The merchants consider the taxes burdensome, frustrating and restrictive for the colonial trade. Moreover, some, led by John Dickinson, argued that the taxes were a violation of their rights. They also expressed a dilemma whether such taxes could be a potential threat to American liberty. Besides thoughts and doubts, the document also contained statements about the trade which the signed merchants agreed upon.

- They would not import any other goods than they already had imported or ordered that fall.
- They would not import any kind of goods from the next year's January. However, they decided to exclude some of the critical supplies, such as salt, coals, fish hooks and lines.
- They strongly refused to import any of the goods, overtaxed by the Townshend Act, mainly tea, glass and paper.
- They would suspend this agreement only if the taxes were removed.

This agreement was aimed at the British Parliament, directly. Nonetheless, the Parliament was not the only one which formed a target of the agreement. Boston businessmen, rather, hoped that their English counterparts would create a pressure on the Parliament so as to avoid a damage, or even worse, a collapse, of the colonial trade which would consequently influence British economy and welfare.

As well as Englishmen, American colonists were an audience for the Boston agreement, too. On one hand, there were traders, merchants, craftsmen and shopkeepers who would enjoy the economic benefits of a successful boycott. On the other hand, in political spheres, it could serve as an example of triumphant opposition to the British. To achieve such a victory, it was crucial that the boycott had been joined by as many traders and merchants as possible, not only in Boston but throughout all the colonies of the New World.

== Full text of the Boston Non-importation agreement ==
The merchants and traders in the town of Boston having taken into consideration the deplorable situation of the trade, and the many difficulties it at present labours under on account of the scarcity of money, which is daily increasing for want of the other remittances to discharge our debts in Great Britain, and the large sums collected by the officers of the customs for duties on goods imported; the heavy taxes levied to discharge the debts contracted by the government in the late war; the embarrassments and restrictions laid on trade by several late acts of parliament; together with the bad success of our cod fishery, by which our principal sources of remittance are like to be greatly diminished, and we thereby rendered unable to pay the debts we owe the merchants in Great Britain and to continue the importation of goods from thence; We, the subscribers, in order to relieve the trade under those discouragements, to promote industry, frugality, and economy, and to dis- courage luxury, and every kind of extravagance, do promise and engage to and with each other as follows:

- First, that we will not send for or import from Great Britain, either upon our own account or upon a commission, this fall, any other goods than what are already ordered for the fall supply.
- Secondly, that we will not send for or import any kind of goods or merchandise from Great Britain, either on our own account, or on commissions, or any otherwise, from the 1st of January 1769, to the 1st of January 1770, except salt, coals, fish hooks and lines, hemp, and duck bar lead and shot, wool- cards and card wire.
- Thirdly, that we will not purchase any factor, or others, any kind of goods imported from Great Britain, from January 1769 to January 1770.
- Fourthly, that we will not import, on our own account, or on commissions or purchase of any who shall import from any other colony in America, from January 1769 to January 1770, any tea, glass, paper, or other goods commonly imported from Great Britain.
- Fifthly, that we will not, from and after the 1st of January 1769, import into this province any tea, paper, glass, or painters colours, until the act imposing duties on those articles shall be repealed.

In witness whereof, we have hereunto set our hands, this first day of August 1768.

— Boston Non-importation agreement, Milestone Documents in American History : Exploring the Primary Sources That Shaped America

== Contribution of the Daughters of Liberty ==
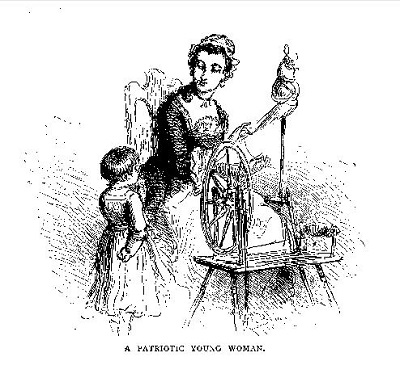
A Patriotic Young Woman

Even though the participation of Sons of Liberty is undeniable to the matters of non-importation agreements, they were not the only ones who opposed British rule. During the period of time without British luxury products, tea or textile, there appeared to be an opportunity for patriotic women to play a role in public affairs. Even though they did not join the public protest they formed a strong group called Daughters of Liberty. Instead, they helped to manufacture goods when the non-importation agreements came into effect and caused deficits of British goods, especially textiles. They were spinning wool into yarn, knitting yarn into cloth. They also decided to join the initiative of boycotting English tea, and instead of it, used different herbs and plants like mint or raspberry. Many times, these women run either a household or even a small shop. So they could make a choice of which goods to buy and which to boycott. Consequently, they had a huge impact on the non-importations and its effectiveness.

== Impact of the agreement ==
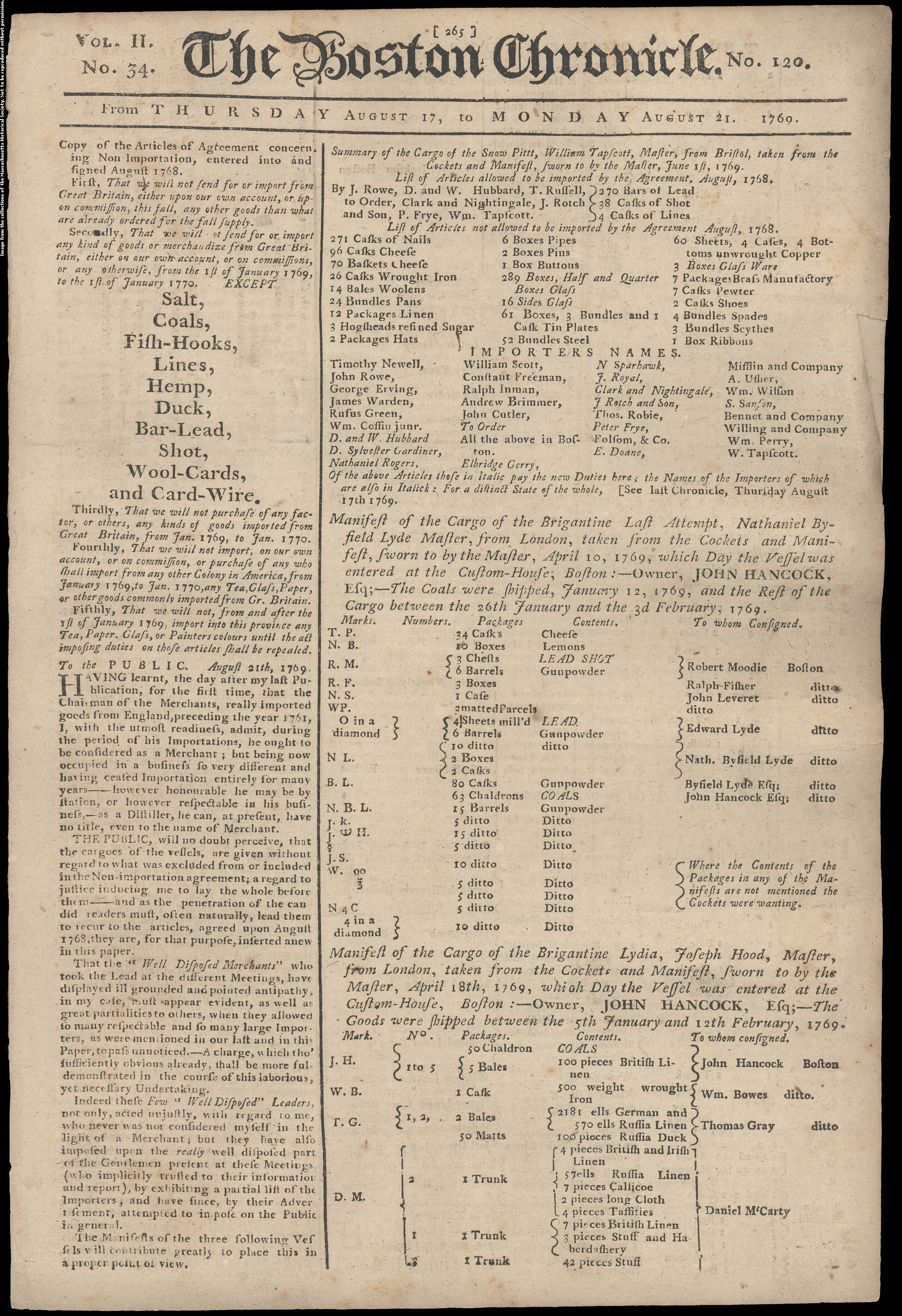
The Boston Chronicle page which contains the Boston Non-importation agreement of 1768. It also contains lists of importers who broke the agreement.

As a reaction to the boycott, the British Parliament expressed an anger and frustration that the colonists denied British authority in taxing matters which was in direct contrast with the Declaratory Act, legislated by the Parliament on the ashes of the annulled Stamp Act.

The Boston merchants and traders reduced their imports of British goods by almost a half. Unfortunately, the other port cities and colonies themselves failed to adopt the non-importation policy of Boston merchants what consequently undermined the effort of their boycott. This failure in cooperation meant that the trade between England and the colonies remained sufficient. British merchants had sensed no threat in this weak effort and did not lobby for dropping the Townshend Act.

It was not very far in history when an embargo against the Stamp Act, a very similar one to the Boston boycott was a success. The real threat of trade interruption made the English traders press on the Parliament and repeal the Stamp Act. Boston merchants might have hoped that such tactics would work out also this time. Main reasons why the Boston boycott was not a success as they had probably expected were two.

- First, as stated before, during the Boston boycott, the decrease in trade was not as significant as before.
- Second, the British merchant community felt offended by colonial merchants because they believed that the colonists had not expressed enough gratitude for British merchants' role in the repeal of the Stamp Act.

All in all, the Boston Non-importation agreement cannot be considered a huge success. Firstly, not many colonies had signed up to this boycott. For example, southern colonies refused to take any part in this initiative. Secondly, self-interests, smuggling and breaches of the agreement by many merchants and traders also from Boston undermined the initiative even more.

One of such cheating importers was John Hancock, who was a merchant, statesman, and a patriot of the American Revolution. He had his captains' transport goods which were prohibited by the agreement. His ships carried cargo such as British linen or gunpowder. Another known smuggler was Samuel Adams, also a well known American statesman, who later became one of the organizers of Boston Tea Party. These smuggling practices were not only an effective means of resisting high taxes of Britain and weakening its policies but also a cheaper alternative for desired goods. The illegal goods were obtained, in particular, from the Dutch, French and Spanish traders and merchants.

By a change in Great Britain ministry's foreign policy, which wanted a promotion of trade, export and manufacturing, the Townshend Act was repeal, only partially, though. Subsequently, the colonists partially repealed their own non-importation policies. The duties imposed on many goods were lowered, except for tea. The Parliament also maintained its right to tax the colonies. The fact that the Townshend duty stayed in effect for tea, in addition to the Tea Act, which objected to reducing amounts of tea stored in London warehouses, resulted in the later so-called Boston Tea Party.

== Economical impact ==
In the beginning, let's draw a table, displaying an average import of linens and cotton to Philadelphia.

Year	Per cent
1747-1749	39
1750-1753	29
1754-1757	27
1750-1753	29
1758-1759	33
1760-1762	16
1763-1765	13
1766-1768	28
1769-1770	42
1771-1773	16

These figures show how the state of affairs affected the trade. A great depression can be seen in the years of the 1760s when the majority of non-importation and taxes battle struggled. Nonetheless, it is suggested that the non-importation and connected depression was not caused only by the unpopular acts. In this period of time, the creditors and investors asked for their money back from the colonial importers who were unable to pay their debts. To gather more money they made up the nonimportation so that they could sell their stock at the higher prices.

You will have a good price for all your dead goods which have always been unprofitable. You will collect your debts and bring your debts in England to a close, so that balances would hereby be brought about in your favour, which without some such method must forever be against you.

— anonymous, Pennsylvania Gazette (Philadelphia), November 17, 1767

Not only had the non-importation agreements helped to repeal unwanted acts, but they also supported bring down in the exchange rates and clear the stuffed inventories of the importers.

I believe the gentlemen in trade are one and all convinced that it will be to no good purpose for them to import English goods as usual. They despair of ever selling them, and consequently of ever being able to pay for them.

— Thomas Cushing, To Denys DeBerdt, March 4, 1768, Founding of a Nation

== Conclusion ==
All the struggle over the 1760s can be seen as a tough commitment of the Colonials for economic and political independence, an attempt to remove, what they considered, illegal taxes and duties. One of such attempts was the Boston Non-importation agreement which, even though, not an enormous success, also contributed to this struggle which would later result in more escalated conflicts and later in the American Revolution itself. One can also conclude that non-importations were also a means to clean the inventories, reset the economics and balance the exchange rates.
