= Neale, James, Fordyce and Downe =

British banking house

Neale, James, Fordyce and Down was a London banking house, established in 1757 by Henry Neale (1713 - 1773), William James, Alexander Fordyce and Richard Down (1734 - 1814). Its collapse in June 1772 precipitated a major banking crisis which included the collapse of almost every private bank in Scotland, and a liquidity crisis in the two major banking centres of the world, London and Amsterdam. The bank had been speculating by shorting East India Company stock on a massive scale, and apparently using customer deposits to cover losses.

The leading figure in the speculation was agreed to be the partner Alexander Fordyce. He was Scottish, brother of James Fordyce, the distinguished clergyman and author of Sermons to Young Women, and was married to a daughter of the Earl of Balcarres. On June 9 1772, the day before he fled to France, he was reported to have come home in wild spirits, saying that he had "always told the wary ones, ‘and the wise ones, with heads of a chicken and claws of a corbie, that I would be a man or a mouse; and this night this very night the die is cast, and I am . . . am . . . A man! Bring Champaign; and Butler, Burgundy below! let tonight live for ever! . . . Alexander is a man.’"

The next day his bank had to close, and two days later, three other London banking firms with Scottish connections collapsed, and in the twelve days after Fordyce fled, 22 significant banks, notably the Scottish Douglas, Heron & Co known as the Ayr Bank, and many smaller ones all stopped payments, never to resume. In London the Bank of England was able to stabilize the situation, but attempts in London to save the situation in Scotland failed. There were one-day runs on Drummonds Bank and Coutts, which they were able to cover and survive. The Scottish banks, especially those in Edinburgh rather than Glasgow, had mostly been borrowing from the Ayr Bank, partly to finance the building of the New Town, Edinburgh. Others hit by the collapse included the Scottish architect John Adam and his younger brothers Robert and James Adam, who were in the middle of their ambitious Adelphi, London scheme, and had to lay off two thousand workmen for a week.

The liquidity crisis spread to the next most important banking centre in Europe, Amsterdam, where Clifford and Sons went bankrupt, and the Amsterdam market was only steadied by the formation of a "cooperative fund" among the other banking houses of the city. The liquidity situation continued to be a problem into 1773.

The crisis has also been seen as worsening relations between Britain and the Thirteen Colonies in America. Among other stresses, the East India Company, already in financial difficulties, was further weakened by the crisis, and in 1773 managed to persuade Parliament to pass the Tea Act, exempting it from the duty all other importers in the colonies had to pay. The unpopularity of this led to the Boston Tea Party at the end of the year.

According to a sermon of 1775, Alexander Fordyce:

had a mind not ill-formed for commerce, and from his early success in it was enabled, though of an obscure original, to live respectably. If his views had extended no farther, it would have been well, but his ambition was unbounded. the revenue of a kingdom would hardly have sufficed to have executed his schemes. He seemed bent on engrossing the trade of the whole world. Large sums were borrowed of one and of another. His friends advanced liberally, and so high was his reputation, that they had no doubt of their effects being secure. But the event proved that they were wretchedly deceived. His affairs were embarrassed, his difficulties increased, and at length grew inextricable; a total stoppage ensued; the issue of a commission of bankruptcy, by some chicanery, was prevented; and but a small part of his enormous debts hath been paid to this very hour. I shall not pretend to enumerate the many families which by his means sunk into distress. His fall was like the fall of a towering structure which overwhelms numbers with its ruins. It deserves, however, particular mention, that the news of his failure despatched one brother to the regions of the dead, and, which is yet more lamentable, drove another into a state of insanity.
