= Thomas Noble (poet) =

English poet (1772–1837)

Thomas Noble (1772–1837) was an English poet.

== Works ==
- The Dawn of Peace, an Ode, with other pieces ([London]: Ginger, 1801);
- Zelomer, a romance, translated from the French (12mo., 1801)
- Blackheath; a Poem in Five Cantos. Lumena; or the Ancient British Battle: and Various Other Poems; Including a Translation of the First Book of the Argonautica of C. Valerius Flaccus, and other poems (4to., London: J. B. Courthope, Richardsons, Harris, and Chapple, 1808);
- The Persian Hunters, or, The Rose of Gurgistan: an opera (London: Sherwood, Neely, and Jones, 1817);
- Poems (Liverpool/London: printed for the author by Smith and Melling/Carpenter and Son, 1821);
- Julia, or Pre-existent Spirits, in Quaternion Rhymes: The Meditative Minstrel, in Blank Verse... (Derby/London: W. and W. Pike/Charles Tilt, [1828]).

=== Translation of the Latin Argonautica ===
Henry George Blomfield praised Noble's verse translation of the Argonautica of Valerius Flaccus in the preface to his own prose translation:

I must record my deep and lasting sense of gratitude to the work of a most undeservedly forgotten poet, Thomas Noble, the author, already referred to, of the only existing translation in any language of any part of Valerius Flaccus. Noble only translated one book, in verse, but he was a poet himself, and he has caught the spirit and fire of his author, and has given us a delightful, and at the same time a most faithful, version of Valerius. He seldom shirks a difficulty, as verse translators are in the habit of doing; and a word or a phrase in Noble's translation, or more often his rendering of a whole passage, has in many cases led me to the true significance of the lines I was dealing with. His version will repay careful attention as an English poem, and should be read for its own sake even by those who have not the inclination, the leisure, or the ability to peruse the original. Certainly no student, at any rate no English-speaking or English-knowing student, of the Argonautica can afford to neglect Noble's contribution to the study of that poem. I think there is no one who has read the translation of the first book side by side with the original but must feel a deep sense of regret that such a fine scholar and poet, and one withal who understood his author so well, should have been cut off thus in the ripeness of manhood, his life's work and magnum opus (for so, I think, we are justified in regarding it) still imperfect and unaccomplished.

It is prefaced by a discursive introduction, and some notes, mainly mythological, are appended to the translation. The author contemplated a metrical version of the remaining seven books, and even proposed to take the story down to the end of the voyage, and so bring to a conclusion what Valerius himself had left unfinished; but he never lived to complete even the extant portion of the poem, much less fulfil the further task which he had set himself.

== Namesake ==
A contemporary Thomas Noble wrote A complete Book of Practical Perspective, exemplified in landscape (4to., 1805).

== Sources ==
- Blomfield, H. G. (1916). The Argonautica of Gaius Valerius Flaccus Setinus Balbus: Book I. Oxford: B. H. Blackwell. pp. 11–12.
- Upcott, William (1816). A Biographical Dictionary of the Living Authors of Great Britain and Ireland. London: printed for Henry Colburn by A. J. Valpy. p. 253.
- "Noble, Thomas". Jackson Bibliography of Romantic Poetry. University of Toronto. Retrieved 8 November 2022.
