= 1917 Islington East by-election =

UK parliamentary by-election

The 1917 Islington East by-election was a parliamentary by-election for the British House of Commons constituency of Islington East held on 23 October 1917.

== Vacancy ==
The by-election was caused by the death of the sitting Liberal MP, Sir George Radford at the age of 66. Radford had won the seat at the 1906 general election and held it since then but Islington East was not a safe Liberal seat. It was created in 1885 and won for the Liberals in that year's general election by Henry Bret Ince. But Ince lost to the Conservatives in 1886 and the Tories held it until Radford's victory in 1906. However, during the First World War there was an electoral truce between the main political parties by which it was agreed that all by-election vacancies would be filled unopposed. The Liberal Party could therefore expect their chosen candidate to face no Conservative or Labour opponent.

== Candidates ==
=== Liberals ===
Three names were put to the Islington East Liberals for consideration as candidate; Sir J Benn who was leader of the Progressives on the London County Council and a former Liberal MP, D S Waterlow, who was Liberal MP for Islington North from 1906-December 1910 and Edward Smallwood a coal manufacturer who represented the area on the London County Council and who was the successful applicant.

=== Conservatives ===
The local Conservatives voted to honour to electoral truce and support Smallwood, albeit reluctantly as in normal times they would have hopes of re-capturing the seat, as long as he pledged to fight the election as a supporter of the prime minister and government in all measures necessary for the victorious prosecution of the war. Smallwood gave this pledge and the Tories, including two former candidates for the seat, campaigned for his return.

=== Labour ===
Neither the Labour Party, nor indeed any candidate representing organised labour, had contested Islington East since its creation in 1885 and no Labour candidate was nominated.

=== Others ===
However Smallwood was to face a contested election as two other candidates came forward. The newly formed National Party announced it would nominate E B Barnard, the former Liberal MP for Kidderminster. At the time of the by-election Barnard was the Chairman of the Metropolitan Water Board. The National Party announced their intention to campaign in the election against the government practice of ‘peerage-mongering’ and ‘seat-selling’ and urged electors to join their crusade against the scandal of the sale of honours.

The other candidate nominated was Alfred Baker, the Town Clerk and former Mayor of Hertford who stood as an Independent but was backed by the organisation known as the ‘Vigilantes’ led by the extreme right-winger Noel Pemberton Billing, who was MP for Hertford. Two other possible ‘patriotic’ candidates, Allen Clark and Robert Forsyth decided not to seek nomination once they knew that a ‘Vigilante’ was in the field and supported Baker's campaign.

== Zeppelin attack ==
A noteworthy feature of the by-election was a raid on the area by a German airship on the Friday before polling day. A number of Zeppelins dropped bombs on England killing 27 and injuring 53. The ships then seem to have got lost in the fog and drifted over France where eight of the eleven airships were reported to have been brought down or so disabled they were forced to land. The news that it had been left to French airmen to destroy the fleet which had attacked London caused resentment in England and was said to have given a considerable impetus to Baker's campaign. It was reported on the day before polling that questions relating to air operations, both defensive and offensive, were now dominating the East Islington contest.

== Result ==
The result was a hold for the government party with Smallwood taking 57% of the poll. The election was held using the old register of electors and many voters were absent from the area. As a result, the turnout was only 36.9% as compared with 79.9% at the previous general election in December 1910. The result was entirely satisfactory from the point of view of the government and showed it retained the confidence of the electorate to prosecute the war effectively and remained representative of people's patriotic emotions during the war. But Baker's showing, with 32.2% of the poll, put heart into the ‘Vigilante’ camp. The National Party was not deterred by Barnard's 10.8% of the poll. They quickly re-stated their aim to be the ‘patriotic’ party of the nation and to cooperate with Labour, as the party of the future, best able to promote reform, union and defence – the National Party watchwords.

Edward Smallwood

Islington East by-election, 1917:
Party	Candidate	Votes	%	±%
Liberal	Edward Smallwood	2,709	57.0	+6.3
Independent	Alfred Baker	1,532	32.2	New
National	Edmund Broughton Barnard	513	10.8	New
Majority		1,177	24.8	+23.4
Turnout		4,754	36.9	−43.0
Liberal hold		Swing		

== See also ==
- 1931 Islington East by-election
- List of United Kingdom by-elections
- United Kingdom by-election records
