= Stationers' Company's School =

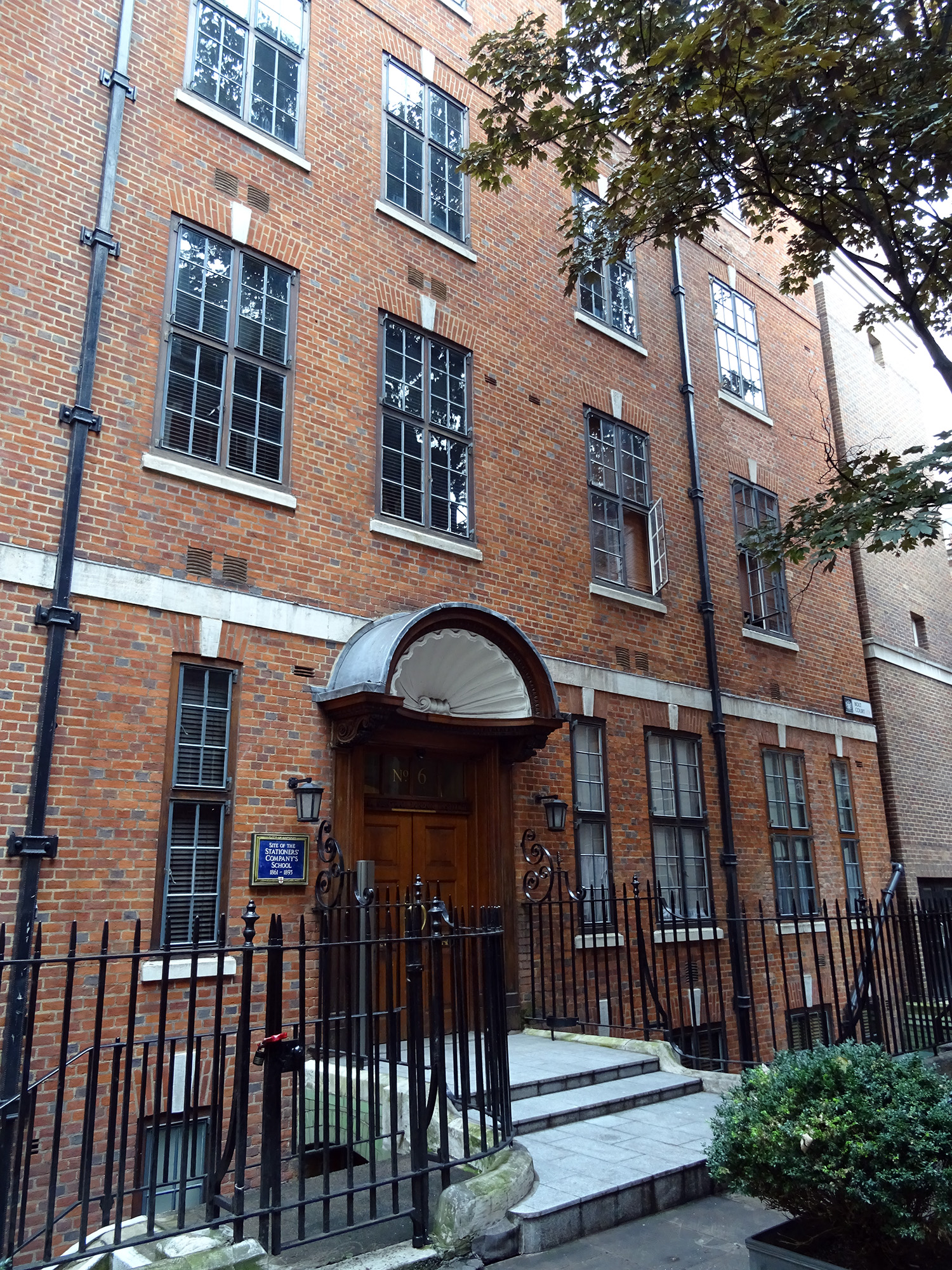

Location
- Mayfield Road; Hornsey Vale, Middlesex, N8 9LR; England; 51°34′51″N 0°06′51″W

Information
- Type: Grammar school then Voluntary Controlled Comprehensive from 1967
- Motto: verbum Domini manet in aeternum
- Established: 1861
- Founder: Worshipful Company of Stationers and Newspaper Makers
- Closed: 1983
- Local authority: Haringey
- Gender: Boys
- Age: 11 to 18
- Enrollment: 1100 as comprehensive
- Fate: Closed in 1983

The Stationers' Company's School was a grammar school for boys, later a comprehensive school in Hornsey, north London.

== Foundation ==
The school was founded by the Worshipful Company of Stationers and Newspaper Makers to provide education for sons of those in the printing, newspaper, publishing and allied trades, at that time concentrated around Fleet Street, Ludgate Hill and Paternoster Square. In 1861 it was established at No.6 Bolt Court, a historic alleyway off Fleet Street. The Master of the school from 1858 to 1882 was Alexander Kennedy Isbister.

=== Grammar school ===
In 1891 the School moved to a spacious hill-top site between Mayfield Road and Denton Road in Hornsey, northeast from Crouch End in purpose-built buildings in a Gothic Style. Early on the speech night was held at the nearby Stationers' Hall and after relocation to Hornsey often at the Hornsey Town Hall. In 1933 the school was extended and a new assembly hall, gymnasium, dining hall and workshops were accommodated in a new brick extension rising to five storeys along Mayfield Road, which doubled the school's footprint.

Founded as a voluntary aided school, it became voluntary controlled in 1966 within the newly created London Borough of Haringey, after which the Stationers' Company's connection with the school through the appointment of governors was largely nominal.

=== Comprehensive ===
Stationers' Company's Grammar School became a comprehensive boys' school in 1967, by merger with Priory Vale Secondary Modern School in Hornsey .The combined school closed in 1983. The buildings were demolished and part of the site landscaped as Stationers' Park, with the balance developed as social housing.

== Alumni ==
- Captain William (Bill) Steele, SOE instructor and operational in Burma 1945, mentioned in dispatches.
- David Pascoe Aiers British diplomat
- Anthony Beattie, Chief Executive from 1990-6 of the Natural Resources Institute, Chatham
- Gerald Bonner, Early Church historian and scholar of religion, Durham University and Catholic University of America.
- Prof Alexander Boksenberg CBE, Director from 1993-6 of the Royal Observatories, and Professor of Physics and Astronomy from 1978–81 at University College London
- Colin Chapman CBE, engineer and inventor who founded Lotus Cars
- Benjamin Dale, composer
- Meredith Davies CBE, conductor and Organist from 1949-56 of Hereford Cathedral
- Frank Dickens, cartoonist, drawing Bristow for the Evening Standard
- Franklin Engelmann, radio broadcaster who hosted Down Your Way from 1955–72
- John Grant, Labour MP from 1970-4 for Islington East, and from 1974-83 for Islington Central (SDP from 1981)
- Eric Hosking OBE, ornithologist and photographer
- Stephen Jeffreys, playwright and screenwriter with an enduring relationship with the Royal Court Theatre
- Philip Mairet, designer, writer and educator
- Richard Muir CMG, Ambassador to Kuwait from 1999–2002, and to Oman from 1994-9
- Stanford Robinson OBE, conductor
- Barry Took (initially), comedy writer and TV presenter
- David Triesman, Baron Triesman, Chairman from 2008-10 of The Football Association, General Secretary from 1993-2001 of the Association of University Teachers (AUT), and General Secretary of the Labour Party from 2001-3
- Major Wilfrid Vernon, aircraft designer and Labour MP from 1945-51 for Dulwich
- Stephen Platten, Bishop of Wakefield since 2003
- David Motton, Script writer for comics Eagle, Dandy, Wizard, Hotspur, Tell Me Why etc. including Dan Dare, Desperate Dan, Jet Ace Logan
- M. Saiful Islam, Chemistry Professor at University of Bath and 2016 Royal Institution Christmas Lecturer.
- Dotun Adebayo, BBC radio presenter, writer, and publisher.
- Chris Kane, musician with ska revival band Bad Manners
- Francis Evans (teacher)

== See also ==
- Worshipful Company of Stationers and Newspaper Makers
