= Emma, Lady Radford =

Emma Louisa (Radford), Lady Radford, FSA, FRHistS, JP (died 26 April 1937) was an English antiquarian and public servant. A noted local historian and a contributor to the Dictionary of National Biography, she was the first woman to be elected President of the Devonshire Association for the Advancement of Science, Literature and the Arts, and was also among the first women to be appointed a magistrate for the Exeter Bench.

== Early life and family ==
Emma Louisa Radford was the daughter of Daniel Radford (1828–1900), who hailed from a family which had lived at Oakford, Devon, for generations, before Daniel's father settled at Plymouth; Daniel went to London in 1849 and operated as a successful coal merchant, pioneering the Welsh coal trade in the capital. He returned to Devon in later life, first to Lydford, and then to Mount Tavy near Tavistock in 1886, a house he bought and enlarged before retiring there, enabling him to enjoy public service as a magistrate and as Tavistock's first representative on Devon County Council. He was also an active member of the Devonshire Association for the Advancement of Science, Literature and the Arts and contributed two papers to the society's journal. Three of Emma Radford's brothers were Fellows of the Society of Antiquaries, as was her nephew, the archaeologist and academic C. A. Ralegh Radford.

Having been schooled near Paris, Radford was a fluent French speaker and enjoyed holidays in Europe. In 1882, she married her first cousin, George Heynes Radford (1851–1917), the son of George David Radford, of Plymouth. The younger George was a solicitor who later served as a London County Councillor (1895–1907) and Liberal Member of Parliament for East Islington (1906–17), for which service he was knighted in 1916. Together, they had a son and three daughters:

- George Laurence Radford (1888–1918).
- Katherine Kentisbeare Radford (died 1949), who married Gerald Hume Saverie Pinsent in 1915.
- Cecily Radford (died 1967), an amateur archaeologist, a long-serving member of the Devonshire Association (contributing to its Transactions five times and serving on its council from 1920 to 1965), and Devon's Recorder for Ancient Monuments (with her uncle Ralegh Radford). She was also a long-serving member and secretary of the Exeter Drama League.
- Ursula Mary Radford (died 1976), an antiquarian who became a Fellow of the Society of Antiquaries in 1948, and served the Devonshire Association in numerous capacities, including as president in 1955; she published four papers in the DA's journal, but her greatest contribution to scholarship was an article in the Antiquaries Journal about medieval wax images found in Exeter Cathedral in 1942. Ursula also donated her father's papers to the Greater London Record Office in 1975; her own collection of miniature books was added to the Bodleian Library in 2010.

== Career ==
=== Local history and antiquarian studies ===
Lady Radford was an enthusiastic antiquarian, and among her works was an edited and annotated version of the Tavistock Charter, which had been granted to the town during the reign of Charles II; it had largely been ignored by local historians before she unearthed it during searches at the Public Record Office in London. She also published a paper on the jurist Henry de Bracton, which inspired substantial local interest in him and the erection of a monument to him in Exeter Cathedral; she was also responsible for the establishment in 1923 of a scholarship in Bracton's name at the University College of the South West. Her other research included studies into Sir Francis Drake's birthplace, and contributions to the Dictionary of National Biography, mostly relating to Devon clockmakers (she was also a collector of Plymouth porcelain and wrote elsewhere on that subject). A member of the Devonshire Association from 1888 until her death, she was the first woman to be elected the Association's President, in 1928. She was elected a Fellow of the Royal Historical Society and was the first Devon woman to be elected a Fellow of the Society of Antiquaries of London.

=== Public service ===
While in London, Lady Radford sat on the Kingston-upon-Thames Board of Guardians as a representative for Surbiton. During the First World War, she was chairman of the Kingston-upon-Thames branch of the Women's Land Army. She was also one of the first women co-opted onto the Old Age Pensions Committees and served on them for six years. She moved to Exeter from the couple's home at Chiswick House, Ditton Hill, Surbiton around the time of her husband's death in 1917, and involved herself with various local organisations, including the Friends of Exeter Cathedral (of which she was a council member) and the West of England branch of the United Association of Great Britain and France, which she helped to found. In 1922, she was appointed a magistrate on the Exeter Bench and was among the first women to hold that role. In 1926, she was one of the founders of the Exeter Workmen's Dwellings Company Ltd. and was keenly interested in slum clearance programmes and the improvement of working-class housing across in the district; her support for a scheme to clear the overcrowded West Quarter district and rehouse families in suburban estates was successful. She also served as President of the Devon and Exeter Institution in 1932.

== Death ==
Lady Radford resided a 2 Pennsylvania Park, Exeter, but died suddenly at Brighton on 26 April 1937. Her funeral service was carried out at Exeter Cathedral and attended by the Mayor of Exeter and other local dignitaries; she was buried afterwards in Lydford Churchyard. Her death was described by the Exeter and Plymouth Gazette as a "loss to Devon".
