= National Party (UK, 1917) =

British political party

- Founder: Oliver Russell, 2nd Baron Ampthill; Sir Richard Cooper, 2nd Baronet; Henry Page Croft
- Founded: August 1917
- Ideology: Germanophobia
- Political position: Right-wing to far-right

The National Party was a short-lived British political party created in August 1917 as a right-wing split from the Conservative Party.

== Formation ==
The party was formed at the height of the First World War, by the Liberal Unionist peer Lord Ampthill, Sir Richard Cooper and Sir Henry Page Croft. Its members took a particularly xenophobic line on the war and were also strongly opposed to the sale of honours. This was reflected in their aims, as outlined in the party's manifesto:

- The abandonment of sectarian, class or sectional interests in favour of a "national" policy.
- "Complete victory in the war and after the war"
- The provision of adequate men and munitions to win the war.
- "The eradication of German influence"
- What they termed "honest politics"
- Unity between employer and employed
- Maximum production from the farms and factories of the United Kingdom, with "fair wages" for the workers and "fair profits" for the employers
- Maintenance of the unity of the British Empire
- A social policy that would ensure "a contented, patriotic race".
- A process to allow for the demobilisation of soldiers and sailors and their reintegration into civilian life.

== Membership ==
Several Conservative MPs joined the party, including Col Richard Hamilton Rawson, Alan Burgoyne, Douglas George Carnegie, Cooper, Croft, Viscount Duncannon and Rowland Hunt. At its peak in 1917, the party had seven MPs and eleven peers.

The newly formed party sought to widen its membership to include "men and women from all parties, not only in England, Scotland, Ireland and Wales, but throughout the British Empire". Liberal Unionist Party MP Edward Fitzroy and former Liberal MPs Edmund Broughton Barnard and Thomas Kincaid-Smith also joined, as did John Jenkins, the former premier of South Australia.

The party was supported by the trade unionist Joseph Havelock Wilson of the National Democratic and Labour Party, though he was never formally a member, as well as the economists William Cunningham and Herbert Foxwell.

== Activities ==
The National Party held public meetings and petitioned the Prime Minister Lloyd George. Its policies included raising the conscription age to fifty and introducing conscription to Ireland, the closing of German banks and businesses in the UK, the internment of enemy aliens, a guaranteed price for home-grown cereals, protectionism for British industry and counter air-raids against German towns.

The close links the National Party alleged to exist between heads of companies and government departments which gave them contracts were attacked. In June 1918 its headquarters in King Street, London, and a number of regional offices were raided by military officers and government officials when the party came into possession of leaked documents.

The National Party had policies to help the working class because "if you wish for a patriotic race, you must aim at a contented people, reared under healthy conditions...and with full scope for advancement". One of its slogans was "no restriction in wages in return for no restriction of output". Occasionally, it co-operated with the National Democratic and Labour Party. It published National Opinion from 1918 until 1923.

Whilst it encouraged working-class support, the party had a core of wealthy and upper-class members. The initial signatories of the declaration were heavily drawn from the aristocracy, senior businessmen, and the professional officer class, with very little working-class representation.

== Relationship with the Tariff Reform League ==
At the 1917 annual general meeting of the Tariff Reform League, a protectionist organisation linked with a faction of the Conservative Party, an attempt was made to merge the league with the National Party. This led to angry scenes, and the motion was eventually withdrawn. The chairman of the League, Lord Duncannon, resigned and announced he was joining the new party.

== Islington East by-election ==
The National Party's first electoral contest was in October 1917, when a by-election was called due to the death of the sitting member of parliament for Islington East. There was a political truce between the parties of the wartime coalition government, and the seat was expected to be filled without a contest. However, the party nominated Edmund Broughton Barnard, chairman of the Metropolitan Water Board to oppose the government candidate, Edward Smallwood. A third candidate, A Baker, was supported by the right-wing MP Noel Pemberton Billing and the Vigilante Society. The party did poorly, Barnard finishing in a distant third place with 513 votes (10.8%). The party held its inaugural meeting two days later and the president, Lord Beresford, declared himself "delighted" with the result which "would have the effect of putting more grit into those who were fighting" for the party.

== Proposed co-operation with the Labour Party ==
The National Party leadership were implacably opposed to the two main parties in parliament: the "defunct" Conservatives and the "discredited" Liberals. Instead they sought to make an alliance with the Labour Party, which they saw as "the great party that was coming". They recognised that the five million working-class men under arms deserved improved conditions and status, and wished to "see what they could do to assist Labour". They also sought to make an alliance with the Merchant Seamen's League, supporting their aims of exacting punishment from the Germans for sinking ships in contravention of international law.

== 1918 general election ==
Most of the party's members rejoined the Conservatives before the 1918 general election. Its remaining 23 candidates ran against the Lloyd George Coalition, two of whom were elected: Croft and Cooper. The candidates were supported by the Earl of Bessborough, his son the Lord Duncannon, the Lord Leith of Fyvie and the Duke of Somerset.

The party received an aggregate total of around 94,000 votes, more than twice the number of votes taken by the fascist New Party in the 1930s.

=== List of candidates ===
- Bethnal Green North East — Lieut. Wilfred Liddell Steel (29.3%)
- Bournemouth — Sir Henry Page-Croft (held, 66.3%)
- Bristol North — Ernest Petter (13.3%)
- East Ham North — W. Mann (41.7%)
- Frome — Thomas Kincaid-Smith (1.1%)
- Gravesend — Harry Hinkley (6.5%)
- Hammersmith North — James C. Walker (19.9%)
- Hampstead — John Harris Wrentmore (9.9%)
- Hertford — Edmund Broughton Barnard (38.8%)
- Islington East — Charles Edward Copplestone (3.0%)
- Kensington South — Brig-Gen Ernest Makins (33.2%)
- Kettering — Algernon F. H. Ferguson (19.9%)
- Leeds North — H. F. Wyatt (6.9%)
- Limehouse — Charles Herbert Roswell (14.9%)
- Manchester Ardwick — Lt. Col. H. M. Stephenson (19.7%)
- Nottingham Central — Arthur Kitson (12.1%)
- Paddington North — Capt. Gordon Aston (23.4%)
- Putney — Hon. John Jenkins (36.4%)
- Rochdale — John Fitzgerald Jones (6.6%)
- Shoreditch — Thomas Warwick (3.0%)
- Thornbury — Major-General Thomas Pilcher (38.0%)
- Tynemouth — Dixon Scott (3.1%)
- Walsall — Sir Richard Cooper (held, 52.3%)
- Wells — Maj. G. C. S. Hodgson MC (4.6%)

A candidate was announced for Leeds North East, Captain W.P. Brigstock, but withdrew without formally being nominated. The sitting member for Ludlow, Rowland Hunt, had joined the National Party in 1917 but had rejoined the Conservatives by the time of the election, as had Edward FitzRoy in South Northamptonshire. Richard Hamilton Rawson, the National member in Reigate, died shortly before the election, in October, and the party did not stand a candidate in this seat.

The party did not stand a candidate in Manchester Rusholme, but put up a candidate for the subsequent 1919 Manchester Rusholme by-election. Roger Bowan Crewdson took only 4% of the vote. Its final contest was the 1920 Dartford by-election, where Reginald Applin stood as a joint candidate with the Independent Parliamentary Group, and took 10.9% of the vote.

The 25 results include 12 where the candidates forfeited their deposits by failing to win an eighth of the vote, costing £1500 in total in 1918 this equates to £74,000 in 2025, when adjusted for inflation.

== Disbandment ==
In April 1921 the National Party was disbanded but was revived under the new name of the National Constitutional Association, led by Oliver Russell, 2nd Baron Ampthill. It held conventions and co-operated with the 4th Marquess of Salisbury to help end the Lloyd George Coalition.
