= Alfred Raper =

British politician

Alfred Baldwin Raper
- Born: 8 May 1889
- Died: 30 April 1941 (aged 51)

Alfred Baldwin Raper (8 May 1889 – 30 April 1941) was a British businessman, air force officer and Conservative politician.

Born in London, he was the son of Walter and Maud Raper of Gerrards Cross, Buckinghamshire. Educated at Merchant Taylor's School and in Brussels, he entered business as a partner in a firm of timber merchants. He travelled widely in connection with his work in Europe and the Middle East. He was a liveryman of the Worshipful Company of Woolmen.

In World War One he obtained a commission in the Royal Flying Corps, qualifying as a pilot in December 1916. He undertook special mission in German-occupied Finland, for which he was awarded the Russian Order of Saint Stanislaus.

In 1917 he was adopted as prospective parliamentary candidate for the constituency of Bethnal Green North East. He subsequently contested Islington East at the 1918 general election as a Coalition Conservative and was elected to the Commons. He sat as a member of parliament for a single term, and did not contest the next election in 1922.

On leaving parliament Raper concentrated on his business interests, much of it involving business in Scandinavia. He was awarded the Order of the White Rose of Finland in 1926 for his work in the promotion of Anglo-Finnish trade.

When the Second World War broke out, Roper made himself available to promote the British cause in neutral countries. In 1940 he made a trip to Sweden on behalf of Lord Halifax, the Foreign Secretary. He went on to make a speaking tour of the United States. He died aged 51 on his voyage back to Britain, when the SS Nerissa on which he was a passenger, was torpedoed by the German submarine, U-552.

He was twice married: in June 1922 he married Elizabeth Marchioness Conyngham of Australia. Following their divorce he married Renée Angêle Rosalie Benoist of France in 1928. He had one daughter from the second marriage, which also broke down.

Parliament of the United Kingdom
Preceded by Edward Smallwood	Member of Parliament for Islington East; 1918 – 1922	Succeeded by Austin Hudson
