= 1931 Islington East by-election =

UK parliamentary by-election

← 1929	19 February 1931	Oct. 1931 →

Constituency of Islington East
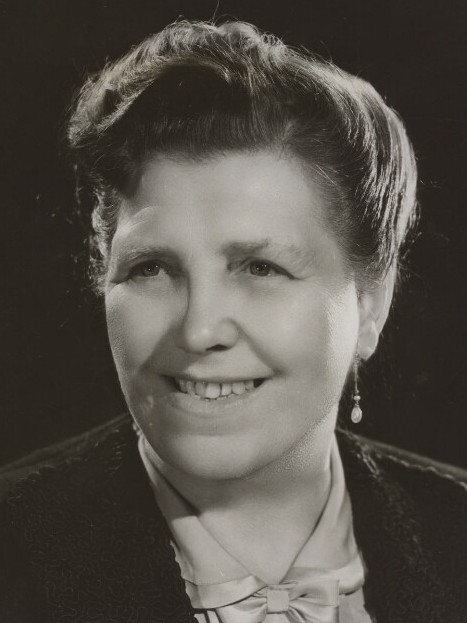

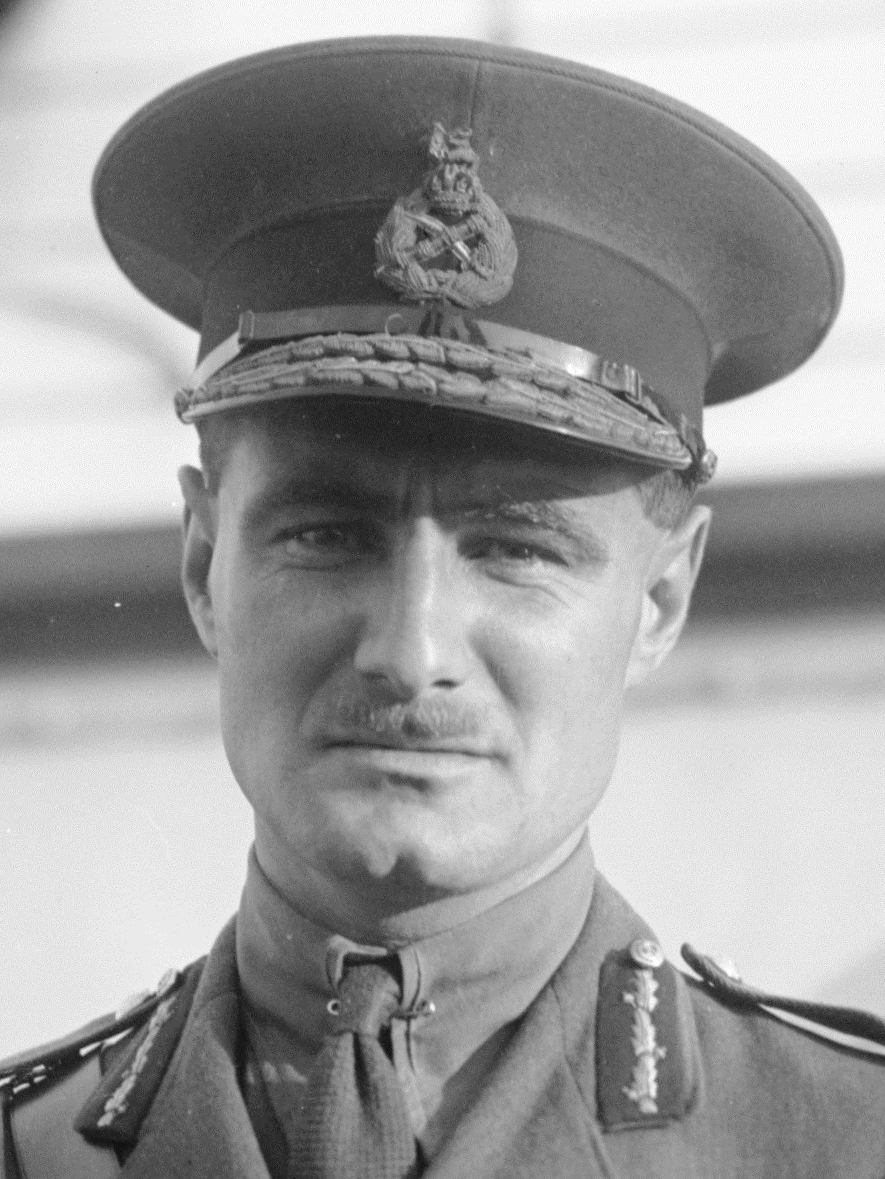

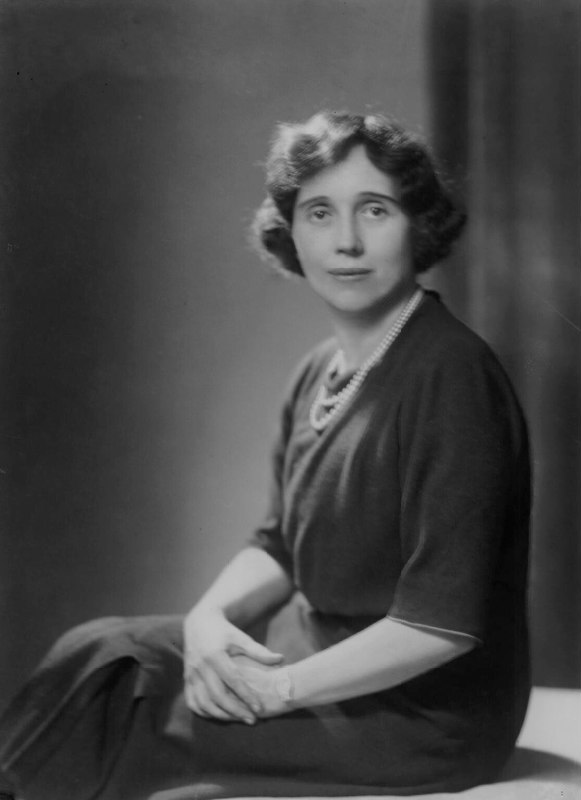
	First party	Second party
Candidate	Leah Manning	Alfred Critchley
Party	Labour	Empire Crusade
Popular vote	10,591	8,314
Percentage	34.7%	27.2%
Swing	▼3.3%	New
	Third party	Fourth party
		Lib
Candidate	Thelma Cazalet	Horace Crawfurd
Party	Conservative	Liberal
Popular vote	7,182	4,450
Percentage	23.5%	14.6%
Swing	▼10.6%	▼13.3%
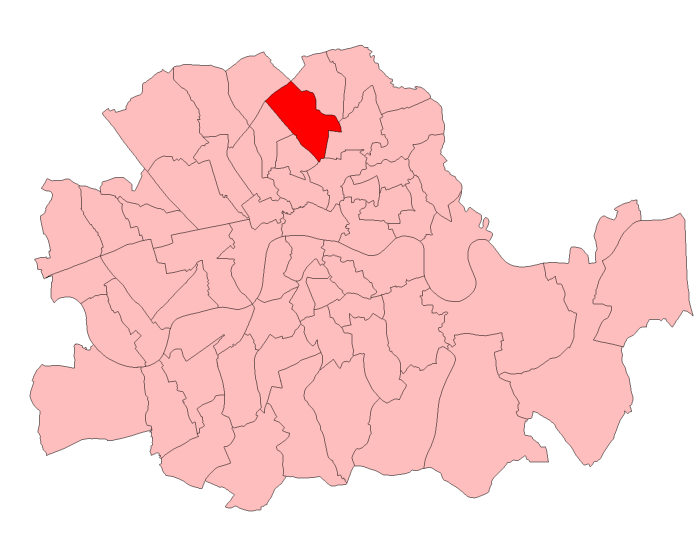
- A map of parliamentary constituencies within the County of London at the time of the by-election, with Islington East highlighted in red.
MP before election
Ethel Bentham
Labour
Elected MP
Leah Manning
Labour

The 1931 Islington East by-election was a parliamentary by-election held on 19 February 1931 for the UK House of Commons constituency of Islington East in Islington, North London.

The seat had become vacant when the Labour Member of Parliament, Dr Ethel Bentham, died on 19 January 1931, aged 70. She had held the seat since the 1929 general election.

== Candidates ==
Labour selected as its candidate the 45-year-old Leah Manning, President of the National Union of Teachers. The Conservative Party candidate was Thelma Cazalet, a 31-year-old feminist and member of the London County Council. The Liberal candidate was Horace Crawfurd, who had been the MP for Walthamstow West from 1924 until his defeat at the 1929 general election.

The fourth candidate, Air Commodore Alfred Critchley, was referred to by Thelma Cazalet as "the Beaverbrook candidate". He stood for the Empire Free Trade Crusade and the United Empire Party, which both sought to make the British Empire a free trade bloc. The Empire Crusade had won the Paddington South by-election in October 1930, and hoped to repeat its success. Critchley had been the Conservative candidate in Manchester Gorton in 1929.

== Result ==
On a reduced turnout, Manning held the seat for Labour with a majority of 2,277 votes. Critchley came second with 27.2% of the votes, a setback for the Empire Crusade.

Islington East by-election, 19th February 1931
Party	Candidate	Votes	%	±%
Labour	Leah Manning	10,591	34.7	−3.3
Empire Crusade	Alfred Critchley	8,314	27.2	New
Conservative	Thelma Cazalet	7,182	23.5	−10.6
Liberal	Horace Crawfurd	4,450	14.6	−13.3
Majority		2,277	7.5	+3.6
Turnout		30,537	50.0	−16.4
Labour hold		Swing		

== Aftermath ==
The Empire Crusade also failed to win the Westminster St George's by-election in March. At the 1931 general election, Cazalet won the seat by a large majority, serving as Islington East's MP until her defeat by Labour's Eric Fletcher at the 1945 general election. After her defeat in 1931, Manning did not return to Parliament until her victory in Epping in 1945. Critchley rejoined the Conservative Party, and won the Twickenham by-election in 1934.

== See also ==
- Islington East (UK Parliament constituency)
- Islington
- List of United Kingdom by-elections
