= Ethel Bentham =

British medical doctor and Labour Party M.P. (1861-1931)

Ethel Bentham JP
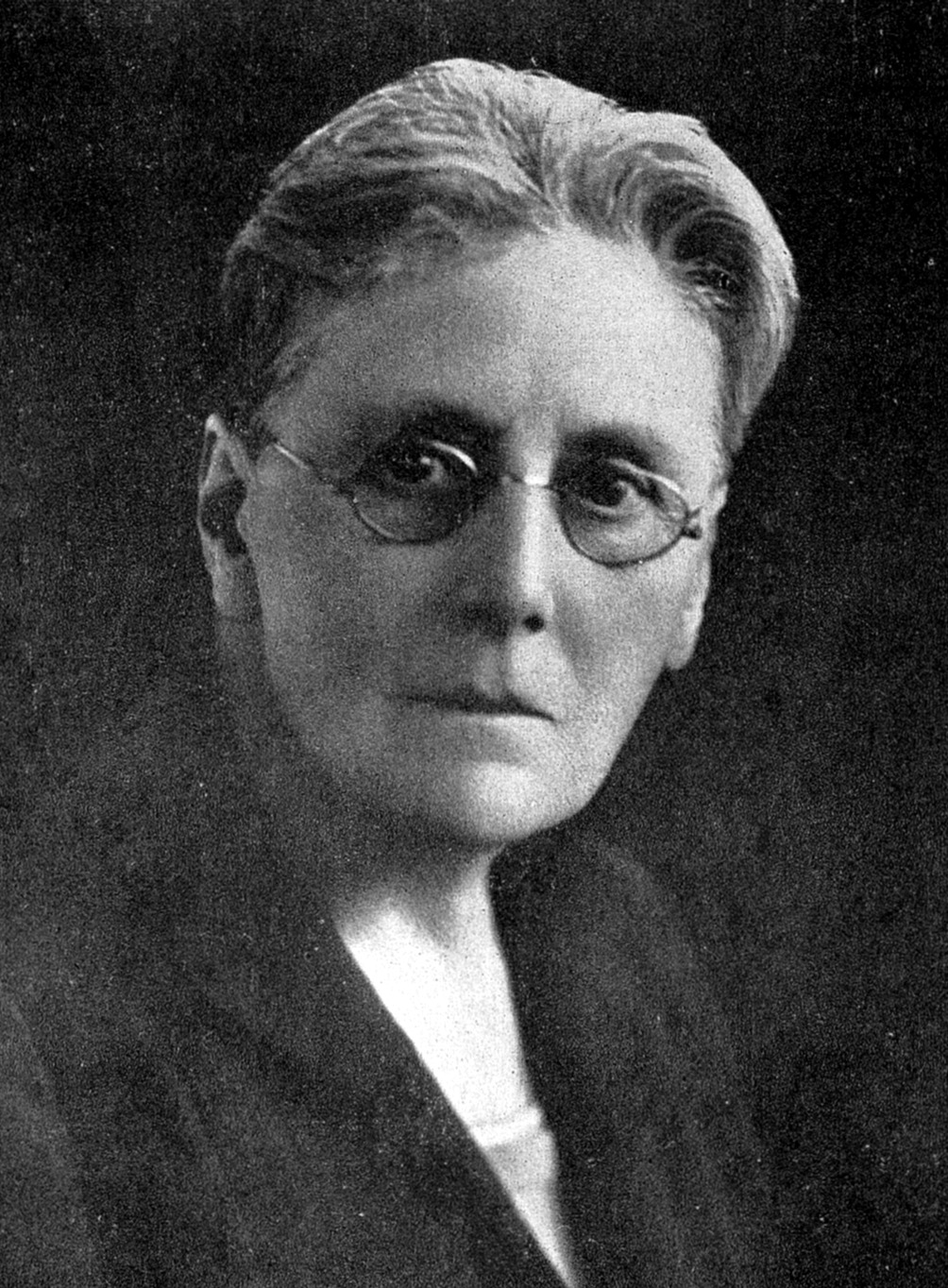
- Ethel Bentham

Member of Parliament for Islington East
- In office 30 May 1929 – 19 January 1931 (Died in office)
- Prime Minister: Stanley Baldwin
- Preceded by: Sir Robert Tasker
- Succeeded by: Dame Leah Manning

Personal details
- Born: 5 January 1861
- Died: 6 January 1931 (aged 70)
- Party: Labour
- Education: Alexandra School and College; London School of Medicine for Women
- Occupation: Medical doctor and politician

Ethel Bentham, JP (5 January 1861 – 19 January 1931) was a progressive medical doctor, a politician and a suffragist in the United Kingdom. She was born in London, educated at Alexandra School and College in Dublin, the London School of Medicine for Women and the Rotunda Hospital.

== Early life and education ==
Bentham was born in London, to William Bentham, an inspector and later general manager of the Standard Life Assurance Company, and Mary Ann Hammond. She was raised in Dublin, where her father was a Justice of the peace. Bentham made charitable trips with her mother to the city's slums, which inspired her to become a doctor. She trained at the London School of Medicine for Women from 1890–1893, gaining a certificate in medicine. In 1894, she qualified in midwifery at the Rotunda Hospital, Dublin and received further training at hospitals in Paris and Brussels, where she received an M.D. in 1895.

== Career ==
=== Medical career ===
Bentham worked in London hospitals for a short time, before entering general practice in Newcastle upon Tyne and Gateshead with Dr Ethel Williams, the first female doctor in the city, and a radical suffragist. In 1900, she was a member of the executive committee of the Newcastle branch of the National Union of Women's Suffrage Societies (NUWSS), and joined the Labour Party in 1902, the Fabian Society in 1907, and the Fabian Women's Group in 1908.

In 1907, she stood as the Labour Party candidate in a by-election in the Westgate South ward of Newcastle. In 1908, she attended the Fourth Conference of the International Woman Suffrage Alliance, in Amsterdam. Bentham was active in pursuing NUWSS support for a joint Suffrage-Labour Parliamentary candidate, a campaign which in 1912 resulted in the creation of the Election Fighting Fund.

In 1909, Bentham moved to London, where she lived with Marion Phillips in Holland Park, her home serving as a meeting place for like-minded women. She established a practice in North Kensington and was an expert on childhood enuresis (bedwetting) and an early believer in what would now be called socialised medicine. In 1911, Bentham was a driving force behind the establishment of a mother and baby clinic in North Kensington, founded by the Women's Labour League in memorial to Margaret MacDonald and Mary Middleton. The clinic was the first in the country to provide medical treatment alongside advice. Bentham served as the clinic's chief medical officer, and benefactor, underwriting its expenses.

=== Political career ===
In March 1910, Bentham became a member of the executive of the Women's Labour League. She stood unsuccessfully as the Labour candidate for Kensington Borough Council in 1909, and London County Council in 1910, before being elected a member of Kensington Borough Council in 1912, representing the ward of Golborne, a position she held until 1925. After World War I she was appointed a magistrate, one of the first women in the role, working in the children's courts and serving on the Metropolitan Asylums Board.

In 1918, the Women's Labour League was absorbed into the Labour Party, and Bentham was elected to the National Executive Committee, coming top of the women's ballot. She sat on the body from 1918–1920, 1921–1926, and 1928–1931. She also served on the Standing Joint Committee of Industrial Women's Organisations, of which she was vice-chair for a time.

She stood unsuccessfully as the Labour Party candidate for Islington East in the General Elections of 1922 and 1923. Bentham was finally successful in the 1929 general election, the fifteenth woman MP, the first ever woman Quaker and doctor, and at 68 years of age the oldest woman to be elected to Parliament. This coincided with the election of the second ever Labour Government headed by Ramsay MacDonald. She spoke only infrequently in the House of Commons in her two years in Parliament. One of her longest speeches was during debate on the Mental Treatment Bill.

She died on 19 January 1931, at her flat in Beaufort Street, Chelsea, just after her 70th birthday, as a result of heart failure following influenza, and was cremated in Golders Green. Bentham's death triggered a by-election, held on 19 February in which the Labour candidate, Leah Manning, was elected to succeed her.

== Private life ==
Bentham never married and had no children. She was raised an Anglican but became a member of the Quaker meeting at Friends House, London in 1920.

== Sources ==
- 2003 (reprint). Times Guide to the House of Commons, 1929, 1931, 1935, Politico's, London. ISBN 1-84275-033-X

Parliament of the United Kingdom
| Preceded by Sir Robert Tasker | Member of Parliament for Islington East; 1929–1931 | Succeeded by Leah Manning |
