= Essie Conway =

English educationist and teacher (1862–1934)

- Born: 24 September 1862; Stourbridge
- Died: 19 December 1934 (aged 72); Sefton Park
- Awards: Commander of the Order of the British Empire (1925)

Essie Ruth Conway (24 September 1862 – 19 December 1934) was an educationist who was the head of a Liverpool school and President of the National Union of Teachers in 1918.

== Life ==
Conway was born in 1862 in "Upper Swinford" which is part of Stourbridge. Her parents were Catherine (born Colvin) and Thomas Conway. Her father was clerk for the railways and then in a corn merchants.

In 1904 she became the head of Tiber Street School which was a large experimental school for over a thousand children of all ages. She was a keen member of the National Union of Teachers and she became the President of the Liverpool branch in 1909.

In 1918 she was elected President of the National Union of Teachers. Isabel Cleghorn was the only other woman who had taken this role in 1911. In 1920 she was appointed to the consultative committee of the Board of Education to represent the NUT and infant education which became a life-long role.

In 1924 the NUT agreed to sponsor a member of parliament irrespective of their party as long as it was a woman. Conway became that candidate however after six years she stood down as till then no Conservative organisation would accept a female candidate. In that year of 1930 Leah Manning became the new President of the NUT and a she was a Labour Party supporter. She was elected in 1931.

In 1933 the Froebel Society launched The Consultative Committee on Infant and Nursery Schools under the chair of Henry Hadow and Conway was on the committee because of the regard for her expertise. The committee invited learned people in the subject area to give evidence and this included the inventor of Montessori education. 440 people sent evidence and twenty organisations.

She retired from Tiber Street in 1926 and died in 1934.
