= Thelma Cazalet-Keir =

British feminist and politician

Thelma Cazalet-Keir CBE
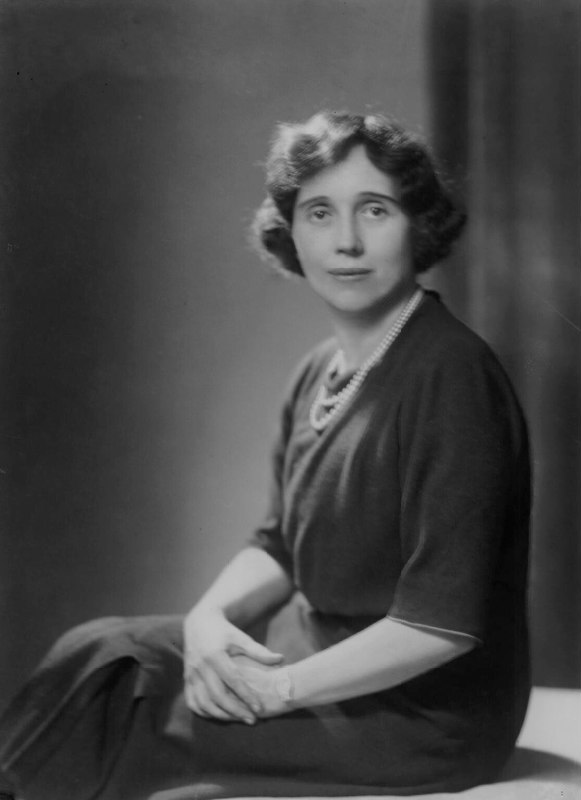

Parliamentary Secretary to the Ministry of Education
- In office 26 May 1945 – 26 July 1945
- Prime Minister: Winston Churchill
- Preceded by: Chuter Ede
- Succeeded by: Arthur Jenkins

Member of Parliament for Islington East
- In office 27 October 1931 – 26 July 1945
- Preceded by: Leah Manning
- Succeeded by: Eric Fletcher

Personal details
- Born: Thelma Cazalet; 28 May 1899 London, England
- Died: 13 January 1989 (aged 89) Eaton Square, London, England
- Party: Conservative
- Spouse: David Edwin Keir (m. 1939; died 1969)

Thelma Cazalet-Keir CBE (née Cazalet; 28 May 1899 – 13 January 1989) was a British feminist and Conservative Party politician.

== Early life ==
Thelma Cazalet was born in London, the third child of four and only daughter of William Marshall Cazalet (1865–1932), and Maud Lucia, née Heron-Maxwell (died 1952). Her father was a wealthy socialite, and in her childhood she met many leading figures of the day, including Rudyard Kipling, Sylvia Pankhurst and Beatrice Webb. Her mother was a feminist Christian Scientist and a strong influence on her daughter. Her eldest brother, Edward, was killed in the Great War, serving as an officer in the newly formed Welsh Guards, at Fricourt in 1916; the middle brother, Victor, served and survived and was also awarded the Military Cross; the youngest, Peter, was still a schoolboy.

Cazalet was educated at home by governesses, and later attended lectures at the London School of Economics. She was a close friend of Megan Lloyd George, the daughter of Prime Minister David Lloyd George and later a Member of Parliament (MP) herself.

== Political career ==
Cazalet entered local politics in Kent, where the family had their country house, Fairlawne, in Shipbourne. Then, in 1924, she was elected to the London County Council, remaining a councillor for seven years, until she became an alderman in 1931.

In 1931, Cazalet stood for Parliament at the Islington East by-election, finishing third in a four-way contest. She was soon back in the Islington East constituency, contesting the general election in October of the same year, when she gained the seat for the Conservatives from the by-election winner, Labour's Leah Manning. She then held the seat until her defeat at the 1945 general election, when the seat went to the Labour candidate, Eric Fletcher.

In the Commons, she joined her brother Victor, the Member for Chippenham, in Wiltshire. On the outbreak of the Second World War, her brother – retaining his seat 'for the duration' – returned to military service. He was killed in Gibraltar in 1943. Thelma's youngest brother, Peter, also served in the war. He fought in Normandy in 1944, as a Guards officer, reaching the rank of Major, and survived the war.

== Later life ==
In August 1939, she married David Edwin Keir, a parliamentary correspondent. Partly for feminist reasons but partly for practical political name-recognition, she now became known as Mrs. Cazalet-Keir. There were no children.

Her proposed amendment to the Education Bill, demanding for equal pay for women teachers, passed by one vote on 28 March 1944. Churchill made the amendment a matter of confidence, and attended in person to ensure its defeat on 30 March. The close result forced Churchill to set up a Royal commission to consider the question of equal pay for equal work (1944–1946). This was one of the events which made Churchill and the Conservatives appear reactionary, contributing to their election defeat in 1945. The result encouraged Cazalet-Keir in her efforts and from 1947 she was chair of the Equal Pay Campaign Committee.

Outside of parliament, Cazalet-Keir was a member of the Arts Council and, later, a Governor of the BBC. In recognition of her public service, she was appointed Commander of the Order of the British Empire in 1952. Cazalet-Keir was a keen feminist and supported the Fawcett Society, becoming the President of the organisation in 1964. She was also a devoted supporter of the Women's Engineering Society, which collaborated with her in her equal pay campaign. In 1967, she wrote her autobiography. For many years, she lived in Kent, at Raspit Hill, not far from her childhood home, but when she was widowed, in 1969, she sold the house and its 75 acres to Malcolm MacDonald, and moved to her London flat in Belgravia. She died in 1989 at Eaton Square at age 89.

Parliament of the United Kingdom
| Preceded by Leah Manning | Member of Parliament for Islington East; 1931–1945 | Succeeded by Eric Fletcher |
