= Leah Manning =

British educationalist, social reformer and Labour Member of Parliament (1886–1977)

Dame Leah Manning DBE
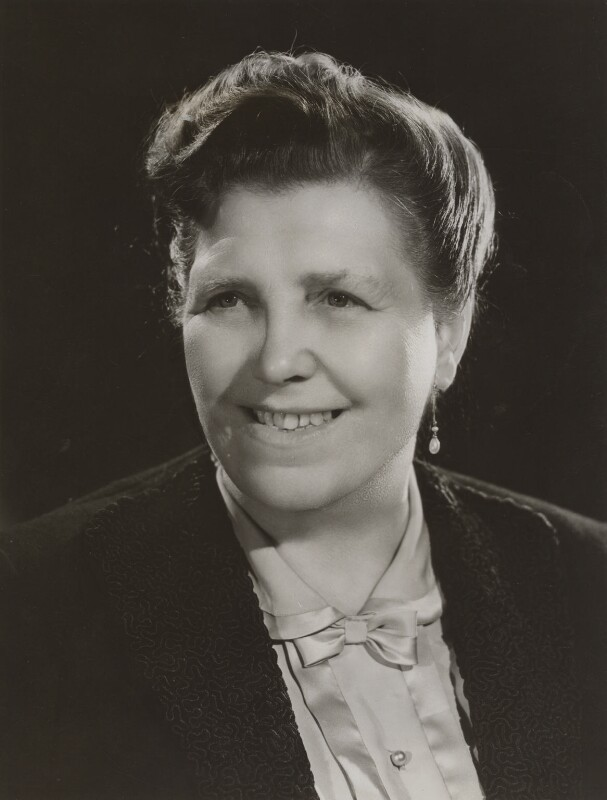
- Manning in 1946

Member of Parliament for Epping
- In office 5 July 1945 – 3 February 1950
- Preceded by: Winston Churchill
- Succeeded by: Nigel Davies

Member of Parliament for Islington East
- In office 20 February 1931 – 27 October 1931
- Preceded by: Ethel Bentham
- Succeeded by: Thelma Cazalet-Keir

Personal details
- Born: Elizabeth Leah Perrett; 28 May 1886 Droitwich Spa, Worcestershire, England
- Died: 15 September 1977 (aged 91) Elstree, Hertfordshire, England
- Party: Labour
- Spouse: William Henry Manning
- Education: Homerton College, Cambridge

Elizabeth Leah Manning DBE (née Perrett; 14 April 1886 – 15 September 1977) was a British educationalist, social reformer, and Labour Member of Parliament (MP) in the 1930s and 1940s. She organised the evacuation of orphaned or at risk Basque children during the Spanish Civil War.

== Early life ==
Manning was born in Droitwich, Worcestershire, the first of twelve children – only six of which reached maturity. Her parents were Charles William Perrett, a captain in the Salvation Army, and Harriet Margaret (née Tappin), a teacher from Bethnal Green. Her parents emigrated to the United States when she was 14, but decided that she (alone among her siblings) should remain in Britain, and she was looked after by her maternal grandparents, who were Methodists. Leah was influenced by her grandfather's Liberal, radical politics.

== Early career ==
She was educated at St John's School in Bridgwater, and at Homerton College, Cambridge, then a teacher training college. She became a teacher in Cambridge where she had met fellow undergraduate Hugh Dalton and joined the Fabian Society and the Independent Labour Party. Her school was in a poor area of the city and she pressed the city authorities to improve the health by providing free milk, using her position on Cambridge Trades Council to raise the issue.

== Personal life ==
She married William Henry Manning (1883–1952), an astronomer working for the University Solar Physics Laboratory, in 1914. They set up home together in a house on the Cambridge Observatory site. He was a pacifist and a Liberal in politics.

== Politics ==
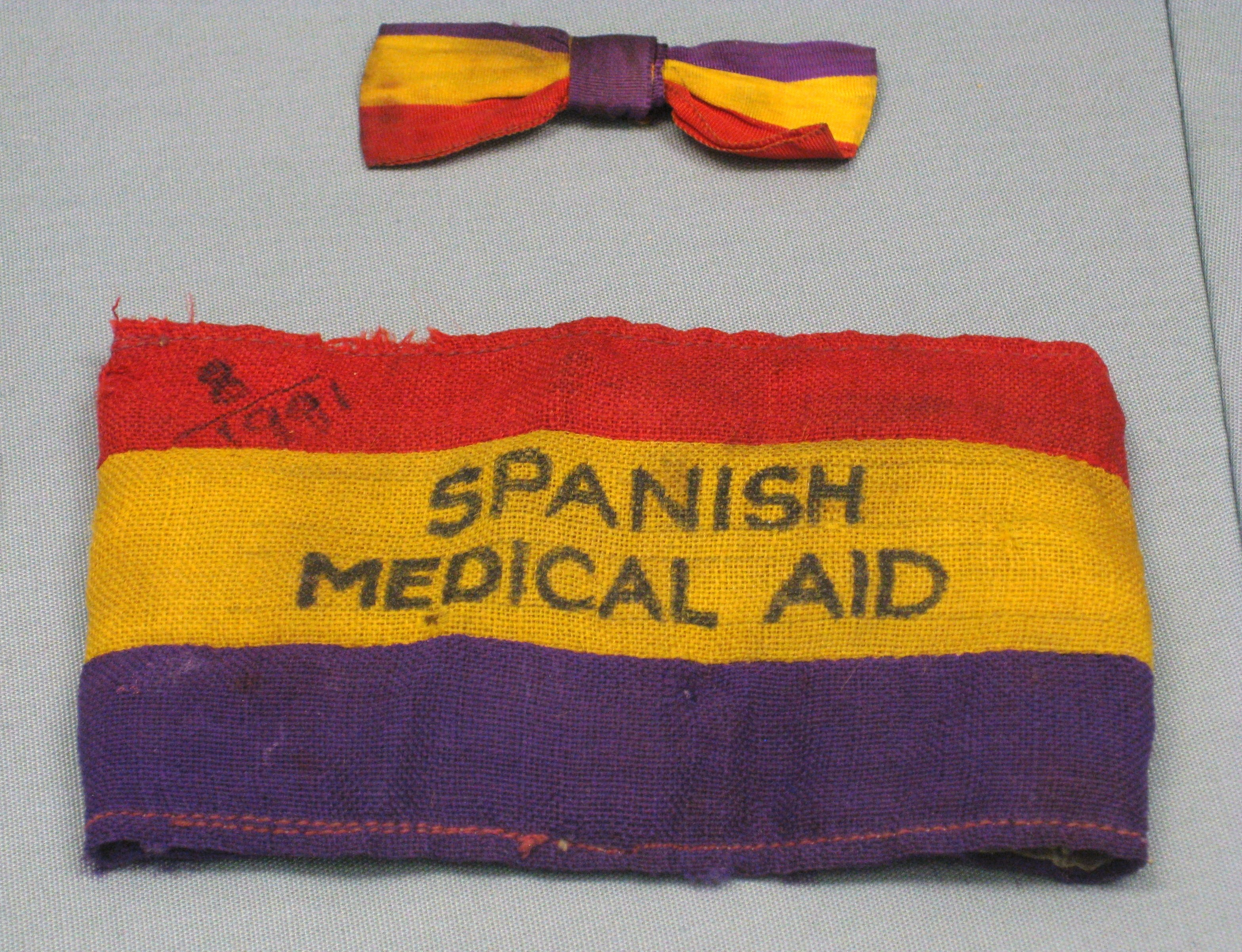
Spanish Medical Aid armband

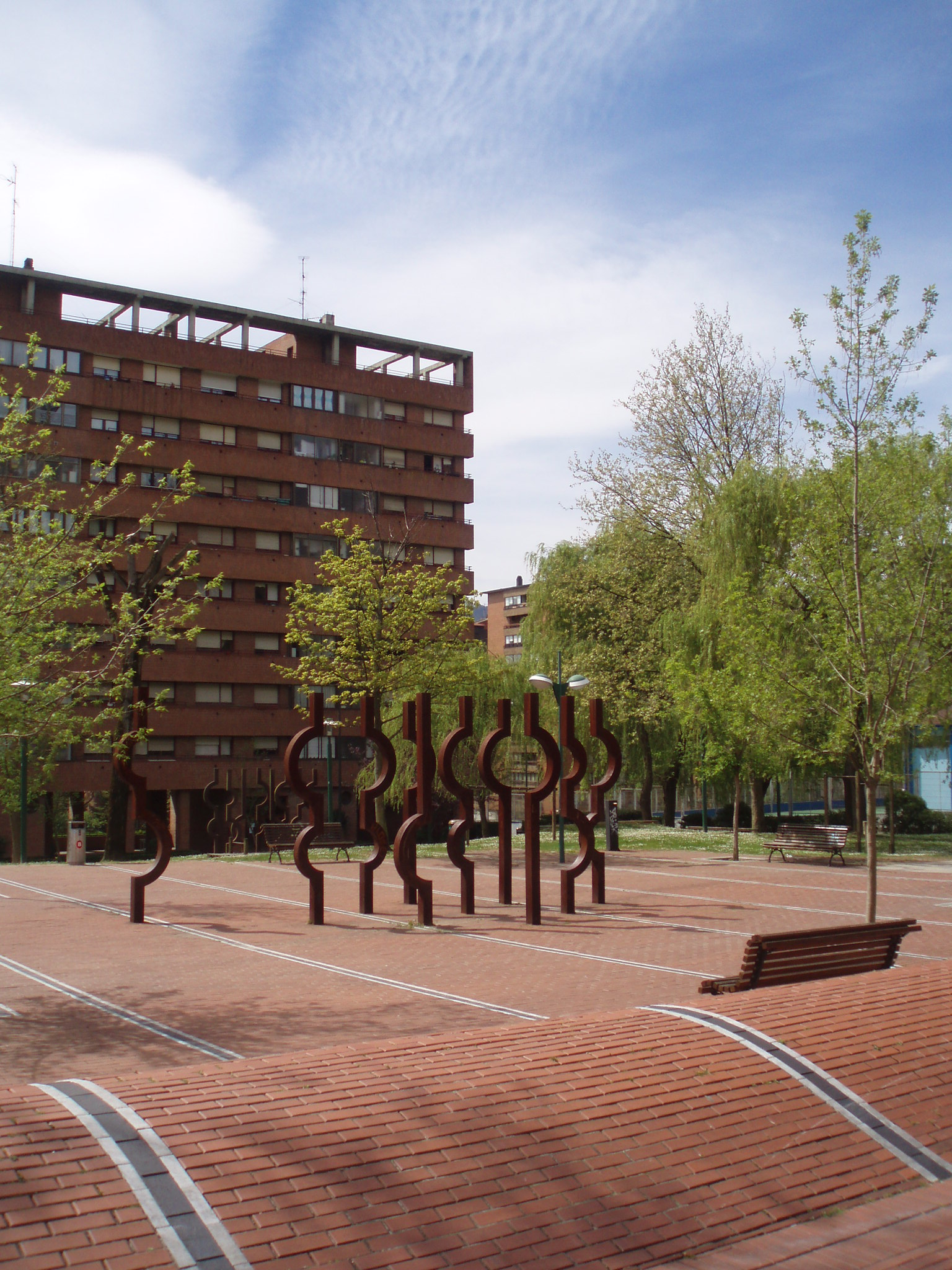
Mrs. Leah Manning Square, Bilbao, Spain

Manning welcomed news of the Russian revolution, and became a member of the 1917 Club. In peacetime, she became an active speaker on behalf of Labour candidates in elections around the country. She was appointed headmistress of a new experimental Open Air School for undernourished children which Cambridge education authority had established on a farm site, and found this work exceptionally rewarding. In 1929, she served as organising secretary of the National Union of Teachers, becoming its president in 1930.

Six years before the NUT had agreed to sponsor a member of parliament irrespective of their party as long as it was a woman. Essie Conway was the choice but no Conservative organisation would accept a female candidate. She stood down and Manning was the heir apparent - and not a conservative.

In 1931, she was elected as MP for Islington East in a by-election on 19 February. She did not support Ramsay MacDonald's National Government and stayed in the Labour Party, losing her seat a few months later at the 1931 general election in October. She served on the National Executive Committee of the Labour Party from 1931 to 1932, and in the 1935 general election unsuccessfully contested Sunderland.

She was meanwhile moving away from her previous strict pacifism towards a more active anti-fascism. Her book, What I Saw in Spain [Victor Gollancz, London, 1935], followed her visit to the country in the wake of the Asturias uprising late the prior year. Manning visited the Model Prison in Madrid and interviewed opponents of the Lerroux Government that had admitted three fascists to Cabinet, the said spark of the uprising.

At the 1936 Labour Party Conference, several party members, including Ellen Wilkinson, Stafford Cripps, Aneurin Bevan and Charles Trevelyan, argued that military help should be given to the Popular Front of Spain, which fought Francisco Franco and his fascist Nationalist Army. Despite a passionate appeal from Isabel de Palencia, the Labour Party supported the Conservative Government's policy of non-intervention.

Manning disagreed with the official line and became Secretary of the Spanish Medical Aid Committee. In the spring of 1937, she helped to arrange the evacuation of almost 4,000 Basque children to Britain as well as around 200 adults, accompanying the children on the SS Habana. While there she witnessed the bombing of Guernica. In 1938, Manning returned to Spain, where she wrote a report on the hospitals where British doctors and nurses were working. Back in England, she continued to be involved with the Basque children, visiting them and highlighting their plight.

Manning was selected as Labour candidate for Epping and won the seat in the 1945 general election. On entering the House of Commons, she would hang her coat on the 'men's' hooks as part of her campaign against discrimination in the House that she began when she first entered in 1930. On 9 March 1946, International Women's Day, Manning chaired an international conference at Beaver Hall in London. In Parliament, she was known for her commitment to education and urging housing provision. She edited a Labour Party pamphlet, Growing up - Labour's Plan for Women and Children detailing plans and party policies for women and children. She also spoke up for a Family Planning Service as part of the newly created NHS. Defeated in the 1950 general election, she unsuccessfully contested Epping again in 1951 and 1955.

== Harlow New Town ==
A key highlight in Manning's political career was her involvement in Harlow New Town as it interested her and her constituents in nearby Epping. Manning served on the Commons Committee considering the 1946 New Towns Bill which proposed a designating New Towns around London to re-house Londoners, one of which was Harlow. Manning favoured the designation of New Towns, particularly Harlow. On 5 July 1946 Manning addressed the House of Commons, explaining that the 1946 New Towns Bill, "will place in the hands of simple, honest, decent, kindly folk a key, opening to them a design of gracious living...I have a special interest in this Bill, because in the constituency which I represent, I hope – indeed, I almost pray – we shall have at one end a new town. At the other end we have a beautiful forest, one of the lungs of the most ugly and depressed parts of London." Indeed, the cottage in which Manning lived would be swallowed up by the development of Harlow.

== Last years ==
Manning was appointed a Dame Commander of the Order of the British Empire in 1966. She remained active in educational work (opposing comprehensive schools) and her autobiography (called A Life for Education) was published in 1970. Her last years were spent in the NUT Home for Retired Teachers at Elstree, England.

Leah Manning died in Elstree on 15 September 1977, aged 91, and left her body to medical research.

== Legacy ==
She was remembered in 2002 by the renaming of a Bilbao square as Plaza de Mrs Leah Manning; a commemorative plaque from the Basque Children of '37 Association was presented to the British House of Commons.

A room is named in her honour at Homerton College, Cambridge.

A blue plaque was erected to Leah Manning in 2020 on the site of the former ragged school in New Street, Cambridge which is now owned by Anglia Ruskin University and is used as their Institute of Music Therapy. Her work on behalf of the new community Harlow New Town has been commemorated in the name of a day care centre for elderly people in Harlow Town Park.

Parliament of the United Kingdom
| Preceded by Ethel Bentham | Member of Parliament for Islington East; February 1931–October 1931 | Succeeded by Thelma Cazalet |
| Preceded by Winston Churchill | Member of Parliament for Epping; 1945–1950 | Succeeded by Nigel Davies |
Trade union offices
| Preceded by C. W. Cowen | President of the National Union of Teachers; 1930–1931 | Succeeded by Angus Roberts |
