= George Radford =

British politician (1851–1917)

Sir George Radford

Member of Parliament for Islington East
- In office 1906–1917
- Preceded by: Benjamin Cohen
- Succeeded by: Edward Smallwood

Personal details
- Born: George Heynes Radford; 17 June 1851 Plymouth, England
- Died: 5 October 1917 Chiswick House, Ditton Hill, England
- Party: Liberal
- Education: London University

Sir George Heynes Radford JP (17 June 1851 – 5 October 1917) was an English solicitor and Liberal politician. He was a member of parliament for Islington East from 1906 to 1917.

== Family and education ==
Radford was born in Plymouth, the eldest son of George David Radford and Catherine Agnes Heynes. He went to London University to study law, where he graduated Bachelor of Laws with honours. In 1882, he married Emma Louisa Radford, the daughter of a Justice of the Peace. They had four daughters and a son; Barbara, Katherine, Cecily, Ursula and George Lawrence.

== Career ==
Radford was admitted as a solicitor in 1872. He joined the firm of Radford and Frankland which had its offices in Chancery Lane, eventually becoming senior partner.

== Politics ==
Radford was first involved in London local politics. He was Progressive Party member for West Islington on the London County Council from 1885 to 1907. In the 1906 general election he became MP for Islington East, a seat he went on to hold, albeit by small majorities, until his death in 1917. Radford always took a prominent part in London County Council elections and was for two years Chairman of the Council's Parliamentary Committee.

== Other appointments and honours ==
Radford served as Chairman of the National Liberal Club Buildings Co. Ltd and was a Vice-Chairman of the Club. He also served as a Justice of the Peace in Surrey, where he had his home at Ditton Hill, now part of Surbiton. He was knighted in the 1916 Birthday Honours.

== Transport ==
Radford had a particular interest in transport in London and a passion for tramways. He noted the advanced use of trams in Budapest and led a British Parliamentary delegation to Hungary in 1906. In 1908, the first cross-river tram in London departed from Holborn Station and it is believed that Radford was responsible for the honour of the maiden trip starting in Islington.

== Papers ==
A collection of scrapbooks of news cuttings, notices, posters etc. donated by Miss U Radford in 1975, documenting Radford's career is deposited in the London Metropolitan Archives . A collection of documents including correspondence, books, photographs, campaign flyers etc. belonging to George Radford and several family members is deposited in the Islington Local History Centre Archive.

== Publications ==
Radford had an interest in literature and published occasional verses and essays. In 1894 he wrote Shylock and Others a selection of eight literary studies (published by T Fisher Unwin) and in 1917 he published Verses and Versicles (T Fisher Unwin). But he also had an interest in Shakespeare. In 1884, the Liberal politician Augustine Birrell published a collection of essays entitled Obiter Dicta (Elliot Stock). Radford had anonymously written one of the essays, on Sir John Falstaff, and this was made public in 1887.

== Death ==
Radford died at his residence, Chiswick House, Ditton Hill on 5 October 1917, aged 66 years.

Parliament of the United Kingdom
Preceded by Benjamin Cohen	Member of Parliament for Islington East; 1906 – 1917	Succeeded by Edward Smallwood
