= Isaac Cowley Lambert =

Isaac Cowley Lambert (1850 – 16 October 1918) was a British solicitor and Conservative member of parliament. Lambert was also a sportsman of note, and captained the Cambridge University rugby team in the very first Varsity Match.

== Early life ==
Lambert was born in 1850 in Stockwell, London; the fifth son of Thomas Lambert of Surbiton. He was educated at Rugby School before matriculating to Trinity College, Cambridge in 1868. Lambert was a keen footballer while at Rugby and because of his old school ties was allowed to join the newly formed Cambridge University rugby team. When the first Varsity Game between Cambridge and Oxford Universities was arranged in 1872, the Cambridge captain was E. Winnington Ingram, but because of Tripos work, he was unavailable to travel to Oxford. Lambert, who played at half back, was elected in his place and lead his team onto the Parks playing field on 10 February 1872. Cambridge lost by a goal to nil, but reports state that Lambert 'played splendidly, saving Cambridge many times.

While still completing his studies, Lambert was admitted at the Middle Temple in 1870, and was awarded his BA in 1873. On 26 January 1874, he was called to the Bar, and received his MA in 1876. Around this period, Lambert travelled to Asia, and published a short field guide, A Trip to Cashmere and Ladak, which was published in 1877 by Henry S. King of London. He was also a Friend of the Royal Geographical Society and a Fellow of the Zoological Society of London.

== Political career and later life ==
Before entering a political career, Lambert followed his legal education, becoming a justice of the peace in Surrey. His one and only election victory was in 1886, when he stood as a Conservative candidate for Islington East. He retained the seat until the 1892 election.

He died 16 October 1918 in Eastbourne.

== Bibliography ==
- Marshall, Howard; Jordon, J.P. (1951). Oxford v Cambridge, The Story of the University Rugby Match. London: Clerke & Cockeran.

Parliament of the United Kingdom
Preceded by Henry Bret Ince	Member of Parliament for Islington East; 1886 – 1892	Succeeded by Sir Benjamin Cohen
