= Sir Benjamin Cohen, 1st Baronet =

British politician

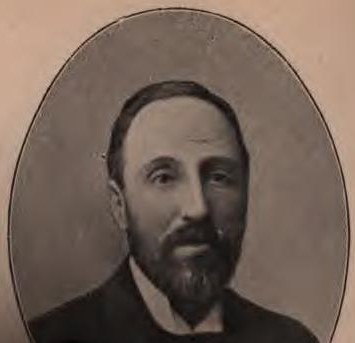
Cohen in 1895.

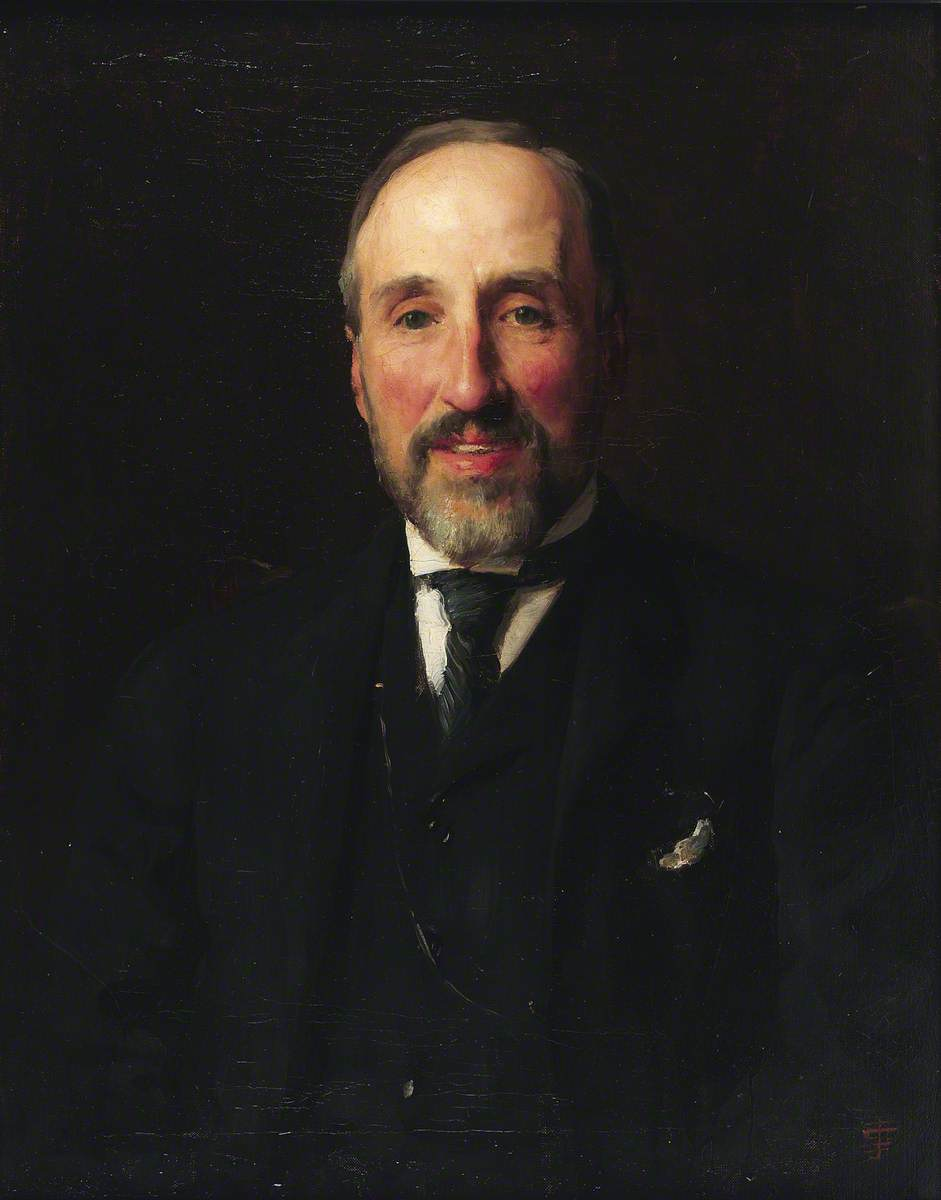

Sir Benjamin Louis Cohen, 1st Baronet (18 November 1844 – 8 November 1909) was a British businessman and Conservative politician.

== Life ==
He was the son of Louis Cohen, a stockbroker, and his wife Rebecca Keyser. After a private education he entered his father's firm. Apart from his business activities he was involved in public and political works and in supporting Jewish charities. In particular he served on the committees of the Stepney Jewish Schools, the Jews' Orphan Asylum and the Home for Aged Jews. He was also the President of the London Orphan Asylum.

In 1887 his brother, Lionel Louis Cohen, president of the Board of Guardians for the Relief of the Jewish Poor, died. Benjamin succeeded him in the post, holding the office until 1900. During his term he was very successful in raising large sums of money for the charity. He also altered the board's constitution, allowing women to be members.

In the 1880s he was involved in the resettlement of Russian Jews, and supported proto-Zionist groups seeking to settle in Palestine.

In 1889 he was elected as one of the members of the first London County Council, representing the City of London for the Conservative-supported Moderate Party. He retained the seat until 1904. His brothers, Alfred and Nathaniel, were also members of the council.

At the 1892 general election he was elected to the Commons as Unionist Member of Parliament for Islington East. He held the seat for eleven years, until he was defeated in the Liberal landslide of 1906.

In 1905 he was created a baronet "of Highfield in the Parish of Shoreham and County of Kent". Cohen died after a long illness at his home in Hyde Park Gardens, London, in November 1909 aged 64.

Parliament of the United Kingdom
Preceded by Isaac Cowley Lambert	Member of Parliament for Islington East; 1892 – 1906	Succeeded by Sir George Radford
Baronetage of the United Kingdom
New creation	Baronet (of Highfield); 1905–1909	Succeeded by Herbert Cohen
