= John Grant (British politician) =

British politician

Under-Secretary of State for Employment
- In office 14 April 1976 – 4 May 1979
- Prime Minister: James Callaghan
- Preceded by: Harold Walker
- Succeeded by: Patrick Mayhew

Parliamentary Secretary to the Ministry of Overseas Development
- In office 18 October 1974 – 14 April 1976
- Prime Minister: Harold Wilson
- Preceded by: William Price
- Succeeded by: Frank Judd

Member of Parliament for Islington Central Islington East (1970–1974)
- In office 18 June 1970 – 9 June 1983
- Preceded by: Eric Fletcher
- Succeeded by: Constituency abolished

Personal details
- Born: 16 October 1932 Finsbury Park, England
- Died: 29 September 2000 (aged 67)
- Party: Labour (Before 1981); Social Democratic (1981–1989)
- Education: Stationers' Company's School

John Douglas Grant (16 October 1932 – 29 September 2000) was a British politician who served as an MP of the United Kingdom parliament from 1970 to 1983. He was as a member of the Labour Party until he left in 1981 to join the new Social Democratic Party (SDP). He represented Islington East from 1970 to 1974 and Islington Central from 1974 to 1983.

== Early life ==
Grant was born in Finsbury Park, North London. He attended the Stationers' Company's School in Hornsey before beginning a career in journalism. He worked for several regional newspapers before managing to secure a post at the Daily Express in 1955 where he covered the trades unions, rising to become the Chief Industrial Correspondent in 1967.

== Parliamentary career ==
Grant combined his career in journalism with an interest in politics and secured the Labour nomination for the Conservative seat of Beckenham which he lost by 13,000 votes in the 1966 General Election. However, for the 1970 General Election, Grant managed to secure the selection for the safe Labour seat of Islington East and was comfortably elected to Parliament.

Grant soon acquired a reputation as an accomplished parliamentarian with particular expertise in trade union matters which he acquired through his many years as an industrial correspondent and his close personal relationships with many of the trade union leaders whom he had covered. Grant served as a minister through the second Wilson and Callaghan governments. After a brief tenure as a Parliamentary Secretary at the Civil Service Department, he was promoted to be Parliamentary Under-Secretary of State at the Ministry of Overseas Development. In 1976, Grant moved laterally to the Department of Employment where he served with great distinction and received much praise for his work helping the disabled.

=== SDP ===
Although Grant was not one of the 14 MPs who initially joined the SDP, he was growing increasingly uncomfortable with the Labour Party. In addition, he was harried in his Constituency Labour Party in Islington which was embroiled in fighting between Labour left and right wings in the local party. After great hesitation, due to his loyalty to his union, the Electrical, Electronic, Telecommunications and Plumbing Union (EETPU), Grant finally left the Labour Party in late 1981.

Grant joined the SDP to immediately become embroiled in internal party conflict over the Tebbit Bill. Although a majority of SDP MPs thought that the party should vote in favor of the second reading of the Tebbit Bill to emphasize the party's distance from Labour and the Trades Union Congress and then offer its own amendments. Grant, along with several other newcomers to the SDP, objected to the bill which he thought would damage industrial relations and would diminish the party's appeal to trade unionists. Grant rebelled against the party whip and led four other MPs into the 'no' Lobby. Although this had no lasting impact on Grant's standing in or relations with other members of the party, it did hurt public perceptions of the SDP's unity.

After boundary changes in which Islington's three constituencies were combined into two a further internal party dispute occurred, as all three Islington MPs had moved from Labour to the SDP. Grant's Islington Central seat was abolished and he sought the nomination for the revised Islington North seat, being selected over sitting MP Michael O'Halloran. However, O'Halloran left the SDP and, after a failed attempt to rejoin Labour, stood against Grant as an Independent Labour. This greatly divided Grant's potential vote and prevented him from offering himself as a viable tactical option to Conservative voters who wished to keep the left-wing Labour candidate, Jeremy Corbyn, out of Parliament. Grant finished third with 8,268 votes, 1,000 votes behind the Conservative candidate and 6,500 votes behind Corbyn.

== After Parliament ==
After losing his seat, Grant became the head of communications for the EETPU. He contested the safe Conservative seat of Carshalton and Wallington for the SDP in 1987, where he finished second. During the merger negotiations between the SDP and the Liberal Party, Grant served on the SDP's negotiating team, but resigned in frustration with the Liberals whom he regarded as "not ready to move from the politics of protest towards power".

=== Return to Labour ===
Following the merger, Grant eventually returned to the Labour fold with the rise of Tony Blair and New Labour. He was a significant influence on Blair's pledge to increase funding for cancer research at the Brighton Labour Party Conference in 2000. Grant had become a vigorous campaigner for cancer research after being diagnosed with prostate cancer. Just over a week after Blair's announcement, Grant died of the disease in 2000 at the age of 67.

Grant wrote two books:

Member of Parliament, 1974 Blood Brothers: 1992

Parliament of the United Kingdom
Preceded by Sir Eric Fletcher	Member of Parliament for Islington East; 1970–Feb 1974	Constituency abolished
New constituency	Member of Parliament for Islington Central; Feb 1974–1983	Constituency abolished
