= Cohen baronets =

Extinct baronetcy in the Baronetage of the United Kingdom

Escutcheon of the Cohen baronets of Highfield

The Cohen baronetcy, of Highfield in the Parish of Shoreham and County of Kent, was a title in the Baronetage of the United Kingdom. It was created on 19 December 1905 for the businessman and Conservative politician Benjamin Cohen. The title became extinct on the death in 1968 of the 2nd Baronet, who survived his two sons.

== Cohen baronets, of Highfield (1905) ==
- Sir Benjamin Louis Cohen, 1st Baronet (1844–1909)
- Sir Herbert Benjamin Cohen, 2nd Baronet (1874–1968)

== See also ==
- Waley-Cohen baronets

Baronetage of the United Kingdom
New creation	Baronet (of Overbury Court, Gloucestershire); 1905–1916	Extinct
Preceded by Martin baronets	Cohen baronets of Highfield; 19 December 1905	Succeeded by Cooper baronets
