= Eric Fletcher, Baron Fletcher =

British politician

The Right Honourable The Lord Fletcher Kt PC FSA FRHistS
- Fletcher, c. 1965

Deputy Speaker of the House of Commons Chairman of Ways and Means
- In office 22 April 1966 – 26 October 1968
- Speaker: Horace King
- Preceded by: Samuel Storey
- Succeeded by: Sydney Irving

Minister without portfolio
- In office 19 October 1964 – 6 April 1966
- Prime Minister: Harold Wilson
- Preceded by: Bill Deedes
- Succeeded by: Douglas Houghton

Member of Parliament for Islington East
- In office 29 July 1945 – 29 May 1970
- Preceded by: Thelma Cazalet-Keir
- Succeeded by: John Grant

Personal details
- Born: Eric George Molyneux Fletcher; 26 March 1903
- Died: 9 June 1990 (aged 87)
- Party: Labour
- Education: Radley College
- Alma mater: University of London

Eric George Molyneux Fletcher, Baron Fletcher, Kt, PC, FSA, FRHistS (26 March 1903 – 9 June 1990) was a Labour Party politician in the United Kingdom.

== Early life and career ==
Fletcher was the eldest of three children of Clarence George Eugene Fletcher (1875-1929), CBE, of Oak Lodge, Bycullah Road, Enfield, London, a barrister and town clerk of Islington, formerly town clerk of Bethnal Green, and, as a recognized authority on the subject, a member of the Advisory Committee set up by the Home Office on registration of electors and conduct of elections, and Nellie Molyneux, formerly of Tooting. He had a brother, Dr (Clarence) John Molyneux Fletcher (father of the historian Anthony Fletcher), and sister, Ena. His paternal grandfather, George Fletcher, was a member of the Metropolitan Police Force attached to the Fulham Division. He studied at Radley College and the University of London and became a solicitor, specialising in international law. He was deputy chairman of the Associated British Picture Corporation.

== Political life ==
Fletcher was elected onto the London County Council for Islington South, serving 1934–49. At the 1945 general election, he was elected as Member of Parliament (MP) for Islington East, defeating the Conservative Party feminist MP Thelma Cazalet-Keir. In Harold Wilson's first government, he served from 1964 to 1966 as Minister without Portfolio, House of Commons spokesman for the Lord Chancellor's Department and then Deputy Speaker.

Fletcher was knighted in 1964, and appointed to the Privy Council in 1967. On 9 July 1970, he was created a life peer as Baron Fletcher, of Islington in Greater London.

== Other work ==
Fletcher served as a member of the Church Assembly of the Church of England in 1962. He was a member of the Senate of the University of London, and a governor of Birkbeck College and the London School of Economics.

Fletcher was a member of the Royal Commission on Historical Manuscripts from 1966, a trustee of the British Museum between 1968 and 1977, and president of the British Archaeological Association from 1960 to 1963.

Fletcher was a keen amateur historian of legal matter and archaeology. He was elected a Fellow of the Society of Antiquaries of London (FSA) in 1954, and was also a Fellow of the Royal Historical Society (FRHistS).

== Arms ==
Coat of arms of Eric Fletcher, Baron Fletcher
Crest (On a cap of maintenance Gules doubled Ermine) a cubit arm vested Sable the shirt cuff of bleached linen Proper linked Or the hand Proper grasping a rolled document in bend sinister Proper and an arrow in bend barb upward Or. Escutcheon Azure two arrows barbs upwards Or between four crosses moline Or. Supporters Dexter a representation of a Saxon Archer of the mid-eleventh century sinister a representation of a Norman archer each supporting with the exterior hand a bow all Proper. Motto Labor Ipse Voluptas (Which can be translated to "Work itself is a pleasure" or "Labor itself is a joy) but has also been cited as (Not Following Meaner Things)

== Archives ==
- Catalogue of the Fletcher papers at the Archives Division of the London School of Economics.

Parliament of the United Kingdom
Preceded by Thelma Cazalet-Keir	Member of Parliament for Islington East; 1945–1970	Succeeded by John Grant
