= Henry Bret Ince =

British barrister and politician (1830–1889)

Henry Bret Ince QC (1830 – 7 May 1889) was a British businessman, writer, and politician.

== Life ==
Ince was the eldest son of Edward Bret Ince, publisher of the Law Journal. He initially worked in shipping until he suffered an accident which limited his mobility and he was forced to change his career. Accordingly, he learnt shorthand and started work as a reporter. He became a leader writer for the Daily News.

He subsequently decided to study law, entering the Inner Temple in 1852. He was called to the bar in 1855. He reported the proceedings in Vice-Chancellor Wood's court for The Jurist.

In 1858, Ince published a legal commentary, "A systematic treatment of the Trustee Act, 1850, (Note: Trustee Act 1850 (13 & 14 Vict. c. 60)) and the Extension Act of 1852". (Note: Trustee Act 1852 (15 & 16 Vict. c. 55)) He migrated to Lincoln's Inn ad eundem in 1859. On 28 June 1875, he took silk, and he was made a bencher of Lincoln's Inn on 4 November 1878. He was elected Liberal Member of Parliament for Hastings in 1883. When that constituency was reduced by a member in 1885, he was returned for Islington East, but was defeated in 1886.

In 1862 he married Annie Muggeridge of Twickenham. He died suddenly from a brain aneurysm at his chambers in Lincoln's Inn in May 1889.

== Notes ==
Parliament of the United Kingdom
Preceded by Thomas Brassey; Charles James Murray	Member of Parliament for Hastings; 1883–1885; With: Thomas Brassey	Succeeded by Thomas Brassey
New constituency	Member of Parliament for Islington East; 1885–1886	Succeeded by Isaac Cowley Lambert
