= Edward Smallwood =

Edward Smallwood

Edward Smallwood (1861 – 26 February 1939) was an English coal merchant and Liberal Party politician.

== Family and education ==
Smallwood was the son of James and Mary Smallwood from Birchwood, Derbyshire. He was educated at Doncaster Grammar School. In 1887, he married Mildred Fenemore of Steeple Aston. They had two sons who died in World War One (as noted on their gravestone in Abney Park cemetery in Stoke Newington) and one daughter.

== Career ==
Smallwood established himself in London in 1877 and spent his whole working life in the coal business. He was the first President of the Coal Merchants’ Federation of Great Britain from 1918–1921 and Chairman of the Society of Coal Merchants, London in 1931.

== Politics and public life ==
=== Politics ===
Smallwood made his home in Islington, living in the east of the Borough. He represented the area as a Liberal on the Borough Council, as a Progressive on the London County Council (from 1910–1917, having failed to be elected in 1907). He eventually got into Parliament as Liberal candidate at a by-election in 1917 following the death of the sitting Liberal MP Sir George Radford.

Smallwood contested the 1918 general election in Islington East as an independent Asquithian Liberal but was opposed by four other candidates. These included Alfred Baldwin Raper, a wartime airforce pilot and timber merchant. Raper was the Conservative candidate and had been awarded the Coalition Coupon and he took the seat by a majority of 3,384 votes and nearly 50% of the poll.

Smallwood tried to re-enter Parliament at the 1922 general election as Liberal candidate in East Ham South and in the same seat in 1923 both times losing to Labour and Co-op candidate A J Barnes. He did not stand for Parliament again.

=== Other community work ===
To support his political career, Smallwood had undertaken charitable and social work in London. He was also a supporter of the Lords Day Observance Society, speaking at their meetings.

Parliament of the United Kingdom
Preceded by George Radford	Member of Parliament for Islington East; 1917 – 1918	Succeeded by Alfred Raper
