= Islington Central =

UK Parliament constituency (1974–1983)

- Former borough constituency for the House of Commons

February 1974–1983
- Seats: one
- Created from: Islington East and Islington South West
- Replaced by: Islington North and Islington South & Finsbury

Islington Central was a parliamentary constituency in the Islington district of Inner London. It returned one Member of Parliament (MP) to the House of Commons of the Parliament of the United Kingdom.

The constituency was created for the February 1974 general election, and abolished for the 1983 general election.

== Boundaries ==
The London Borough of Islington wards of Canonbury, Highbury, Holloway, Mildmay, and Quadrant.

== Members of Parliament ==
Election	Member	Party
Feb 1974	John Grant	Labour
1981	John Grant	SDP
1983	constituency abolished	

== Election results ==
=== Elections in the 1970s ===
General election 1979: Islington Central
Party	Candidate	Votes	%	±%
Labour	John Grant	13,415	51.5	−7.0
Conservative	Charles Goodson-Wickes	9,276	35.6	+14.5
Liberal	Marie Dunn	2,242	8.6	−6.5
National Front	Stewart Chaney	797	3.1	−2.2
Ecology	Adrian Williams	310	1.2	New
Majority		4,139	15.9	−21.5
Turnout		26,040	63.7	+8.3
Labour hold		Swing		

General election October 1974: Islington Central
Party	Candidate	Votes	%	±%
Labour	John Grant	14,689	58.5	+4.6
Conservative	C. Stanbrook	5,296	21.1	−2.9
Liberal	P.W. Murphy	3,786	15.1	−7.0
National Front	R. Score	1,335	5.3	New
Majority		9,393	37.4	+7.5
Turnout		25,106	55.4	−9.2
Labour hold		Swing		

General election February 1974: Islington Central
Party	Candidate	Votes	%	±%
Labour	John Grant	15,687	53.9	
Conservative	Richard Devonald-Lewis	6,996	24.0	
Liberal	I. Stuart	6,447	22.1	
Majority		8,691	29.9	
Turnout		29,130	64.6	
Labour win (new seat)				

== See also ==
- List of parliamentary constituencies in Islington
