= Islington East =

Parliamentary constituency in the United Kingdom, 1885–1974

- Former borough constituency for the House of Commons

1885–February 1974
- Seats: one
- Created from: Finsbury
- Replaced by: Islington Central and Islington North

Islington East was a constituency which returned one Member of Parliament (MP) to the House of Commons of the Parliament of the United Kingdom from 1885, until it was abolished for the February 1974 general election.

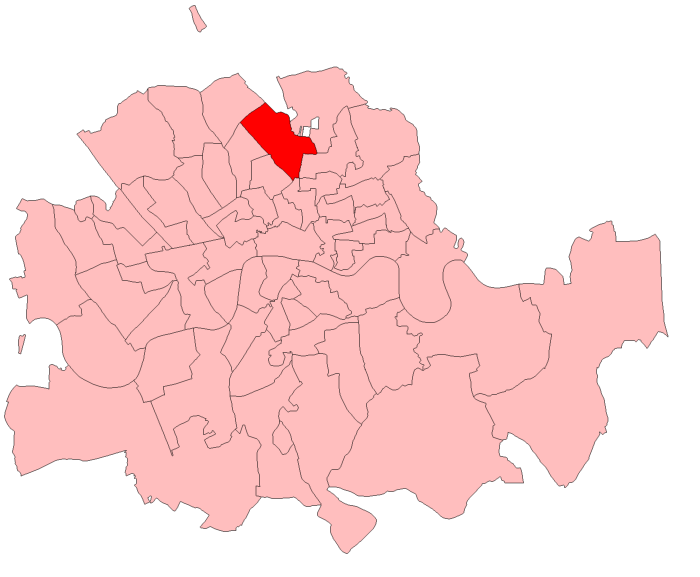
Islington East in the Metropolitan area, showing boundaries used 1885–1918

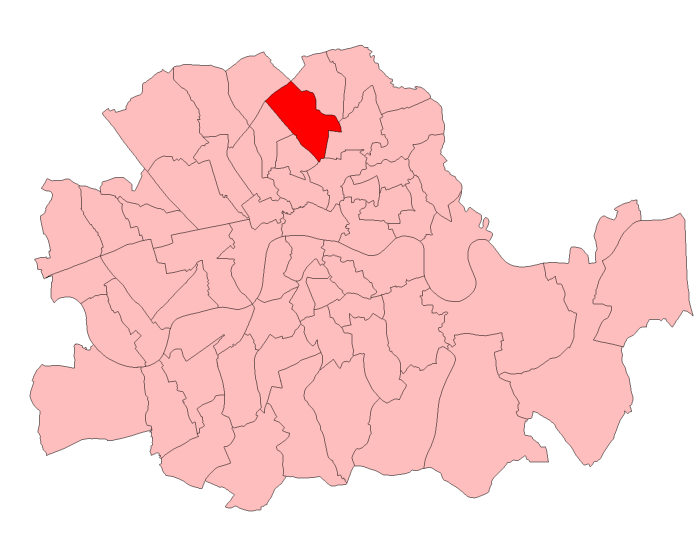
Islington East in the Parliamentary County of London, showing boundaries used 1918–50

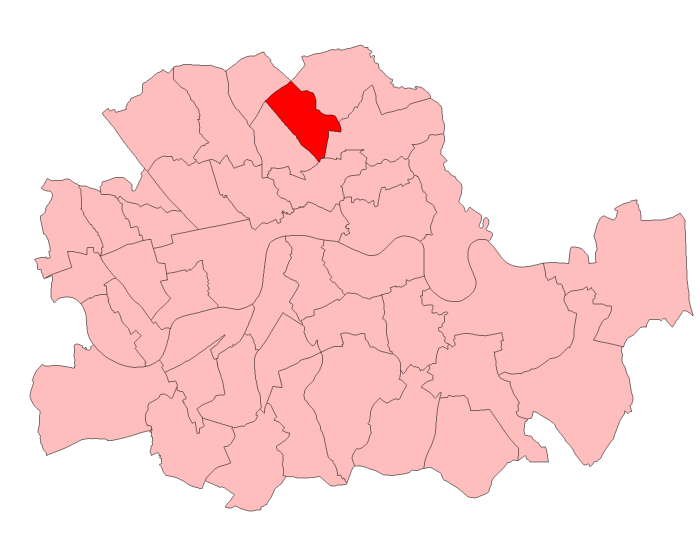
Islington East in the Parliamentary County of London, showing boundaries used 1950–74

A map showing the wards of Islington Metropolitan Borough as they appeared in 1916.

== Boundaries ==
=== 1885–1918 ===
The seat was created by the Redistribution of Seats Act 1885 as one of four divisions of the new parliamentary borough of Islington. The parliamentary borough was coterminous with the civil parish of Islington and each of the four divisions consisted of a number of parish wards used for the election of vestrymen to the incorporated vestry, the local authority for the area.

The East Division consisted of two wards: Canonbury and Highbury.

=== 1918–1974 ===
Constituencies throughout Great Britain and Ireland were reorganised by the Representation of the People Act 1918. In London, seats were realigned to the boundaries of the metropolitan boroughs that had been created in 1900. The Metropolitan Borough of Islington was divided into four constituencies with the Islington, East seat consisting of three wards as they existed in 1918: Canonbury, Highbury and Mildmay. At the next parliamentary redistribution, prior to the 1950 general election, the seat was unchanged.

The seat was last contested at the 1970 general election. By the time of the next election in 1974, new constituencies had been drawn based on the London boroughs created in 1965. The London Borough of Islington was divided between three constituencies, with the area of the abolished East seat mostly falling in the new Islington Central constituency.

In 1966, 11% of the constituency was born in the New Commonwealth.

== Members of Parliament ==
Election	Member	Party
1885	Henry Bret Ince	Liberal
1886	Isaac Cowley Lambert	Conservative
1892	Sir Benjamin Cohen	Conservative
1906	Sir George Radford	Liberal
1917 by-election	Edward Smallwood	Liberal
1918	Alfred Raper	Coalition Conservative
1922	Austin Hudson	Conservative
1923	Arthur Comyns Carr	Liberal
1924	Robert Tasker	Conservative
1929	Ethel Bentham	Labour
1931 by-election	Leah Manning	Labour
1931	Thelma Cazalet, later Cazalet-Keir	Conservative
1945	Sir Eric Fletcher	Labour
1970	John Grant	Labour
Feb 1974	constituency abolished	

== Election results ==
=== Elections in the 1880s ===
General election 1885: Islington, East
Party	Candidate	Votes	%	±%
Liberal	Henry Bret Ince	3,296	50.3	
Conservative	Isaac Lambert	3,262	49.7	
Majority		34	0.6	
Turnout		6,558	81.0	
Registered electors		8,092		
Liberal win (new seat)				

General election 1886: Islington, East
Party	Candidate	Votes	%	±%
Conservative	Isaac Lambert	3,732	61.5	+11.8
Liberal	Henry Bret Ince	2,336	38.5	−11.8
Majority		1,396	23.0	N/A
Turnout		6,608	75.0	−6.0
Registered electors		8,092		
Conservative gain from Liberal		Swing	+11.8	

=== Elections in the 1890s ===
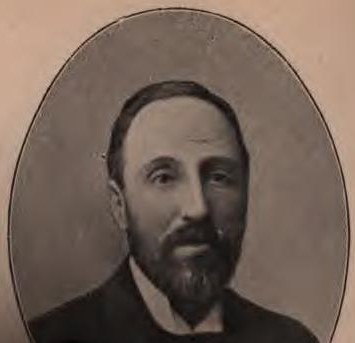
Benjamin Cohen

General election 1892: Islington, East
Party	Candidate	Votes	%	±%
Conservative	Benjamin Cohen	3,975	53.1	−8.4
Liberal	Percy Bunting	3,510	46.9	+8.4
Majority		465	6.2	−16.8
Turnout		7,485	75.8	+0.8
Registered electors		9,872		
Conservative hold		Swing	−8.4	

General election 1895: Islington, East
Party	Candidate	Votes	%	±%
Conservative	Benjamin Cohen	4,383	58.1	+5.0
Liberal	McKinnon Wood	3,159	41.9	−5.0
Majority		1,224	16.2	+10.0
Turnout		7,542	74.0	−1.8
Registered electors		10,191		
Conservative hold		Swing	+5.0	

=== Elections in the 1900s ===
Andrew Torrance

General election 1900: Islington, East
Party	Candidate	Votes	%	±%
Conservative	Benjamin Cohen	4,205	61.9	+3.8
Liberal	Andrew Mitchell Torrance	2,586	38.1	−3.8
Majority		1,619	23.8	+7.6
Turnout		6,791	65.3	−8.7
Registered electors		10,395		
Conservative hold		Swing	+3.8	

G.H. Radford

General election 1906: Islington, East
Party	Candidate	Votes	%	±%
Liberal	George Radford	4,477	54.7	+16.6
Conservative	Benjamin Cohen	3,710	45.3	−16.6
Majority		767	9.4	N/A
Turnout		8,187	75.9	+10.6
Registered electors		10,786		
Liberal gain from Conservative		Swing	+16.6	

=== Elections in the 1910s ===
General election January 1910: Islington, East
Party	Candidate	Votes	%	±%
Liberal	George Radford	5,001	51.7	−3.0
Conservative	J.H.T. Keeves	4,671	48.3	+3.0
Majority		330	2.4	−7.0
Turnout		11,118	87.0	+11.1
Liberal hold		Swing		

General election December 1910: Islington, East
Party	Candidate	Votes	%	±%
Liberal	George Radford	4,503	50.7	−1.0
Conservative	Philip Pilditch	4,378	49.3	+1.0
Majority		125	1.4	−1.0
Turnout		11,118	79.9	−7.1
Liberal hold		Swing		

General election 1914–15:

Another general election was required to take place before the end of 1915. The political parties had been making preparations for an election to take place and by the July 1914, the following candidates had been selected;

- Liberal: Edward Smallwood
- Unionist: Philip Pilditch

E. Smallwood

1917 Islington East by-election
Party	Candidate	Votes	%	±%
Liberal	Edward Smallwood	2,709	57.0	+6.3
Independent	Alfred Baker	1,532	32.2	New
National	Edmund Broughton Barnard	513	10.8	New
Majority		1,177	24.8	+23.4
Turnout		4,754	36.9	−43.0
Liberal hold		Swing		

General election 1918: Islington East
Party		Candidate	Votes	%	±%
C	Unionist	Alfred Raper	9,352	48.8	−0.5
	Liberal	Edward Smallwood	5,968	31.1	−19.6
	Labour	Arthur John Lewer	3,122	16.3	New
	National	Charles Edward Copplestone	575	3.0	N/A
	Independent	Frederick Alfred Wickhart	147	0.8	New
Majority			3,384	17.7	N/A
Turnout			19,164	51.7	−28.2
Registered electors			37,078		
	Unionist gain from Liberal		Swing	+9.6	
C indicates candidate endorsed by the coalition government.

=== Elections in the 1920s ===
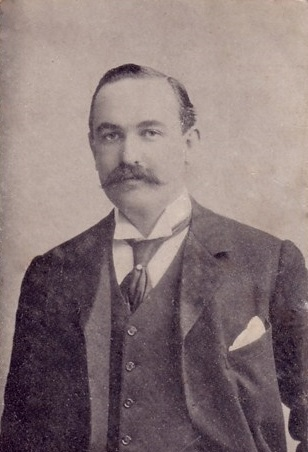
Sir G. Baring

General election 1922: Islington East
Party	Candidate	Votes	%	±%
Unionist	Austin Hudson	11,954	46.1	−2.7
Liberal	Godfrey Baring	8,107	31.2	+0.1
Labour	Ethel Bentham	5,900	22.7	+6.4
Majority		3,847	14.9	−2.8
Turnout		25,961	59.4	+7.7
Registered electors		43,676		
Unionist hold		Swing	−1.4	

A. Comyns Carr

General election 1923: Islington East
Party	Candidate	Votes	%	±%
Liberal	Arthur Comyns Carr	10,670	40.1	+8.9
Unionist	Austin Hudson	9,038	33.9	−12.2
Labour	Ethel Bentham	6,941	26.0	+3.3
Majority		1,632	6.2	N/A
Turnout		26,649	60.0	+0.6
Registered electors		44,402		
Liberal gain from Unionist		Swing	+10.6	

General election 1924: Islington East
Party	Candidate	Votes	%	±%
Unionist	Robert Tasker	14,174	44.5	+10.6
Labour	Ethel Bentham	10,280	32.3	+6.3
Liberal	Arthur Comyns Carr	7,406	23.2	−16.9
Majority		3,894	12.2	N/A
Turnout		31,860	70.8	+10.8
Registered electors		44,978		
Unionist gain from Liberal		Swing	−2.2	

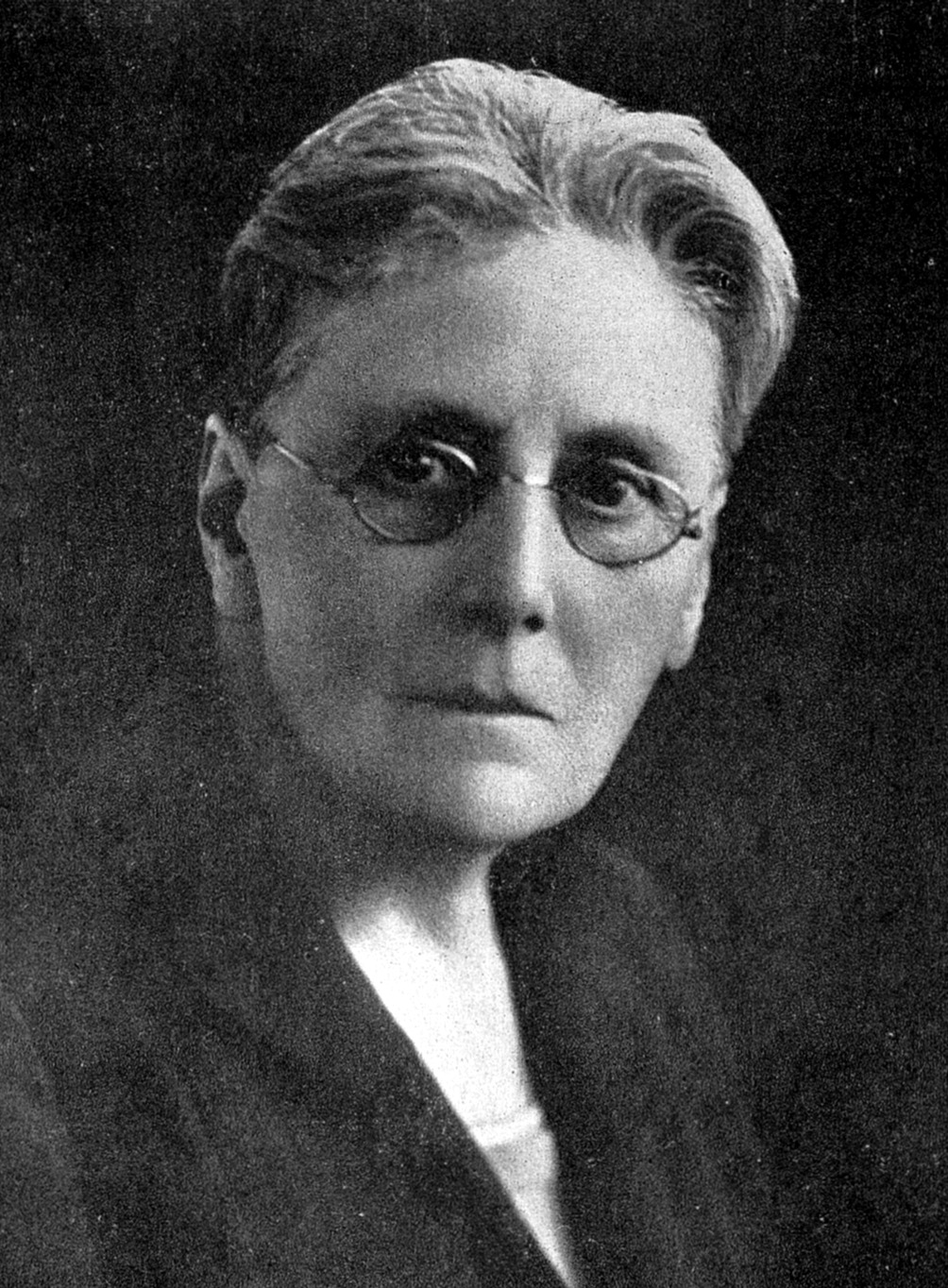
Ethel Bentham

General election 1929: Islington East
Party	Candidate	Votes	%	±%
Labour	Ethel Bentham	15,199	38.0	+5.7
Unionist	Robert Tasker	13,641	34.1	−10.4
Liberal	Edgar Middleton	11,136	27.9	+4.7
Majority		1,558	3.9	N/A
Turnout		39,976	66.4	−4.4
Registered electors		60,202		
Labour gain from Unionist		Swing	+8.1	

=== Elections in the 1930s ===
Islington East by-election, 19 February 1931
Party	Candidate	Votes	%	±%
Labour	Leah Manning	10,591	34.7	−3.3
Empire Crusade	Alfred Critchley	8,314	27.2	New
Conservative	Thelma Cazalet	7,182	23.5	−10.6
Liberal	Horace Crawfurd	4,450	14.6	−13.3
Majority		2,277	7.5	+3.6
Turnout		30,537	50.0	−16.4
Labour hold		Swing		

General election 1931: Islington East
Party	Candidate	Votes	%	±%
Conservative	Thelma Cazalet	27,221	67.5	+44.0
Labour	Leah Manning	13,111	32.5	−2.2
Majority		14,110	35.0	+27.5
Turnout		40,332	65.4	+15.4
Conservative gain from Labour		Swing	+23.1	

General election 1935: Islington East
Party	Candidate	Votes	%	±%
Conservative	Thelma Cazalet	18,248	52.5	−15.0
Labour	Gwyn D. Jones	13,810	39.8	+7.3
Liberal	Cyril Harry Blackburn	2,670	7.7	New
Majority		4,438	12.7	−22.3
Turnout		34,728	57.8	−7.6
Conservative hold		Swing	−11.2	

General election 1939–40

Another general election was required to take place before the end of 1940. The political parties had been making preparations for an election to take place, and the following candidates had been selected by the Autumn of 1939:

- Conservative: Thelma Cazalet
- Labour: H C Boyde
- Liberal: Cyril Blackburn

=== Elections in the 1940s ===
General election 1945: Islington East
Party	Candidate	Votes	%	±%
Labour	Eric Fletcher	18,936	65.5	+25.7
Conservative	Thelma Cazalet-Keir	9,960	34.5	−18.0
Majority		14,110	35.0	N/A
Turnout		28,896	66.2	+8.4
Labour gain from Conservative		Swing	+22.4	

=== Elections in the 1950s ===
General election 1950: Islington East
Party	Candidate	Votes	%	±%
Labour	Eric Fletcher	22,477	55.96	
Conservative	Katherine Wilmot	14,385	35.82	
Liberal	Thomas Herbert Coss Billson	3,301	8.22	New
Majority		8,062	20.14	
Turnout		40,163	79.30	
Labour hold		Swing		

General election 1951: Islington East
Party	Candidate	Votes	%	±%
Labour	Eric Fletcher	23,896	59.9	+3.9
Conservative	Katherine Wilmot	16,000	40.1	+4.3
Majority		7,896	19.79	−0.3
Turnout		39,896	78.23	−0.97
Labour hold		Swing		

General election 1955: Islington East
Party	Candidate	Votes	%	±%
Labour	Eric Fletcher	19,612	60.3	+0.4
Conservative	Geoffrey Finsberg	12,910	39.7	−0.4
Majority		6,702	20.61	+0.82
Turnout		32,522	66.06	−12.1
Labour hold		Swing		

General election 1959: Islington East
Party	Candidate	Votes	%	±%
Labour	Eric Fletcher	17,776	57.56	−2.74
Conservative	Kenneth C Burden	13,097	42.44	+2.74
Majority		4,669	15.12	−5.47
Turnout		30,683	63.49	−2.57
Labour hold		Swing		

=== Elections in the 1960s ===
General election 1964: Islington East
Party	Candidate	Votes	%	±%
Labour	Eric Fletcher	14,192	52.48	−5.08
Conservative	Kenneth C Burden	7,715	28.53	−13.91
Liberal	Joel Freedman	3,081	11.39	New
New Liberal	Alan Ernest Lomas	2,053	7.59	New
Majority		6,477	23.95	+8.83
Turnout		27,041	57.11	−6.38
Labour hold		Swing		

General election 1966: Islington East
Party	Candidate	Votes	%	±%
Labour	Eric Fletcher	15,009	57.92	+5.44
Conservative	John B W Holderness	7,490	28.90	+0.37
Liberal	Joel Freedman	2,288	8.83	−2.56
New Liberal	Alan Ernest Lomas	1,127	4.35	−3.24
Majority		7,519	29.02	+5.07
Turnout		25,914	57.06	+0.95
Labour hold		Swing		

=== Elections in the 1970s ===
General election 1970: Islington East
Party	Candidate	Votes	%	±%
Labour	John Grant	13,980	61.75	+3.83
Conservative	Richard Devonald-Lewis	8,660	38.25	+9.35
Majority		5,320	23.50	−5.52
Turnout		22,350	51.80	−5.26
Labour hold		Swing		

== See also ==
- 1931 Islington East by-election
- List of parliamentary constituencies in Islington
