= Hal Cazalet =

British opera singer

Henry Pelham "Hal" Cazalet (born 16 September 1969) is a British tenor opera singer.

== Early life ==
Cazalet is the son of Sir Edward Cazalet, a retired High Court judge, and his wife, the Honourable Camilla Jane Gage, daughter of Henry Gage, 6th Viscount Gage. His paternal grandfather was Major Peter Cazalet, the well-known racehorse trainer.

He has an older brother, David Benedict Cazalet and a younger sister, the actress Lara Cazalet, with whom Cazalet sings professionally in a jazz trio.

Education

Cazalet attended the Dragon School in Oxford, England and Bryanston School in Dorset. Later he trained at the Guildhall School of Music in London and the Juilliard Opera Center, where he won the Shoshana Foundation Award.

== Career ==
In the course of his career, Cazalet has appeared at almost all of the major operatic venues. His roles include Nicholas in Death and the Powers at the Monte Carlo Opera, Gerard in Les Enfants Terribles by Philip Glass’ at the Brooklyn Academy of Music Opera House, and Charles in The Music Programme at the Royal Opera House. His Lincoln Center concert debut was a performance of L'Infinito by Tristan Keuris. He has also performed with the New York Festival of Song at Weill Hall, at Carnegie Hall, and at the Wigmore Hall in London. He also performed as Mr Angel in The Impresario with the National Symphony Orchestra under Christopher Hogwood at the Kennedy Center. Other performances include Cascada in The Merry Widow with the English National Opera and Albert in Albert Herring with the Glyndebourne Touring Opera.

== Ancestry ==
Ancestors of Hal Cazalet

16. Edward Cazalet (1836–1883)
8. William Marshall Cazalet (1865–1932)
17. Elizabeth Sutherland Marshall (d. 1888)
4. Peter Victor Ferdinand Cazalet
18. Sir John Robert Heron Heron-Maxwell of Springkell, 7th Bt. (1836–1910)
9. Maud Lucia Heron-Maxwell (d. 1952)
19. Caroline Harriett Howard-Brooke (d. 1900)
2. Sir Edward Stephen Cazalet
20.
10. Joseph Arthur Rowley (d. 1910)
21.
5. Leonora Rowley (1905–1944)
22.
11. Ethel May Newton (1885–1984)
23.
1. Henry Pelham Cazalet
24. Hon. Henry Edward Hall Gage (1814–1875), son of Henry Gage, 4th Viscount Gage
12. Henry Gage, 5th Viscount Gage
25. Sophia Selina Knightley (d. 1886), daughter of Sir Charles Knightley, 2nd Bt. (1781–1864)
6. Henry Gage, 6th Viscount Gage
26. Rev. Frederick Peel (1833–1915)
13. Leila Georgina Peel (1865–1916)
27. Hon. Adelaide Frances Isabella Hanbury-Tracy (d. 1917), daughter of Thomas Hanbury-Tracy, 2nd Baron Sudeley
3. Hon. Camilla Jane Gage (b. 1937)
28. Charles William Grenfell
14. William Grenfell, 1st Baron Desborough
29. Georgiana Caroline Lascelles (1826–1911), daughter of William Lascelles
7. Lady Alexandra Imogen Clair Grenfell (1905–1969)
30. Hon. Julian Henry Charles Fane
15. Ethel Anne Priscilla Fane
31. Lady Adine Eliza Anne Cowper (1843–1868), daughter of George Cowper, 6th Earl Cowper
