= Lara Cazalet =

English actress

- Born: Lara Imogen Leonora Cazalet; 15 January 1971 (age 55); Westminster, London, England
- Occupation: Actress
- Years active: 1998–present
- Website: www.laracazalet.co.uk

Lara Imogen Leonora Cazalet (born 15 January 1971) is an English actress, known for portraying Zandra Plackett in Bad Girls and Annie Quick in New Street Law.

== Early life ==
Cazalet is the daughter of Sir Edward Cazalet, a retired High Court judge, and his wife, the Honourable Camilla Jane Gage, Lady Cazalet, daughter of Henry Gage, 6th Viscount Gage. Cazalet's paternal grandfather was Major Peter Cazalet, a racehorse-trainer, and her step great-grandfather was English writer, Sir P.G. Wodehouse.

She has two older brothers, David Benedict Cazalet and Henry Pelham Cazalet. Henry, known as Hal, is a composer and opera singer. In addition, Lara and Hal also sing together, professionally, in a jazz trio.

Cazalet attended Bryanston School in Bryanston, Dorset.

== Career ==
Cazalet's first major television role was that of Zandra Plackett in Bad Girls, a part she played for two years until the character died of a brain tumour. The episode where Zandra died was the highest ever rated episode of Bad Girls with 9,490,000 viewers. She later played the lead role of barrister Annie Quick in New Street Law. Cazalet has also made guest appearances in Hustle, Judge John Deed, Waking the Dead and Holby City. She has played four different characters in episodes of The Bill, including a corrupt NCS officer attempting to frame DI Manson for murder and corruption, and the wife of a toy shop manager who robs her husband's store.

Cazalet's film credits include EMR and Lady Godiva.

== Filmography ==
=== Film ===
Year	Film	Role	Notes
2004	EMR	Dr. McLean	
2007	Scarred	Celia	Short
2008	Lady Godiva	Esclairmonde	
2008	Framed	Hilary Glendinning	
2015	Legend	Mrs. Payne	

=== Television ===
Year	Film	Role	Notes
1998	Kavanagh QC	Nurse	"Bearing Witness"
1998	The Bill	Sammy Adams	"Soft in the Head"
1999	The Bill	Mandy Sharpe	"Sweet Sixteen"
1999	The Alchemists	Flight Attendant	TV film
1999–2000	Bad Girls	Zandra Plackett	Main role (series 1–2)
2000	Harbour Lights	Nikki	"A Quiet Storm"
2001	Always and Everyone	Lisa	"3.1"
2002	Where the Heart Is	Hildegaard Gruber	"Hold My Hand"
2002	As Time Goes By	Dave	"What Now?"
2002	Holby City	Angela Farrell	"Sinners and Saints"
2003	Waking the Dead	Fiona Mackenzie	"Multistorey: Parts 1 & 2"
2003	Judge John Deed	Diana Hulsey	"Health Hazard", "Economic Imperative"
2004	Rosemary & Thyme	Rosie Fitzcarron	"The Gongoozlers"
2005	Down to Earth	Louise Mottram	"Sisterly Feelings", "Cowboys"
2005	The Bill	DS Liz Garrett	"302: The Decoy - Parts 1 & 2"
2006	Hustle	Emily Shaw	"The Hustlers News of the Day"
2006	The Only Boy for Me	Kate	TV film
2006–07	New Street Law	Annie Quick	Main role
2007	Half-Broken Things	Sally	TV film
2009	Blue Murder	Yvonne Clarke	"Tooth and Claw"
2009	The Bill	Liv Till	"Smash and Grab: Parts 1 & 2"
2017	Fearless	Janice Long	"1.2"
