= Victor Cazalet =

British politician & aristocrat (1896–1943)

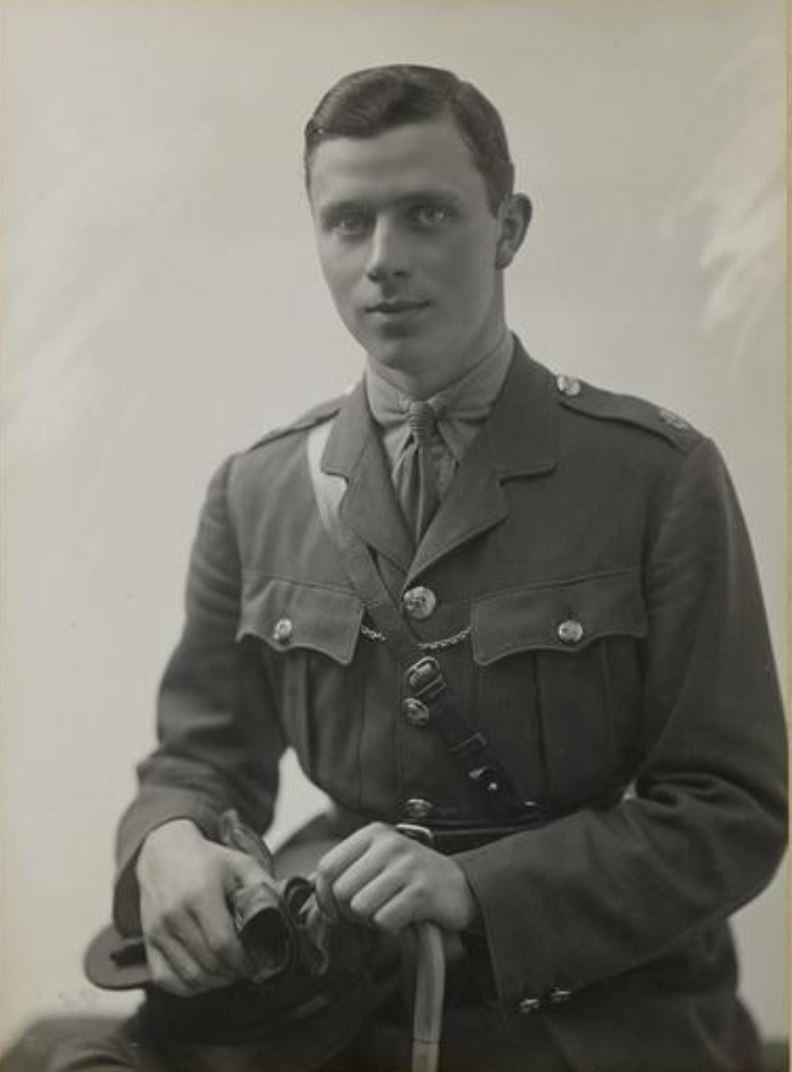
- Cazalet in the 1910s

Member of Parliament
- In office 1924–1943
- Constituency: Chippenham

Personal details
- Born: 27 December 1896 London
- Died: 4 July 1943 (aged 46) Mediterranean Sea, just off Gibraltar
- Cause of death: Plane crash
- Party: Conservative
- Parent(s): William Marshall Cazalet; Maud Cazalet
- Awards: Military Cross
- Sports career
Medal record
Men's squash
British Amateur Championships
Gold medal – first place	1925/1926	singles
Gold medal – first place	1927/1928	singles
Gold medal – first place	1929/1930	singles
Gold medal – first place	1930/1931	singles

Colonel Victor Alexander Cazalet, MC (27 December 1896 – 4 July 1943) was a British Conservative Party Member of Parliament for nineteen years. He came from a prominent, wealthy English family.

In his political career, he was a noted authority on international affairs and was a veteran of World War I. He became the liaison officer with Polish General Sikorski (Prime Minister of the Polish government-in-exile) after the outbreak of World War II. He promoted strong military ties with the United States before and during the war and was an outspoken advocate for creating a Jewish homeland in Palestine.

Cazalet was also an amateur athlete, squash champion and tennis player in Great Britain for many years. He became godfather to actress Elizabeth Taylor after developing a friendship with her family. Travelling back to London from Gibraltar, he was killed in the 1943 Gibraltar B-24 crash at age 46 along with General Sikorski and 15 others.

== Early life and education ==
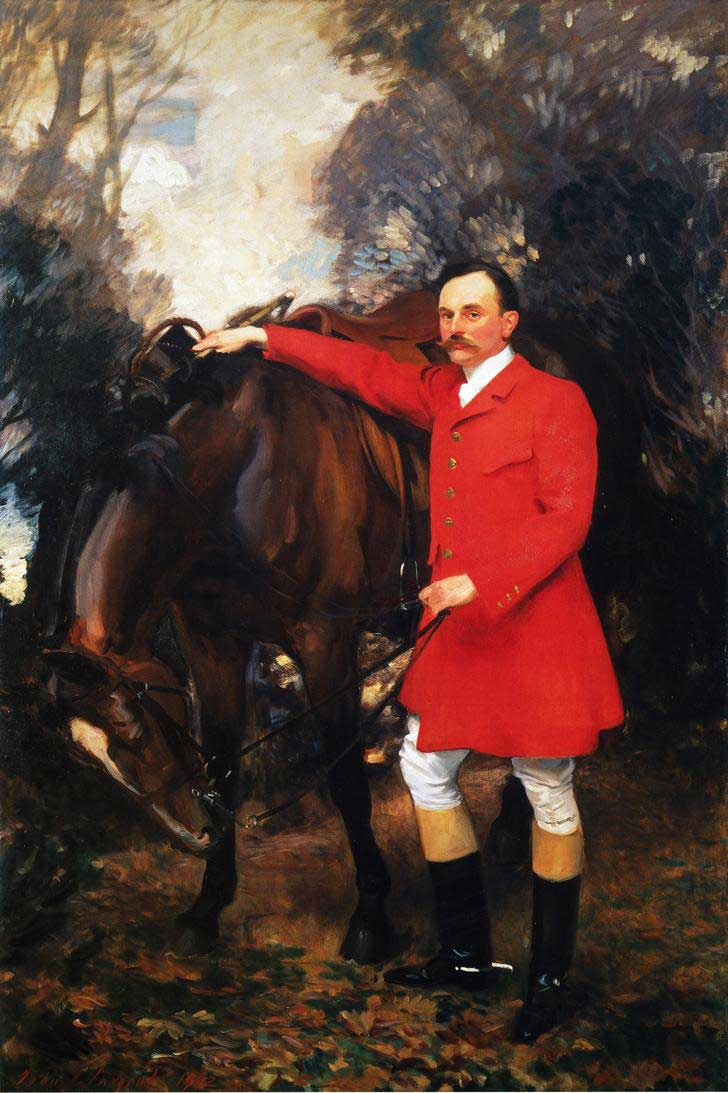
William Marshall Cazalet, John Singer Sargent, 1902

Victor Cazalet was born in London, at 4 Whitehall Gardens, on 12 December 1896, the second son of William Marshall Cazalet and his wife, Maud. Their country house, Fairlawne in Kent, had once been the residence of former Prime Minister Sir Robert Peel. The family also had a villa at Cimiez, France, where Queen Victoria was sometimes their guest; she also became Victor's godmother.

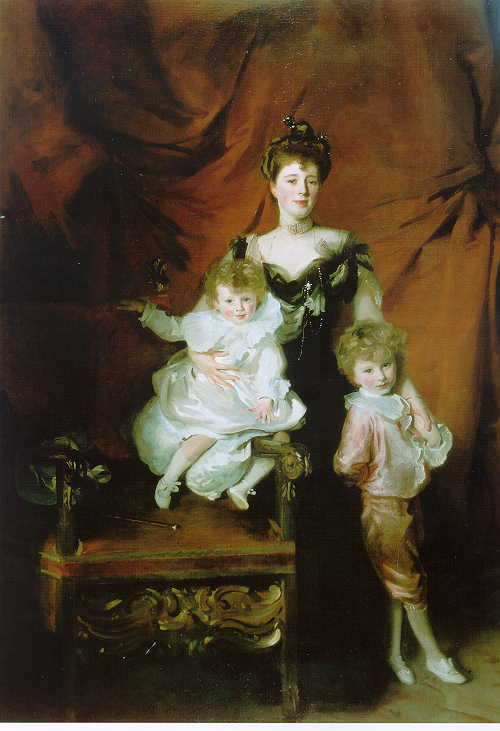
Cazalet's mother with sons Edward and Victor, painted by John Singer Sargent, 1900–1901, LACMA

The ancestors of the Cazalet family were Huguenots from Languedoc, in the south of France, who settled in England after the Revocation of the Edict of Nantes had forced them out of the country. Cazalet's father had achieved success in business and was heir to his own father's fortune as an industrialist with business activities in Russia. Cazalet's mother, Maud, was the daughter of a Scottish baronet, Sir John Heron-Maxwell of Springkell, who when he died had left his family penniless.

Cazalet had three siblings: Edward (1894–1916), Thelma (later Thelma Cazalet-Keir) and Peter. He was educated at Eton College, 1909–1915, and later at the University of Oxford.

== Military service and political career ==
He was commissioned into the Queen's Own West Kent Yeomanry in 1915 and reached the rank of Captain. He subsequently served in the front line with the Household Battalion of the 1st Life Guards, and received the Military Cross for gallantry in 1917. He served on the staff of the Allied Supreme War Council, whose conferences led up to the Treaty of Versailles, which ended the war. From 1918 to 1919 he was a member of the British military staff in the Siberian intervention.

After taking a degree in history at Oxford, Cazalet was first elected to Parliament at the 1924 general election, serving as a Conservative member for the Chippenham constituency in Wiltshire until his death in 1943. From 1924 to 1926 he acted as a parliamentary private secretary; later, he served under the President of the Board of Trade and later under the Colonial Secretary.

During the Spanish Civil War, Cazalet was a strong supporter of General Franco and the fascists, serving on the Friends of National Spain committee. However, at the Anschluss of Austria by Nazi Germany in March 1938, he opposed, with Winston Churchill, the appeasement of Adolf Hitler by Neville Chamberlain's government. He sent a statement of support to the inaugural national meeting of Moral Re-Armament, an anti-communist organisation, in the United States in June 1939.

Cazalet became the liaison officer with Polish General Władysław Sikorski, who served as Prime Minister of the Polish government-in-exile, in 1940. As a Member of Parliament, he was a member of the Anglo-Polish committee formed in 1941. He visited the Soviet Union with Sikorski in 1942. During the same period, he was made chairman of the House of Commons committee on refugee problems and was stationed at the British embassy in Washington.

=== Promoting military ties with the United States ===
Cazalet also termed himself "a booster for America" and had publicly expressed the gratitude of British subjects for the aid that America gave Britain before and after World War II began. In 1940 he wanted Britain to give the US a free port in the West Indies, with all sovereign rights so that the US Navy could have a port closer to South America. He also hoped that the US and British Navies would join after the war to "pool their policies and ideas".

He had expressed that opinion since the disputes at the 1927 Geneva Naval Conference and he continued during the revival of those efforts that led to the London Naval Treaty in 1930. He feared that a failure of Britain and the United States to reach an agreement, regardless of the other countries involved, would lead to a dangerous competition in shipbuilding between both countries that would seriously jeopardise world peace: In 1929 he said, "Each country should build the ships it needs without regarding the other navy as a possible enemy".

In 1941, during the London Blitz, Cazalet urged the American government to keep the lifeline between their countries open. "The victory can be won," he emphasised, "if the stuff gets over". He added that Britain was deeply grateful for the help it had already received from the US.

=== Advocating Jewish homeland ===
Cazalet had become chairman of the House of Commons Palestine Committee and described the plight of Britain under siege as connected to that of the Jews who were being driven from Europe by the Nazis. During a speech to the committee in May 1941, he explained that they had the same aims:

Both Jews and the British have one thing in common—a faith that their problems will be solved. And that faith has kindled in our hearts a flame no enemy will be able to extinguish. On the treatment of Jews, and of all small minorities, depends the future of mankind.

In Cazalet's opinion, it was in the best interest of the British Empire to establish a Jewish state in Palestine. However, although Jews were also victims of Nazi aggression, they were still not recognised as allies of Britain. "England," he said, "may have made many mistakes, but today she represents something above and beyond material possessions".

Although he never knew his grandfather, Edward Cazalet, the latter had first inspired his interest in establishing a Jewish state. An industrialist based in Russia, Edward had written a number of treatises in the 1870s in which he advocated a Jewish homeland and wrote that "under English protection the Jewish nation, after eighteen hundred years of exile, would have it in their power to return again to their own country". According to Cazalet biographer Robert Rhodes James, Edward Cazalet had seen the pogroms against the Jews in the Russian Empire, and their plight made a "profound emotional appeal to him". He also recognised the spiritual aspect:

Why is it that the English, more than any other nation in the world, are interested in the Jews and in their country? I think it is because the Bible is the History of the Jews, and the English and their descendants alone of all the nations of the world read and study the Bible.

Victor Cazalet's actual involvement in promoting the Jewish state began with the guidance of Lord Arthur Balfour, however, and Cazalet's friendship with Chaim Weizmann. Cazalet wrote, "Lord Balfour's devotion to the cause of Jewry will be recognised wherever Jews are to be found in this world". Weizmann tried to apply the feelings by championing the idea of creating a separate Jewish army that would support Britain's fight against Germany. In 1942, Cazalet called upon the British government to grant the Jewish Agency's request to create a fighting force of 20,000 Jewish soldiers and a home guard of 50,000 to be made an integral part of the British Army. His efforts failed, however.

Jew and Arab, by cooperation, will create a Middle East which may rival in prosperity the happiest days of their ancient glory.

— Victor Cazalet

At a 1941 conference in the United States in which he was joined by Sikorski, Cazalet advocated forgetting differences and "uniting all forces in an effort to defeat the enemy". He saw the struggle in Palestine as setting an example for the rest of the world. "Although the war has held up our program as far as Palestine is concerned, in God's good time the Jewish State will be established and it will contribute as much happiness and prosperity to the Arab as to the Jew." During a speech in April 1941, Cazalet stated:

Deliverance of the Jews from persecution is as important an issue as any for which we are fighting. The Jewish problem will never be solved anywhere until a national home in Palestine is established.... I believe that every unprejudiced Englishman could and should be grateful for the opportunity which his country has been given to fulfill the Scriptures and re-establish the Jewish State in the Holy Land.

On 27 June 1943, a week before he was killed, he visited Cairo and then Jerusalem, where he met with David Ben-Gurion and others. His last public statements recorded were at that meeting, in which he said, "I would gladly give my life for the establishment of a Jewish state in Palestine, as I am ready to give my life for the preservation of the British Empire.... Whatever happens, the Jews must have a permanent home."

== Death and legacy ==
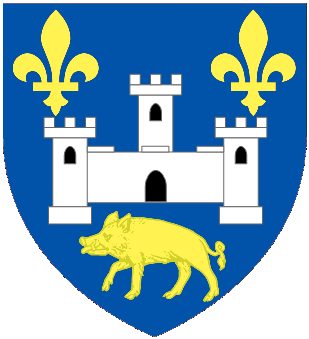
Shield displayed in the Commons chamber. Azure a castle triple towered Argent between two fleurs-de-lis in chief and a boar passant in base Or.

After serving in the House of Commons for nineteen years, he was considered one of the "most brilliant" of the younger men in the Commons. "His knowledge of central Europe was probably unequaled," wrote The New York Times after his sudden death in 1943, at age 46, when his plane crashed seconds after takeoff from Gibraltar.

The plane, a B-24 Liberator II LB-30 AL523 was also carrying General Sikorski and fellow Conservative MP Brigadier John Whiteley; Sikorski, Whiteley and everyone else on board (except for first pilot Eduard Prchal)—sixteen in all—died in the crash. The circumstances surrounding the unexplained accident have led to various controversies and allegations of sabotage.

Cazalet's family received a flood of tributes, many from unknown admirers and others from notables, including Churchill, Anthony Eden, Eleanor Rathbone, Hugh Dalton and Polish dignitaries. Chaim Weizmann speaking at a memorial ceremony in London, described Cazalet as "one of the few precious friends of the Jewish people in modern times who never was moved from his devotion to the (Zionist) cause." He said that his grave at Gibraltar would become a place of pilgrimage for the Jewish people, while Hadassah, the Women's Zionist Organization of America, agreed to plant 1,000 trees in Palestine to be named the "Victor Cazalet Grove." A lead article in the New York Herald Tribune read:

There can be few other Englishmen of our time who have touched so many nations and so many individual citizens upon terms of understanding and friendship. What he did for Poland he literally did around the world. Here in America his friends were countless ... it was as an understanding observer and appreciative visitor that Americans held him in affection and will remember him. To that post-war world, which must lean heavily upon men of goodwill if peace and justice are to prevail, Victor Cazalet is a heavy loss.

== Personal life ==
Cazalet, who was homosexual, was a member of the social circle of gay politicians derisively called the "Glamour Boys" by Neville Chamberlain. Cazalet was a Christian Scientist and a member of Ninth Church of Christ, Scientist, London. He was a landowner and a wealthy bachelor, whose numerous social and political connections included close friendships with Winston Churchill and Anthony Eden. He also won the British Amateur Squash Championships in 1925, 1927, 1929 and 1930 and played as a member of the English squash team when it won the international trophy after competing against Canada and the United States in 1927. He also played tennis competitively, including seven appearances at Wimbledon between 1922 and 1933.

In 1936, Cazalet purchased the 400-acre Great Swifts estate near Cranbrook, Kent, demolishing the old house and building a new one in Georgian style, designed by architect Geddes Hyslop.

Cazalet's sister, Thelma Cazalet-Keir, was a noted feminist and also a Conservative MP. She married journalist David Keir in August 1939. Cazalet's brother, Peter, who married P. G. Wodehouse's stepdaughter, Leonora, was a notable racehorse trainer who was British jump racing Champion Trainer three times and trained Queen Elizabeth The Queen Mother's racehorses.

=== Godfather to Mary Churchill ===
Cazalet was godfather to Winston and Clementine Churchill's youngest daughter, Mary, born in 1922. He tried unsuccessfully to persuade her mother to name her Victoria.

=== Godfather to Elizabeth Taylor ===
Cazalet, who had a passion for fine art, became a close friend of American art gallery owners Francis Taylor and his wife Sara, parents of Elizabeth, after they had moved from the U.S. to London in 1936. Cazalet let the Taylor family, who were also Christian Scientists, spend their weekends in a 16th-century cottage on his Great Swifts estate. He wanted them to think of England as their new home.

He gave 4-year-old Elizabeth a horse named Betty as a gift, which she would ride bareback throughout the property. The Taylors asked him to be her godfather, after which he became an important influence during her early life. At one time while Elizabeth suffered the first of many near-fatal illnesses, Elizabeth begged her mother to "please call Victor and ask him to come and sit with me." Cazalet then drove ninety miles through thick fog to be at her side. When he arrived, recalled her mother, "Victor sat on the bed and held Elizabeth in his arms and talked to her about God," and soon after the fever had broken.

After a lunch with Churchill in April 1939, Cazalet believed that a war was coming and, concerned for the Taylor family's safety, urged Francis to close his art gallery as soon as possible and return with his family to America. Because of the time needed to vacate the gallery, he suggested that Sara and his children should be sent back alone where Francis could later join them. They took his advice and eventually ended up in Los Angeles where he established a new gallery.

As Cazalet was an acquaintance of Hollywood columnist Hedda Hopper, he sent a letter of introduction on behalf of Elizabeth to Hopper, to help 7-year-old Elizabeth become involved in acting. Hopper met with Elizabeth and Sara and offered to help. Months later, Cazalet wrote in his diary for 16 April 1941, "Imagine excitement of Taylors. Elizabeth has a contract for seven years with a big cinema group."

== Other reading ==
- James, Robert Rhodes (1976). Victor Cazalet: a portrait. London: Hamilton. ISBN 0-241-89405-0.

== Notes ==
Parliament of the United Kingdom
Preceded by Alfred James Bonwick	Member of Parliament for Chippenham; 1924 – 1943	Succeeded by David Eccles
