= William Marshall Cazalet =

British tennis player (1865–1932)

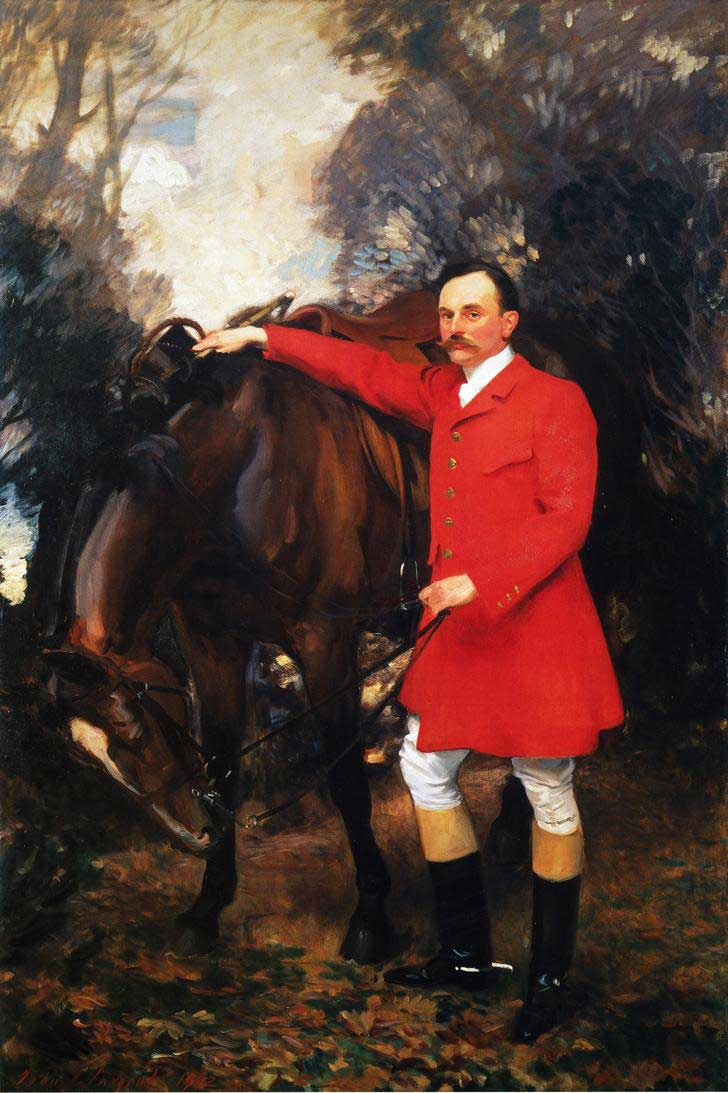
- William Marshall Cazalet, John Singer Sargent, 1902
- Born: 8 July 1865; St. Petersburg, Russia
- Died: 22 October 1932 (aged 67); Tonbridge, Kent, England
- Education: Christ Church, Oxford
- Occupation: Socialite
- Known for: represented Great Britain at the 1908 Olympic Games in jeu de paume
- Spouse: Maud Lucia Heron-Maxwell
- Children: 4, including Victor Cazalet, Thelma Cazalet-Keir, and Peter Cazalet
- Parent(s): Edward Cazalet; Elizabeth Sutherland Marshall
- Relatives: Sir John Robert Heron Heron-Maxwell, 7th Baronet (father-in-law)

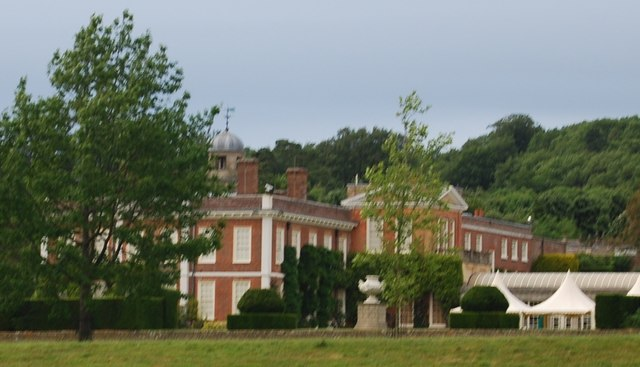
Fairlawne, where Cazalet grew up and lived as an adult

William Marshall Cazalet DL JP (8 July 1865 – 22 October 1932) was a wealthy British landowner who represented Great Britain at the 1908 Olympic Games in jeu de paume (real tennis).

== Early life ==
Cazalet was born in Saint Petersburg, Russia, on 8 July 1865. He was the son of Edward Cazalet, merchant and industrialist, and his wife, Elizabeth Sutherland Marshall (died 1888), daughter and heir of William Marshall, doctor and Danish consul in Edinburgh. Cazalet graduated from Christ Church, Oxford, in 1889. At Oxford, he won a Blue in real tennis (jeu de paume) in 1886, 1887 and 1889, and won the singles in 1889. His father had a real tennis court built for him at Fairlawne, the family home in Shipbourne, Kent.

== Career ==
Cazalet was a wealthy landowner, with friends including Rudyard Kipling. He served as a Lieutenant in the West Kent Yeomanry Cavalry, and held appointments by the Crown as High Sheriff of Kent, a Justice of the Peace and Deputy Lieutenant of Kent.

Cazalet represented Great Britain at the 1908 Olympic Games in jeu de paume.

Cazalet was painted by John Singer Sargent in 1902, with his horse and wearing a hunting jacket. The painting was sold at Christie's, New York in May 2007, with an estimate of US$2–3 million, and realised $1.832 million. In 2015, Barbra Streisand donated Sargent's 1900–01 group portrait of his wife and two children, Mrs. Cazalet and Children Edward and Victor, to the Los Angeles County Museum of Art.

== Personal life ==
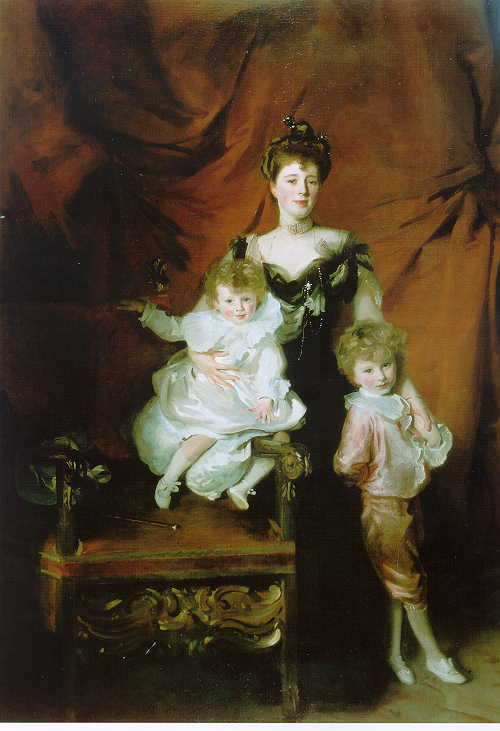
Mrs. Cazalet with Edward and Victor Cazalet, by John Singer Sargent, 1900–01

He married Maud Lucia Heron-Maxwell (known as Molly; died 1952), daughter of Sir John Robert Heron Heron-Maxwell, 7th Baronet.

Cazalet's eldest son Edward, born 1894, was killed in action in France in 1916. His second son, Victor Cazalet, and his daughter Thelma Cazalet-Keir, both became Members of Parliament, and his third son was the racehorse trainer Peter Cazalet.

Cazalet died on 22 October 1932 in Tonbridge, Kent, England.
