= Hollams =

Hollams is a surname. Notable people with the surname include:

- F. M. Hollams (1877–1963), British painter
- John Hollams (1820–1910), English solicitor
