= Edward Cazalet (merchant) =

British merchant and industrialist (1827-1883)

- Born: 9 November 1827; Brighton, Sussex, England
- Died: 21 April 1883 (aged 55); Constantinople, Ottoman Empire
- Occupations: Merchant and industrialist
- Spouse: Elizabeth Sutherland Marshall
- Children: William Marshall Cazalet
- Parent(s): Peter Clement Cazalet; Olympia Cazalet

Edward Cazalet (9 November 1827 – 21 April 1883), was a British merchant and industrialist.

Cazalet was born in Brighton on 9 November 1827, the youngest of seven children of Peter Clement Cazalet (1785–1859), merchant and Russian consul, and his wife, Olympia Cazalet (d. 1848). The family descended from Huguenots who fled France after the Revocation of the Edict of Nantes.

On 15 March 1860, Cazalet married Elizabeth Sutherland Marshall (d. 1888), daughter and heir of William Marshall, doctor and Danish consul in Edinburgh. Their only child was William Marshall Cazalet, born 1865. In 1872, Cazalet purchased the estate of Fairlawne at Shipbourne in Kent; he also owned Villa Liserb at Cimiez in the south of France, which was often visited by Queen Victoria, who became godmother to his grandson, Victor Cazalet, born 1896.

Cazalet died of typhus at the Hôtel d'Angleterre, Constantinople, on 21 April 1883, and was survived by his wife. He was buried at St Giles's Church, Shipbourne, on 7 May 1883.

He was also the author of England's Policy in the East: Our Relations with Russia and the Future of Syria (London: Edward Stanford, 1879).
