= Dene Park =

Country house in Kent, England

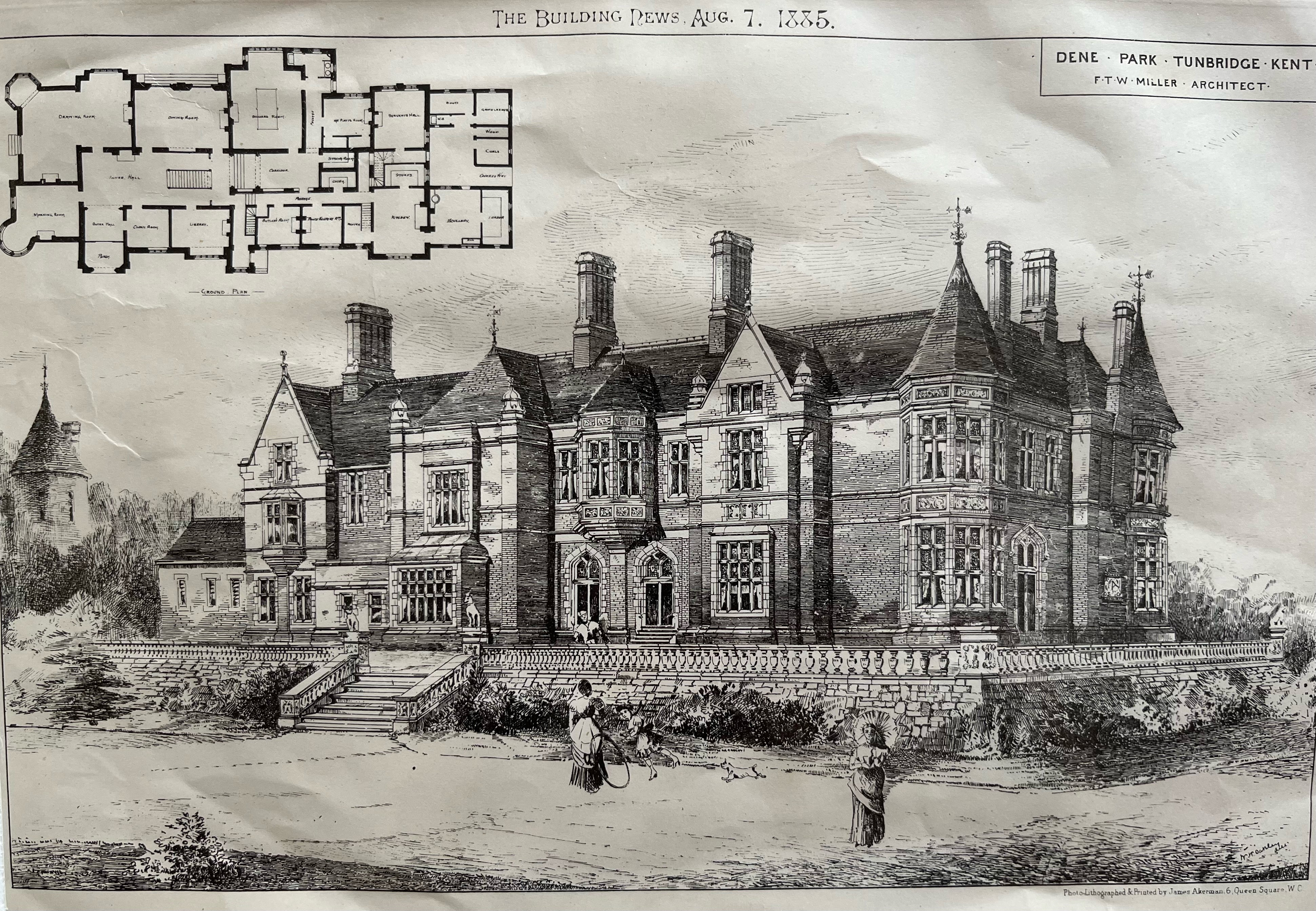
- Dene Park, Hadlow, Kent
- Interactive map of the Dene Park area

General information
- Status: Private residences
- Location: Hadlow, Kent, United Kingdom
- Coordinates: TQ 597 503
- Completed: 1883

Design and construction
- Architect: F. T. W. Miller
- Known for: Former use by the Thomas Delarue School (1955–63)

Dene Park is a Victorian mansion house and estate in the parish of Hadlow, Kent, United Kingdom. It served as the site of the Thomas Delarue School between 1955 and 1965.

== History ==
The Dene Park estate was advertised for sale in The Times of 13 July 1878 as being for sale. The house was described as having fifteen bedrooms and set in 682 acres (276 ha) of land. There was stabling for five horses which included accommodation for a groom. A six bedroom shooting house was included in the sale, as was a farm and several cottages. The house was extensively altered in the next five years.

Built in 1883 Dene Park was designed by the architect F.T.W Miller, Dene Park was designed primarily as a sporting estate and occupied 620 acres in total. Built of red brick with bath stone dressings, the gardens were designed by the landscape gardener Edward Milner of which much of his original design work still remains. To the right of the property the iconic round smokery remains hinting at the property's sporting heritage.

Owned by Sir John Hollams until his death in on May 3, 1910, it was then inherited by his second eldest son Frederick Willams Hollams (b. 1848) who lived there for the next thirty one years. Also residing in the home were Frederick's wife, Mary Owen Hollams, daughter of the architect Sir Charles Lanyon, and their daughter, the artist Frances Mabel Hollams. In 1917, Frederick Williams Hollams was appointed High Sheriff of Kent. He died on 21 November 1941 aged 93.

The contents of Dene Park were sold by auction on 20 January 1942. During the Second World War Dene Park became the training school for the 44th (Home Counties) Division and 53rd Division. Jack Rose, a Hurricane pilot flying Hurricanes from West Malling Airfield worked with the instructors to make training as realistic as possible; the school's instructors would carry out exercises on Shipbourne Green with aircraft flying in fours would carry out low-level navigation exercises culminating on an attack on the Battle School troops. Camera Guns were used and the resulting films passed to instructors and troops to estimate what casualties would have been suffered and how to improve tactics.

In 1955 the house became the Thomas Delarue School, a specialist co-educational boarding school founded by the National Spastics Society to serve children with cerebral palsy. In 1963 the school moved to a purpose built site near Tonbridge.

The house was converted into nine flats in 1991, with the woods now managed by the Forestry Commission, and the original coach house is now occupied by Greensands Ridge gin distillery. The house retains many features from the time of its construction, including the original chapel ceilings, the terrace, and a fireplace dated 1591 and reputedly brought from Haddon Hall, Derbyshire. (Note: The fireplace is inscribed with the name Godfridus Ffoljambe as well as the 1591 date. John Newman attributes it to “one of the Ffoljambe seats in Derbyshire or Nottinghamshire.") John Newman, in Kent: West and The Weald, his 2012 revised volume in the Pevsner Buildings of England series, describes Dene Park as a "substantial mansion in a Waterhousian Tudor Gothic" style.

== Notable residents ==
- F.M Hollams
- Henry Cooper
- Ernie Burrington
- George Wills
