= Shipbourne =

Village in England

Coordinates: 51.24937°N 0.28402°E

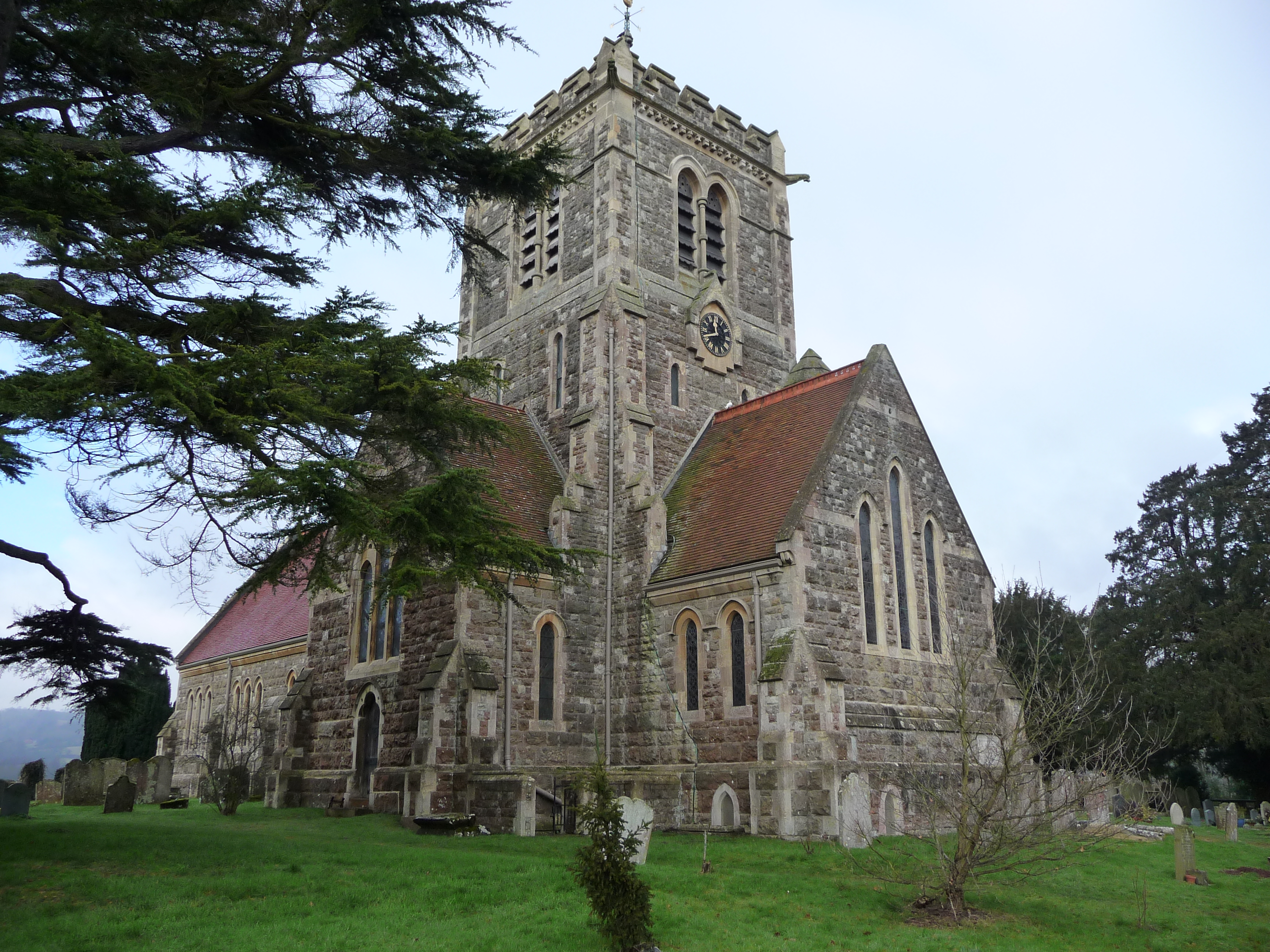
- St Giles' Church, Shipbourne

- Location within Kent
- Population: 470 (2011 Census)
- OS grid reference: TQ595525
- District: Tonbridge and Malling
- Shire county: Kent
- Region: South East
- Country: England
- Sovereign state: United Kingdom
- Post town: Tonbridge
- Postcode district: TN11
- Police: Kent
- Fire: Kent
- Ambulance: South East Coast
- UK Parliament: Tonbridge

Shipbourne (/ˈʃɪbərn/ SHIB-ərn) is a village and civil parish situated between the towns of Sevenoaks and Tonbridge, in the borough of Tonbridge and Malling in the English county of Kent. In 2020 it was named as the most expensive village in Kent.

It is located in an undulating landscape traversed by the small streams of the River Bourne, set in a clay vale at the foot of the wooded Sevenoaks Greensand Ridge. The landscape is agricultural with dispersed groups of buildings that are almost entirely residential or used for farming purposes.

The dominant characteristics of the historical landscape are thick woodland with smaller, broadleaf coppices with small to medium-sized fields enclosed by traditional boundaries of hedges or chestnut fencing. Earlier removal of some hedgerows has resulted in some larger arable fields; these are often separated by small woodland belts or shaws. The most distinctive landscape feature is The Common, also known as The Green, which is a large, open and dominant space in the centre of the village.

To the south of the village, on each side of the A227 is Hoad Common. Before the last war Hoad Common was an attractive lightly treed open space popular with visitors but is now neglected and is rapidly deteriorating into scrubby woodland.

The parish is situated in the Metropolitan Green Belt and is an area designated as a Special Landscape Area. The central village, including the pub, the church, the village school and The Common, is within a Conservation Area. Much of the village lies within the Kent Downs Area of Outstanding Natural Beauty.

== The Fairlawne Estate ==
The Fairlawne Estate is a 1,000 acre landed-estate which stretches from Shipbourne into neighbouring Plaxtol. It was formerly owned by the Saudi Arabian horse-breeder, Prince Khalid Abdullah.

Vane Family: In Stuart times, the estate was the property of Sir Henry Vane the Elder, Secretary of State to Charles I. Sir Henry was created Lord-Lieutenant of Durham and the family later became one of the leading families in that county too. Sir Henry's eldest son, Sir Henry Vane the Younger, became Governor of Massachusetts in 1635. During the English Civil War he was a leading Parliamentarian and, after the Restoration, was executed for high treason in 1662. His body lies in the Vane family vault area of the crypt of Shipbourne church in an anthropoid (body shaped) lead shell coffin with many members of the Vane family. His ghost is said to wander the village.

The poet Christopher Smart was born in 1722 at Fairlawne, where his father was steward, wrote a 700 verse blank poem about hop-growing.

Cazalet Family: The Vane family were followed by the Cazalets. In 1880, Edward Cazalet built the church, dedicated to St Giles, plus a public house, originally named "The New Inn" and later renamed The Chaser, and several of the cottages which surround The Common. Major Peter Cazalet was the trainer of horses owned by Queen Elizabeth the Queen Mother. Many members of the Cazalet family are commemorated in the church.

== The Village ==
St Giles’ Church: Originally the regarded as a chapel to Tonbridge Parish Church by 1314 the Church belonged to the Knights Hospitallers of St John of Jerusalem. The dedication of the church to St Giles, the patron saint of lepers, beggars and disabled people dates from this period. Jane Austen's father, George Austen held the curacy of St Giles church until 1758. The current church building was commissioned by Edward Cazalet in 1879 to replace a crumbling older building dating from 1722. The new church was built by a local builder, William Allcorn, who used pinnacles from the old church as gateposts for his new house on School Lane.

St Giles' Church continues to serve as a place of worship, but nowadays also doubles up, every Thursday morning, as the venue for the local farmers' market.

Dene Park: Dene Park woods is 250 acres of mixed woodland stretching from Shipbourne Common towards Tonbridge. Now looked after by the forestry commission, it originally formed part of the 650 acre Dene Park Estate; a sporting estate and country house on the outskirts of the village. The equestrian and canine artist F.M. Hollams spent her early years at Dene Park.

Shipbourne Cricket Club: Established in 1880, Shipbourne CC is one of the oldest village cricket clubs in the county. Originally playing on Shipbourne Common, in 1939 the Common was turned over to Agricultural use by the Kent War Agricultural Committee; despite the village warning that nothing would grow on the Common an attempt to grow corn was made. Whilst nothing grew the land was ruined for cricket.

Following the end of the Second World War, Peter Cazalet asked his gallops manager and Shipbourne Cricket Captain Joe Hills to identify a new home for the Club. Joe identified a field behind St. Giles church at the bottom of Fairlawne Hill where the club play to this day. Shipbourne have 2 Saturday league sides and a friendly XI on Sundays.

Shipbourne Village Hall: Built in 1879, Shipbourne Village hall forms part of a cottage at the end of the Common and was gifted to the village by the Cazalet family.

The Wood House: A Grade II listed house, commissioned by Jack and Frankie Donaldson and built on land found for them by Peter Cazalet on the edge of Shipbourne Common. The house was built by the Bauhaus founder Walter Gropius. Thought to be Gropius' last work in the UK and the only weather-board one; the Wood House was initially mocked by villagers and known as "The Chicken House", but over the years it has become a local landmark

== See also ==
- Listed buildings in Shipbourne
