= Peter Cazalet (racehorse trainer) =

English cricketer, jockey, racehorse owner and trainer (1907–1973)

Peter Cazalet DL
- Born: 15 January 1907; Fairlawne, Shipbourne, Kent
- Died: 29 May 1973 (aged 66); Fairlawne, Shipbourne, Kent
- Resting place: St Giles' Church, Shipbourne
- Education: Eton College; Christ Church, Oxford
- Occupations: Cricketer, jockey, racehorse trainer
- Spouse(s): Leonora Wodehouse (m. 1932; died 1944) Zara Strutt (m. 1949)
- Father: William Marshall Cazalet
- Relatives: Victor Cazalet (brother); Thelma Cazalet (sister); Edward Cazalet (son)
- Horse racing career
- Sport: Horse racing

Significant horses
- Devon Loch; Dunkirk; Manicou; Monaveen
- Military career
- Allegiance: United Kingdom
- Branch: British Army
- Service years: 1939-45
- Rank: Major
- Units: Royal Artillery (1939); Welsh Guards (1939–41); Guards Armoured Division (1941–45)
- Conflicts: World War II; Operation Goodwood; Operation Bluecoat

Peter Victor Ferdinand Cazalet DL (15 January 1907 – 29 May 1973) was a British cricketer, jockey, racehorse owner and trainer from Shipbourne, Kent. He played first-class cricket for Kent County Cricket Club and the Marylebone Cricket Club. He served in the Guards Armoured Division during the Second World War, reaching the rank of Major. Post-war, he trained many horses owned by Queen Elizabeth the Queen Mother and other notable owners. He was British jump racing Champion Trainer on three occasions.

== Personal life ==
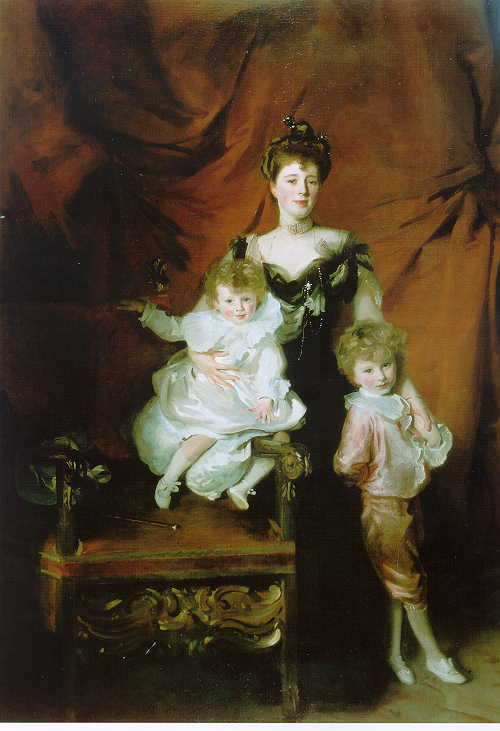
Mrs. Cazalet and Children Edward and Victor, John Singer Sargent, 1900–1901

Peter Victor Ferdinand Cazalet was born at Fairlawne, Shipbourne, Kent on 15 January 1907. He was the third son and youngest child of William Marshall Cazalet and Maud Cazalet. The Cazalet family descended from French Huguenots. His brothers were Edward and Victor; his sister was Thelma. Edward was killed in action in 1916.; Victor was killed in a plane crash in 1943. He was educated at Eton and Christ Church, Oxford. Cazalet was good at racquet sports and cricket, playing lawn tennis and rackets.

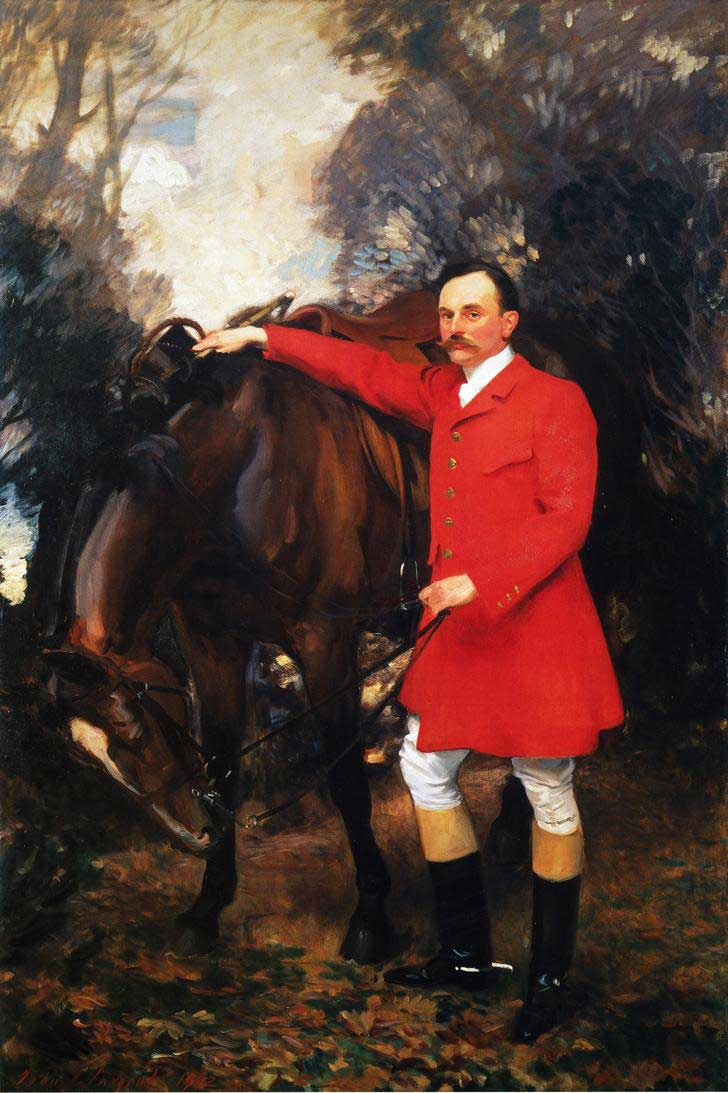
William Marshall Cazalet, John Singer Sargent, 1902

Cazalet's father died on 22 October 1932. Shortly afterwards, it was announced that Peter would marry Leonora Wodehouse, the step-daughter of P. G. Wodehouse. They were married at St Giles' Church, Shipbourne, on 14 December 1932. His brother Victor was the best man. Wodehouse was delighted at the match and wrote "You know me on the subject of Peter: Thumbs up, old boy. Not only a sound egg, but probably the only sound egg left in this beastly era of young Bloomsbury novelists...You are bound to be happy."

Cazalet and Leonora had a son, Edward, and a daughter, Sheran. Edward in later life became a high court judge; Sheran married Sir Simon Hornby in 1967.

Leonora died in London on 16 May 1944 during a routine operation. Cazalet was given a few days leave from the army to attend her funeral. Leonora was cremated and her ashes were scattered at Fairlawne. A window in St Giles' Church is dedicated to her.

In 1949, Cazalet married Zara Strutt, the former wife of Lord Belper, and daughter of Sir Harry Mainwaring, 5th Baronet. They had three sons, although one, David, died in infancy. He is commemorated by a silver cross in St Giles' Church. In 1957, Cazalet was nominated for the position of High Sheriff of Kent, a position to which he was appointed in 1960. Zara Cazalet died in 2004 at the age of 87.

== Cricket ==
Peter Cazalet
Cricket information
- Batting: Right-handed
- Role: Batsman

Domestic team information
- Years: Team
- 1927–1928: Oxford University
- 1927–1932: Kent
- 1928: MCC
- FC debut: 18 May 1927 Oxford Univ. v Leicestershire
- Last FC: 11 June 1932 Kent v Yorkshire

Career statistics
Competition	First-class
Matches	22
Runs scored	744
Batting average	21.88
100s/50s	1/4
Top score	150
Catches/stumpings	6/–
- Source: CricInfo, 9 October 2018

As a cricketer, Cazalet was a right-handed batsman, sometimes playing as an opener. He played for Eton and scored a century in the Eton v Harrow cricket match at Lord's in July 1926. Wisden, in its 1927 review of public school cricket, wrote that he had been "at once the most successful and the best" of the school's batsmen: "He has the quickness of foot and the nicety of timing that one expects in a good racquets player, but his defence was also good and he was clever at forcing the ball to the on." In 1926 he played one Second XI match for Kent and in September 1927 played at The Oval in a match between the Young Amateurs of Kent versus the Young Amateurs of Surrey, scoring 117 runs.

Whilst at Oxford, Cazalet played first-class cricket regularly during 1927 for the Oxford University team. Against Surrey he shared in a first-wicket partnership of 207 with Aidan Crawley, although he contributed only 66 runs, Crawley making 150. The following week against Essex his innings was cited by Wisden as the brightest part of a disappointing batting performance by the university. Following these innings he was awarded his Blue for cricket and appeared in the University Match against Cambridge.

In a preview of the 1928 season in The Times, Cazalet was expected to be one of the mainstays of university batting line-up. In a move that was not uncommon at the time, as an established Oxford player he was "stood down" from the early-season match against Kent County Cricket Club, appearing instead for the county team. He responded by scoring 150, sharing a partnership of 204 with Frank Woolley. The Times commented that Cazalet was not even overshadowed by Woolley, one of Kent's greatest players. Cazalet returned to the Oxford team for most of the rest of the university season, but was not successful, and before the end of June he had lost his place in the team and was not picked for the 1928 University Match.

Cazalet did not play any first-class cricket between 1929 and 1931, but reappeared in two matches for Kent in 1932 without making much impact. In all, Cazalet played in 22 first-class matches from 1927 to 1932, scoring 744 runs at an average of 21.88 runs per innings.

As well as gaining a cricket blue at Oxford, Cazalet also won blues in racquets, tennis and squash. He was considered a "fine all-round sportsman" in his Wisden obituary.

== Pre-war racing career ==
Cazalet started his career as a jockey in point-to-point racing. He came second on Beau Geste at the North Cotswold Hunt in April 1929. In 1930, he moved up to National Hunt racing. He rode Rocquefort II at Haydock Park in December of that year. At this time, Cazalet was building a stable of steeplechasers at Fairlawne. They were trained by Harry Whiteman. Cazalet gave Elizabeth Taylor instruction in horse-riding when she was a girl.

Cazalet rode in the Grand National five times in succession between 1933 and 1937. His only finish came at his first attempt on the 1930 winner Shaun Goilin, completing the Aintree course in a distant 16th. He rode Master Orange in 1934, and Emancipator three times in succession, in 1935, 1936 and 1937.

In November 1937, Cazalet announced he would retire from riding as an amateur jockey due to pressures of his business interests. He remained an owner, with Whiteman continuing to train his horses. One of Cazalet's final runners before war broke out was at Folkestone, where French Beggar came third on 4 May 1939.

== Wartime career ==
Following the outbreak of war in 1939, Cazalet joined the Royal Artillery. He transferred to the Welsh Guards, along with his friend Anthony Mildmay. In 1941, the Guards Armoured Division was formed under the command of Sir Oliver Leese and Cazalet was transferred to the new unit. The Armoured Guards landed at Arromanches, Manche, France on 25 June 1944 and served as a reconnaissance unit during the push across Europe before the German surrender in May 1945. In February 1945, it was reported that Cazalet had been wounded in action. Both Cazalet and Mildmay were involved in an action at Visselhövede, Lower Saxony, Germany on the night of 18–19 April 1945 in which they were attacked by German Marines. The Guards Armoured Division was disbanded at Rotenburg an der Wümme, Lower Saxony on 9 June 1945.

== Post-war career ==
Cazalet started his career as a racehorse trainer in November 1945. He paid 4,000 guineas for the five-year-old gelding Fisherman's Yarn at Newmarket. Another of his early horses was The Hood, who was entered for a novice hurdle race at Windsor in March 1946. In the 1946–47 season, he had 40 winners, 32 of them ridden by Mildmay.

In 1949, Cazalet and Mildmay stayed at Windsor Castle as guests of Her Majesty Queen Elizabeth. It was during their stay that they persuaded the Queen to buy a steeplechaser, which Cazalet would train. An early success was Manicou, who won the King George VI Chase at Kempton Park Racecourse in 1950. Another of the Queen's horses trained by Cazalet was Monaveen, jointly owned with Princess Elizabeth. Following Mildmay's death in May 1950, Cazalet inherited the horses owned by Mildmay and £10,000.

Cazalet also trained the Queen Mother's^{[Note 1]} Devon Loch, who fell on the run-in to the finish line at the 1956 Grand National when 50 yards (46 m) clear of E.S.B., who won. Devon Loch subsequently failed to finish. His jockey was Dick Francis, who had been designated as Cazalet's first jockey in 1953. He trained over 250 winners for the Queen Mother and was champion trainer three times. Cazalet's personal chef for eight years was Albert Roux.

Cazalet trained Antiar, who won the Ovaltine Hurdle at Fontwell Park Racecourse on 22 December 1962, the last day of racing before The Big Freeze set in. When racing resumed in March 1963, Cazalet had two winners at Newbury on 8 March and four the next day. In the 1964–65 season, Cazalet had a record 82 winners. By 1967, he had had his one thousandth winner. His final runner was Soundless at Doncaster on 24 March 1973.

== Death ==
Cazalet died at Fairlawne on 29 May 1973. He was buried at St. Giles' Church; four of his jockeys carried his coffin. A memorial service was held at the Guards Chapel, Wellington Barracks, London on 15 June. Following his death, Fulke Walwyn was appointed trainer to the Queen Mother.

Fairlawne was inherited by Edward Cazalet. He was unable to continue the racing stable due to his career as a barrister, and later a High Court judge. In 1979, Fairlawne was sold to racehorse owner Khalid Abdullah.

== Ancestry ==
Ancestors of Peter Cazalet (racehorse trainer)

16. Noah Cazalet (1757–1800), brother of #18
8. Peter Clement Cazalet (1785–1859)
17. Charlotte Moore (d. 1787)
4. Edward Cazalet (1836–1883)
18. Peter Cazalet (1756–1811), brother of #16
9. Olympia Cazalet (1788–1848)
19. Sarah Haughton-Langston (d. 1842)
2. William Marshall Cazalet (1865–1932)
10. William Marshall, Danish Consul-General for Scotland
5. Elizabeth Sutherland Newhall Marshall (d. 1888)
22. James Miller (1775–1855)
11. Elizabeth Miller (d. 1888)
23. Elizabeth Sutherland (1773–1862)
1. Peter Victor Ferdinand Cazalet
24. Sir John Heron-Maxwell, 4th Baronet
12. Capt. Sir John Heron-Maxwell, 6th Bt (1808–1885)
25. Mary Heron (d. 1856), daughter of Patrick Heron, granddaughter of Thomas Cochrane, 8th Earl of Dundonald
6. Sir John Robert Heron-Maxwell, 7th Bt (1836–1910)
26. Hon. Montgomery Granville John Stewart (1780–1860), son of John Stewart, 7th Earl of Galloway
13. Caroline Stewart (d. 1896)
27. Catherine Honyman (d. 1833)
3. Maud Lucia Heron-Maxwell (1867–1952)
28. Sir Henry Brooke, 1st Bt (1770–1834)
14. Richard Brooke (d. 1877)
29. Harriet Butler
7. Caroline Harriett Howard-Brooke (d. 1900)
30. Hans Hamilton
15. Frances Caroline Hamilton (d. 1876)
31. Anne Mitchell (1778–?)

== See also ==
- Anthony Mildmay, Peter Cazalet Memorial Chase
- Fairlawne Chase
- Fairlawne Handicap Chase

== Notes ==
1. Queen Elizabeth took the title Queen Elizabeth the Queen Mother on the death of her husband King George VI and accession to the throne of her daughter Queen Elizabeth II.
