= Disability Now =

British disability magazine

- Logo for Disability Now
- Editor: Ian Macrae
- Frequency: Monthly
- Circulation: 18,514 (2008)
- Founded: 1984
- Final issue: September 2012
- Country: United Kingdom
- Language: English
- Website: www.disabilitynow.org.uk
- ISSN: 0958-4676

Disability Now was a UK magazine for disabled people, published by UK disability charity Scope(previously known as the National Spastics Society).

It was first published in 1984 as a newspaper and continued in that form until 2008, when it was redesigned as an A4 magazine with a greater emphasis on lifestyle features than previously. During this time, Ian Macare became the first disabled person to edit a British disability-focused publication. In 2012 it moved to an online only format, with the last print edition in September 2012.

In December 2016, Scope announced the closure of the then-online only publication but would "continue publishing DN-branded content on its own website".
