= Thomas Delarue School =

Coordinates: 51°13′32″N 0°17′21″E

Thomas Delarue

Location
- Starvecrow Hill; Tonbridge, Kent, TN11 9NP; United Kingdom

Information
- Type: Special Secondary Boarding School
- Motto: There is no failure other than ceasing to try
- Opened: 1955
- Closed: 1989
- Local authority: Kent County Council
- Specialist: Children with cerebral palsy
- Age: 11 to 16
- Enrollment: 87 (1966)

Thomas Delarue was a co-educational special secondary boarding school in Tonbridge, Kent, England that was established in 1955 and closed in 1989. It was run by The Spastics Society and catered for pupils with cerebral palsy.

== History ==
Thomas Delarue School was established by The National Spastics Society in Tonbridge, Kent in 1955. It initially occupied Dene Park House, a converted mansion house and World War 2 battle school in Hadlow parish (TQ 597 504). The school was a boarding school. The first headmaster was a Mr Davies, In 1959, The De La Rue Company donated 1,000 guineas to the school instead of sending out Christmas cards.

A purpose-built school located on Starvecrow Hill (TQ 599 498) was opened on 19 September 1963. On 9 June 1964, The Duke of Edinburgh visited the school to perform the official opening ceremony. Mr Davies retired in July 1964. In 1966, the school had 87 pupils. The next head teacher retired at the end of the Spring Term, 1967. His name was Mr Tudor.

In 1979, a film was made about the school by members of Sevenoaks School. It was made to show the work of the Sevenoaks Voluntary Service and to give an insight into working with people with disabilities. Thomas Delarue School closed in 1989.
