= Beatrice Heron-Maxwell =

British author

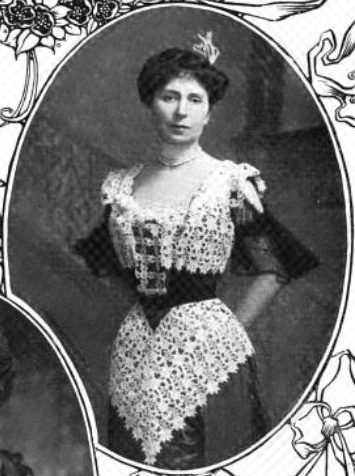
- Born: 15 July 1859; London
- Died: 7 March 1927 (aged 67); St Mary's Hospital
- Occupation: Writer, journalist, playwright
- Spouse(s): F. L. Huddart, Spencer Heron-Maxwell
- Parent(s): Edward Eastwick

Beatrice Maude Emelia Huddart Heron-Maxwell (15 July 1859 – 7 March 1927) was a prolific British author. Her obituary claimed she had written over 700 short stories.

== Biography ==
She was born Beatrice Maude Emelia Eastwick on 15 July 1859 in London, the daughter of Edward Eastwick, orientalist, diplomat, and Member of Parliament, and Rosina Jane Hunter. Her sister was the novelist Florence Eastwick. She married F. Lane Huddart and they had two daughters. She began her writing career after Huddart's death. In 1891, she married Spencer Horatio Walpole Heron Heron-Maxwell, son of Sir John Heron-Maxwell, 6th Baronet of Springkell.

Beatrice Heron-Maxwell published in numerous magazines, including The Bystander, The Harmsworth Monthly Pictorial Magazine, Pall Mall, The Strand, and Tit-Bits. Her The Adventures of a Lady Pearl Broker featured an early female detective, Mollie Delamere. Her novel The Queen Regent was a Ruritanian romance about a young widow who becomes ruler of an island nation.

Beatrice Heron-Maxwell was struck by a car in Westbourne Grove, London and died at St Mary's Hospital two days later.

== Bibliography ==
- The Adventures of a Lady Pearl Broker. London: New Century Press, 1899.
- A Woman's Soul (with Florence Eastwick) London: Horace Marshall and Son, 1900.
- What May Happen: Stories Natural and Supernatural. London: Francis Griffiths, 1901.
- The Queen Regent, 1903.
