= Fairlawne =

Grade I listed house in Plaxtol, Kent, United Kingdom

Coordinates: 51°15′28″N 0°17′01″E

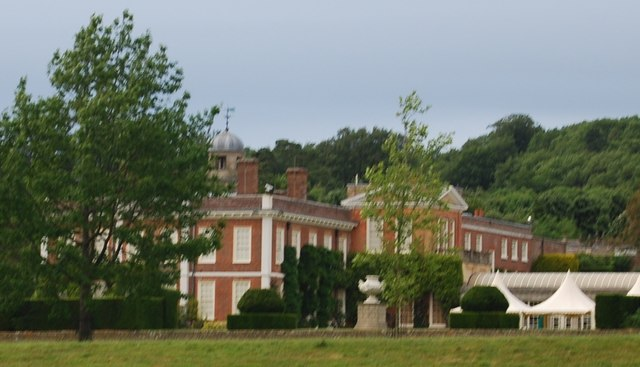
Fairlawne, 2009

Fairlawne is a Grade I listed house in Shipbourne, Kent, England, about 30 miles southeast of central London. The Fairlawne Estate is extensive and stretches to Plaxtol.

== Architecture ==
Fairlawne was rebuilt for Sir Henry Vane the Elder in 1630–55, based on an earlier house. Succeeding generations built additions to the house that were completed in 1723 with the help of James Gibbs, architect of St. Martin-in-the-Fields, Ditchley House, and other notable buildings. More additions were made to Fairlawne in the Victorian era, but these were removed in 1954.

== History ==
In 1722, the poet Christopher Smart was born on the Fairlawne (spelt Fairlawn at that time) estate, where his father, Peter Smart, was the estate steward and Christopher was a playmate of the Vane children. After Peter died in 1733, the Vane family furthered his education by gifts and bequests, enabling him to attend Durham School in northeast England, where he spent his vacations at nearby Raby Castle, another home belonging to the Vanes. The poet had fond memories of Fairlawne, whose remembered beauties are praised in his poems The Hop-Garden and Jubilate Agno.

Lord William Vane was the last Vane to live at Fairlawne, and upon his death the estate passed to his cousin David Papillon, who never took up residence there. Papillon sold the estate to a London merchant, John Ridgway, who owned the estate until 1824.

In 1824 the estate was bought by John Yates, a cotton spinner from Lancashire. In 1835 Fairlawne passed to Marianne Yates in trust, and following her death in 1845 the estate was sold to Joseph Ridgway. The Ridgways continued to live at Fairlawne until 1871.

The estate was bought by the "merchant squire" Edward Cazalet in 1871, and descended to his only son, William Marshall Cazalet (1865-1932), and in turn to his son, Major Peter Cazalet (b. 1907), who was trainer of the Queen Mother's racehorses, which were stabled at the estate for more than twenty years until his death in 1973. The Queen Mother was a frequent visitor to Fairlawne since before World War I, when she was a childhood friend of Peter's sister, Thelma Cazalet. Peter's first wife was Leonora, adopted daughter of the novelist P. G. Wodehouse. Other famous friends and visitors to Fairlawne in the 1950s and 1960s included Noël Coward, Elizabeth Taylor, the historian Elizabeth Longford, and her husband Frank Longford, the Labour peer.

Upon Peter's death in 1973, Fairlawne was inherited by his eldest son, Edward Cazalet. He was unable to continue the racing stable due to his career as a barrister and later a High Court judge. In 1979, Fairlawne was sold to racehorse owner Prince Khalid Abdullah. Khalid died in January 2021, and the current ownership is uncertain.
