= Listed buildings in Shipbourne =

Civil Parish in Kent, England

Shipbourne is a village and civil parish in the Tonbridge and Malling district of Kent, England. It contains 24 listed buildings that are recorded in the National Heritage List for England. Of these all 24 are grade II.

This list is based on the information retrieved online from Historic England.

== Key ==
Grade	Criteria
I	Buildings that are of exceptional interest
II*	Particularly important buildings of more than special interest
II	Buildings that are of special interest

== Listing ==
Name	Grade	Location	Type	Completed (Note: The date given is the date used by Historic England as significant for the initial building or that of an important part in the structure's description.)	Date designated	Grid ref. (Note: The grid reference is based on the British national grid reference system, sometimes known as OSGB36, used by the Ordnance Survey.) Geo-coordinates	Notes	Entry number (Note: The "List Entry Number" is a unique number assigned to each listed building and scheduled monument by Historic England.)	Image	Wikidata
Claygate	II	Claygate Lane			1 August 1952	TQ6074451777; 51°14′33″N 0°18′05″E		1280939	Upload Photo	Q26570027
The Roses	II	Dunks Green Road			3 May 1984	TQ6119452618; 51°15′00″N 0°18′30″E		1072716	Upload Photo	Q26328582
Butcher's Cottage	II	Ightham Road			3 May 1984	TQ5916352151; 51°14′47″N 0°16′45″E		1205005	Upload Photo	Q26500393
Church Gate Cottages	II	1, 2 and 3, Ightham Road			3 May 1984	TQ5919052264; 51°14′50″N 0°16′46″E		1280946	Upload Photo	Q26570034
Hoad Hill Cottage	II	Ightham Road			6 May 1983	TQ5907951325; 51°14′20″N 0°16′39″E		1072718	Upload Photo	Q26328586
The Chaser Public House	II	Ightham Road	pub		3 May 1984	TQ5918252197; 51°14′48″N 0°16′46″E		1362037	The Chaser Public House More images	Q26643972
The Old Post Office	II	Ightham Road			3 May 1984	TQ5916752169; 51°14′47″N 0°16′45″E		1072717	Upload Photo	Q26328584
Woodhall	II	Ightham Road			3 May 1984	TQ5916951780; 51°14′35″N 0°16′44″E		1205011	Upload Photo	Q26500397
Wilmot Cottage	II	Ivy Hatch			12 March 1987	TQ5738252964; 51°15′15″N 0°15′14″E		1072584	Upload Photo	Q26328305
Barn 30 Yards to North West of Great Budds	II	Mote Road			3 May 1984	TQ5759852203; 51°14′50″N 0°15′24″E		1072719	Upload Photo	Q26328588
Great Budds	II	Mote Road			1 August 1952	TQ5762052172; 51°14′49″N 0°15′25″E		1205015	Upload Photo	Q26500401
Little Budds	II	Mote Road			3 May 1984	TQ5770852117; 51°14′47″N 0°15′29″E		1362038	Upload Photo	Q26643973
Coach House 10 Yards to the North of Puttenden Manor Farmhouse	II	Puttenden Road			3 May 1984	TQ6107052234; 51°14′48″N 0°18′23″E		1072596	Upload Photo	Q26328328
Puttenden Manor Farmhouse	II	Puttenden Road			25 August 1959	TQ6103752214; 51°14′47″N 0°18′21″E		1280893	Upload Photo	Q26569983
Old Woodcocks	II	Reeds Lane			3 May 1984	TQ6042952038; 51°14′42″N 0°17′50″E		1072576	Upload Photo	Q26328292
Fairhill	II	Riding Lane			3 May 1984	TQ5737351180; 51°14′17″N 0°15′11″E		1072577	Upload Photo	Q26328293
Stone Cottage	II	Roughway Lane			3 May 1984	TQ6144152558; 51°14′58″N 0°18′43″E		1072579	Upload Photo	Q26328296
The Kentish Rifleman Public House	II	Roughway Lane			3 May 1984	TQ6124852606; 51°14′59″N 0°18′33″E		1072578	Upload Photo	Q26328295
Boundary Wall and Lychgate to the Church of St Giles	II	Stumble Hill			3 May 1984	TQ5916352235; 51°14′49″N 0°16′45″E		1072581	Upload Photo	Q26328299
Church of St Giles	II	Stumble Hill	church building		25 August 1959	TQ5913252242; 51°14′50″N 0°16′43″E		1072580	Church of St Giles More images	Q26328298
Collens Cottage	II	The Common			3 May 1984	TQ5963352231; 51°14′49″N 0°17′09″E		1204972	Upload Photo	Q26500362
The White House	II	The Common			3 May 1984	TQ5958852201; 51°14′48″N 0°17′07″E		1362036	Upload Photo	Q26643971
The Wood House	II	Upper Green Road			3 May 1984	TQ5951752051; 51°14′43″N 0°17′03″E		1362096	Upload Photo	Q26644026
Yew Tree Cottage and Shipbourne Village Hall	II	Upper Green Road			3 May 1984	TQ5953552309; 51°14′52″N 0°17′04″E		1072582	Upload Photo	Q26328302

== See also ==
- Grade I listed buildings in Kent
- Grade II* listed buildings in Kent

== Sources ==
- Newman, John (2012) [1969], Kent: West and the Weald, The Buildings of England, New Haven and London: Yale University Press, ISBN 978-0-300-18509-6
