= John Hollams =

English solicitor and legal reformer (1820–1910)

Sir John Hollams
- Born: September 23, 1820; Loose, Kent, England
- Died: May 3, 1910 (aged 89); Tonbridge, Kent, England
- Resting place: Brompton Cemetery, London
- Occupation: Solicitor
- Years active: 1844–1910
- Known for: President of the Law Society; Member of the Judicature Commission; Founding partner of Hollams, Son & Coward
- Title: Knight Bachelor
- Spouse: Rice Allfree (m. 1845; died 1891)
- Children: 3 sons (including John Hollams Jr. and Percy Hollams)
- Parent(s): Rev. John Hollams and Mary Pettit

Sir John Hollams (23 September 1820− 3 May 1910) was an English solicitor. For more than 60 years he was a partner in one of London's most significant law firms and was involved in several high profile cases, including Bank of England v Vagliano Bros (1891), British South Africa Co v Companhia de Moçambique (1893), and the trial of Leander Starr Jameson and his compatriots for their actions in the Jameson Raid in 1895-1896. A President of the Law Society of England and Wales, he served on the Judicature Commission which was instrumental in drafting the Supreme Court of Judicature Act 1873 and the Supreme Court of Judicature Act 1875; laws that substantially restructured the legal system in Britain.

== Life and career ==
Born in Loose, Kent, John Hollams was the son of John Hollams and his wife Mary Pettit. His father was the curate overseeing Loose. His grandfather, also named John Hollams, served as the mayor of Deal, Kent five times and was knighted in 1831. Poor health prevented the youngest John Hollams from attending school in his youth, and he was educated privately. Ill health plagued much of his family, and his father (died 1841, aged 52), brother, and three of his sisters all died from consumption during his formative years. Ill health further prevented him from continuing the family tradition of attending the University of Cambridge, and he began his legal career apprenticed as a clerk to a local solicitor in Maidstone.

In 1840 Hollams went to London to join the firm of Brown, Marten, & Thomas (now Clifford Chance). In 1844 he was admitted as a solicitor, and in 1845 he became a partner in the firm of Brown, Marten, & Thomas. He remained a partner at that firm for more than 60 years; with the firm becoming Thomas & Hollams upon the retirement of senior partners Marten & Brown, and later Hollams, Son, & Coward.

At the time of his death, The Guardian wrote "Sir John Hollams had for many years held a position among solicitors to which few parallels can be found. His firm was probably the highest in standing and importance in the City of London in what is commonly known as "commercial" business. No solicitor is the city was more respected and more popular." His firm was involved in many important commercial litigations in the British Empire during the 19th century, among them Bank of England v Vagliano Bros (1891) and British South Africa Co v Companhia de Moçambique (1893). He also served as the defense lawyer for Leander Starr Jameson and his confederates for their actions during the Jameson Raid in December 1895 and January 1896.

In 1866 Hollams was elected to the council of the Law Society of England and Wales. There he served on the Judicature Commission whose work was responsible for drafting the Supreme Court of Judicature Act 1873 and the Supreme Court of Judicature Act 1875. For his work with that commission he was honored with the offer of a knighthood; an offer he turned down. He served as president of the Law Society in 1878-1879; at which time his portrait was painted by John Collier for hanging in the Law Society's hall.

From 1879 until his death in 1910, Hollams served as one of two solicitors on the Incorporated Council of Law Reporting. In 1882 he was made deputy lieutenant for the County of London. He also served as a Justice of the peace for Kent. He was made a Knight Bachelor in the 1902 Birthday Honours and knighted by King Edward VII at Buckingham Palace on 18 December 1902. In 1906 a memoir of his legal career, Jottings of an old solicitor, was published by John Murray.

Hollams died at his country estate Dene Park near Tonbridge, Kent on 3 May 1910. His funeral service was held at St Paul's Church, Knightsbridge and he was buried at Brompton Cemetery. He married Rice Allfree in 1844; a union that lasted until her death in 1891. The couple had three sons.

== Bibliography ==
- Judy Slinn (1993). Clifford Chance: Its Origins and Development. Granta Editions. ISBN 9780906782989.
