= Scope (charity) =

UK disability charity

- Scope logo
- Formation: 1951
- Headquarters: London, E15
- Region served: England and Wales
- Interim Chief Executive: John McLachlan
- Website: scope.org.uk

Scope (previously known as the National Spastics Society) is a disability charity in England and Wales that campaigns to change negative attitudes about disability, provides direct services, and educates the public. The organisation was founded in 1952 by a group of parents and social workers who wanted to ensure that their disabled children had the right to a decent education. Originally focused on cerebral palsy, Scope now embraces all conditions and impairment. Scope subscribes to the social model of disability rather than the medical model of disability – that a person is disabled by the barriers placed in front of them by society, not because of their condition or impairment.

== History ==
Scope was founded as the National Spastics Society on 9 October 1951 by Ian Dawson-Shepherd, Eric Hodgson, Alex Moira and a social worker, Jean Garwood, with the aim of improving and expanding services for people with cerebral palsy.

From 1955 to 1989, the society ran the Thomas Delarue School, a specialist secondary boarding school at Tonbridge, Kent. Scope ran several other schools until they were transferred to another organisation in 2018.

Over time, thanks in large part to the influence of Bill Hargreaves, the first trustee with cerebral palsy, the charity's aims extended to improving and expanding services for people with cerebral palsy and disabled people in general. Bill's pioneering work in employment in the 1950s supported over 1,500 disabled people into their first jobs. In 1962, he set up the 62 Clubs where disabled people could choose and control their own leisure activities. Through its employment services, Scope continues to support disabled people to have the same opportunities as everyone else.

In 1963, the organisation merged with the British Council for the Welfare of Spastics to become The Spastics Society. The Spastics Society provided sheltered workshops and day centres for people with cerebral palsy (commonly referred to as spastics at the time, despite spasticity being a symptom of only one variant of cerebral palsy), who were seen as being unemployable in mainstream society. The Society provided residential units and schools, as well as opening a chain of charity shops.

The term spastic had long been used as a general playground insult, so in 1994 the organisation changed its name to Scope.

In November 1996, Scope AGM voted in favour of an individual membership scheme to give a voice to the 20,000 people that Scope and its local groups are in contact with every year – the first major UK disability charity to do so. In 1998, Scope individual members voted in elections to Executive Council.

In 2017, Scope launched its new strategy – Everyday equality – which set out how the charity would campaign to support disabled people. The strategy sets out an ambition to offer information, support and advice to two million disabled people and their families every year.

In 2018 Scope transferred 51 services, 31 care homes, 10 day services, and 1,300 staff to Salutem Healthcare as part of a major shift away from service provision.

=== 2026 apology ===
In 2026, Scope apologized for its behaviour earlier that year in violation of the Equality Act. Scope had excluded a choir from the London Marathon, arguing the choir didn't meet Scope's commitment to inclusion. Scope had excluded the entire choir because one of the members of the choir's criticism of gender ideology. Scope apologized following a lawsuit by the excluded choir, aided by the Free Speech Union.

== Campaigns ==
In 2004 Scope launched the Time to Get Equal campaign to reduce disablism, which it defines as "discriminatory, oppressive or abusive behaviour arising from the belief that disabled people are inferior to others".

In 2014 Scope ran a campaign called End The Awkward fronted by comedian Alex Brooker. The campaign used comedy to shine a light on the awkwardness that many people feel about disability. Scope's End The Awkward campaign continued in 2015 when Scope teamed up with Channel 4 to run a series of short films entitled What Not to Do, which demonstrated how not to behave in situations including a blind date, a job interview and at the hairdressers. Scope also created an A-Z of sex and disability.

In 2016 Scope launched its third year of End The Awkward where it introduced its H.I.D.E. concept, a mnemonic which stands for: Say 'Hi'; Introduce yourself; Don't panic; End the awkward, to encourage people to talk to disabled people rather than avoid them.

In 2017 Scope partnered with Virgin Media to run their Work With Me and Support To Work efforts, providing online advice and support for disabled people seeking work.

== Publications ==
N.S.S. news: the monthly magazine of the National Spastics Society, was published from 1953 to 1958 and became Spastics news: magazine of the National Spastics Society, which ran from 1958 to 1984. It then became Disability Now, which ran from 1984 until 2012, when it ceased publication.
