= F. M. Hollams =

British painter

Frances Mabel Hollams
- Born: 1877
- Died: 1963 (aged 85–86)
- Known for: Painting
- Spouse: Charles Lionel Fox

Frances Mabel Hollams (1877–1963), who signed her works F.M. Hollams, was a popular British painter of horses and dogs, active in the first three decades of the 20th century. She is noted for her technique of painting on wood panel with no background, so that the grain of the wood is visible. Growing up at Dene Park in Shipbourne she later moved to Puttenden Manor near the hamlet of Dunks Green.

== Education ==
Mabel studied under the artist Frank Calderdon and, at a time when most schools did not accept female students, she studied in Paris at Académie Julian.

== Career ==
Hollams was a prolific painter of animals, mainly horses. Her works occasionally come up for auction and fetch reasonable prices. She painted for Royalty and many aristocratic families. One of her paintings, a royal horse, hangs in the Mounted Branch Museum at Imber Court. In 1899 was elected to the Society of Women Artists.

She was married to Charles Lionel Fox, a land agent who worked for racehorse owners the Cazelet family.

She signed her pieces with "F.M. Hollams".

== Works ==
A partial list of works is:

- A Chestnut Thorough Called 'Enterprise', oil, National Trust Collection, England
- A Roan Horse, oil on varnished pantel, National Trust, England
- 'Columcille,' a Horse in a Stable, 1937, oil on canvas, National Trust, England
- General Fanshawe's Hunter, 'Ich Dien', 1949, oil on canvas, 1st The Queen's Dragoon Guards Heritage Trust, England
- General Fanshawe's Hunter 'Mayfly', 1943, oil on canvas, 1st The Queen's Dragoon Guards Heritage Trust, England
- 'Halse', a Chestnut Hunter, 1926, oil on panel, National Trust, England
- His Last Fence, before 1906
- Something Wrong, before 1898, sketch, illustration
