= Sir John Heron-Maxwell, 4th Baronet =

Scottish officer in the British Army and politician

Lieutenant-General Sir John Shaw Stewart Heron-Maxwell, 4th Baronet (29 June 1772 – 29 January 1830), known as John Maxwell until 1803, was a Scottish officer in the British Army and a politician.

== Life ==
He was the 4th son of Sir William Maxwell, 3rd Baronet, of Springkell in Dumfriesshire. His mother Margaret was the daughter of Sir Michael Stewart, 3rd Baronet, of Blackhall, Renfrewshire.

He joined the army in 1788 as an Ensign in the 68th Foot, rising to brevet Lieutenant colonel in 1797, Colonel in 1805 and Lieutenant general in 1819.

In 1802 he married Mary Heron, the only surviving child of Patrick Heron, a founder of the Ayr Bank and MP for Kirkcudbright Stewartry. When her father died in 1803, she inherited his estates, and John changed his name to Heron-Maxwell.

His own father died the following year, and as the oldest surviving son Heron-Maxwell received a further inheritance and his father's baronetcy. He then sought the help of his friend Lord Dalkeith to find a seat in Parliament. Dalkeith's father the 3rd Duke of Buccleuch owned the Drumlanrig estate in Dumfriesshire and had a strong influence in Dumfries elections.

However, Heron-Maxwell's chance did not come until the 1807 general election, when he was returned unopposed as the Member of Parliament (MP) for Dumfries Burghs. He is not known to have spoken or voted in the House of Commons, and stood down at the 1812 general election.

Having gone on half pay from the army in 1802, he resumed full-time service in 1814.

== Family ==
His daughter Jane Stuart Heron Maxwell (1806-1886) married John Shaw Stewart.

Parliament of the United Kingdom
Preceded by Henry Erskine	Member of Parliament for Dumfries Burghs; 1807 – 1812	Succeeded by Lord William Douglas
Baronetage of Nova Scotia
Preceded by William Maxwell	Baronet (of Springkell); 1804 – 1830	Succeeded by Patrick Heron-Maxwell
