= British jump racing Champion Trainer =

British horse trainer whose horses have won the most prize money during a season

The Champion Trainer of National Hunt racing in Great Britain is the trainer whose horses have won the most prize money during a season. The list below shows the Champion Trainer for each season since 1945–46.

== Winners ==
- 1945–46 - Tommy Rayson
- 1946–47 - Fulke Walwyn
- 1947–48 - Fulke Walwyn
- 1948–49 - Fulke Walwyn
- 1949–50 - Peter Cazalet
- 1950–51 - Fred Rimell
- 1951–52 - Neville Crump
- 1952–53 - Vincent O'Brien
- 1953–54 - Vincent O'Brien
- 1954–55 - Ryan Price
- 1955–56 - William Hall
- 1956–57 - Neville Crump
- 1957–58 - Fulke Walwyn
- 1958–59 - Ryan Price
- 1959–60 - Peter Cazalet
- 1960–61 - Fred Rimell
- 1961–62 - Ryan Price
- 1962–63 - Keith Piggott
- 1963–64 - Fulke Walwyn
- 1964–65 - Peter Cazalet
- 1965–66 - Ryan Price
- 1966–67 - Ryan Price
- 1967–68 - Denys Smith
- 1968–69 - Fred Rimell
- 1969–70 - Fred Rimell
- 1970–71 - Fred Winter
- 1971–72 - Fred Winter
- 1972–73 - Fred Winter
- 1973–74 - Fred Winter
- 1974–75 - Fred Winter
- 1975–76 - Fred Rimell
- 1976–77 - Fred Winter
- 1977–78 - Fred Winter
- 1978–79 - Peter Easterby
- 1979–80 - Peter Easterby
- 1980–81 - Peter Easterby
- 1981–82 - Michael Dickinson
- 1982–83 - Michael Dickinson
- 1983–84 - Michael Dickinson
- 1984–85 - Fred Winter
- 1985–86 - Nicky Henderson
- 1986–87 - Nicky Henderson
- 1987–88 - David Elsworth
- 1988–89 - Martin Pipe
- 1989–90 - Martin Pipe
- 1990–91 - Martin Pipe
- 1991–92 - Martin Pipe
- 1992–93 - Martin Pipe
- 1993–94 - David Nicholson
- 1994–95 - David Nicholson
- 1995–96 - Martin Pipe
- 1996–97 - Martin Pipe
- 1997–98 - Martin Pipe
- 1998–99 - Martin Pipe
- 1999–00 - Martin Pipe
- 2000–01 - Martin Pipe
- 2001–02 - Martin Pipe
- 2002–03 - Martin Pipe
- 2003–04 - Martin Pipe
- 2004–05 - Martin Pipe
- 2005–06 - Paul Nicholls
- 2006–07 - Paul Nicholls
- 2007–08 - Paul Nicholls
- 2008–09 - Paul Nicholls
- 2009–10 - Paul Nicholls
- 2010–11 - Paul Nicholls
- 2011–12 - Paul Nicholls
- 2012–13 - Nicky Henderson
- 2013–14 - Paul Nicholls
- 2014–15 - Paul Nicholls
- 2015–16 - Paul Nicholls
- 2016–17 - Nicky Henderson
- 2017–18 - Nicky Henderson
- 2018–19 - Paul Nicholls
- 2019–20 - Nicky Henderson
- 2020–21 - Paul Nicholls
- 2021–22 - Paul Nicholls
- 2022–23 - Paul Nicholls
- 2023–24 - Willie Mullins
- 2024–25 - Willie Mullins
- 2025–26 - Dan Skelton

== Records ==
- Most titles - 15, Martin Pipe
- Most consecutive titles - 10, Martin Pipe (1996–2005)

== See also ==
- British jump racing Champion Jockey
- British flat racing Champion Trainer
- British flat racing Champion Jockey
