= Patrick Heron (1736–1803) =

Scottish banker and politician

- Born: 1736
- Died: June 1803 (aged 66–67)
- Occupation: politician

Patrick Heron of Kirroughtree (c. 1736 – 9 June 1803) was a Scottish banker and politician. From 1794 to 1803 he was a Whig Member of Parliament for Kirkcudbright Stewartry.

He was the grandson of Patrick Heron of Kirroughtrie, who had been MP for the Stewartry from 1727 to 1741. His mother Margaret was the daughter of John Mackie of Palgoun. He was educated at the University of Glasgow.

He married Jean Home, in 1761, daughter of Henry Home, Lord Kames, but the couple were divorced in 1772. In 1775, he married Lady Elizabeth Cochrane, daughter of Thomas Cochrane, 8th Earl of Dundonald, and cousin to the diarist James Boswell.

He was a founder of a bank in Ayr, Douglas, Heron & Company, which went bankrupt during the credit crisis of 1772.

Heron was elected unopposed at a by-election in March 1795 as the MP for the Kirkcudbright Stewartry, filling the vacancy caused by the death of Alexander Stewart. His election was the result of a deal brokered with the support of Henry Dundas whereby he was to alternate the seat with two others. However, Heron managed to keep the seat for himself and was re-elected unopposed in 1796. At the general election in July 1802, he faced a contest from the Tory candidate Montgomery Stewart, son of the Earl of Galloway. Heron was returned, but Stewart lodged a petition, and on 10 May 1803 the result was overturned in Stewart's favour by the Committee of the House of Commons which heard the case.

The campaigns are recorded in three works by Robert Burns, now known as the Heron Ballads. Burns was himself a supporter of Heron:

An' there will be trusty Kerroughtree,

Whose honour was ever his law,

If the virtues were pack'd in a parcel,

His worth might be sample for a'.

Heron died on 9 June 1803, aged about 68. He was survived by only one child, a daughter Mary. She had married John Maxwell, who changed his name to Heron-Maxwell when they inherited Mary's father's estates. The following year he succeeded to his father's baronetcy, becoming Sir John Heron-Maxwell, 4th Baronet.

Parliament of Great Britain
Preceded by Alexander Stewart	Member of Parliament for Kirkcudbright Stewartry; 1795 – 1800	Succeeded by Parliament of the United Kingdom
Parliament of the United Kingdom
Preceded by Parliament of Great Britain	Member of Parliament for Kirkcudbright Stewartry; 1801 – 1803	Succeeded by Montgomery Stewart
