= Henry Gage, 6th Viscount Gage =

Viscount Gage of Firle Place during the 20th century

Henry Rainald Gage, 6th Viscount Gage, KCVO, (30 December 1895 – 27 February 1982) was Viscount Gage of Firle Place during much of the 20th century.

He was born to Henry Charles Gage and Leila Georgina Peel. His Gage family ancestry included extensive roots in British North America from the Schuyler family, the Delancey family, and the Van Cortlandt family.

Upon the death of his father in 1912, he succeeded him as Viscount Gage when he was only 16. Gage served in World War I as a Captain of the Coldstream Guards, seeing action in both France and Belgium. He was appointed Honorary Colonel of the 58th (Home Counties) Field Brigade, Royal Artillery, on 17 June 1936. He held the office of Parliamentary Private Secretary between 1924 and 1929, to the Secretary of State, India. He held the office of Lord-in-Waiting between 1924 and 1929. He held the office of Deputy Lieutenant (D.L.) of Sussex in 1927. He held the office of Justice of the Peace (J.P.) for Sussex. He held the office of Lord-in-Waiting between 1931 and 1939.

In 1931, Gage donated papers and letters written between 1758 and 1764 by his famous relative General Sir Thomas Gage to the William L. Clements Library of Ann Arbor, Michigan. Gage later (between 1958 and 1965) donated letters and documents from ancestral in-law Vice-Admiral Sir Peter Warren to the Sussex Archaeological Society in Lewes.

At the beginning of World War II, the family moved to a smaller house, and nearby Southover girls' school in Lewes was evacuated for a short time to Gage's family home in Firle. After they had moved, Canadian soldiers were quartered at the family manor. In 1952, Gage's mother-in-law died, leaving artwork to his wife, Imogen. The couple decided to showcase the art in their home, opening Firle Place to public tours in 1954.

In 1968, Imogen died. Gage was remarried in 1971 to Diana Cavendish. He died in 1982 at the age of 86. A stained glass window by the artist John Piper was installed in St Peter's Church, Firle, and dedicated to his memory.

He was appointed Deputy President of Sussex Wildlife Trust on 13 January 1962 and retired at the AGM on 29 April 1967. He is listed as the Director of Over Timber (Fawley) Ltd. and of Firle Estate Co.Ltd

== Family ==
On 26 February 1931, Gage married Alexandra Imogen Clair Grenfell (Imogen), daughter of William Grenfell, 1st Baron Desborough; they had three children:

- George John St. Clere Gage, 7th Viscount Gage (8 July 1932 – 1993)
- (Henry) Nicolas Gage, 8th Viscount Gage (born 9 April 1934)
- The Hon. Camilla Jane Gage (born 12 July 1937), married Edward Cazalet

Political offices
Preceded by The Lord Marley	Lord-in-waiting; 1931–1939	Succeeded by Viscount Bridport
Peerage of Ireland
Preceded by Henry Gage	Viscount Gage; 1912–1982	Succeeded by George Gage
