= Edward Cazalet =

British judge

Sir Edward Cazalet DL
- Born: Edward Stephen Cazalet; 26 April 1936 (age 90); Marylebone, London, England
- Education: Eton; Christ Church, Oxford
- Occupations: Barrister and judge
- Spouse: Hon. Camilla Jane Gage
- Children: 3, including Hal Cazalet and Lara Cazalet
- Parent(s): Peter Cazalet; Leonora Wodehouse
- Relatives: P. G. Wodehouse (maternal grandfather); Henry Gage, 6th Viscount Gage (father-in-law)

Sir Edward Stephen Cazalet DL (born 26 April 1936) is a retired judge of the High Court of England and Wales.

== Early life ==
Edward Cazalet was born in 1936, the son of the Queen Mother's racehorse trainer Peter Cazalet and Leonora Wodehouse, the stepdaughter of P. G. Wodehouse. The Cazalet family descended from French Huguenots. Cazalet was educated at Eton and Christ Church, Oxford, where he was master of the university drag hounds. His friends included Sir Simon Hornby, who would later marry his sister, Sheran.

== Career ==
Cazalet is a barrister, High Court judge and an authority on P. G. Wodehouse. He was appointed Queen's Counsel in 1980. Cazalet is the principal trustee of Wodehouse's estate, and in 2016, was "delighted" when the British Library acquired the Wodehouse archive. He is a member of The Other Club, a London dining club.

== Personal life ==
He is married to the Honourable Camilla Jane Gage, daughter of Henry Gage, 6th Viscount Gage and they have children:

- David Benedict Cazalet (born 24 June 1967)
- Henry Pelham Cazalet (born 16 September 1969), opera singer
- Lara Cazalet (born 1973), actress
