= Heron-Maxwell baronets =

Baronetcy in the Baronetage of Nova Scotia

The Maxwell, later Heron-Maxwell Baronetcy, of Springkell in the County of Dumfries, is a title in the Baronetage of Nova Scotia. It was created on 7 February 1683 for Patrick Maxwell. The fourth Baronet sat as member of parliament for Dumfries Burghs. He married Mary, daughter and heiress of Patrick Heron, and assumed the additional surname of Heron. The sixth Baronet was a captain in the Royal Navy. As of 30 June 2013, the present holder of the baronetcy has not successfully proven his succession to the baronetcy and is therefore not on the Official Roll of the Baronetage (for more information follow this external link).

== Maxwell, later Heron-Maxwell baronets, of Springkell (1683) ==
- Sir Patrick Maxwell, 1st Baronet (c. 1640–1723)
- Sir William Maxwell, 2nd Baronet (1703–1760)
- Sir William Maxwell, 3rd Baronet (c. 1740–1804)
- Sir John Shaw Stewart Heron-Maxwell, 4th Baronet (1772–1830)
- Sir Patrick Heron-Maxwell, 5th Baronet (1805–1844)
- Sir John Heron-Maxwell, 6th Baronet (1808–1885)
- Sir John Robert Heron-Maxwell, 7th Baronet (1836–1910)
- Sir Ivor Walter Heron-Maxwell, 8th Baronet (1871–1928)
- Sir Patrick Ivor Heron-Maxwell, 9th Baronet (1916–1982)
- Sir Nigel Mellor Heron-Maxwell, presumed 10th Baronet (born 1944)

The heir apparent is the present holder's only son David Mellor Heron-Maxwell, Younger of Springkell (born 1975).

== Notable family members ==
- Beatrice Heron-Maxwell (1859 – 1927), writer
- Naomi Heron-Maxwell (1913 – 1983), aviator

== See also ==
- Maxwell baronets
- Heron baronets
