= Fort Sill's Old Post Guard House =

Historic structure at Fort Sill, OK

Old Post Guard House
- Former name: Geronimo's Guard House; Old Guard House
- Established: 1872
- Location: Fort Sill, Comanche County, Oklahoma
- Coordinates: 34.669017°N 98.388133°W
- Type: United States Cavalry History Museum
- Curators: Fort Sill National Historic Landmark and Museum
- Architects: 4th Cavalry Regiment; 10th Cavalry Regiment
- Owner: Fort Sill Army Installation
- Website: Fort Sill Historic Landmark and Museum

Fort Sill's Old Post Guard House was established in 1872 with completed erection in the summer of 1873. The limestone structure initially served as Cavalry barracks subsequently provisioned for a military stockade. The American frontier lodging quarters, refined by native sedimentary rock, is illustrative of the late 19th century confinement and relief formalities for recalcitrant tribal leaders and Indian prisoners of war pending the common soldiery of the Army on the Frontier and Federal Indian Policy. The domestic stone framework serves with historical significance considering the calendar span of the American Indian assimilation commencing in the late nineteenth century.

The Fort Sill Museum ― United States Army Field Artillery Center Museum ― was formally established in the Fort Sill's Old Post Guard House on December 11, 1934.

== Henry Warren Wagon Train of 1871 ==
Kiowa tribal chiefs Satank, Satanta, and Big Tree were incarcerated at the Fort Sill's Old Post Guard House for pernicious offenses in Young County, Texas known as the Warren Wagon Train raid.

== Fort Sill and American Indian prisoners of war ==
By Acts of Congress and Department of War appropriations in 1894, the Fort Sill military reservation was pledged as a resettlement dominion for the American Indian prisoners of war confined at Fort Pickens and Mount Vernon Barracks within South Alabama.

U.S. Statutes for Relief of American Indian Prisoners of War

Date of Enactment	Public Law	U.S. Statute	Page No.	U.S. President
August 6, 1894	P.L. 53-228	28 Stat. 233	238	Grover Cleveland
February 12, 1895	P.L. 53-83	28 Stat. 654	658	Grover Cleveland
June 28, 1902	P.L. 57-182	32 Stat. 419	467-468	Theodore Roosevelt
February 18, 1904	P.L. 58-22	33 Stat. 15	26	Theodore Roosevelt
August 24, 1912	P.L. 62-335	37 Stat. 518	534	William H. Taft

== See also ==
- Blockhouse on Signal Mountain
- Cultural assimilation of Native Americans
- Ketch Ranch House
- Medicine Park, Oklahoma
- Museum of the Great Plains
- Wichita Mountains Wildlife Refuge

== Bibliography ==
- "Geronimo's Guard House". The Gateway to Oklahoma History. Oklahoma Historical Society.
- "The Geronimo Hotel". The Gateway to Oklahoma History. Oklahoma Historical Society. 1979.
- "Old Guard House". The Gateway to Oklahoma History. Oklahoma Historical Society.
- "Fort Sill, Oklahoma * The Old Guard House ~ Built 1868 * Vintage Real Photo Postcard Circa. 1908". Worthopedia. WorthPoint Corporation.
- "Old Guard House, Fort Sill, Okla" [The stone Guard House at Fort Sill, Oklahoma was built between 1872 and 1873 by the "Buffalo Soldiers" of the 10th Cavalry Regiment]. DigitalPrairie.ok.gov ~ Oklahoma Department of Libraries (Oklahoma Postcard). Curt Teich & Co. Archived from the original on December 22, 2024 – via Sooner News Co. ~ Lawton, Oklahoma.
- Nye, Wilbur Sturtevant (1969). Carbine and Lance: The Story of Old Fort Sill. Norman, Oklahoma: University of Oklahoma Press. pp. 144, 147, 168–170, 229, 234, 301, 334. ISBN 978-0806187181. LCCN 79013137. OCLC 778993468.
- Bentley, Bill F. (January 5, 1969). "Geronimo, Fierce Apache, Spent Last 15 Years as POW at Fort Sill". Lawton Constitution, Vol. 20, No. 1, Ed. 1 Sunday, January 5, 1969. Lawton, Oklahoma: The Lawton Constitution. p. 19F.

== Video media archive ==
- Geronimo At Fort Sill - POW - Guard House on YouTube
