= Blockhouse on Signal Mountain =

Building in Oklahoma, United States

- U.S. National Register of Historic Places
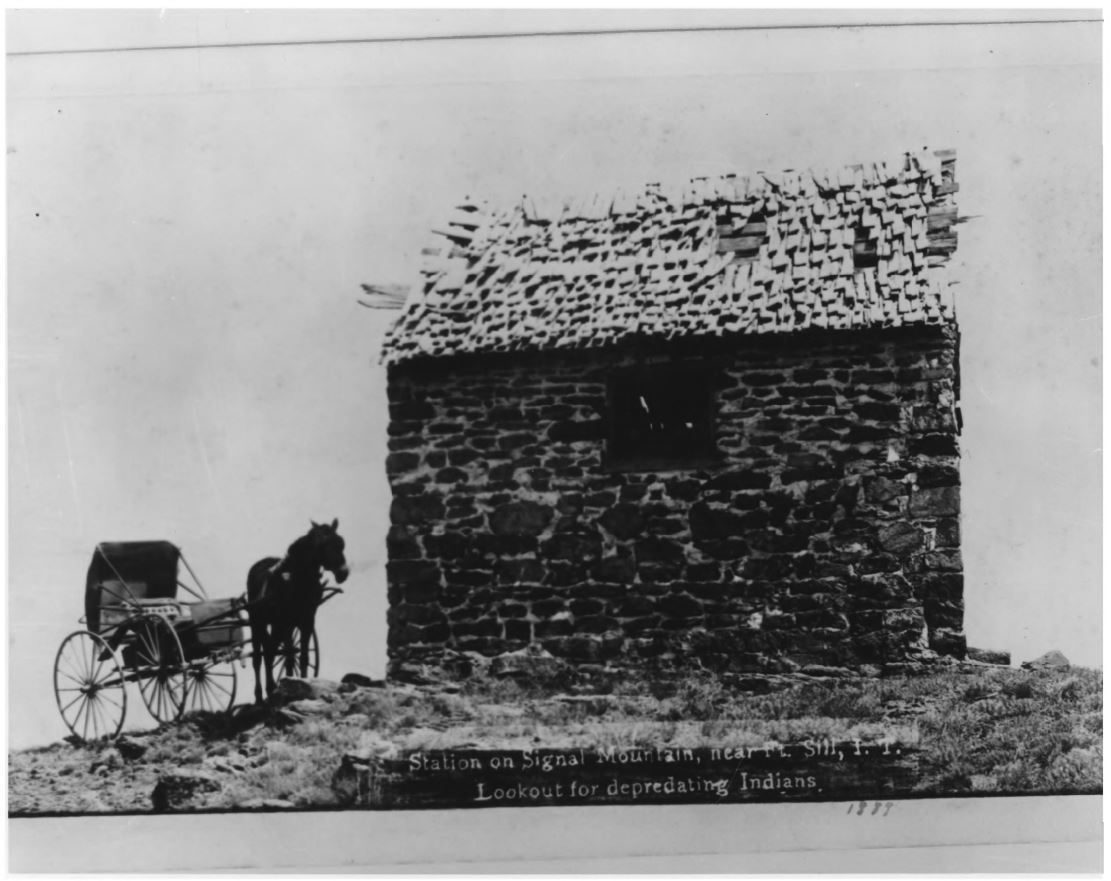
- Blockhouse on Signal Mountain

- Location within Oklahoma
- Nearest city: Lawton, Oklahoma
- Coordinates: 34.67433°N 98.49058°W
- Area: 15 acres (6.1 ha)
- Built: 1871
- Part of: Fort Sill, Oklahoma (ID66000629)
- NRHP reference No.: 78002228
- Added to NRHP: November 29, 1978

Blockhouse on Signal Mountain is within the Fort Sill Military Reservation, north of Lawton, Oklahoma. The rock architecture is located along Mackenzie Hill Road at the summit of Signal Mountain within the Fort Sill West Range being the Oklahoma administrative division of Comanche County.

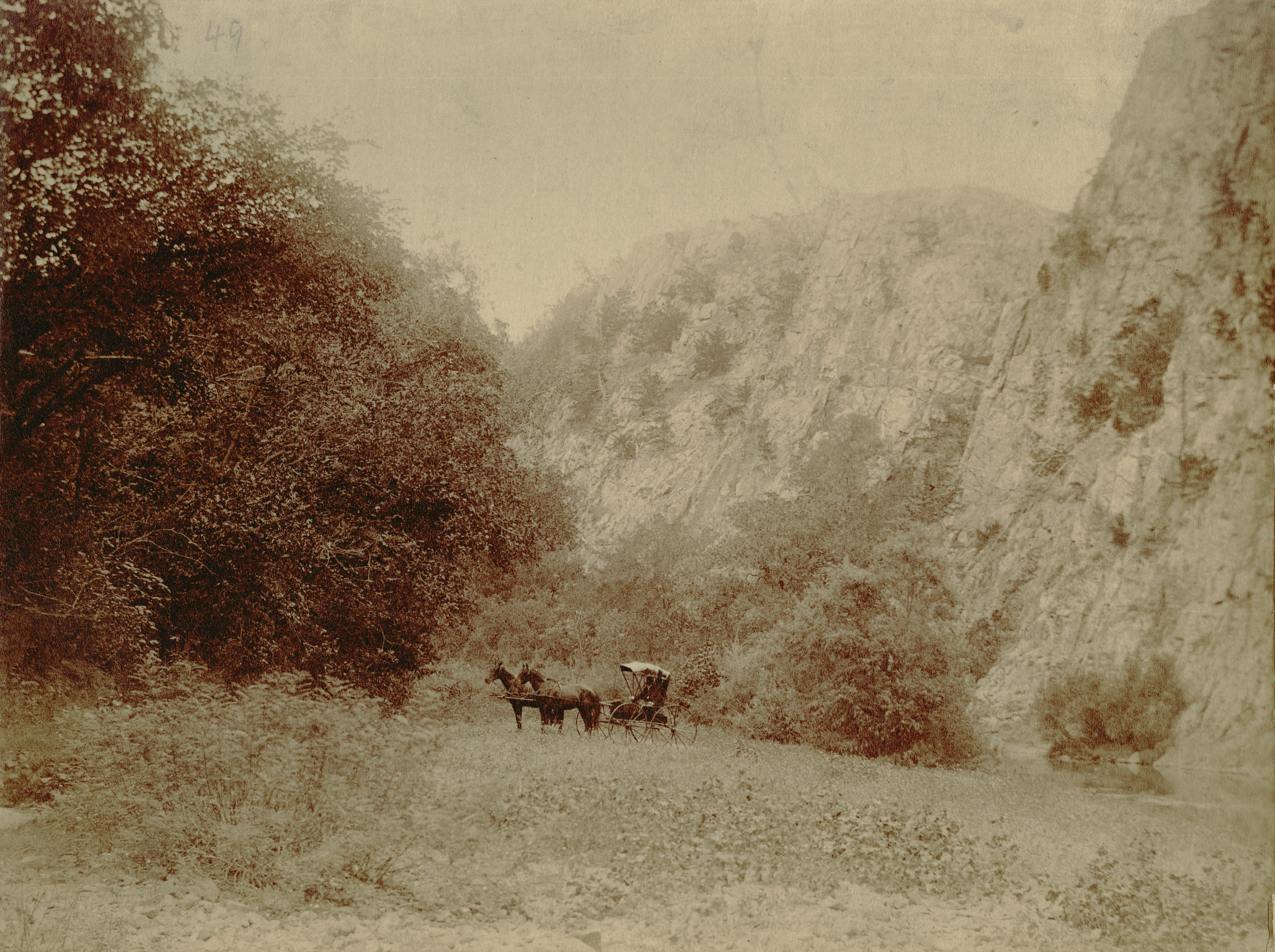
Medicine Bluffs, ca. 1895

In May 1868, the United States Cavalry reservation was entitled Camp Wichita as situated within the mixed grass prairie meadow of Medicine Bluffs. The blockhouse was established in 1871 pursuant to the Medicine Lodge Treaty of 1867 cordially looming over the course of time as the Kiowa-Comanche-Apache Opening of 1901.

The stone structure was constructed on the summit of Wichita Mountain's Signal Mountain encompassing a terrestrial elevation of 1,750 feet (530 m). The shelter has a dimension of 14 feet (4.3 m) by 16 feet (4.9 m) with a structural exterior consisting of native stone collected within the vicinity of the Wichita Mountains. The four wall dwelling was erected as some of the first limestone architecture as part of Fort Sill's Old Post Corral or United States Army Quartermaster Corps fortification foraged during the American Indian Wars on the American frontier.

The observation post was settled as a meteorological observatory and signal station. The elevated station provided support for military communications between Signal Mountain, Medicine Bluffs, Mountain Scott, and Fort Reno geographically positioned north of the Canadian River within the Great Plains. The Fort Sill, Indian Territory signal station officially commenced atmospheric observations and telegraphic communications on June 23, 1875 with meteorological reports beginning on September 9, 1875.

The Army Signal Corps employed flag semaphore, heliograph, and signal lamp before implementing the signal field wire lines enabling electric telegraphic communications. The optical communication applied visible light along a visual topographical line of sight for distant information exchange. The semaphore communications served as an intelligence assessment of the Wichita Mountains cadastre while safeguarding the transcontinental railroad and territorial prairie trails as an integration of the Westward Expansion Trails.

The mountainous altitude served as an observation of the Plains Indians equine flights disrupting the manifest destiny of westbound wagon trains ostracizing the Reconstruction era at the crest of the progressive Gilded Age. The high ground outpost continually anticipated the spontaneous mobilization of the Old Post Redoubt troops into the rugged terrain of southwestern Indian Territory.

The geology of Oklahoma elevation features an area reconnaissance potentially revealing the disturbance of the prairie by American Indian horse herds and bison hunting. The disquietude of the plains territory is reciprocative to the Oklahoma red beds and the shortgrass prairie of the Apache, Comanche, and Kiowa lands within Southwestern Oklahoma.

== Native raids on southern prairie plains ==
Signal Mountain on Fort Sill West Range

The stone lookout station was decisively undisputed at the Fort Sill outpost after Sheridan's campaign during the winter of 1868 to 1869 and the realization of cultural assimilation of Native Americans.

The 1870s were seasons of significant transformation in light of the Buffalo Hunters' War and Red River War. The Native disaccord developed as the United States American Indian laws and policy bewildered the Plains Indians way of life. The transgressions waged in opposition to the American Indian frontier culture culminated into a 1875 United States Supreme Court case known as Lobenstein v. United States, 91 U.S. 324.

During the commencement of 1870s, the Southern Plains tribes organized Native raids on Indian Territory forts and military supply trains exemplifying the prairie plains as treacherous grounds for American frontier expeditions. The Army on the Frontier chartered a defense line of forts throughout Indian Territory and Texas as a deterrence for the safeguard of American pioneer, homesteading, and Territorial evolution of the United States.

=== Camp Supply Conflict of 1870 ===
Comanche and Kiowa conduct a skirmish at Camp Supply on June 11, 1870 in the Indian Territory often referred to as the Cherokee Outlet.

=== Henry Warren Wagon Train of 1871 ===
Comanche and Kiowa conduct a skirmish known as the Warren Wagon Train raid occurring on May 18, 1871 in Young County, Texas. The Texas native raids cultivated into what is known today as the Comanche Wars and Texas–Indian wars.

=== Wyllys Lyman's Wagon Train of 1874 ===
During September 1874, Captain Wyllys Lyman guided a provisions train grouped as thirty-six empty wagons to Camp Supply for the replenishment of supply provisions. The wagon train was to collect provisions at Camp Supply and return to Nelson Miles Headquarters Dugout. The frontier range was located near the Washita River with the North Fork Red River situated approximately 25 miles (40 km) south of the headquarters dugout encampment. On September 9, 1874, Lyman's wagon train commenced the return by prairie trail when the double column train with sixty soldiers encountered a skirmish with tribal bands of Cheyenne, Comanche, and Kiowa consequently regressing into a battle from September 9 to September 14, 1874.

The five day siege is often referred to as the Battle of the Upper Washita River transpiring in the Texas Panhandle within the proximity of Fort Elliott and the east coordinate of Roger Mills County, Oklahoma. The Plains Indians conflict was the third major battle of the Red River War occurring along the Historic Trails of the Southern Great Plains.

== American Indian reverence and North American bison ==
The Bison antiquus was a big game species pursued by the Paleo-Indians during the Common Era or to a greater extent the folsom tradition and Upper Paleolithic period. During the 1990s, the Oklahoma Archeological Survey conducted a field survey within the northwest sector of the state of Oklahoma factually substantiating by radiocarbon dating the perception of the great bison belt, Peopling of the Americas, and precontact Oklahoma. The archaeological site located near the vicinity of Fort Supply, Oklahoma became known as the Cooper Bison Kill Site.

During the last quarter of the nineteenth century, the North American bison was aggressively hunted by frontiersmen and ridgerunners destructively devastating the population of the prairie plains bison. The North American fur trade and westward expansion of the American railroad fostered the decimation of the Great Plains bison. The Great Plains First Nations trading networks allured the lucrative commerce and trade of the bison bone and buffalo robe economics. The accretion, commerce, and trade of the bison remains flourished from 1870 to 1937.

The Buffalo rifle, including the Remington Rolling Block rifle, Springfield model 1873, Sharps rifle, and Winchester model 1876, was a prized provision on the Great Plains from 1870 to 1890.

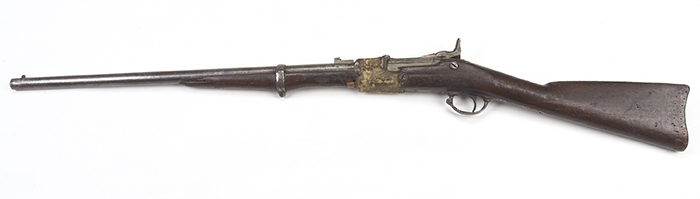
Custer Era Springfield U.S. Model .50 caliber trapdoor carbine ca. 1875

== Listing on National Register of Historic Places ==
Blockhouse on Signal Mountain was listed on the National Register of Historic Places with the National Park Service on November 29, 1978.

== See also ==
- George Armstrong Custer
- George B. Davis
- Richard Henry Pratt
- Benjamin Grierson
- Hugh L. Scott
- William Babcock Hazen
- Philip Sheridan
- Ranald S. Mackenzie
- Joshua W. Sill
- Southern frontier forts of Indian Territory
  - Fort Arbuckle
  - Fort Cobb
  - Fort McCulloch
  - Fort Sill's Old Post Guard House
  - Fort Washita
- Exploratory prairie routes of Indian Territory
  - California Road
  - Dodge-Leavenworth Expedition of 1834
  - Josiah Gregg
  - Jean-Baptiste Bénard de la Harpe
- Indian Peace Commission and Southern Plains Tribal Agency
  - Indian agent
  - James M. Haworth
  - Indian Peace Commission
  - Lawrie Tatum
- Preservation of American bison
  - American Bison Society
  - Charles "Buffalo" Jones
  - Conservation of American bison
  - Ernest Harold Baynes
  - William Temple Hornaday

== Bibliography ==
Further reading about American Frontier and Plains Prairies
- Gregg, Josiah (1855). Commerce of the Prairies. Philadelphia, Pennsylvania: J.W. Moore. LCCN 05037595. OCLC 15470464 – via Internet Archive.
- Custer, George Armstrong (1874). My Life on the Plains: Or, Personal Experiences with Indians (★Librivox Audiobook★). New York, N.Y.: Sheldon and Company. LCCN 01016759. OCLC 2451821 – via Internet Archive.
- Allen, Joel Asaph (1876). American Bisons, Living and Extinct [Memoirs of the Museum of Comparative Zoology at Harvard College]. Vol. IV. Cambridge, Massachusetts: University Press, Cambridge: Welch, Bigelow, & Co. ISBN 0405057016. LCCN 73017790. OCLC 6578281 – via Internet Archive.
- Dodge, Richard Irving; Blackmore, William (1877). The Hunting Grounds of the Great West: a Description of the Plains, Game, and Indians of the Great North American Desert. London, U.K.: Chatto & Windus. LCCN 41031883. OCLC 3386087 – via Internet Archive.
- Custer, Elizabeth Bacon (1885). Boots and Saddles: or, Life in Dakota with General Custer (★Librivox Audiobook★). New York, N.Y.: Harper & Brothers. LCCN 04022950. OCLC 213519450 – via Internet Archive.
- United States War Department (1886). "Lieutenant General of the Army ~ Apache Campaign" [Annual Report of the Secretary of War 1886 ~ Volume 1]. HathiTrust Digital Library. Washington, D.C.: United States Government Office. pp. 143–146.
- Welsh, Herbert (1887). "The Apache Prisoners in Fort Marion, St. Augustine, Florida". Internet Archive. Philadelphia, Pennsylvania: Office of the Indian Rights Association. OCLC 61141514.
- Hornaday, William Temple (1889). The Extermination of the American Bison : with a Sketch of Its Discovery and Life History. Washington, D.C.: United States Government Printing Office. OCLC 38907610 – via Internet Archive.
- Brown, John Henry (1890). "Indian Wars and Pioneers of Texas". Internet Archive. Austin, Texas: L.E. Daniell. LCCN 03014078. OCLC 1342204122.
- Wilbarger, John Wesley (1890). Colonel Jack Hays [Indian Depredations in Texas: Reliable Accounts of Battles, Wars, Adventures, Forays, Murders, Massacres, etc.]. Austin, Texas: Hutchings Printing House. pp. 71–79. OCLC 2694641.
- Baird, George W. (1891). "The Capture of Geronimo's Apaches" [General Miles's Indian Campaigns on the Staked Plains]. HathiTrust Digital Library. The Century Magazine. New York, N.Y.: Century Co. pp. 367–369, 351–370. hdl:2027/mdp.39015007006300. OCLC 183354486.
- Mooney, James (1898). "Calendar History of the Kiowa Indians" [Winter 1877-78 ~ K' op-taide-do-tsedal-de Sai, “Signal-mountain winter” “the mountain with a house built upon it”]. Internet Archive. Ankopaaingyadete. Washington, D.C.: U.S. Government Printing Office. p. 342. OCLC 963677.
- Clark, Blue. "Lone Wolf v. Hitchcock (1903)" [U.S. Supreme Court Decision ▷ 187 U.S. 553, 1903 ◁ ~ American Indians detribalization with U.S. law in the forefront given adaption to American society and challenges of assimilation]. The Encyclopedia of Oklahoma History and Culture. Oklahoma Historical Society.
- Cook, John R. (1907). The Border and the Buffalo : an Untold Story of the Southwest Plains. Topeka, Kansas: Crane and Company. LCCN 12002506. OCLC 10334692 – via Internet Archive.
- Crittenden, H.L. (October 31, 1907). "An Unknown Grave ~ Lawton, Okla., Oct. 21". Mangum Sun-Monitor (Newspaper). Vol. 17, no. 46 (1 ed.). Mangum, Oklahoma: Oklahoma Historical Society. p. 2. LCCN sn96087866. OCLC 34975177.
- Custer, Elizabeth Bacon (1928). "Letter from Elizabeth Custer to Dr. C. C. Rister, July 28, 1928" [Letter from Elizabeth Custer to Dr. C. C. Rister, discussing General George Armstrong Custer's attitude and interactions with the Native Americans]. University of North Texas Libraries ~ The Portal to Texas History. Hardin-Simmons University Library.
- Rister, Carl Coke (1929). "The Significance of the Destruction of the Buffalo in the Southwest". Southwestern Historical Quarterly. 33 (1). Texas State Historical Association: 34–49. JSTOR 30237207.
- Hume, C. Ross (1938). "Historic Sites Around Anadarko". The Chronicles of Oklahoma. 16 (4 - December 1938). Oklahoma Historical Society: 410–424. LCCN 23027299. OCLC 655582328.
- Foreman, Grant (1941). "Historical Background of the Kiowa Comanche Reservation". The Chronicles of Oklahoma. 19 (2 - June 1941). Oklahoma Historical Society: 129–140. LCCN 23027299. OCLC 655582328.
- Schmitt, Karl (1950). "Wichita-Kiowa Relations and the 1874 Outbreak". The Chronicles of Oklahoma. 28 (2 - Summer 1950). Oklahoma Historical Society: 154–160. LCCN 23027299. OCLC 655582328.
- Mitchell, Sara Brown (1950). "The Early Days of Anadarko". The Chronicles of Oklahoma. 28 (4 - Winter 1950). Oklahoma Historical Society: 390–398. LCCN 23027299. OCLC 655582328.
- Roe, Frank Gilbert (1951). The North American Buffalo; a Critical Study of the Species in its Wild State. Toronto, Ontario, Canada: University of Toronto Press. ISBN 978-1487572822. OCLC 1507532.
- Cooper, Charles M. (1957). "The Big Pasture". The Chronicles of Oklahoma. 35 (2 - Summer, 1957). Oklahoma Historical Society: 138–146. LCCN 23027299. OCLC 655582328.
- Griswold, Gillett (1958). "Old Fort Sill: The First Seven Years". The Chronicles of Oklahoma. 36 (1 - Spring, 1958). Oklahoma Historical Society: 2–14. LCCN 23027299. OCLC 655582328.
- Johze, Benedick (1961). "A Brief History of the Fort Sill Apache Tribe". The Chronicles of Oklahoma. 39 (4 - Winter 1961-62). Oklahoma Historical Society: 427–432. LCCN 23027299. OCLC 655582328.
- Monahan, Forrest D. (1967). "The Kiowa-Comanche Reservation" [The Kiowa-Comanche Reservation in the 1890's]. The Chronicles of Oklahoma. 45 (4 - Winter 1967-68). Oklahoma Historical Society: 451–463. LCCN 23027299. OCLC 655582328.
- Nye, Wilbur Sturtevant (1969). Carbine and Lance: The Story of Old Fort Sill. Norman, Oklahoma: University of Oklahoma Press. ISBN 978-0806187181. LCCN 79013137. OCLC 778993468.
- Kalisch, Philip A.; Kalisch, Beatrice J. (1972). "Indian Territory Forts, 1839-1865" [Indian Territory Forts: Charnel Houses of the Frontier, 1839-1865]. The Chronicles of Oklahoma. 50 (1 - Spring 1972). Oklahoma Historical Society: 65–81. LCCN 23027299. OCLC 655582328.
- Fischer, LeRoy H. (1975). "Oklahoma Territory, 1890-1907". The Chronicles of Oklahoma. 53 (1 - Spring 1975). Oklahoma Historical Society: 3–8. LCCN 23027299. OCLC 655582328.
- Turcheneske, Jr., John Anthony (1976). "The United States Congress and the Release of the Apache Prisoners of War at Fort Sill". The Chronicles of Oklahoma. 54 (2 - Summer 1976). Oklahoma Historical Society: 199–226. LCCN 23027299. OCLC 655582328.
- Faulk, Odie B.; Franks, Kenny Arthur; Lambert, Paul F. (1978). Early Military Forts and Posts in Oklahoma. Gateway to Oklahoma History. Oklahoma City, Oklahoma: Oklahoma Historical Society. ISBN 978-0941498081. LCCN 78-70038. OCLC 982028838.
- Barnett, LeRoy (1979). "The Buffalo Bone Commerce on the Northern Plains" (PDF). SHSND Publications. State Historical Society of North Dakota.
- Haes, Brenda L. (2000). "Fort Sill, the Chiricahua Apaches, and the Government's Promise of Permanent Residence". The Chronicles of Oklahoma. 78 (1 - Spring 2000). Oklahoma Historical Society: 28–43. LCCN 23027299. OCLC 655582328.
- Woolley, Bryan (2004). "The Frontier Forts of Texas". Texas Almanac. Texas State Historical Association.
- Beemer, Rod (2012). "Custer's Last Campaign of Sheridan's 1868-69 Winter Offensive". The Chronicles of Oklahoma. 90 (4 - Winter 2012-13). Oklahoma Historical Society: 440–461. LCCN 23027299. OCLC 655582328.
- Boissoneault, Lorraine (October 23, 2017). "How the 1867 Medicine Lodge Treaty Changed the Plains Indian Tribes Forever". Smithsonian Magazine History. Smithsonian Institution.
- Megehee, Mark K. (2018). Fort Sill ~ Images of America. Charleston, South Carolina: Arcadia Publishing. ISBN 978-1467129640. OCLC 1079066884.

== Video media archive ==
- "17164 The Signal Corps Basic Signal Communication ~ Field Wire Line Construction". United States Department of War. Internet Archive. The Signal Corps. 1941.
- Fort Sill National Historic Landmark and Museum on YouTube

American Indians of Southwestern Oklahoma

- Indians of Oklahoma: Exposition in Anadarko, Oklahoma c. 1950 on YouTube
- American Indian Dances at Indian City USA Circa 1950s on YouTube
- Anadarko Indian Exposition Parade: Late 1940s Early 1950s on YouTube
- Native American Missions in Oklahoma - 1932 on YouTube
- Oklahoma Indians: We Are Who We Were on YouTube
- Oklahoma: A Past Preserved - 1975 on YouTube

American Bison and Preservation of Great Plains Species

- A Celebration of Heritage: Native Americans - Bison & the Great Plains on YouTube
- "American Buffalo : Spirit of a Nation". Internet Archive. New York, N.Y.: Thirteen/WNET. 1998. OCLC 42243992.
- Facing the Storm: Story of the American Bison on YouTube
- Hunting Buffalo (1910) on YouTube
- People of the Bison on YouTube
- Return of the American Bison on YouTube
- The American Buffalo ~ Ken Burns & PBS playlist on YouTube
