= Ketch Ranch House (Oklahoma) =

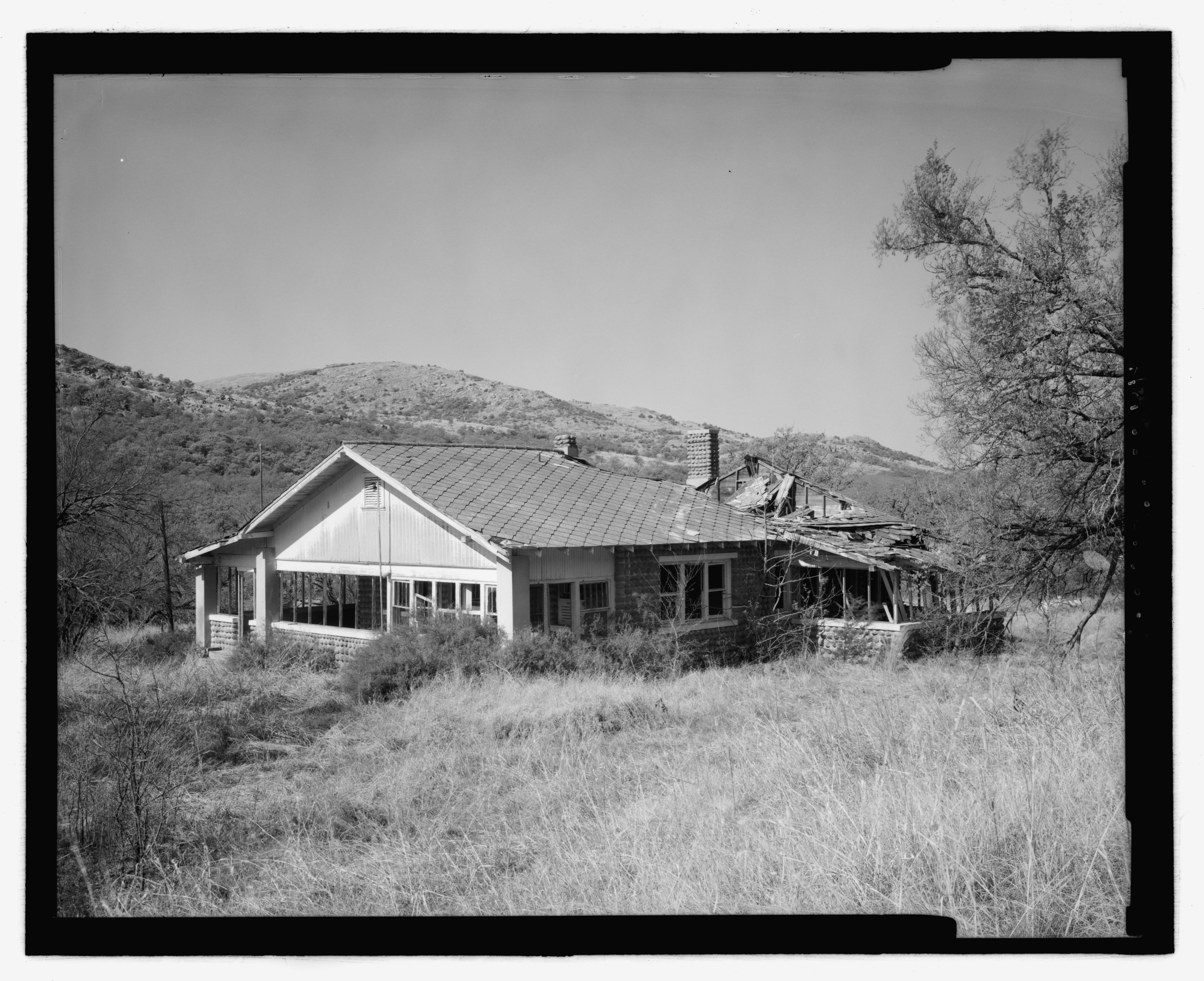
- Alternative names: Circle K Ranch (1929); Monte Vista Ranch (1932)

General information
- Type: Bungalow
- Architectural style: American Craftsman; American foursquare
- Location: Comanche County, Oklahoma; Fort Sill Military Reservation, Running Deer Camp Road, Medicine Park, Oklahoma, United States of America
- Coordinates: 34.7048714°N 98.5728528°W
- Groundbreaking: May 1923
- Completed: 1924
- Cost: $4500.00
- Owner: Ada May Ketch; Frank Levant Ketch

Height
- Roof: Shingle

Technical details
- Material: Cobblestone
- Floor count: One
- Floor area: 2,146 square feet (199.4 m^{2})
- Grounds: 5,145 acres (2,082 ha)

Design and construction
- Known for: Cobblestone architecture

Other information
- Number of rooms: Six

Ketch Ranch House or Ketch Ranch was private property located in the Wichita Mountains of Southwestern Oklahoma. During the early 1920s, the forest reserve residence was established as a working ranch and vacation home for Ada May Ketch and Frank Levant Ketch who served as mayor of Ringling, Oklahoma.

The Wichita Mountains ranch offered a barn, guest house, smokehouse, springhouse, root cellar, and the vital rural house structure located near Blue Beaver Valley Road. The nature reserve residence provided outdoor experiences with hiking, horseback riding, boating, and fishing at Ketch Lake which was close proximity being 1 mile (1.6 km) west of the Ketch Ranch House.

Ada May Ketch purchased the Wichita Mountain acreage on May 8, 1923, from S.P. Thornhill through the property holdings of First National Bank of Lawton. The Ketch Ranch was developed during the economic prosperity years of the Roaring Twenties which simultaneously encompassed the creation of Oklahoma Senator Elmer Thomas's River Rock Resort better known as Medicine Park, Oklahoma.

By 1932, the Ketch Ranch estate was affected by the Wall Street Crash of 1929. In 1934, the estate was sold on a joint extension agreement to the Monte Vista Ranch enterprise whereas the Ketch family retained the Wichita Mountains reserve residence.

On January 10, 1941, the United States government acquired the Monte Vista Ranch property through the provisions of Declaration of Taking Act and United States Constitution Fifth Amendment. The United States congressional legislation authorized the land expansion of the Fort Sill Military Reservation while protecting the United States national security given the ascension of the Axis powers of 1930s and the commencement of World War II.

== Case Law and Jake L. Hamon, Sr. Estate ==
Frank Ketch served as the business administrator for the Jake L. Hamon Sr. estate. Jake Hamon Sr. was a prominent committee member of the Republican Party where Warren Harding had appealed for Mr. Hamon to accompany his presidential cabinet as the next United States Secretary of the Interior.

Mr. Hamon governed a diverse portfolio of holdings and ownership in oil and gas lease properties geographically apportioned in South Central Oklahoma. The petroleum assets were devised in the crude oil fields of Healdton, Oklahoma and Hewitt, Oklahoma.

By 1920, Jake L. Hamon Properties had invested in the Breckenridge oilfields of Stephens County, a region of North Texas that is an example of the 1920s Texas oil boom and interwar period.

During 1921, the Jake L. Hamon investments were appraised at three million U.S. dollars considering a brief eight-year period of time after discovering a prosperous 1914 blowout in the Healdton oilfield.

Judicial Proceedings of Jake L. Hamon, Sr. Estate

Text of Hamon v. State, 67 Okla. 128, (Supreme Court of Oklahoma 1917) is available from: Justia Casetext
Text of Oklahoma v. Texas, 259 U.S. 565, (United States Supreme Court 1922) is available from: CourtListener Internet Archive (docket files) Justia Casemine
Text of Hamon v. Keyes, 99 Okla. 19, (Supreme Court of Oklahoma 1924) is available from: Justia Casetext
Text of Ketch v. Weaver Bros, 261 S.W. 380, (Texas Appeals 1924) is available from: CourtListener Casetext Casemine
Text of Ketch v. Cox, 105 Okla. 283, (Supreme Court of Oklahoma 1925) is available from: CourtListener Justia Casemine
Text of Apple v. Given, 117 Okla. 79, (Supreme Court of Oklahoma 1925) is available from: CourtListener Justia Casemine
Text of Apple v. Hert, 122 Okla. 153, (Supreme Court of Oklahoma 1927) is available from: Justia
Text of Apple v. McCain, 127 Okla. 147, (Supreme Court of Oklahoma 1927) is available from: Justia
Text of Ketch v. Smith, 131 Okla. 263, (Supreme Court of Oklahoma 1928) is available from: Justia

== Gallery ==
Ketch Ranch House ~ Fort Sill Military Reservation

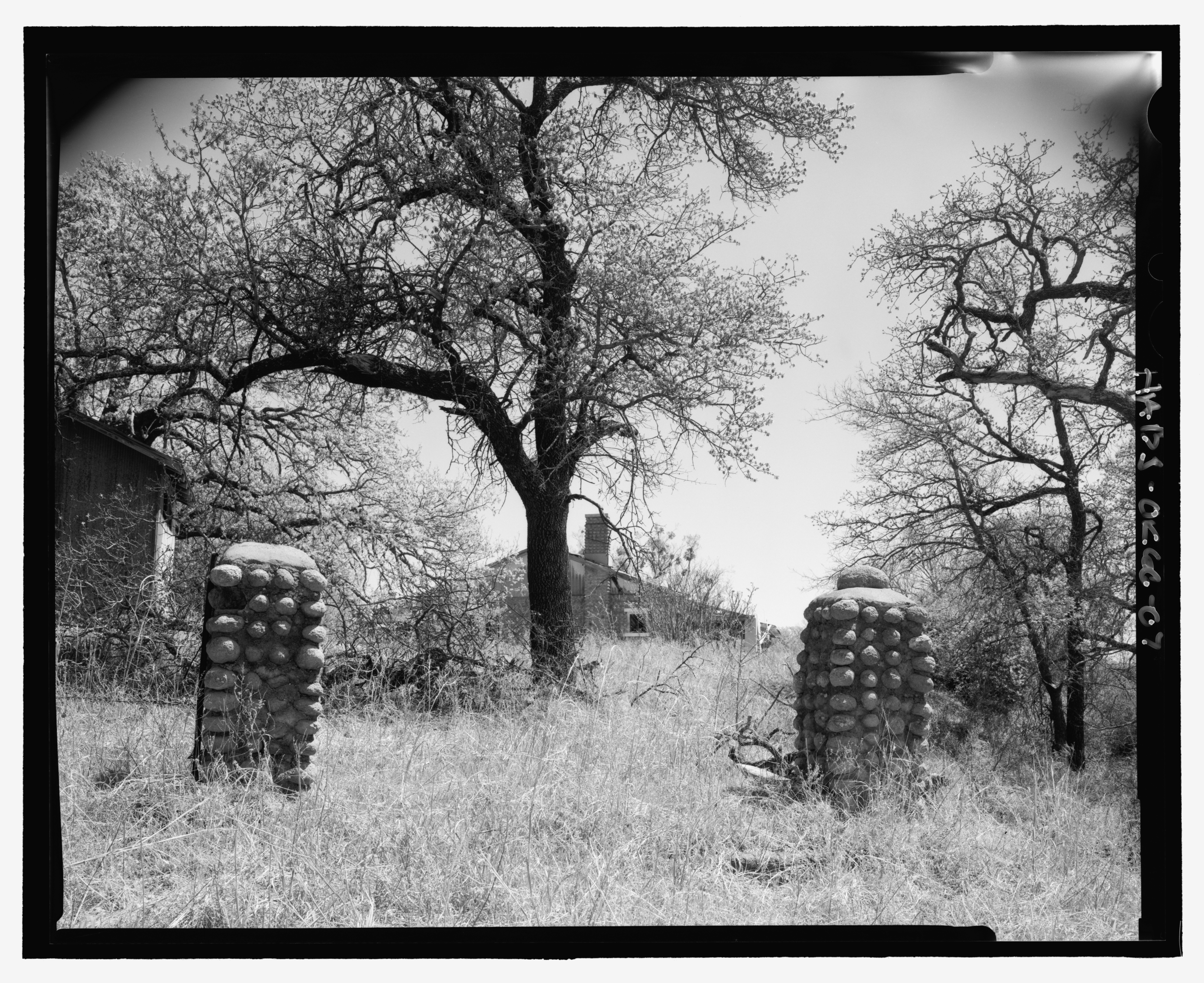
Cobblestone columns at driveway entrance

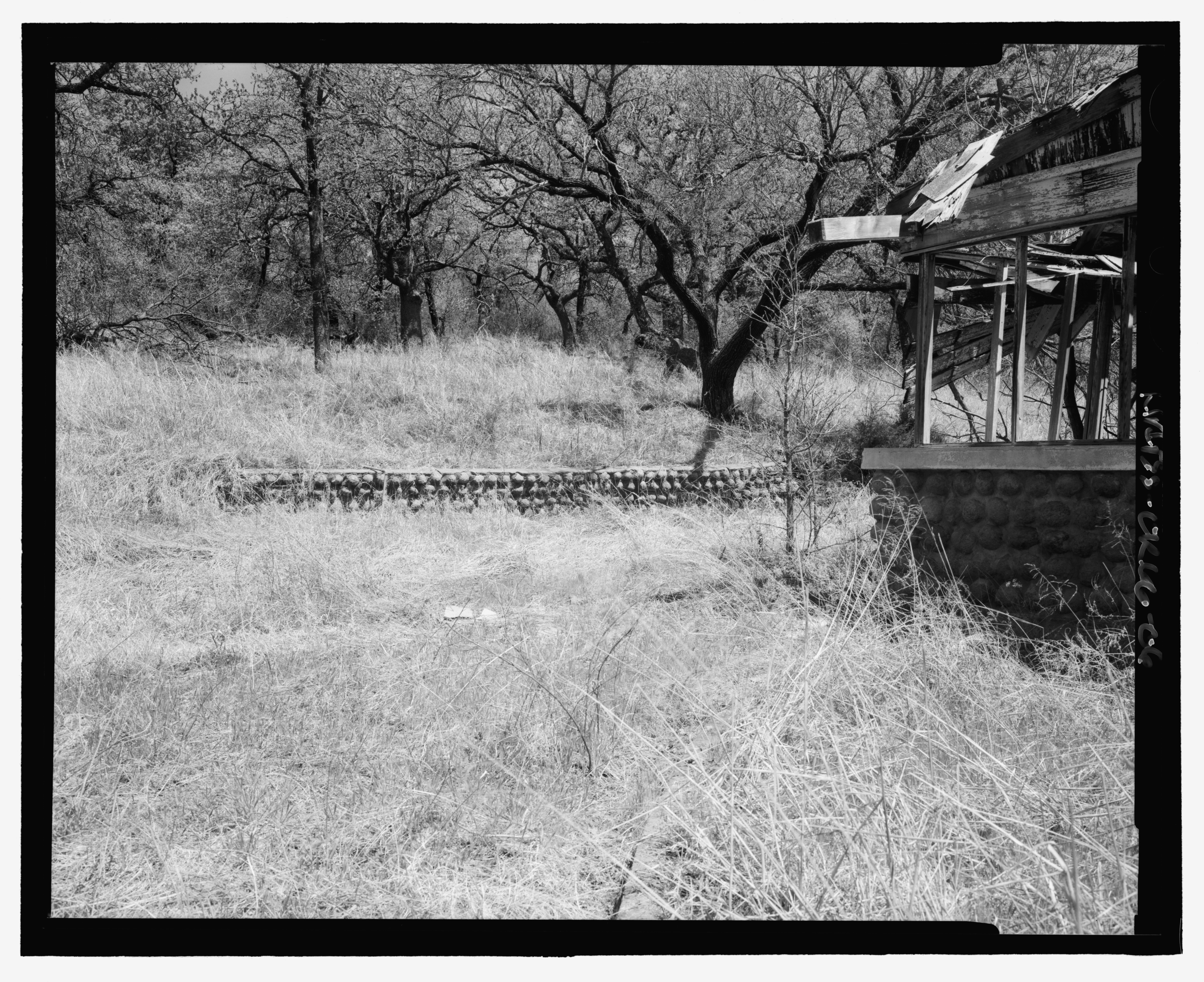
Cobblestone retaining wall at driveway entrance

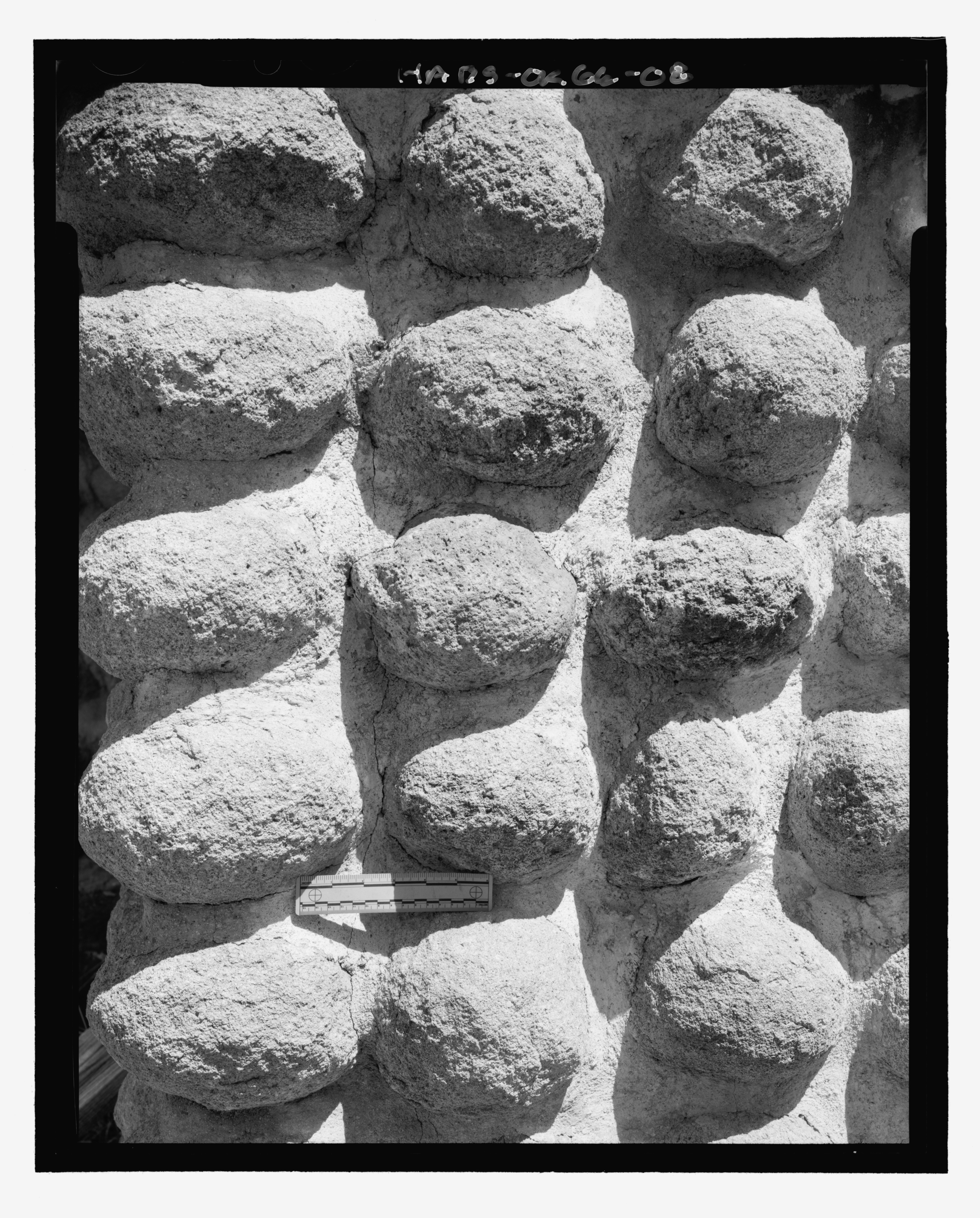
Cobblestone architecture detail of Ketch Ranch House

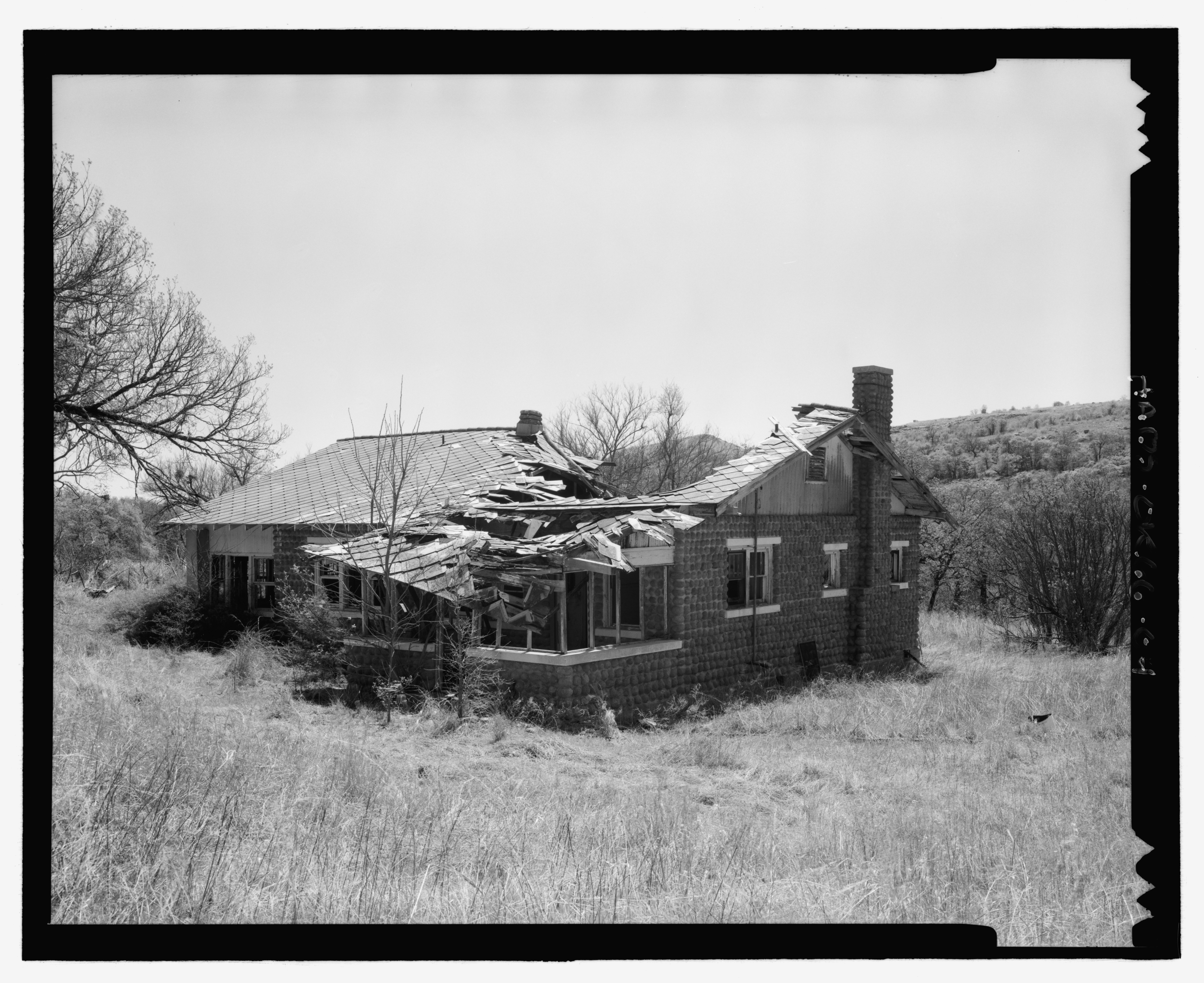
Ketch Ranch House exterior structure near Medicine Park

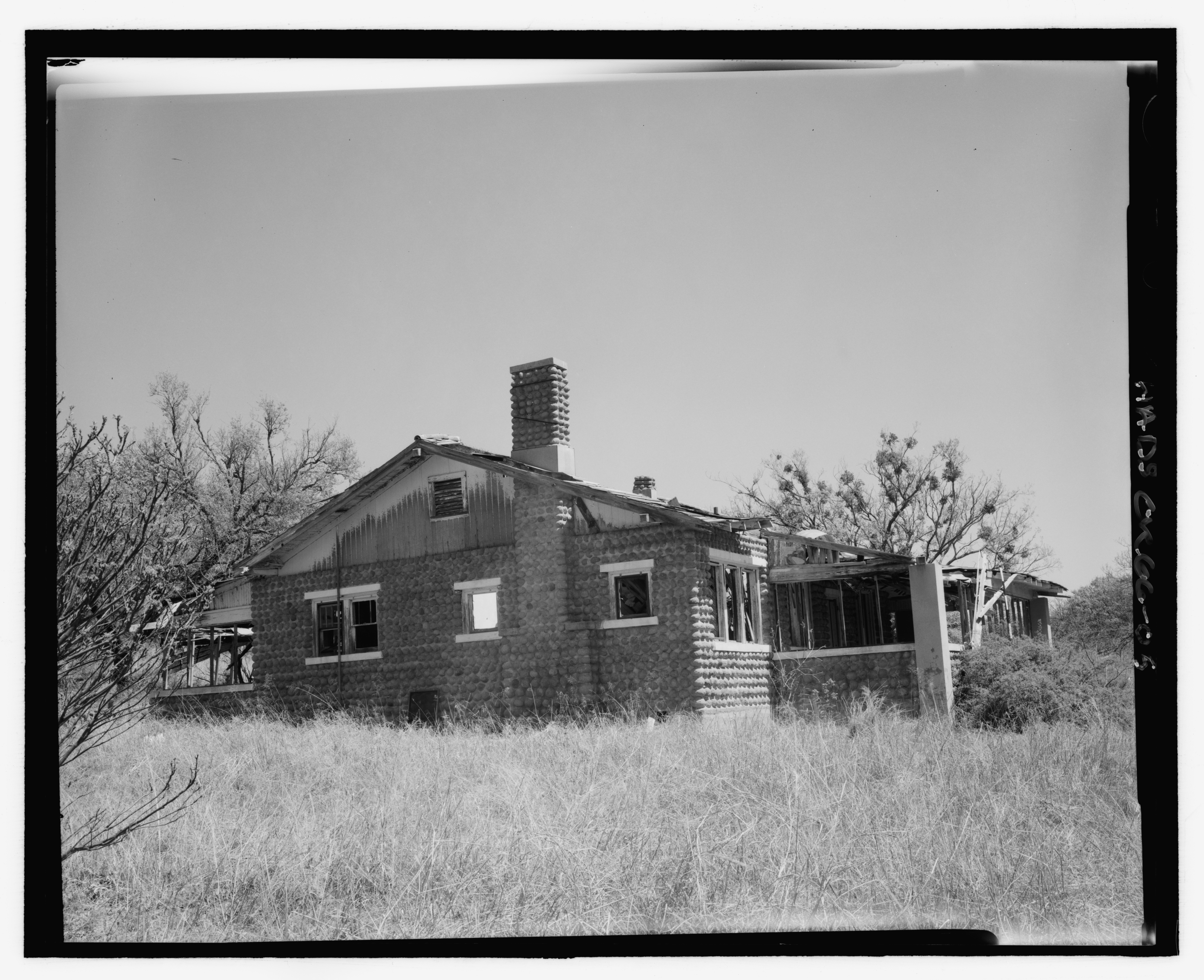
Ketch Ranch House exterior structure near Medicine Park

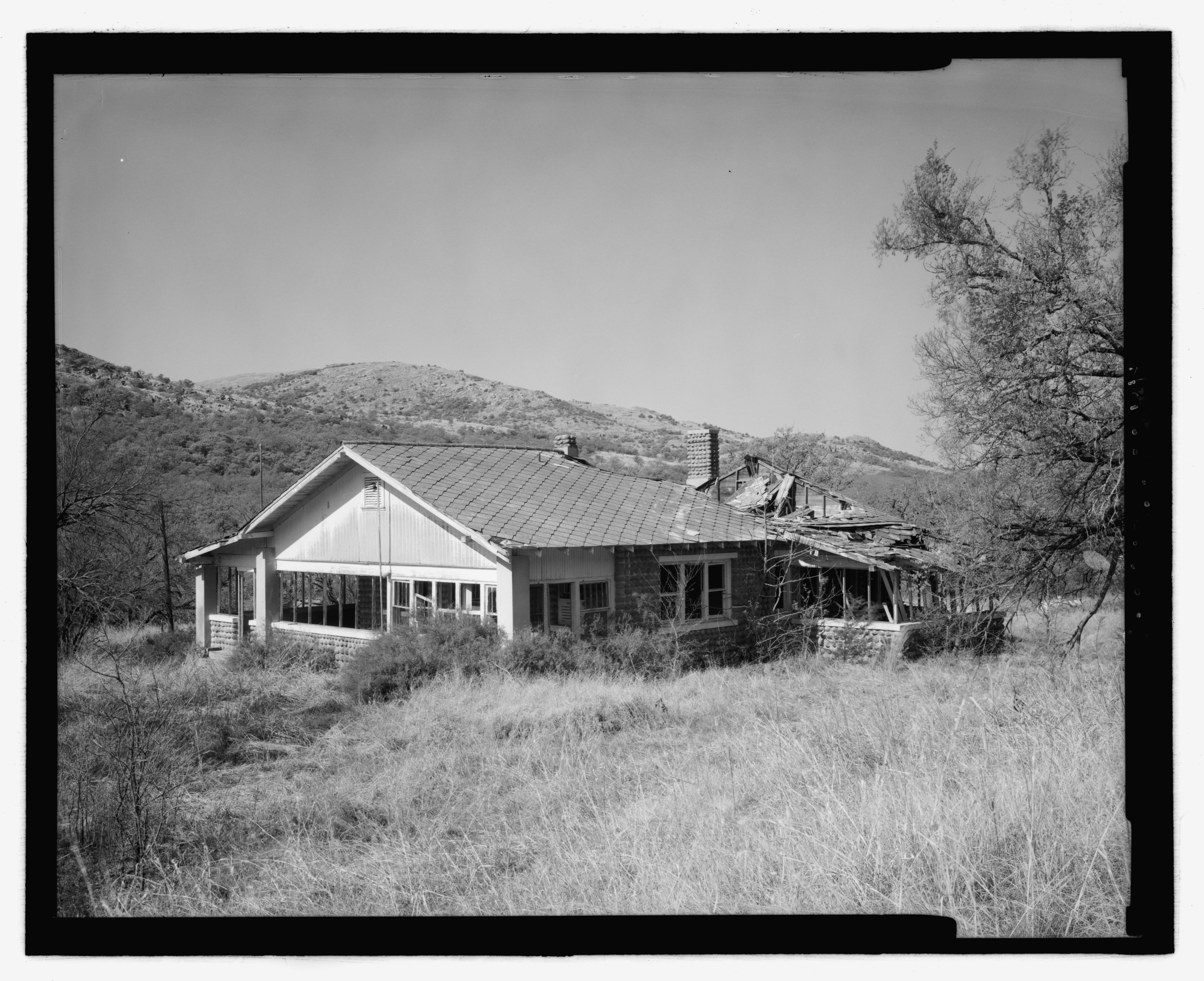
Ketch Ranch House exterior structure near Medicine Park

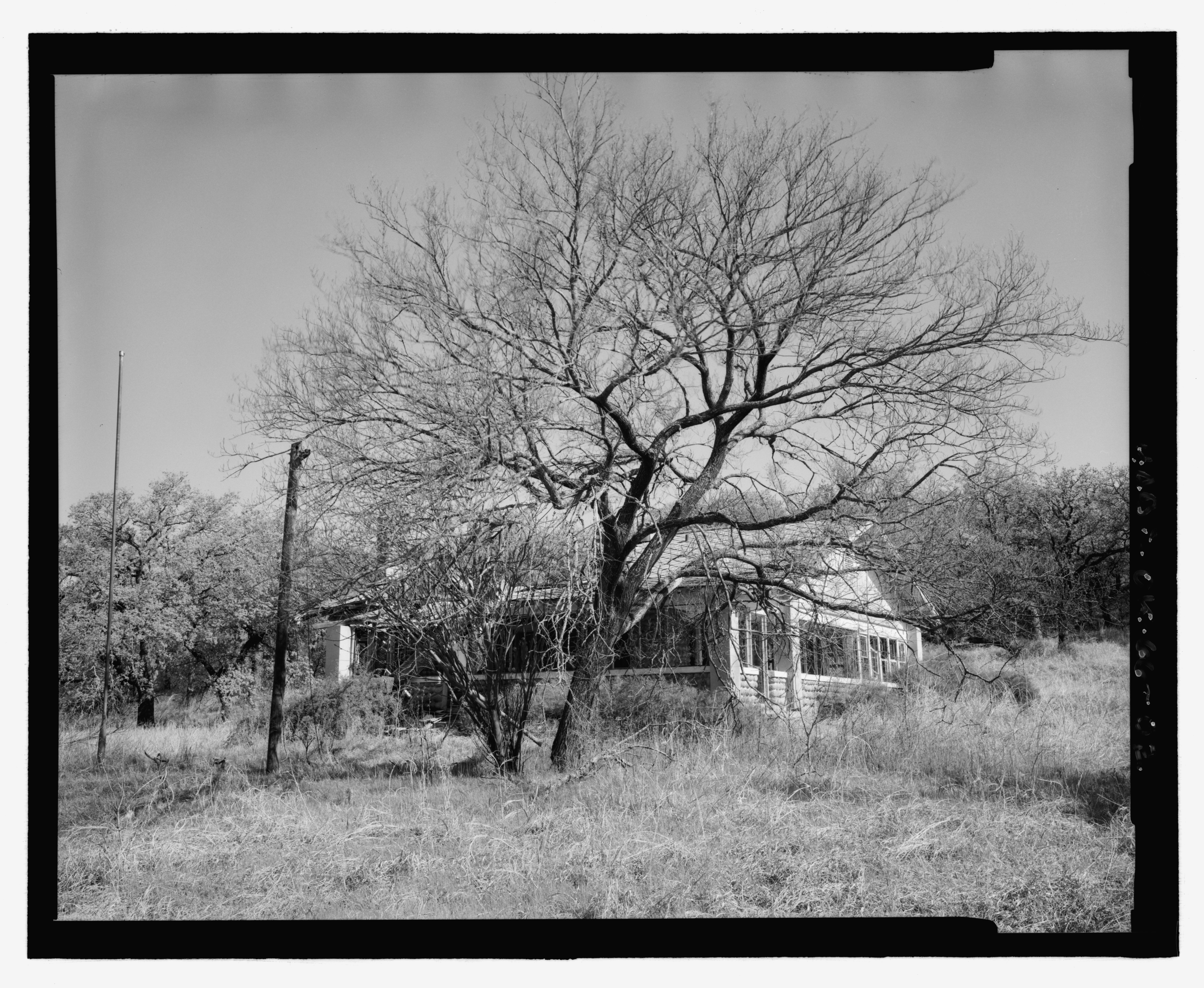
Ketch Ranch House exterior structure near Medicine Park

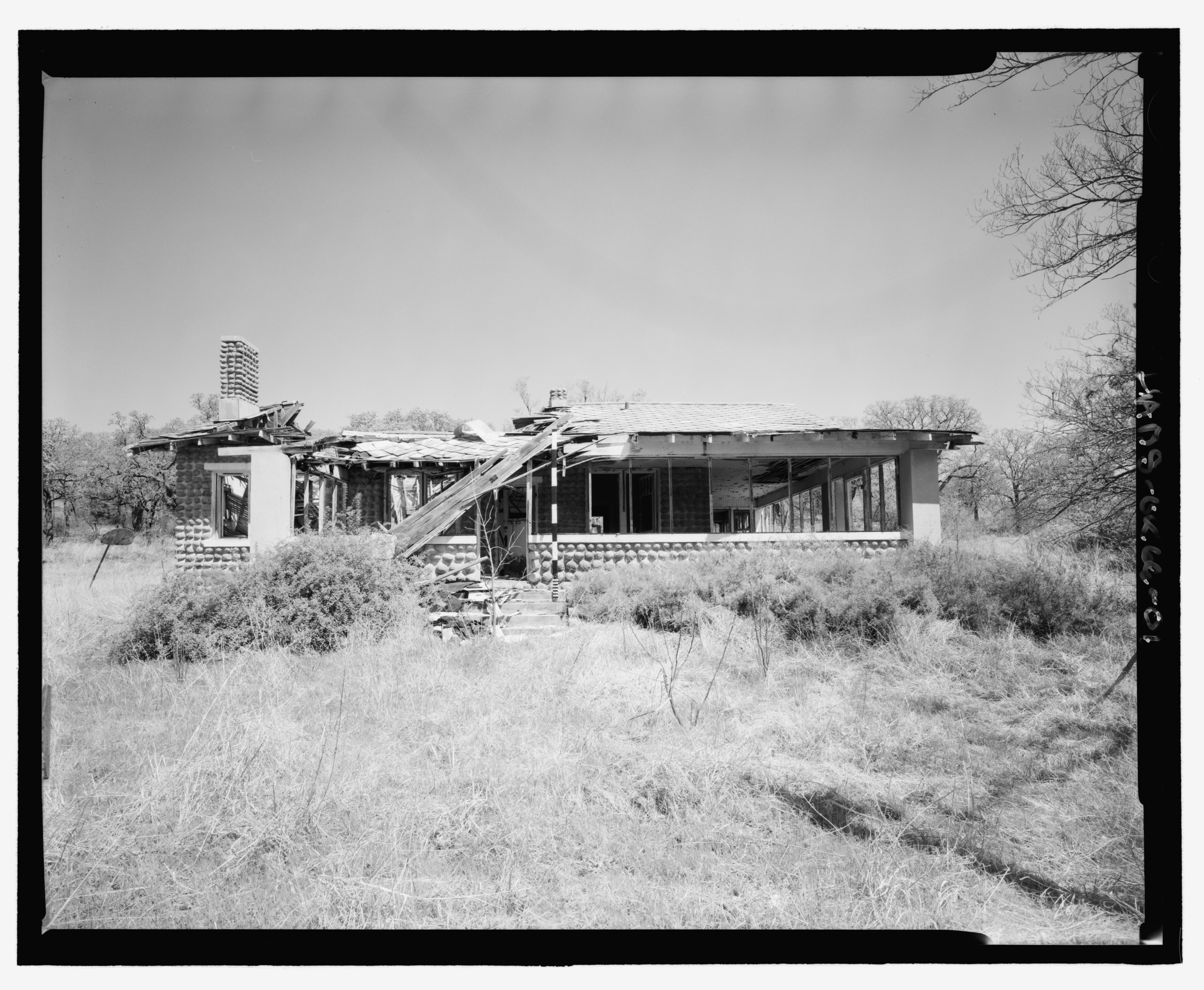
Ketch Ranch House exterior structure near Medicine Park

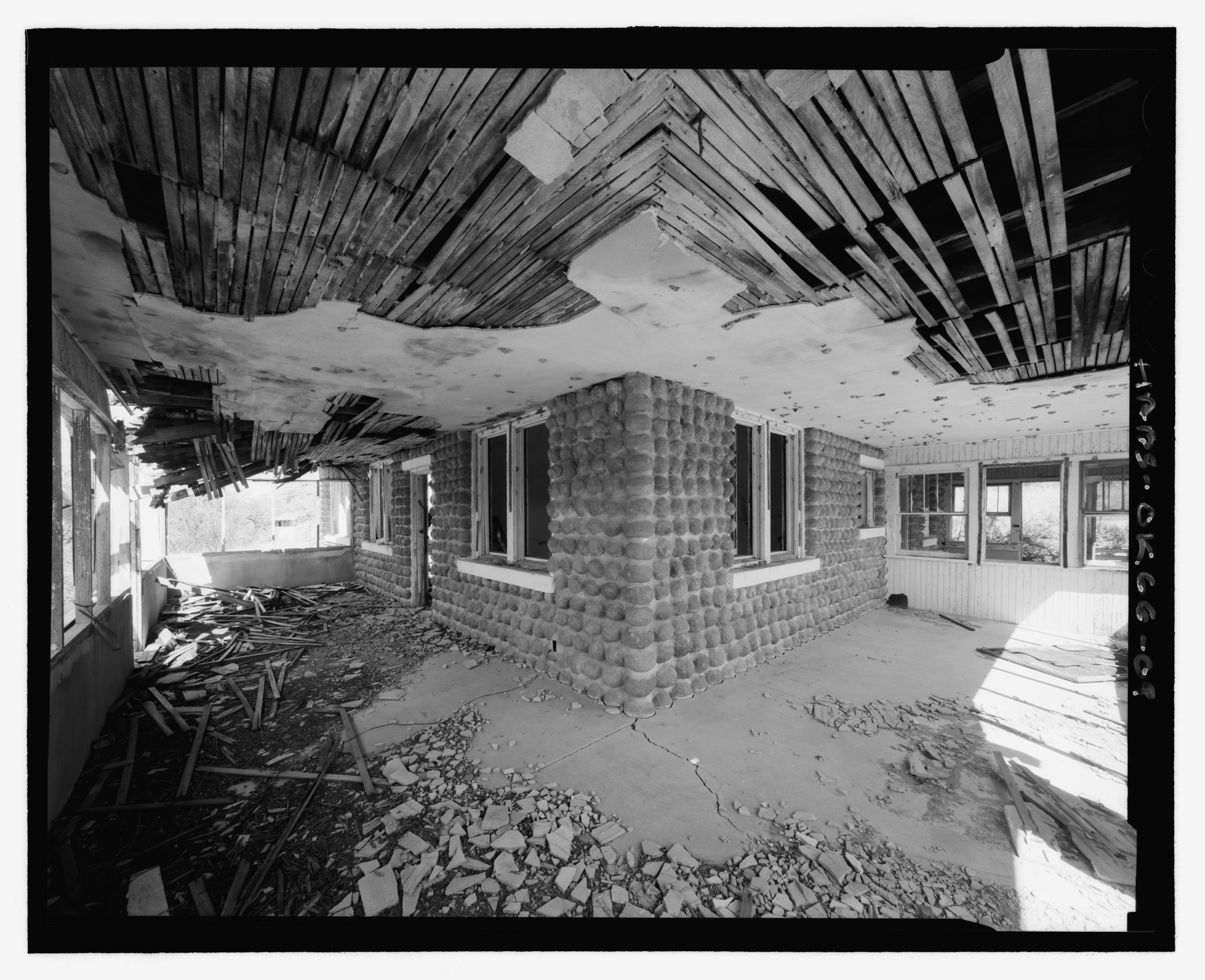
Ketch Ranch House exterior of front porch structure

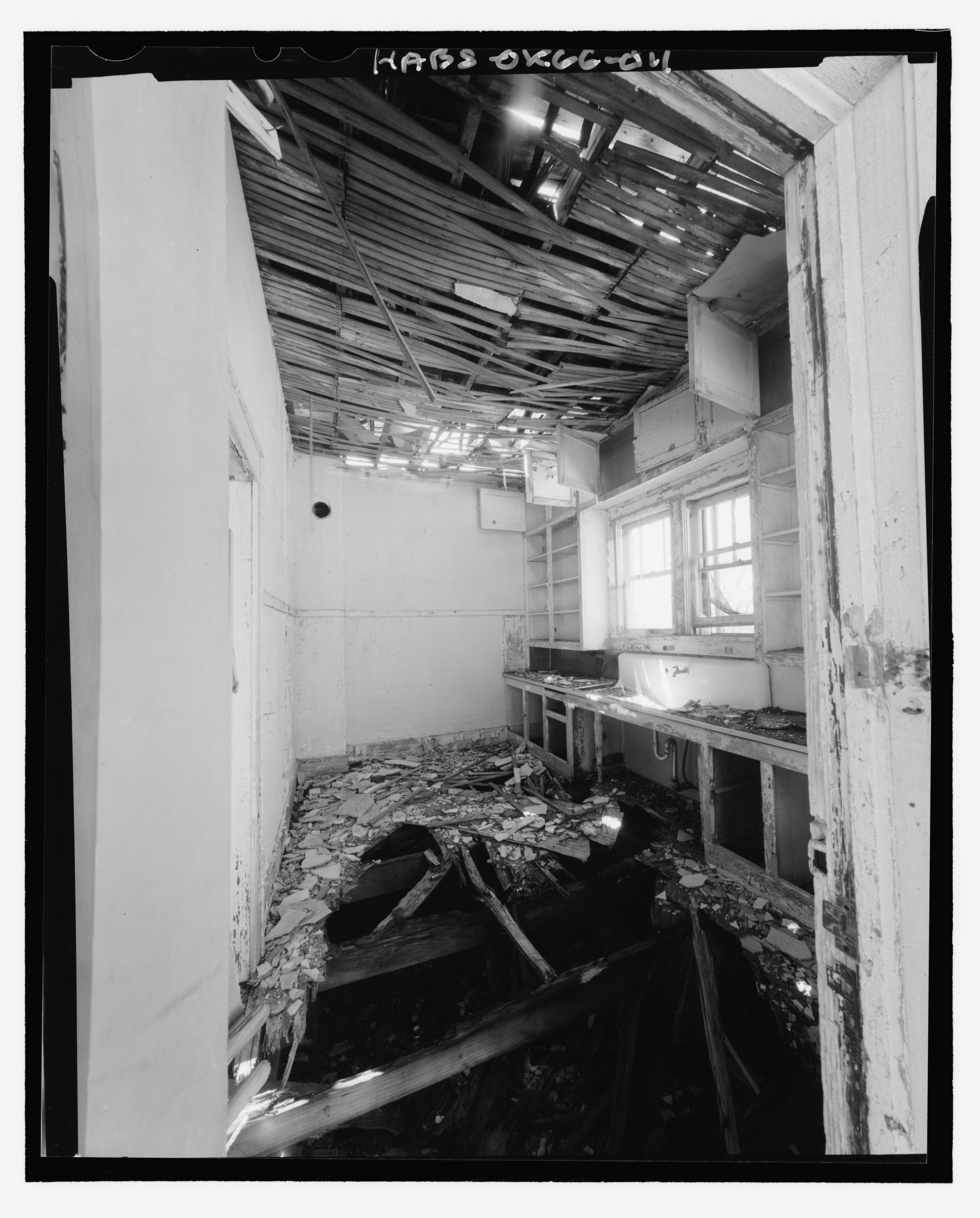
Ketch Ranch House interior of kitchen area

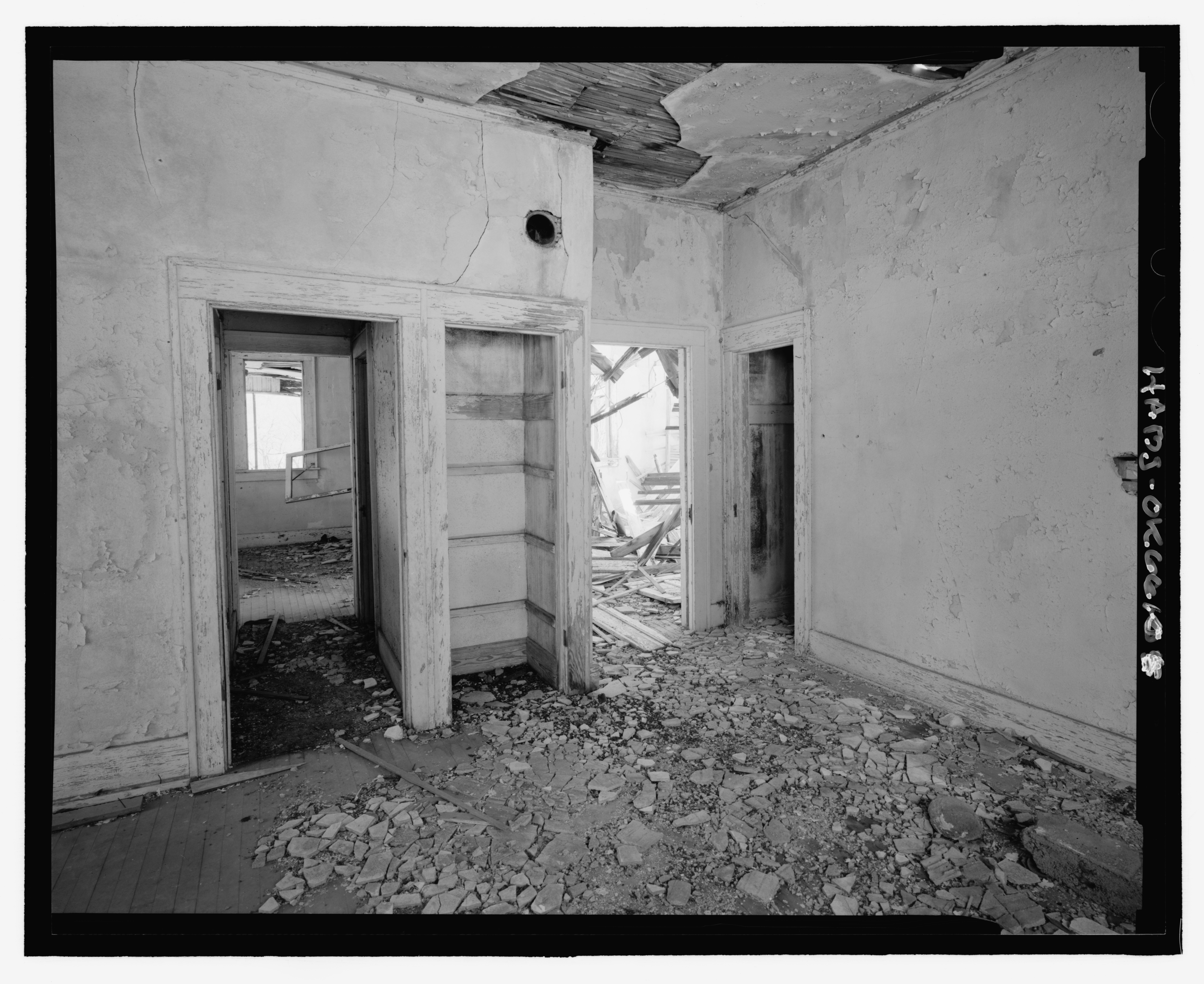
Ketch Ranch House interior of bedroom area

== Native American culture of Wichita Mountains ==
The Ketch Ranch estate was established approximately 3.75 miles (6.04 km) northeast of Craterville Park, Oklahoma. Craterville Park was established after the Kiowa-Comanche-Apache land openings coinciding with Oklahoma statehood as confirmed on November 16, 1907.

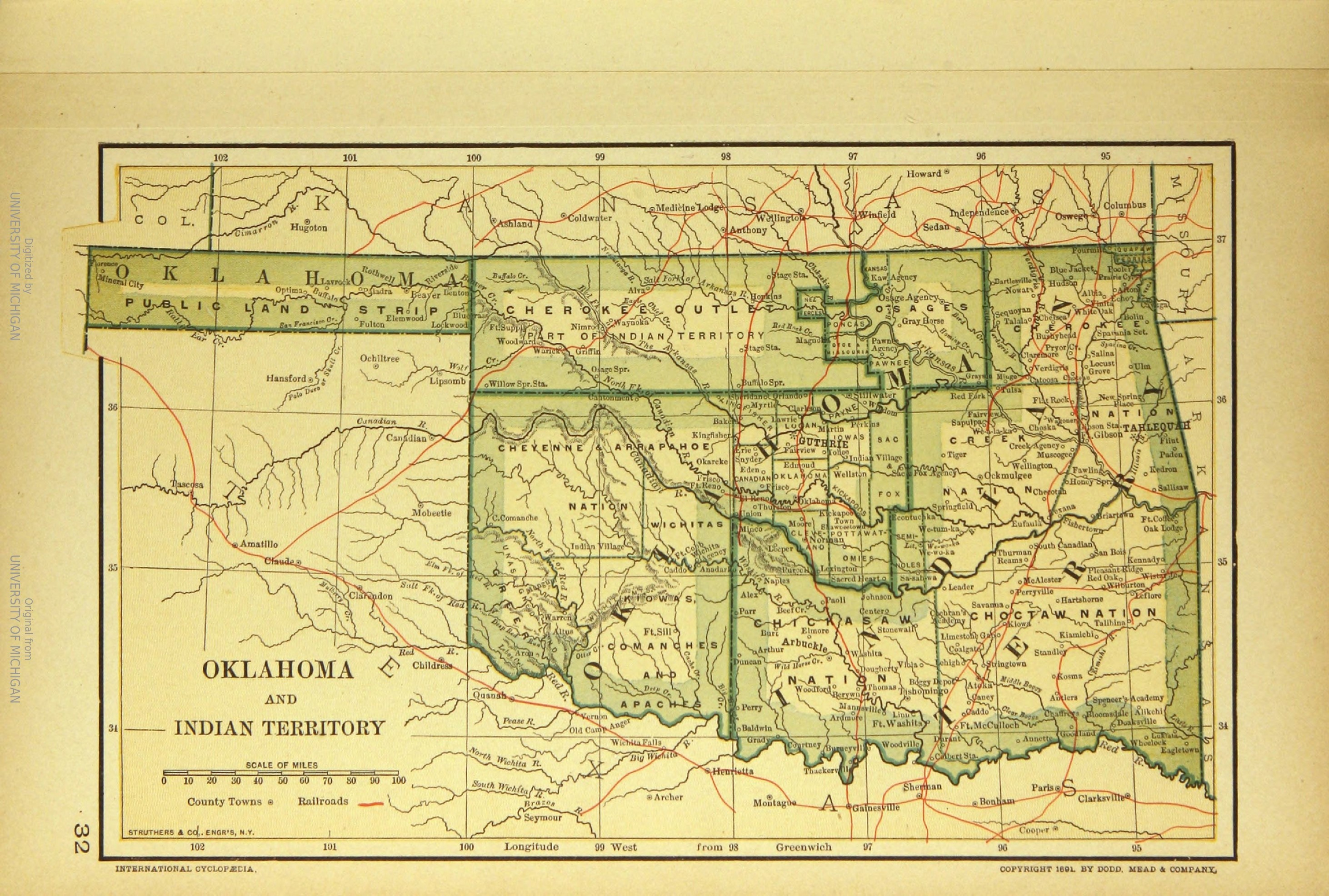
1894 Indian Territories & Oklahoma Map

In 1907, cowboy naturalist Frank Rush, a native of Blackburn, Oklahoma, served as the superintendent of the Wichita Forest and Game Reserve. Mr. Rush attained local and statewide recognition for the railway transport facilitation and safeguard of the near extinct American bison during October of 1907.

The Plains bison herd was granted to the state of Oklahoma by the Bronx Zoological Gardens and New York Zoological Society. The bison re-establishment substantiated the ecological principles of conservation in the United States while supporting habitat conservation within the nature reserve. The buffalo grazing grounds have a proximity to the Holy City of the Wichitas Historic District built by the Works Progress Administration from 1934 to 1936.

The American bison collection was a species reintroduction to the native lands of the southwest Indian Territory within the Wichita National Forest federal lands during the fourth quarter of the 1907 calendar year.

In 1924, the Apache, Comanche, and Kiowa vowed to a pledge known as the Craterville Park Covenant with Wichita National Forest Preserve curator Frank Rush. The Wichita Mountains mixed grass prairie served for the local tribal pow wow events during the Craterville Park Indian Fair from 1924 to 1933.

The Craterville Park Covenant

The object of this Fair will be to create self-confidence and to encourage leadership by the Indian for his people, to better his position, and to take his place on terms of equality with other races in the competitive pursuits of every day life, and a desire to accomplish the most possible for himself and his people.

— May 25, 1924 ~ Craterville Park at Wichita Mountains

At the transition of the twentieth century, the Quanah Parker Star House was constructed due north of Cache, Oklahoma geographically being the Fort Sill military installation as modern day. The two story wood frame dwelling was located south of the Quanah Mountain summit with Quanah Creek and West Cache Creek serving as water source being posterior of the rural western ranch house. The Comanche Chief Star House was situated west of Craterville Park and Oklahoma State Highway 115 approximately 2 miles (3.2 km) north of U.S. Route 62 in Oklahoma.

The Southern Plains villagers immeasurable presence cultivated a historical perspective of the tribal culture and tribal sovereignty for the last of the 19th century Plains Indians tribal chiefs. During the final decade of the nineteenth century, the Southwest Oklahoma native tribes began embracing the ceremonial practices of the Native American Church while residing in the Great Plains of Southwestern Oklahoma and the Wichita Mountains.

Locale of Quanah Parker Star House and Craterville Park, Oklahoma

Quanah Parker Star House on Fort Sill West Range (1890)

Craterville Park, Oklahoma on Fort Sill West Range

== See also ==
- Blockhouse on Signal Mountain
- Dust Bowl
- Oklahoma Gold Rush
- Recession of 1920–1921
- Southwestern Power Administration
- The Plow That Broke the Plains
- The Prize: The Epic Quest for Oil, Money, and Power
- Wichita Mountains Wildlife Refuge

== Bibliography ==
- Robinson, Gilbert L. (1937). History of the Healdton Oil Field [History of the Healdton Oil Field ~ A Thesis – Approved for the Department of History]. Gateway to Oklahoma History. Norman, Oklahoma: Oklahoma Historical Society. pp. 1–94. OCLC 26281676.
- Despain, S. Matthew (2000). "For Society's Sake: The Wichita Mountains, Wildlife, and Identity in Oklahoma's Early Environmental History". The Chronicles of Oklahoma. 78 (4 – Winter 2000–01). Oklahoma Historical Society: 388–411. LCCN 23027299. OCLC 655582328.
- Freeman, Elizabeth E. (2009). "Ragtown: Wirt, Oklahoma, and the Healdton Boom". The Chronicles of Oklahoma. 87 (1 – Spring 2009). Oklahoma Historical Society: 34–55. LCCN 23027299. OCLC 655582328.
- Hedglen, Thomas L. "American Indian Exposition". Encyclopedia of Oklahoma History and Culture. Oklahoma Historical Society.
- Amin, Julius A. "Jakehamon, TX". Handbook of Texas Online. Texas State Historical Association.
- Anonymous. "Ranger, Desdemona, and Breckenridge Oilfields". Handbook of Texas Online. Texas State Historical Association.
- Anderson, H. Allen. "Wichita Falls and Southern Railroad". Handbook of Texas Online. Texas State Historical Association.
- Anderson, H. Allen. "Wichita Falls, Ranger, and Fort Worth Railroad". Handbook of Texas Online. Texas State Historical Association.

== Periodical bibliography ==
- "Says Jake Hamon Told Woman to Flee; Clara Smith's Attorneys Assert She First Heard of Death at El Paso". The New York Times. December 25, 1920.
- "Court Recessed at Noon; Mrs. Jake Hamon to Testify". United States Library of Congress. The Daily Ardmoreite. March 13, 1921.
- "Mrs. Hamon and Ketch on Stand in Murder Case". United States Library of Congress. Grand Forks Herald. March 14, 1921.
- "Ketch Declares Hamon Wanted Clara to Leave" [Business Manager of Hamon Interests Relates Conversations]. The Portal to Texas History. Brownwood Bulletin. March 14, 1921.
- "State to Rest Its Case Today". United States Library of Congress. The Morning Tulsa Daily World. March 14, 1921.
- "Hamon's Widow Testifies at Trial". The New York Times. March 15, 1921.
- "Hamon's Widow Seeks Alimony". The Chronicles of Oklahoma. Vol. 20, no. 210. Lawton, Oklahoma: Oklahoma Historical Society. The Lawton News. January 28, 1923.

== Petroleum industry bibliography ==
- "Jake Hamon, Oil Man of Oklahoma, Is Shot". National Petroleum News. XII (47). Cleveland, Ohio: National Petroleum Publishing Company: 32. November 24, 1920.
- "Gunshot Wound Proves Fatal to Jake Hamon". National Petroleum News. XII (48). Cleveland, Ohio: National Petroleum Publishing Company: 36. December 1, 1920.

== Historical video archive ==
Early 20th Century Expansion and Transitory Events
- Early 20th Century Oil Boom in Oklahoma on YouTube
- FDR and The Dust Bowl on YouTube
- The Dust Bowl on YouTube
- The Story of Oklahoma – Dust, Drifters, and Drought on YouTube
- U.S. Dust Bowl on YouTube
- U.S. Dust Bowl on YouTube
- The Century: America's Time – American Broadcasting Company playlist on YouTube
- The American Buffalo – Ken Burns and PBS playlist on YouTube
- The Dust Bowl – Ken Burns and PBS playlist on YouTube
- The Prize: The Epic Quest for Oil, Money & Power – Daniel Yergin playlist on YouTube
