= Condemnation Act =

- Long title: An Act to authorize condemnation of land for sites of public buildings, and for other purposes.
- Nicknames: Condemnation Act of 1888
- Enacted by: the 50th United States Congress
- Effective: August 1, 1888

Citations
- Public law: Pub. L. 50–728
- Statutes at Large: 25 Stat. 357

Codification
- Titles amended: 40 U.S.C.: Public Buildings, Properties, and Public Works
- U.S.C. sections created: 40 U.S.C. ch. 31, subch. II § 3113

Legislative history
- Signed into law by President Grover Cleveland on August 1, 1888

An Act to authorize the condemnation of lands for sites for public buildings, and other purposes (25 Stat. 357), commonly known as the Condemnation Act or the Act of August 1, 1888, is a federal statute adopted by the 50th United States Congress and signed into law on August 1, 1888, which authorizes federal officials to seek eminent domain condemnation of land for the purpose of erecting public buildings. It also gives federal district and appellate courts jurisdiction over these proceedings.

Congress had previously given the federal government the power to seek eminent domain in the Act of April 24, 1888 ("An act to facilitate the prosecution of works projected for the improvement of rivers and harbors", 25 Stat. 94), which provided for condemnation proceedings in order to improve rivers or harbors, and which also required the federal government to seek eminent domain only in state courts. It amended this act on June 29, 1906, to permit condemnation proceedings even if the exercise of eminent domain solely benefited private parties. But the Condemnation Act of 1888 is much broader than either of these other statutes, as it allows any federal official to seek condemnation proceedings, allows condemnation for any "public purpose", and allows federal officials to proceed in either federal or state court. The authority of federal officials to exercise their powers under the Act was challenged by private citizens and the state of Missouri in the 1940s. In United States v. Carmack, 329 U.S. 230 (1946), the Supreme Court of the United States upheld the federal government's eminent domain powers under the Condemnation Act and further upheld the government's right to exercise eminent domain over land containing buildings owned by a state or local government. In United States v. Gettysburg Electric Ry. Co., 160 U.S. 668 (1896), the Supreme Court held that the Condemnation Act covered condemnation to acquire land for historic preservation purposes. This is a crucial precedent establishing broad federal authority to preserve historic sites. The Supreme Court also relied on a general reading of the Act in Olson v. United States, 292 U.S. 246 (1934), when it decided that the highest value of a piece of land could be taken into consideration in eminent domain proceedings but was not the only factor to be used in determining the fair market value of the land.

The Condemnation Act was still in force as of 2005. It is currently enacted primarily as section 3113 of Title 40 of the United States Code (2006; section 257 of the 1994 version), with some provisions related to venues and jurisdiction now covered under Title 28 (sections 1358 and 1403).

== See also ==
Eminent domain in the United States
Federal Declaration of Taking Act of 1931
