= United States v. Carmack =

- Supreme Court of the United States

Argued October 18, 1946 Decided December 9, 1946
- Full case name: United States v. Carmack
- Citations: 329 U.S. 230 (more) 67 S. Ct. 252; 91 L. Ed. 209; 1946 U.S. LEXIS 2996

Case history
- Prior: On appeal from the Circuit Court of Appeals for the Eighth Circuit, 151 F.2d 881 (8th Cir. 1945).

Holding
- The Supremacy Clause of the U.S. Constitution makes federal powers of eminent domain supreme, and the Condemnation Act of 1888 and Public Buildings Act of 1926 authorize the federal government to exercise eminent domain over state- and locally-owned land and/or buildings.

Court membership
- Chief Justice Fred M. Vinson Associate Justices Hugo Black · Stanley F. Reed; Felix Frankfurter · William O. Douglas; Frank Murphy · Robert H. Jackson; Wiley B. Rutledge · Harold H. Burton

Case opinions
- Majority: Burton, joined by Vinson, Black, Reed, Frankfurter, Murphy, Jackson, Rutledge
- Concurrence: Douglas

Laws applied
- Condemnation Act of August 1, 1888; Public Buildings Act of 1926

United States v. Carmack, 329 U.S. 230 (1946), was a unanimous decision of the Supreme Court of the United States which held that the United States federal government was empowered by Condemnation Act of August 1, 1888; the Public Buildings Act of 1926; and the United States Constitution to exercise its right of eminent domain over land containing buildings owned by a state or local government.

== Background ==
The Carmack family owned substantial tracts of land in which would eventually become the city of Cape Girardeau, Missouri. In 1807, the Carmack family conveyed, in trust, title to a plot of land to the City of Cape Girardeau with the restriction that the land only be used for public purposes. An adjacent plot of land was also conveyed in trust in 1820, with an identical restriction.

In the late 1930s, pursuant to their authority under the Condemnation Act of 1888 and the Public Buildings Act of 1926, the site was selected by the Federal Works Agency and the United States Postmaster General as the site for a future federal courthouse and a federal post office. In 1941, the United States sought permission to condemn that land and exercise its right of eminent domain from a United States district court. After judicial proceedings, the condemnation was approved. Iska W. Carmack, an heir of the Carmack family; the City of Cape Girardeau; and the state of Missouri contested the decision, but the district court held that Carmack had no right to contest the proceedings. All three parties appealed. The Eighth Circuit Court of Appeals reversed the decision of the district court and ordered the district court to reconsider the case and to include Carmack as a respondent.

In 1944, the district court held a second set of condemnation proceedings, and this time concluded that the United States had arbitrarily and capriciously selected the site in disregard for federal law and regulation. The United States appealed. The Eighth Circuit Court of Appeals affirmed the judgment of the district court, but on different grounds. The appellate court said that the Federal Works Agency and the Postmaster General did not have the statutory authority to begin condemnation proceedings.

The United States appealed to the U.S. Supreme Court, which granted certiorari.

== Decision ==
=== Majority opinion ===
In an opinion by Associate Justice Harold Hitz Burton, the unanimous Court reaffirmed the concept of eminent domain, recognizing the power of the government to seize land according to the Condemnation Act and Public Buildings Act. Burton asserted that the Court, far removed from the date of enactment of these laws, must be slow to read into them any limitation on public officials not expressly provided for by the acts. The majority also held as settled the concept (enunciated in Kohl v. United States, 91 U.S. 367 (1875)) that the federal government need not seek to enforce its eminent domain rights solely in state courts.

It made little difference whether the federal government sought to condemn private or public land, Burton concluded. Nor did it matter that the land was held by the state in trust, for the federal government had notified all title holders of its decision to condemn the land. Burton reviewed the constitutional grants of power which gave the United States the power of eminent domain and concluded that this power was supreme:

The considerations that made it appropriate for the Constitution to declare that the Constitution of the United States, and the laws of the United States made in pursuance thereof, shall be the supreme law of the land make it appropriate to recognize that the power of eminent domain, when exercised by Congress within its constitutional powers, be equally supreme.

Unwilling to read into the Condemnation Act or the Public Buildings Act limitations which were not there, Burton analyzed the process by which federal officials had chosen the site in question, and concluded that it represented a rational and reasonable exercise of the government's powers.

=== Concurrence ===
Associate Justice William O. Douglas concurred in the result and the opinion of the Court, but reserved judgment "as to the circumstances under which authority to condemn land owned by a city or a state should be inferred from a general condemnation statute if the local government challenged the taking."

== See also ==
- List of United States Supreme Court cases, volume 329
