= Rock Mary =

- U.S. National Register of Historic Places
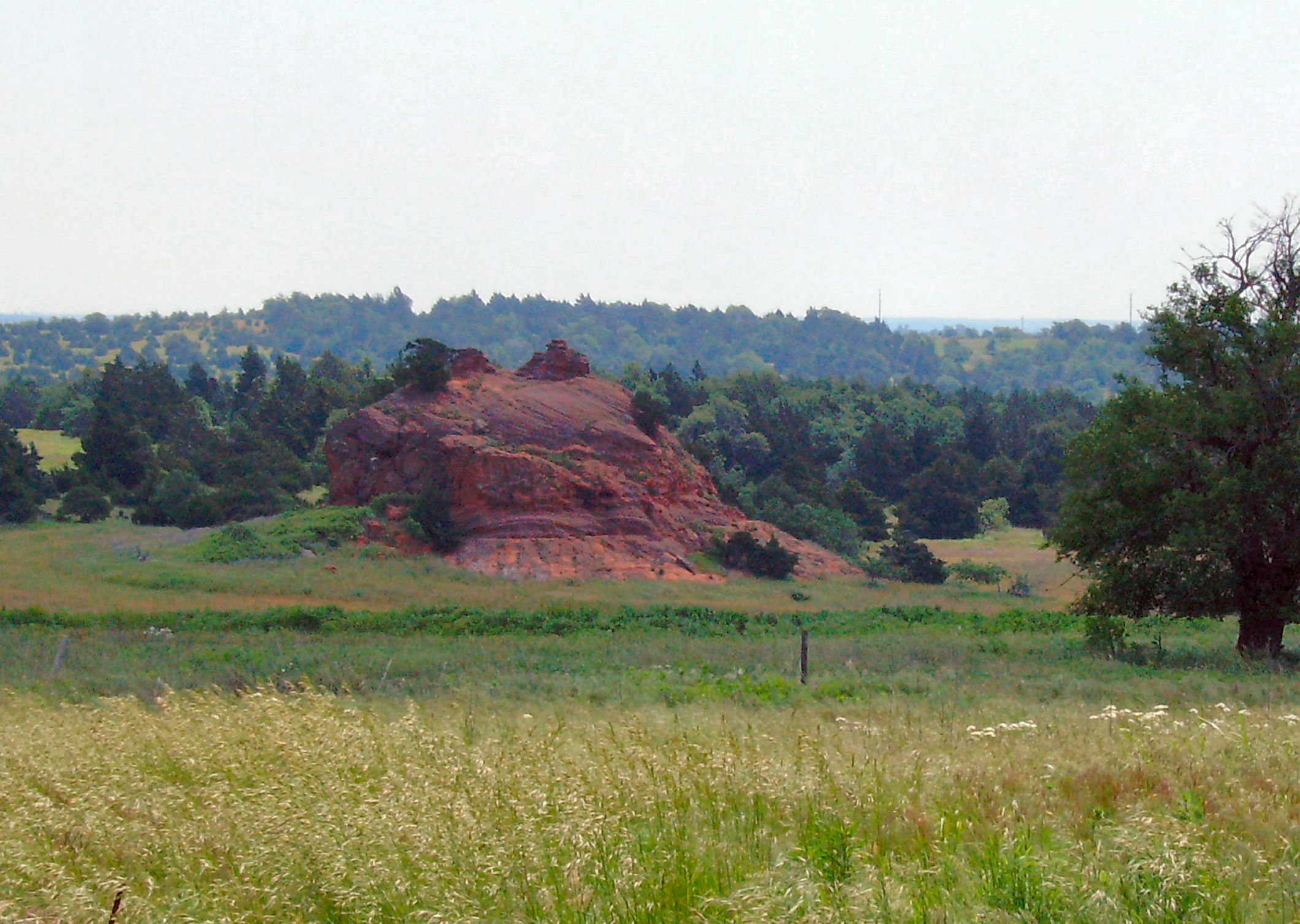
- Nearest city: Hinton, Oklahoma
- Coordinates: 35°27′35″N 98°25′32.03″W
- NRHP reference No.: 70000528
- Added to NRHP: June 22, 1970

Rock Mary, in Caddo County, Oklahoma, was a prominent landmark on the California Road. It was named in 1849 for Mary Conway, the then 17-year-old niece of James Sevier Conway, the Governor of Arkansas. Mary was the eldest daughter of Dr. John R. Conway, a prominent physician and surveyor, who emigrated to California with his wife and 10 children.

== Historical markers ==
At the base of the rock formation is a plaque with the following inscription:

ROCK MARY

May 23, 1849

This odd and unusual land feature was named on that date by Lieuts. J.E. Simpson and M.P. Harrison when they visited this site, planted a flag on the crest and named the rock for 17 year belle, Mary Conway, an emigrant.

Oklahoma Historical Society, 1960

A second plaque is located at the crest with the following inscription:

THE AMERICAN FLAG

ROCK MARY

From this point on May 23, 1849 the flag of the United States was unfurled by Lts. J.E. Simpson and M.P. Harrison who gave this rock its name. By this act they established this as a famous landmark relied on by countless thousands of western emigrants.

Oklahoma Historical Society, 1960 Rock Mary was chosen as a landmark on the southern trail to California, called the California Trail by Captain Marcy. It stood out on the prairie and could be seen from a distance. The formation seen in the picture is low relative to the surrounding land and can not be seen from far away as it is in the breaks of the creek. Marcy picked the hill because of its prominence and just southeast of the foot of the hill was a spring (since gone dry) and a good camp ground with wood available in the nearby breaks.

== Access ==
The landmark is located on private property where no trespassing is allowed. The Hinton Historical Museum has been granted access management of the property and can allow visitors to enter with advance notice. The museum is located in Hinton, 5 miles east of the Rock.
