= Federal Declaration of Taking Act of 1931 =

1931 US Federal statute

- Long title: An Act to expedite the construction of public buildings and works outside of the District of Columbia by enabling possession and title of sites to be taken in advance of final judgment in proceedings for the acquisition thereof under the power of eminent domain.
- Acronyms (colloquial): DTA
- Nicknames: Declaration of Taking
- Enacted by: the 71st United States Congress
- Effective: February 26, 1931

Citations
- Public law: Pub. L. 71–736
- Statutes at Large: 46 Stat. 1421

Codification
- Titles amended: 40 U.S.C.: Public Buildings, Properties, and Public Works
- U.S.C. sections created: 40 U.S.C. ch. 31, subch. II §§ 3114, 3115, 3116, 3118

Legislative history
- Introduced in the House as H.R. 14255; Signed into law by President Herbert Hoover on February 26, 1931

United States Supreme Court cases
- Kohl v. United States (1875); United States v. Gettysburg Electric Railroad Company (1896); Chicago, Burlington & Quincy Railroad Co. v. City of Chicago (1897); Berman v. Parker (1954); Penn Central v. New York City (1978); Hawaii Housing Authority v. Midkiff (1984)

Federal Declaration of Taking Act of 1931 is a federal statute granting the federal government power to acquire private land for public use purposes in the United States, a process known as eminent domain. The Fifth Amendment to the United States Constitution's "Takings Clause" limits government over-reach by obliging the government body concerned award "just compensation" to a property owner relinquishing private property for public use purposes.

The 71st Congressional session codified the regulatory taking clause of the constitutional law with the passage of the H.R. 14255 bill. The legislation was enacted into law by the 31st President of the United States Herbert Hoover on February 26, 1931.

== Provisions of the Act ==
The public property acquisition act was penned as five sections facilitating the transfer of private property appropriated for public use purposes in the continental United States.

Declaration of Taking
46 Stat. 1421-1422 § I
* Acquisition of public building sites for public use
* Declaration of Taking to be filed
* Statements annexed regarding Declaration of Taking
* Title to vest in United States upon deposit of just compensation
* Compensation to be ascertained
* Interest
* No commission charges
* Payment upon application of parties in interest
* If compensation award exceeds payment made judgment entered for deficit
* Power of court to fix time for surrender of possession
* Orders respecting encumbrances
Vesting Not Prevented or Delayed
46 Stat. 1422 § II
* Vesting of title not delayed by appeal
Irrevocable Commitment of Federal Government
46 Stat. 1422 § III
* Payment of ultimate award
Right of Taking as Addition to Existing Rights
46 Stat. 1422 § IV
* Prior rights not abrogated
Authorized Purposes of Expenditures After Irrevocable Commitment
46 Stat. 1422 § V
* Expenditures when United States committed to pay awards
* Validity of title

== See also ==
- Bankhead–Jones Farm Tenant Act of 1937
- Federal lands
- Condemnation Act of 1888
- Frazier–Lemke Farm Bankruptcy Act of 1934
- Eminent domain in the United States
- Ketch Ranch House (Oklahoma)
- Farm Security Administration
- Protected areas of the United States

== Bibliography ==
- Lewis, John (1888). A Treatise on the Law of Eminent Domain in the United States. Chicago, Illinois: Callaghan & Company. LCCN 13010152. OCLC 1668306.
- Nichols, Philip (1917). The Law of Eminent Domain; A Treatise on the Principles which Affect the Taking of Property for the Public Use. Vol. I. Albany, New York: Matthew Bender & Company. OCLC 43697002 – via Internet Archive.
- Nichols, Philip (1917). The Law of Eminent Domain; A Treatise on the Principles which Affect the Taking of Property for the Public Use. Vol. II. Albany, New York: Matthew Bender & Company. OCLC 43697002 – via Internet Archive.
- Epstein, Richard Allen (1985). Takings: Private Property and the Power of Eminent Domain. Cambridge, Massachusetts: Harvard University Press. ISBN 978-0674036550. OCLC 12079263.
- Paul, Ellen Frankel (1987). Property Rights and Eminent Domain. New Brunswick, New Jersey: Transaction Books. ISBN 978-0887380945. OCLC 14165014.
