= California Road =

Former route through the southwestern U.S.

The California Road was a route which ran through present-day Oklahoma (then known only as Indian Territory), along the Canadian River, at the time of the California Gold Rush. It was the southerly counterpart to the California Trail.

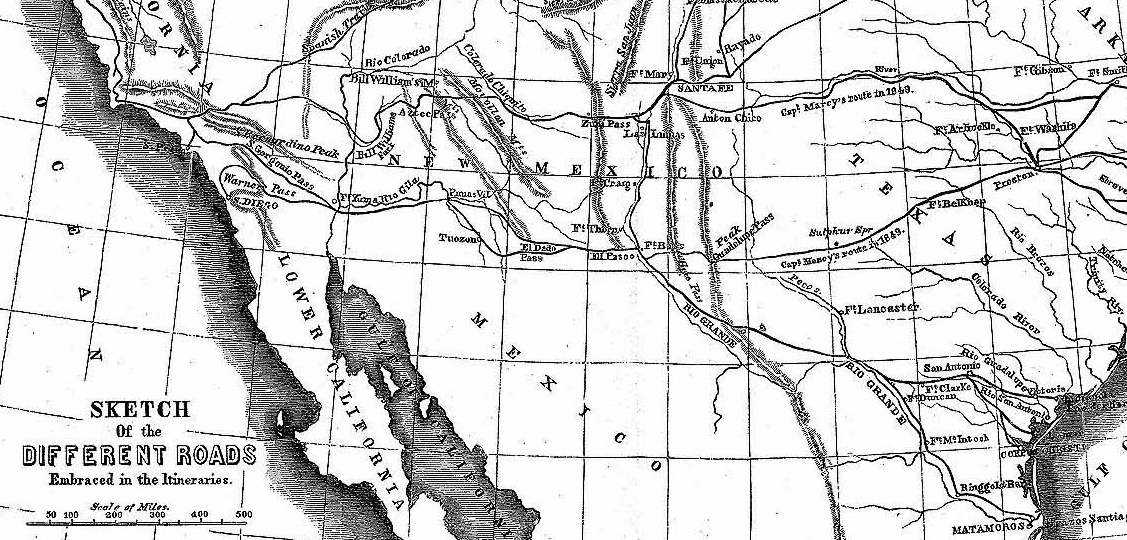
Map of Marcy's Itineraries. Note the northern and southern 1849 trails through Texas.

The California Road followed the route laid out by Captain Randolph B. Marcy escorting gold seekers during the spring of 1849. In 1850, Captain R.B. Marcy established Camp Arbuckle on the southern boundary of the Canadian River with close proximity to the 100th meridian west. The Army on the Frontier fortification served as a deterrent to the Plains Indian warfare and the safeguard of the California Road spanning Indian Territory.

The American frontier trail converged at Fort Smith where the overland trail crossed into Indian Territory and generally followed the Canadian River to the Texas Panhandle. The trail continued across the Panhandle along the Canadian into New Mexico where it met an existing trail south out of Santa Fe to El Paso and west into California. The peak number of emigrants from the eastern United States to California was about twenty thousand on this route in 1849.

The crossing of the east-west California Road with the north–south Texas Road formed a natural point of settlement in Tobucksy County of the Choctaw Nation, a site originally called Bucklucksy. James Jackson McAlester, an employee of licensed traders Reynolds and Hannaford convinced the firm to locate a general store at that location in late 1869. This settlement eventually became McAlester, Oklahoma.

Prominent landmarks in western Indian Territory were Rock Mary and the Antelope Hills.

== The Prairie Traveler ==
"Another road leaves Fort Smith and runs up the south side of the Canadian River to Santa Fé and Albuquerque in New Mexico.

This route is set down upon most of the maps of the present day as having been discovered and explored by various persons, but my own name seems to have been carefully excluded from the list. Whether this omission has been intentional or not, I leave for the authors to determine. I shall merely remark that I had the command and entire direction of an expedition which in 1849 discovered, explored, located, and marked out this identical wagon road from Fort Smith, Arkansas, to Santa Fé, New Mexico, and that this road, for the greater portion of the distance, is the same that has been since recommended for a Pacific railway."

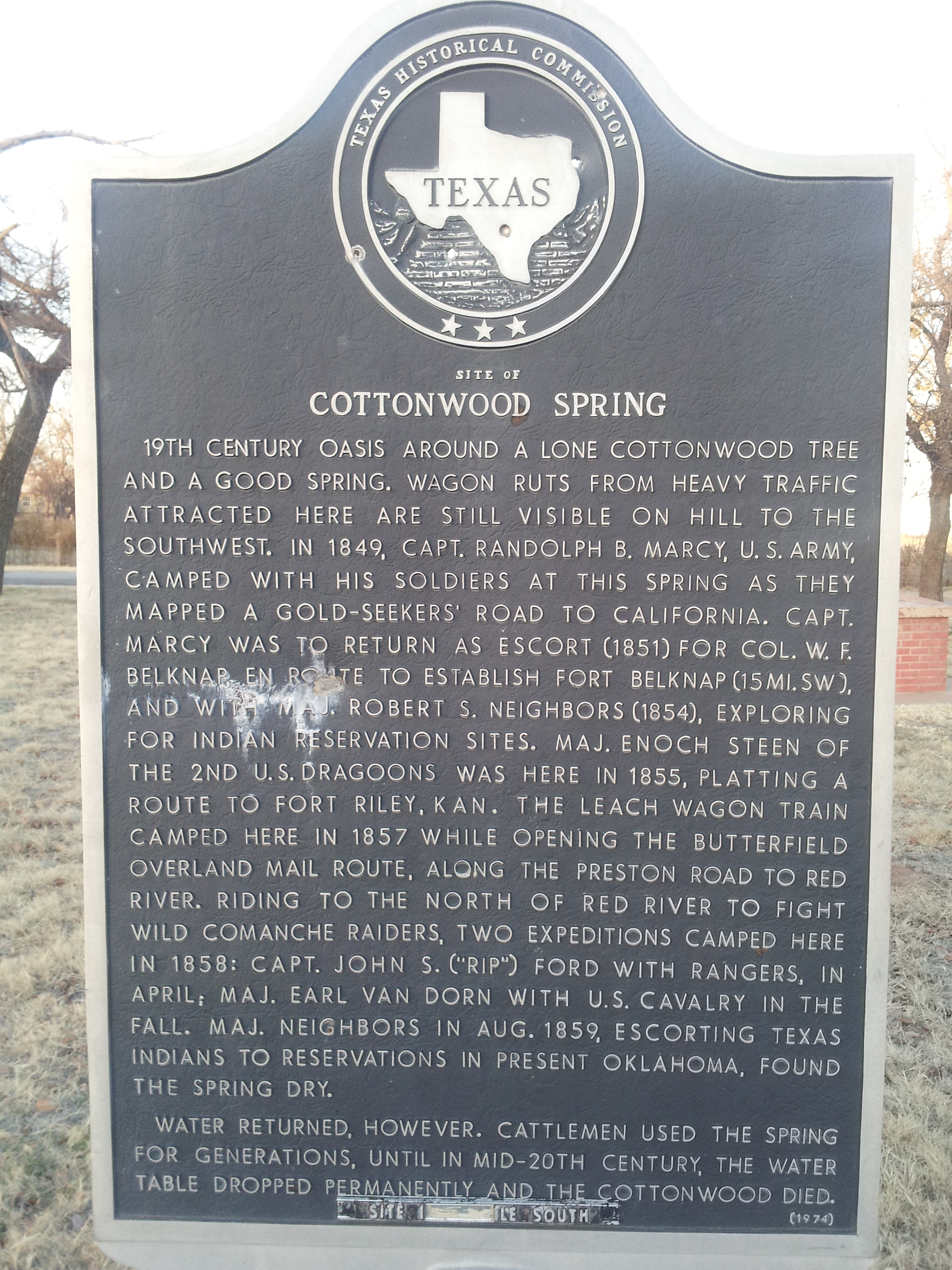
Cottonwood Spring Texas Historical Marker just north of Jean on the southern route.

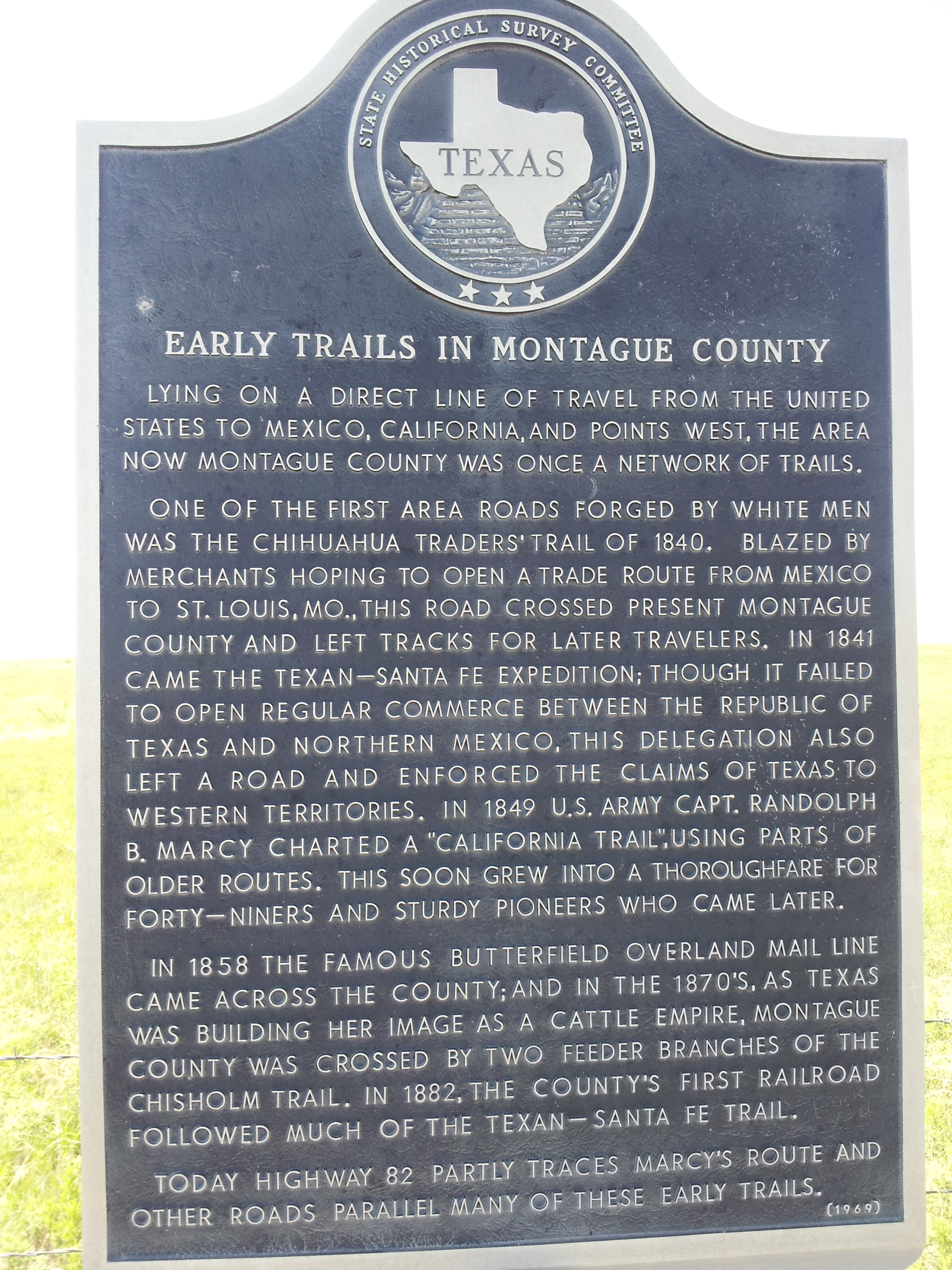
Texas Historical Marker on Highway 82 east of Ringgold.

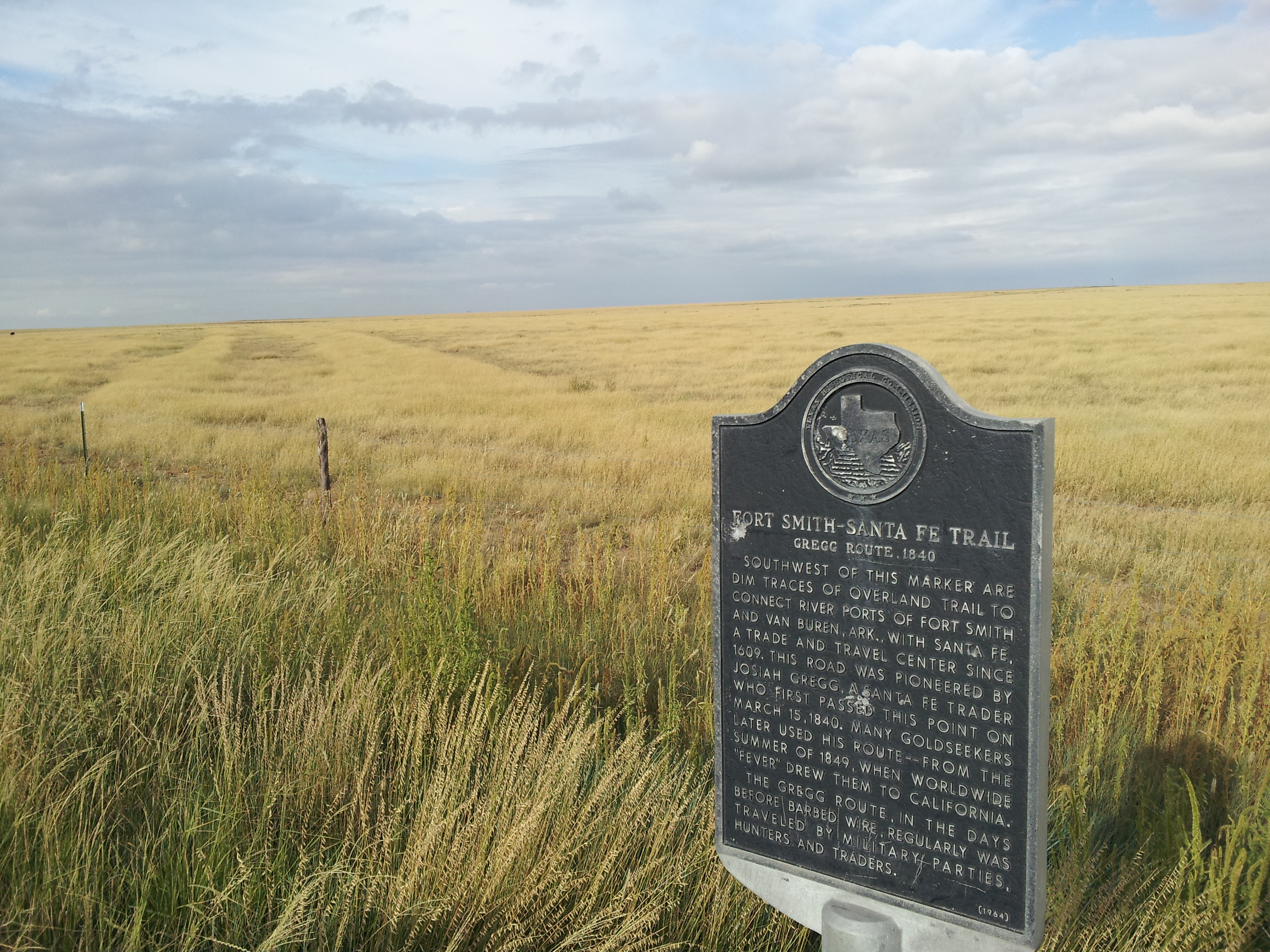
Texas Historical Marker northeast of Amarillo, on Highway 136 just north of the intersection with 245, commemorating the Josiah Gregg route.

== See also ==
- California Trail
