= Oklahoma Gold Rush =

Gold rush from 1890 to 1907

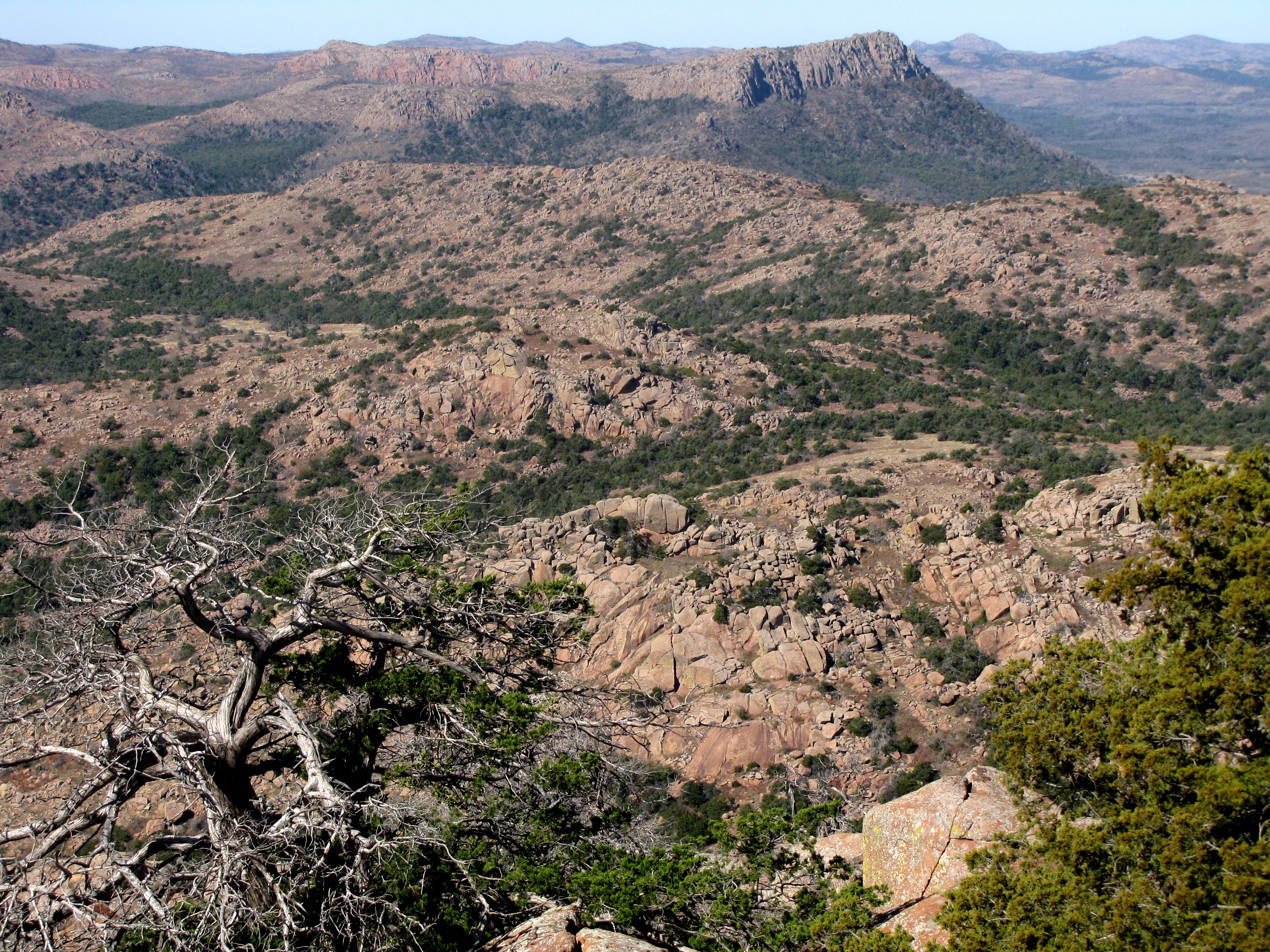
- Mount Sheridan near Meers Mining Camp
- Date: 1890 - 1907
- Location: Wichita Mountains; Comanche County; Kiowa County; Oklahoma; 34.762231°N 98.585292°W
- Outcome: Indian Territory recognized as organized territory and statehood granted November 16, 1907
- Territorial Clause: Oklahoma Organic Act of 1890
- New States Clause: Oklahoma Enabling Act of 1906

Oklahoma Gold Rush (1890 - 1907), referred as Wichita Mountains Gold Rush District, was orchestrated in Southwestern Oklahoma consisting of fault block geological formation encompassing fifty-nine thousand and twenty acres. The placer mining commenced from 1890 to 1900 for lode of metalliferous mineral deposits. The mineral extraction activities prior to 1900 became known as Illegal Rush. Mineral prospectors populated the native lands starting 1901 with the coinage metal seekers ceasing the precious metal fever by 1907 in the Wichita Mountains range.

Summer of 1901 . . . opening of Kiowa, Comanche, and Apache Reservation illustration

The Southwest Oklahoma lands were allotted as an indian reservation established by;

☆ Medicine Lodge Treaty, 1867
☆ Dawes Act, 1887
☆ Jerome Agreement, 1889

The Kiowa, Comanche, and Apache reservation was allocated as two million and eight hundred thousand acres for Native Americans in Southwest Oklahoma. The Kiowa, Comanche, and Apache reservation provisioned a forage reserve for grazing livestock which was allocated as four hundred and eighty-eight thousand acres known as the Big Pasture.

The mountainous terrain was designated as Indian Territory judicially recognized as unorganized territory from 1890 to 1900. The territory was susceptible to prohibited access given the fenceless forest lands and open range. The mining speculators consumed with doubt and eagerness were figuratively vying as the Sooners participating in Land Rush of 1889. On July 4, 1901, the unorganized territory was opened by confirmation of President William McKinley endorsing Proclamation 460.

Opening of Native Lands and U.S. Presidential Proclamations

Calendar Date	Proc. No.	Proclamation Title	U.S. President
July 4, 1901	460	Opening of Wichita, Comanche, Kiowa, and Apache Indian Lands	William McKinley
September 19, 1906	653	Opening of Kiowa, Comanche, and Apache Indian Reservations	Theodore Roosevelt

Southwest Indian Territory and United States Statutes

Date of Enactment	Public Law	U.S. Statute	Bill No.	U.S. President
June 6, 1900	P.L. 56-813	31 Stat. 672	H.R. 8582	William McKinley
January 4, 1901	P.L. 56-8	31 Stat. 727	H.R. 209	William McKinley
March 3, 1901	P.L. 56-846	31 Stat. 1093	S. 5188	William McKinley
June 5, 1906	P.L. 59-197	34 Stat. 213	H.R. 17507	Theodore Roosevelt

The Plains Indians and early pioneers offered narratives of sixteenth century to eighteenth century exploits beseeching precious earthly possessions by Old World explorers. The Wichita Mountains terrain was discovered with a scattering of mine diggings indicating prior exploratory undertakings. The earthly disturbances and physical dugout’s appearances validated the narratives of encounters by earlier New World venturers.

Wichita Mountain Gold Rush District observed a frenzy of ample mining claims and immediate boomtowns. The rustic settlements were established as tents and shanty shacks constructed from hand hewn timber provided by the rugged terrain. Steam-powered sawmills were equipped with sawmill blades clenched in a carriageable wooden frame for rip cuts of timber logs. The timber mill was integrated with steam powered machinery incorporating the features of portable engine, steam tractor, or traction engine. The settlements were supported by assay office, post office, saloon, and trading post. The elevated geologic formation was pioneered by several significant boomtowns;

Wichita Mountains Gold Rush District Boomtowns

Craterville	Doris
Golden Pass	Meers
Oreana	Poverty Gulch
Ridge City	Wildman

== Spanish Prospectors in Wichita Mountains ==
Wichita Mountains (Spanish: Sierra Jumanos) is believed to have captivated the first Spanish conquistadors during the Age of Discovery. The epoch was defined by the geographical exploration of North America as orchestrated by the Spanish Empire during the sixteenth century inland expeditions.

The Spanish colonization of the Americas revealed substantial developments with the establishment of the territorial entities known as New Spain and Spanish Texas. The Red River of the South was explored by the Spaniards originating during the 16th century. Montague County, Texas sustains events chronicled at Spanish Fort bearing northeast of Nocona, Texas dating to the eighteenth century.

A Franciscan friar Juan de Salas established a Spanish mission disclosed as San Calixto settled at the Wichita Mountains in 1629. San Calixto was illustrated on maps entitled Spanish Dominions In North America geographically situated along the Natchitoches River or Red River. Cartographers distinctly depicting the domain were Aaron Arrowsmith in 1802, John Pinkerton in 1811, and Alexander von Humboldt in 1827.

Spanish Dominions In North America Illustrations

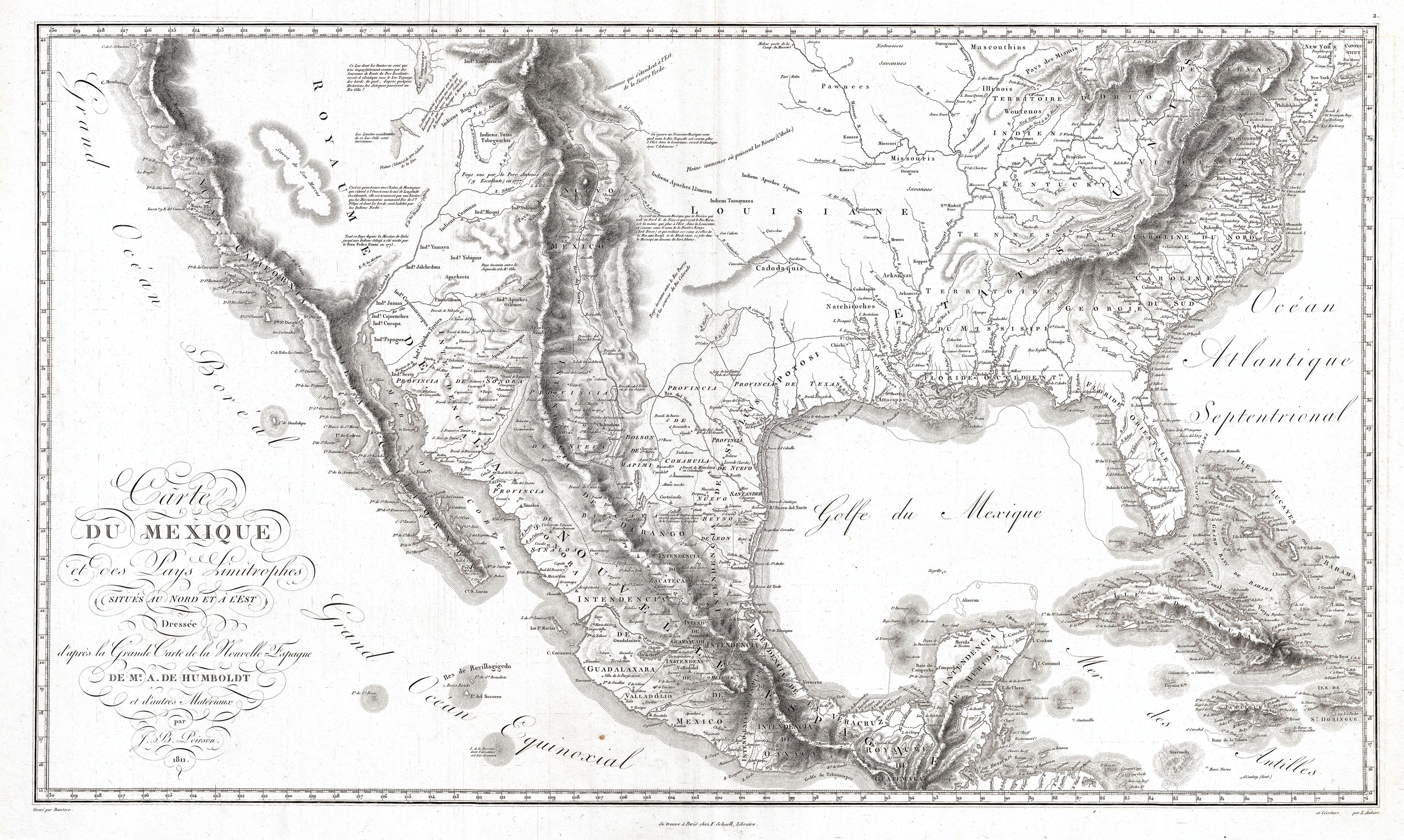
Humboldt's Carte Du Mexique ... San Calixto on Natchitoches River

Humboldt's Map of New Spain ... San Calixto on Rio Rojo de Natchitoches

Pinkerton's Modern Atlas ... San Calixto on Red River

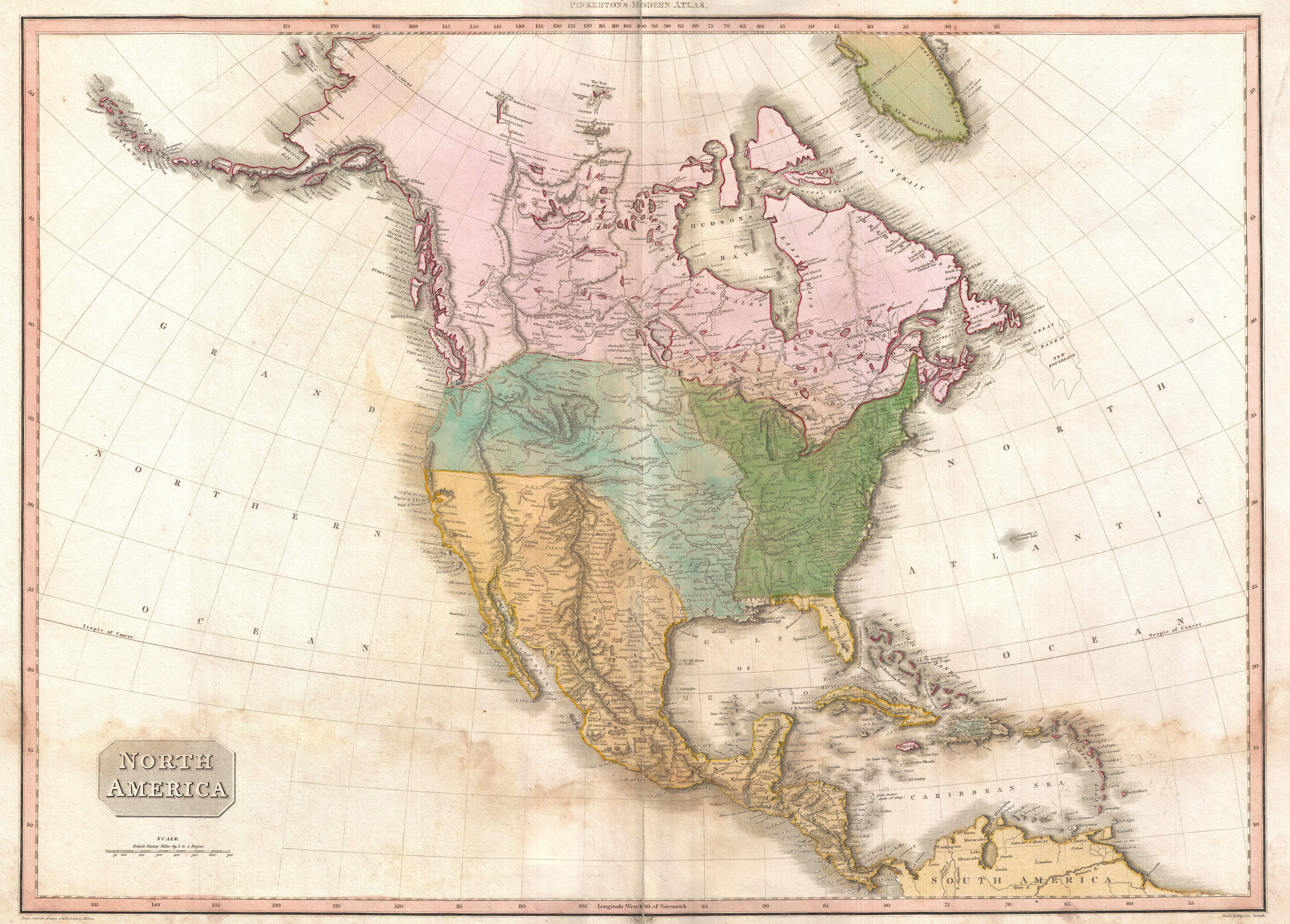
Pinkerton's Modern Atlas ... San Calixto Village on Red River

The Spanish Empire explored native kingdoms specifically for gold mining and silver mining collectively as the proprietors of the Treasure of Villena and the Spanish royal crown's decrees often referred to as the Doctrine of Discovery and Laws of the Indies. The monarchy and regal decrees entitled chartering expeditionary campaigns to collect geological and mineral surveys on distant coasts and continents.

The Spanish Empire's exploratory caravans were possessed by the tales of the earlier explorers who exalted the New World's mythic lands. A dominion located in the Terra incognita cartographically recognized as the outlying northern territory of North America. The Spanish conquistadors conceptualized the New World's landscape by a covetous euphoria for the Iberian Peninsula horde beseeching the Seven Cities of Gold treasuring the similarities of the Las Médulas.

The group eleven elements were an alluring earthly possession serving as a periodic element for the crown jewels. The mineral ore forged as a coinage metal or milled coinage for the currency of Spain and Spanish America authentically illustrated by the Spanish escudo. The precious metals were mutually considered a barter and medium of exchange for cultural diplomacy and greetings with native kingdoms.

The Spanish prospector's packhorse route was a southerly journey into the Texas Blackland Prairies migrating into the Lower Rio Grande Valley ― Atascocita Road ― while transitioning to the Gulf Coastal Plain venturing the coastal geography of northeastern Mexico's mountainous region known as Sierra Madre Oriental. The prized noble metal was conferred for transfer on the east coast of Mexico at the port of Veracruz ― San Juan de Ulúa ― treasure port for Spanish Main.

The transition metals encompassed an overland passage — Old Spanish Trail — of the New World to Spanish galleons of the Spanish treasure fleet in St. Augustine, Florida adorned by the Spanish fortification Castillo de San Marcos. Spain's medieval ships would potentially anchor in Havana and Spanish Wells for mustering seafaring provisions, water, and wine. The spanish cargo fleets ― 1715 Treasure Fleet ― continued the nautical voyage with winds sustaining the transatlantic crossing to the Old World in anticipation of the King's treasure homecoming in Cádiz and Cartagena, Spain.

The Habsburg Monarchy of Spain encountered acts of piracy among their Spanish flota of galleons navigating the Caribbean Sea and North Atlantic ocean. The commerce raiding and privateering of Spanish cargo vessels culminated as a discord known as the Treasure crisis of 1568 which emboldened the Convention of Nymegen.

== Primitive Arrastra Mill in Wichita Mountains ==
In 1955, a primitive mill, recognized as an arrastra, was discovered 2 miles (3.2 km) south of Meers, Oklahoma near Meers Road or Oklahoma State Highway 115.

The 16th-century mill, situated to close proximity of Cedar Creek, was considered to be of Spanish design and origin. The arrastra permitted comminution of earth elements being gold and silver. The grinding mill has the similarity of a Chilean mill or edge mill utilized for mineral pulverization. The fragmentation process formed a suitable ductile element for conveyance by pack saddle and overland passages.

== See also ==
- Coronado Exposition Commission Act of 1939
- Great Plains State Park
- Jean Baptiste Brevelle
- Natchitoches Trace
- Sutter's Mill
- United States Assay Commission
- Wichita Mountains Wildlife Refuge

United States Statutes related to coinage metals

- Coinage Act of 1873
- Specie Payment Resumption Act of 1875
- Bland-Allison Act of 1878
- Sherman Silver Purchase Act of 1890
- Gold Standard Act of 1900

== Documents related to Southwest Indian Territory and Indian Affairs ==
☆ Fifty-Third U.S. Congress (March 1, 1894). Presented Memorial to Kiowa, Comanche, and Apache Indian Reservation - Anadarko, Oklahoma, October 20, 1893 (PDF). S. Misc. Doc. 53-102 (Report). U.S. Congressional Serial Set 3167. Vol. 1. U.S. Government Publishing Office.
☆ Fifty-Fifth U.S. Congress (January 28, 1899). Number of Adult Male Indians Belonging to the Kiowa, Comanche, and Apache Tribes in October, 1892 (PDF). S. Doc. 55-84 (Report). U.S. Congressional Serial Set 3731. Vol. 7. U.S. Government Publishing Office.
☆ Fifty-Sixth U.S. Congress (January 15, 1900). Quantity, Nature, and Character of the Lands of the Kiowa, Comanche, and Apache Reservation (PDF). S. Doc. 56-75 (Report). U.S. Congressional Serial Set 3850. Vol. 8. U.S. Government Publishing Office.

== Bibliography ==
- Gideon, David Clark (1901). Indian Territory, Descriptive, Biographical and Genealogical: Landed Estates, County Seats, General History of the Territory. New York: Lewis Publishing Company. LCCN 02017444. OCLC 29775085. OL 6918227M – via Hathitrust Digital Library.
- Shannon, Charles William (September 1916). Handbook on the Natural Resources of Oklahoma. Norman, Oklahoma: Oklahoma Geological Survey. p. 79. OCLC 13100251.
- Foreman, Grant (September 1924). "Red River and the Spanish Boundary in the United States Supreme Court". The Chronicles of Oklahoma. 2 (3 - Autumn 1924). Oklahoma Historical Society: 298–310. LCCN 23027299. OCLC 655582328.
- Foreman, Grant (June 1925). "Early Trails Through Oklahoma". The Chronicles of Oklahoma. 3 (2 - Summer 1925). Oklahoma Historical Society: 99–119. LCCN 23027299. OCLC 655582328.
- Thomas, Ph.D., Alfred Barnaby (June 1928). "Spanish Exploration of Oklahoma, 1599-1792". Quarterly of the Oklahoma Historical Society, June, 1928. Oklahoma Historical Society. OCLC 18724042 – via Hathitrust Digital Library.
- Estill, A. Emma (December 1931). "The Great Lottery: August 6, 1901". The Chronicles of Oklahoma. 9 (4 - Winter 1931). Oklahoma Historical Society: 365–381. LCCN 23027299. OCLC 655582328.
- Writers' Program of the Work Projects Administration (1941). Oklahoma: A Guide to the Sooner State. Norman, Oklahoma: University of Oklahoma Press. LCCN 41046185. OCLC 1598198. OL 6429037M – via Internet Archive.
- Wilson, Steve (1976). Oklahoma Treasures and Treasure Tales. Norman, Oklahoma: University of Oklahoma Press. ISBN 978-0806121741. OCLC 1137911.
- Hale, Duane K. (1981). "Gold in Oklahoma: The Last Great Gold Excitement in the Trans-Mississippi West, 1889-1918". The Chronicles of Oklahoma. 59 (3 - Fall 1981). Oklahoma Historical Society: 304–319. LCCN 23027299. OCLC 655582328.
- Wilson, Steve (1982). Dauntless Gold Seekers of the Wichitas [Drill Bits, Picks, and Shovels: A History of Mineral Resources in Oklahoma]. The Gateway to Oklahoma History. Oklahoma City, Oklahoma: Oklahoma Historical Society. pp. 132–161. ISBN 0941498247. LCCN 82-81962. OCLC 982029050.
- Everett, Dianna. "European Exploration". The Encyclopedia of Oklahoma History and Culture. Oklahoma Historical Society.
- Weaver, Bobby D. "Gold". The Encyclopedia of Oklahoma History and Culture. Oklahoma Historical Society.
- Jones, Peter D. (2021). "The First Coins of the Americas". Internet Archive. Bookbaby.

== Oklahoma Minerals and Miner Publications ==
- Davis, Frank C (1904–1905). Mineral Kingdom (Newspaper). Oklahoma Historical Society ~ The Gateway to Oklahoma History. Lawton, Oklahoma: Frank C. Davis. LCCN sn96087646. OCLC 34489855.
- Davis, Frank C (1905–1907). Oklahoma Farm News and Mineral Kingdom [Oklahoma Farm News] (Newspaper). United States Library of Congress. Lawton, Oklahoma: Frank C. Davis. LCCN sn96087647. OCLC 34490168.
- Davis, Frank C (1903–1904). Mount Sheridan Miner (Newspaper). United States Library of Congress. Meers, Comanche County, Oklahoma: Starbuck & Davis. LCCN sn96087644. OCLC 34489262.
- Davis, Frank C (1904). Mount Sheridan Daily Miner (Newspaper). United States Library of Congress. Meers, Comanche County, Oklahoma: Frank C. Davis. LCCN sn96087645. OCLC 34489667.
- Otter Creek Miner (Newspaper). Wildman, Kiowa County, Oklahoma: Miner Print Company. 1901. OCLC 35980987.

== Historical Video Archive ==
☆ Back In Time: The Lost Gold of Oklahoma on YouTube
☆ The Coronado Expedition : Coronado National Memorial on YouTube
☆ How 19th Century Mobile Sawmills Changed America Forever on YouTube
☆ Steam Sawmill: Traction Engine Sawing Timber on YouTube
