= Army on the Frontier =

United States Army history

The "Army on the Frontier" is a term applied to the activities of the United States Army stationed near the frontier settlements from the beginning of national existence until about 1890, the end of the settlers' frontier.

The principal functions performed by the U.S. Army were:

- guarding the frontier settlements in forts from hostile indigenous peoples;
- aiding the settlement of the West by developing and protecting the communication between the older settlements and the frontier, by exploring the West, constructing roads and defending the overland trails, water routes and later telegraph and railroad lines;
- policing the frontier until the civil governments could maintain order.

== Indian Wars ==
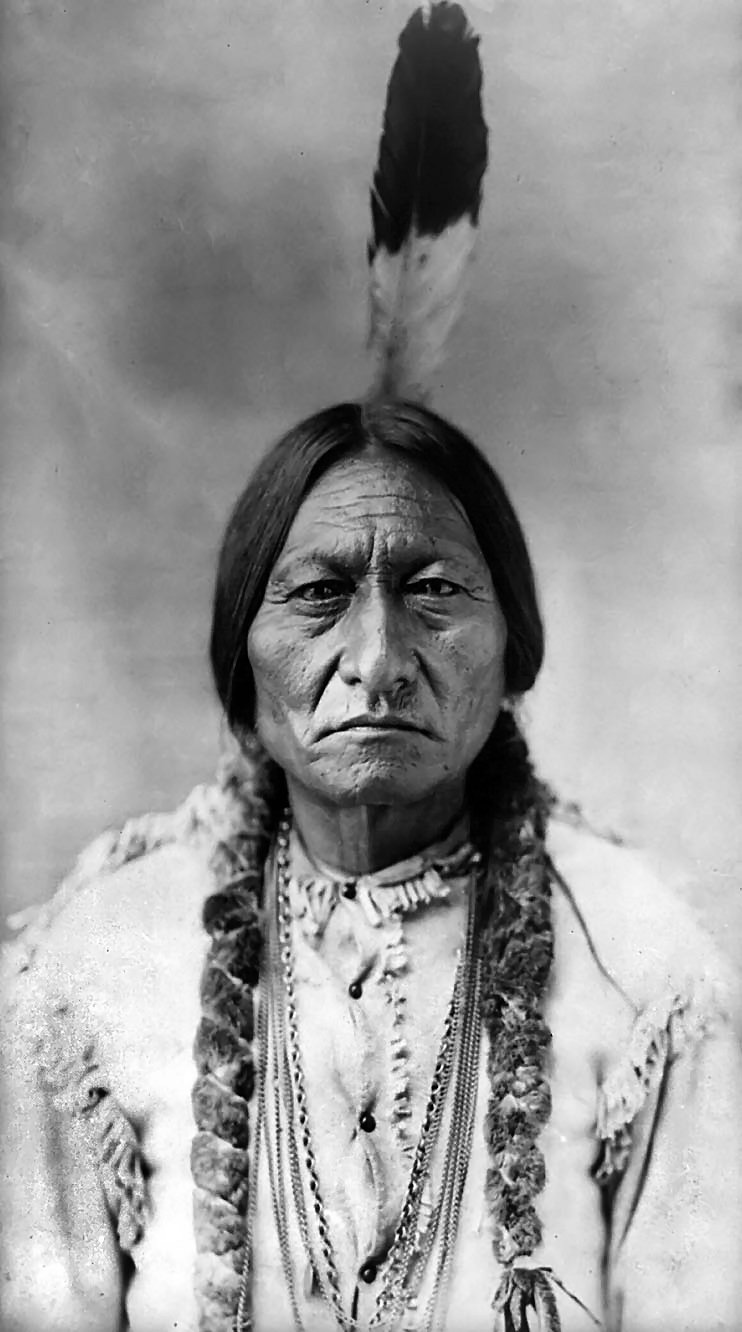
Chief Sitting Bull

Indian wars have occurred throughout the United States though the conflicts are generally separated into two categories; the Indian wars east of the Mississippi River and the Indian wars west of the Mississippi. The U.S. Bureau of the Census (1894) provided an estimate of deaths:

The Indian wars under the government of the United States have been more than 40 in number. They have cost the lives of about 19,000 white men, women and children, including those killed in individual combats, and the lives of about 30,000 Indians. The actual number of killed and wounded Indians must be very much higher than the given... Fifty percent additional would be a safe estimate...

The western movement of settlers brought conflict with the Indians. Scores of Indian wars and campaigns were fought by the Army. Some of the more notable Indian wars were: the Northwest Indians, 1790–95 and 1811–13; Seminole Wars in Florida, 1817–18, 1835–42 and 1856; Black Hawk War, 1832; Sioux War, 1862–1867; War of the Plains Indians, 1863–69; Sioux and Cheyenne War of 1876–79; and Apache Wars, 1861–90. These wars were fought by the regular infantry and cavalry regiments, occasionally aided by state militia and volunteers.

The frontier soldiers were usually stationed in posts at strategic points defending the routes of communications, settlements and Indian reservations. The strength of this army, about one half of the Regular Army in time of peace, ranged from 1,423 troops in 1790 in the Northwest Territory to over 26,000 in 1868, which was the height of the Indian wars on the Great Plains. The frontier posts had, on average, a garrison of 200 troops.

By 1867, over 100 posts were scattered throughout the West. As the Indian wars ended after 1870, these posts were rapidly abandoned. The army's supplies were carried by boats, steamboats, ox and mule trains, pack mules and horses and later by railroads, which stimulated the development of trade, farming and ranching. The difficulty of supplying these remote Army posts encouraged farming and urban enterprises around the posts, the beginning of permanent settlements. The daily life of the frontier soldier was a hardy one. The soldiers built their shelter, escorted travelers, emigrants, and wagon trains on the trails, aided and protected surveying parties, constructed thousands of miles of trails and roads, supplied needy emigrants, patrolled trails and railroad lines, guarded river navigation, protected government and private property from hostile Indians and outlaws, assisted and fed friendly Indians, fought hostile Indians and gave police assistance to the weak civil authorities on the frontier. Their shelters were usually log, stone, adobe or sod huts constructed largely by their own labor. The hardships of the soldiers, the miserable quarters, inferior food and the lonely life encouraged many desertions.

The Army on the Frontier disagreed with the Bureau of Indian Affairs and the frontier civil authorities over the Indian policy. The frontiersmen in general demanded the destruction or removal of the Indians (see Indian removal). The Indian Bureau attempted to protect the Indians, and the Army to coerce them.

When the Indians revolted, the U.S. Army made war upon the entire Indian tribe, punishing the innocent with the guilty, even to the extent of killing women and children in raids on villages or camps. The Indian Bureau and the Army officials accused each other of being responsible for the Indian wars.

== See also ==
- American frontier
- History of the United States Army
