= The Chronicles of Oklahoma =

- Language: English

Publication details
- History: 1921–present
- Publisher: Oklahoma Historical Society (United States)
- Frequency: Quarterly

Standard abbreviations
- ISO 4: Chron. Okla.

Indexing
- ISSN: 0009-6024
- LCCN: 23027299
- OCLC no.: 647927893

Links
- Journal homepage

The Chronicles of Oklahoma is the scholarly journal published by the Oklahoma Historical Society. It is a quarterly publication and was first published in 1921.

The Chronicles of Oklahoma includes scholarly articles, book reviews, notes and documents, and the minutes of the quarterly meetings of the OHS Board of Directors.

All members of the Oklahoma Historical Society receive a subscription to The Chronicles of Oklahoma.

The Society's Gateway to Oklahoma History website includes digital versions of journal articles since 1921.
