= Moore =

Moore may refer to:

== Language ==
- Mooré language, spoken in West Africa

== People ==
- Moore (surname)
  - List of people with surname Moore
- Moore Crosthwaite (1907–1989), a British diplomat and ambassador
- Moore Disney (1765–1846), a senior officer in the British Army
- Moore Powell (died c. 1573), a Welsh politician

== Places ==
=== Australia ===
- Moore, Queensland, a town in the Somerset Region
- Division of Moore, an electoral division in Western Australia

=== Greenland ===
- Moore Glacier

=== United Kingdom ===
- Moore, Cheshire, England

=== United States ===
- Moore, Idaho
- Moore, Indiana
- Moore, Montana
- Moore, New Jersey
- Moore, Oklahoma
- Moore Township, Pennsylvania
- Moore, South Carolina
- Moore, Texas
- Moore, Utah
- Moore, Washington
- Moore, West Virginia
- Moore County, North Carolina
- Moore County, Tennessee
- Moore County, Texas
- Moore Haven, Florida
- Banning, California, formerly known as Moore City

== Schools ==
=== Australia ===
- Moore Theological College, Sydney, Australia

=== United States ===
- Moore Catholic High School, in Staten Island, New York
- Moore College of Art and Design, in Philadelphia
- Moore Traditional High School, grades 6–12 school in Louisville, Kentucky

== Other uses ==
- Moore (lunar crater)
- Moore's law, the empirical observation that the transistor density of integrated circuits doubles every two years
- Moore machine, finite state automaton where the outputs are determined by the current state alone in the theory of computation
- Moore 30, an American sailboat design

== See also ==
- Moore Hall (disambiguation)
- Mohr (disambiguation)
- Moor (disambiguation)
- Moore High School (disambiguation)
- Moore Township (disambiguation)
- MOR (disambiguation)
- Mór (disambiguation)
- More (disambiguation)
- Moore v. United States (disambiguation)
- United States v. Moore (disambiguation)
