= Giovanni Moro =

Giovanni Moro may refer to:

- Johannes Morus (Italian: Giovanni Moro; died 1254), servant of the Emperor Frederick II
- Giovanni Moro (1406–1456), Venetian diplomat and member of the Moro family
- Giovanni Moro (1542–1592), Venetian ambassador and member of the Moro family
- Giovanni Moro (skier) (born 1967)

== See also ==
- Giovanni Morone
