= Mohr =

Mohr may refer to:

== Places ==
- Mohr, Fars, a city in Iran
- Mohr County, an administrative subdivision of Iran
- Mohr Rural District, an administrative subdivision of Iran

== Science and math ==
- Mohr's circle, two-dimensional graphical representation of the state of stress at a point
- Mohr–Coulomb theory, mathematical model describing the response of brittle materials
- Mohr–Mascheroni theorem, used in mathematics and geometry
- Mohr pipette, a laboratory volumetric instrument
- Mohr's salt, common name of Ammonium iron(II) sulfate

== Other ==
- Mohr (surname), a German-language surname (also listing people with that surname)
- Michigan Organization for Human Rights, a defunct Michigan LGBT and human rights advocacy organization
- Saint Maurice (died 287), French pronunciation transliterated into German "Moritz" or short, "Mohr"
- Turbah, a small clay tablet used by Shi'a Muslims during daily prayers

== See also ==
- Mohur (alternate spelling), a gold coin of South Asia
- Mohor (TV series), Indian television series
- Moor (disambiguation)
- Moore (disambiguation)
- More (disambiguation)
- More (surname)
- Moore
