= More =

More may refer to:

== Computing ==
- MORE (application), outline software for Mac OS
- more (command), a shell command
- MORE protocol, a routing protocol
- Missouri Research and Education Network

== Music ==
=== Albums ===
- More! (album), by Booka Shade, 2010
- More (soundtrack), by Pink Floyd with music from the 1969 film
- More... (Trace Adkins album), or the title song, 1999
- More (Mary Alessi album), 2005
- More (Beyoncé EP), 2014
- More (Michael Bublé EP), 2005
- More (Clarke-Boland Big Band album), 1968
- More (Double Dagger album), 2009
- More... (Montell Jordan album), 1996
- More (Matt Lang album), 2020
- More (Crystal Lewis album), 2001
- More (Giuseppi Logan album), 1966
- More (No Mercy album), 1998
- More (No Trend album), 2001
- More (Jeremy Riddle album), or the title song, 2017
- More (Pulp album), 2025
- More (Symphony Number One album), 2016
- More (Tamia album), or the title song, 2004
- More (Vitamin C album), 2001
- More, by Mylon LeFevre, 1983
- More, by Resin Dogs, 2007

=== Songs ===
- "More" (Alex Alstone and Tom Glazer song), popularized by Perry Como, 1956
- "More" (Alison Moyet song), 2003
- "More" (Carly Rae Jepsen song), 2025
- "More" (J-Hope song), 2022
- "More" (K/DA song), 2020
- "More" (Matthew West song), 2003
- "More" (Peaches song), 2009
- "More" (The Sisters of Mercy song), 1990
- "More" (Trace Adkins song), 2000
- "More" (Usher song), 2010
- "More" (Theme from Mondo Cane), from the 1963 film Mondo Cane
- "More", by 5 Seconds of Summer from Youngblood, 2018
- "More", by the Black Eyed Peas, performed on the Black Blue & You Tour, 2007
- "More", by Doctor and the Medics from I Keep Thinking It's Tuesday, 1987
- "More", by Grupa More, featuring Meri Cetinić, 1973
- "More", by Halsey from Manic, 2020
- "More", by Ice Prince from Fire of Zamani, 2012
- "More", by Illit from Break Even, 2026
- "More", by Junkie XL from More More, 2007
- "More", by Madonna from I'm Breathless, 1990
- "More", by Nebula from Atomic Ritual, 2003
- "More", by Sam Ryder from There's Nothing but Space, Man!, 2022
- "More", by Selena Gomez & the Scene from Kiss & Tell, 2009
- "More", by Yeat from 2093, 2024

=== Bands ===
- More (British band), a 1980s heavy metal band
- More, a 1980s Yugoslav band featuring Doris Dragović

== Places ==
- More, Shropshire, a location in the United Kingdom
- Möre, one of the original small lands of historical province Småland in southern Sweden

== Radio, film, and television ==
- More (1969 film), a film directed by Barbet Schroeder
- More (1998 film), a short film by Mark Osborne
- More (2017 film), a Turkish drama film
- More FM, a New Zealand radio network
- More Radio, an FM station in Swindon, North Wiltshire, UK
- "More", an episode of The Good Doctor

== Other uses ==
- more, an English comparative determiner
- More (surname), a family name, including a list of people with the surname
- More!, a British women's fashion magazine
- More (magazine), an American women's lifestyle magazine
- More (cigarette), a cigarette brand marketed to women
- More (store), a chain of supermarkets in India
- Morè (clan), a Maratha clan of India
- More (interjection), used in many Balkan languages
- Mòoré language or Moré, a language spoken primarily in Burkina Faso by the Mossi
- morebus, a bus brand operating around Bournemouth and Poole (England, UK)
- MORE Electric and Power Corporation, a Philippine electric power distribution company
- Mayors Organized for Reparations and Equity (MORE), a coalition of U.S. mayors committed to paying reparations to African American citizens of their cities

== See also ==
- Møre (disambiguation), name of districts in Scandinavia
- More, More, More (disambiguation)
- Moar (disambiguation)
- Mohr (disambiguation)
- Moor (disambiguation)
- Morė
- Moore (disambiguation)
- Mores
- Moores (disambiguation)
- MOR (disambiguation)
