= MOR =

MOR, Mor or Mór may refer to:

== Names and titles ==
- Mór (given name), a list of people named Mór or Mor
- Mor (surname), a list of people named Mor or Mór
- Mor (honorific), or Mar, in Syriac
- Mór, an Irish title for the Chief of the Name

== Media ==
- Middle of the road (radio format)
- MOR Entertainment, a new media radio network station in the Philippines owned by ABS-CBN Corporation, formerly known as MOR Philippines
- MOR Music TV (Cable TV)
- WMOR-TV, Florida, US
- M.O.R. (album), an album by Alabama 3
- "M.O.R.", a song by Blur
- "Mór", a 2023 song by Sigur Rós from Átta

== Science and technology ==
- Mid-ocean ridge
- Model order reduction, in mathematical simulations
- mu-Opioid receptor (μ-opioid receptor), in neuroscience
- Mor, a class of morphisms in category theory
- Mor, acidic organic surface in a podzol
- Multipath On-demand Routing in wireless sensor networks

== Language ==
- Mor language (Austronesian)
- Mor language (Papuan)
- mor, the ISO 639-3 code for the Moro language, spoken in the Nuba Mountains of Sudan

== Transport ==
- Ministry of Railways in some Commonwealth states
- MOR, the IATA code for Morristown Regional Airport in the state of Tennessee, US
- MOR, the National Rail code for Mortimer railway station in the county of Berkshire, UK
- Mordialloc railway station, Melbourne

== Other ==
- Battle of Mór, in the Hungarian Revolution of 1848
- MOR, the Chapman code for County of Moray, Scotland
- Mór, a town in Fejér County, Hungary
- MOR, the UNDP code for Morocco
- Mor River or Mayurakshi River, India
- Museum of the Rockies, Bozeman, Montana, US

== See also ==
- Middle of the road (disambiguation)
- Moor (disambiguation)
- Moore (disambiguation)
- More (disambiguation)
- Mayura (disambiguation)
