= Morro =

Morro (Spanish and Portuguese for "hill") or El Morro may refer to:

== Buildings ==
- El Morro mine, Atacama, Chile
- El Morro National Monument, New Mexico
- Morro del Tulcán, pyramid in Popayán, Cauca
- Castillo de los Tres Reyes Del Morro, sometimes called El Morro, a fortress guarding Havana Bay, Cuba
- Castillo San Felipe del Morro, historic castle in San Juan, Puerto Rico

== Geology ==
- Morro Rock, a volcanic plug located just off Morro Bay, California
- Isla El Morro, an island near Acapulco, Mexico
- Isla El Morro, a small island near Taboga Island, Panama

== Places ==
- Morro, Cape Verde, a village on the island of Maio
- Morro (Camerino), a civil parish of Camerino, Marche, Italy
- Morro (Foligno), a civil parish of Foligno, Umbria, Italy
- El Morro, New Mexico, United States, an unincorporated community

== Other ==
- Morro (plant)
- Microsoft Security Essentials, codenamed Morro
- Morro (Ninjago), a character in Ninjago

== See also ==
- Morra (disambiguation)
- Moro (disambiguation)
- Morro Castle (disambiguation)
