= Moar =

Moar may refer to:

- Moar Mound and Village Site, an archaeological site near Morrow, Ohio, US
- mOAR, a division of Seattle, Washington-based music label And/oar
- Mother of All Rallies (M.O.A.R.), a 2017 rally at the National Mall in Washington, D.C., in support of President Donald Trump

== People with the surname Moar ==
- Brendan Moar, Australian television presenter
- Kelly Moar, Provincial Court of Manitoba (Canada) judge
- Maud Adelaide Moar, wife of Prince Edward Island (Canada) judge Austin Levi Fraser
- May Moar (1825–1894), UK Lifeboat rescuer

== See also ==
- More (disambiguation)
