= Moros (disambiguation) =

Moros is the personification of impending doom and destruction in Greek mythology.

Moros may also refer to:

- Moros (Stargate), a character in the TV series Stargate SG-1 and Stargate Atlantis
- Moors in Spanish, applied by the Spanish to the Muslims they found in the Philippines
  - Moros (Philippines)
  - Moro National Liberation Front
- Moros, Spain, a municipality in the Spanish province of Zaragoza
- Moros, home planet of Keill Randor in The Last Legionary series of young adult science fiction novels
- Moros, a class of dreadnought capital ship in the massively multiplayer online game EVE Online
- Moroes, a boss mob in the massively multiplayer online role-playing game World of Warcraft
- The Moros, a path of Mages dealing especially with Death and Matter in the White Wolf RPG Mage: the Awakening
- Moros intrepidus, a species of small tyrannosauroid dinosaur from North America

== People with the surname ==
- Carlos Moros (born 1993), Spanish professional footballer
- Cristina Moros (born 1977), American former professional tennis player
- Helen Moros (1967–2003), New Zealand long-distance runner
- Nicolás Maduro Moros (born 1962), president of Venezuela
- Rebecca Moros (born 1985), American women's soccer player

== See also ==
- Moros y cristianos (disambiguation)
