= De Moor =

De Moor is a Dutch surname. It literally means "the Moor" and probably referred to the harbour master profession (to "moor" a boat). It may have also referred to a person with a darker skin, or more generally, a person with connections to the African continent. "De Moor" therefore meaning "The Dark Skinned People." Some notable people with that surname includes:

- Bien de Moor (born 1962), Belgian actress
- Bob de Moor (1925–1992), Belgian comics author
- Carel de Moor (1655–1738), Dutch etcher and painter, father of:
- Carel Isaak de Moor (1695–1738), Dutch lithographer and painter
- Des de Moor (1961–2026), English musician and writer
- Duncan de Moor (born 1994), also known as Duncan Laurence, Dutch musician
- Frans de Moor (1912–1983), Dutch boxer
- Georges De Moor (born 1953), Belgian Doctor of Medicine and professor
- Joos de Moor (c. 1548 – 1618), Dutch Vice Admiral
- Marente de Moor (born 1972), Dutch writer and columnist
- Margriet de Moor (born 1941), Dutch writer and pianist
- Ruud de Moor (1928–2001), Dutch professor of sociology
- Vincent de Moor (born 1973), Dutch trance artist

== See also ==
- Guido Demoor (1952–2006), Belgian train driver
- Moor (disambiguation)
