= More, More, More (disambiguation) =

"More, More, More" is a 1976 disco song by the Andrea True Connection.

More, More, More may also refer to:

== Music ==
- More, More, More (album), 1976 album by the Andrea True Connection
- More! More! More!, an album by Capsule, or the title song
- More, More, More of Nora Aunor, 1968 album by Nora Aunor
- "More, More, More" (Carmel song)
- "More, More, More", a song by Kylie Minogue from Fever

== Other uses ==
- More, More, More, 2007 short film by Blake Ritson
- More More More (Japanese: もっともっともっと, romanized: Motto Motto Motto), a 2003 manga graphic novel by Kazumi Kazui

== See also ==
- More and More (disambiguation)
- More (disambiguation)
