= Moro (surname) =

Moro is a surname of Italian descent. Notable people with the surname include:

- House of Moro, noble family of the Republic of Venice.
- Aldo Moro (1916–1978), Italian politician and prime minister
- Anabel Moro (born 1979), Argentine Paralympic swimmer
- Andrea Moro (born 1962) Italian linguist and neuroscientist
- Anton Moro (1687–1764) Italian geologist
- Berta Betanzos Moro (born 1988), Spanish Olympic sports sailor
- Cristoforo Moro (1390–1471), 67th Doge of Venice
- Daniel Moro (born 1973), Spanish Olympic water polo champion
- Ernst Moro (1874–1951), Austrian physician and pediatrician
- Fabio Moro (born 1975), Italian footballer
- Fabrizio Moro (born 1975), Italian singer
- Guerrino Moro (born 1982), Canadian Olympic athlete
- Iván Moro (born 1974), Spanish Olympic water polo champion
- Lisa Moro (born 1981), Australian Olympic artistic gymnast
- Manlio Moro (born 2002), Italian cyclist
- Marc Moro (born 1977), Canadian ice hockey player
- Maria Fida Moro (1946–2024), Italian politician
- Nikola Moro (born 1998), Croatian footballer
- Oscar Moro (1948–2006), Argentine rock musician
- Paola Moro (born 1952), Italian Olympic distance runner
- Peter Moro, CBE (1911–1998), German-British architect
- Rosangela Moro (born 1974), Brazilian politician
- Sara Moro (born 1984), Spanish Olympic artistic gymnast
- Sergio Moro (born 1972), Brazilian Minister for Justice and federal judge
- Simone Moro (born 1967), Italian mountain climber
- Stefanina Moro (1927–1944), Italian partisan

== See also ==
- Maro (name)
- Morrow (surname)
- Moreau (surname)
- Mauro (surname)
