= Moro =

Moro may refer to:

== Events ==
- Moro Crater massacre (1906), an engagement in the Philippine–American War
- Moro River Campaign (1943), a World War II campaign between Allied and German forces on the Moro river and its headwaters in Italy
- Moro War, any of numerous conflicts with the Moro people of the Philippines, starting in the 16th century.

== Ethnic groups ==
- Moro people, a mostly Muslim people of southern Philippines
- Moors, the English variation of the Spanish term moro referring to Muslim inhabitants of the Iberian Peninsula and North Africa during the Middle Ages
- Sri Lankan Moors or Ceylon Moors, an ethnic group
- Indian Moors, an ethnic group
- Moro people, also known as the Ayoreo people, an indigenous people of Bolivia and Paraguay
- Moro Nuba people, a subgroup of the Nuba people in southern Sudan
- Moroccans, shortened form or slang referring to people from Morocco, sometimes used among immigrant communities

== Languages ==
- Moro, an alternative name for the Ayoreo language, spoken in Peru and Bolivia
- Moro language (Nigeria), an East Kainji language spoken in Nigeria
- Moro language, a Kordofanian language spoken in southern Sudan by the Moro Nuba people
- Moru language, spoken in South Sudan by the Moru people

== Places ==
=== Africa ===
- Moro, Kwara, a Local Government Area in Kwara State
- Moro River (Mano River), a tributary of the Mano River in Sierra Leone and Liberia; see List of rivers of Sierra Leone

=== Asia ===
- Moro Station, Japanese railway station
- Moro, Pakistan, a city in Sindh province
- Moro Province, a former province of the Philippines
- Moro, a district of Karimun Regency, Riau Islands, Indonesia

=== Europe ===
- Moro (Italian river), a river in Italy
- Moro (Ribadesella), a parish of Ribadesella, Asturias, Spain
- Móró, the Hungarian name for Morău village, Cornești, Cluj, Romania

=== North America ===
- Moro, former name of Taft, California
- Moro, Oregon, the county seat of Sherman County, Oregon
- Moro Township, Madison County, Illinois, a township in Madison County, Illinois
- Moro, Illinois, an unincorporated community in Madison County, Illinois
- Moro Plantation, a plantation in Aroostook County, Maine

== Other uses ==
- Moro (chocolate bar), a brand of chocolate bar made by Cadbury
- Moro (surname), a surname
- Moro (Irgen Gioro), a Manchu grand secretary of Qing Empire
- Moro Movement, a social, political, and economic movement in the Solomon Islands
- Moro, a camouflage pattern formerly used by several Polish military formations
- Moro, a wolf-god in the Studio Ghibli animated film Princess Mononoke
- Moro, a cultivar of the blood orange
- Moro, a character in Dragon Ball Super series
- Moro, a character in 1988 Soviet film The Needle played by Viktor Tsoi

== See also ==
- Moor (disambiguation)
- Moros y cristianos (disambiguation)
