= Middle of the road =

Middle of the road may refer to:

- A synonym for political centrism
- A synonym for moderation or via media ("the middle road")

== Music ==
- Middle of the road (music), music style and radio format often abbreviated "MOR"
- Middle of the Road (band), 1970s Scottish pop band
- "Middle of the Road" (song), 1983 song by The Pretenders
- M.O.R. (album), 2007 album by Alabama
- "M.O.R.", 1997 song by Blur

== See also ==
- MOR (disambiguation)
