= Kohl v. United States =

- Supreme Court of the United States

Argued February 11, 1876 Decided March 27, 1876
- Full case name: Kohl, et al. v. United States
- Citations: 91 U.S. 367 (more) 23 L. Ed. 449, 1875 U.S. LEXIS 1378

Holding
- It is necessary for the government to be able to seize property for its uses, such as creating infrastructure, which ultimately are determined by the legislature and not the judiciary.

Court membership
- Chief Justice Morrison Waite Associate Justices Nathan Clifford · Noah H. Swayne; Samuel F. Miller · David Davis; Stephen J. Field · William Strong; Joseph P. Bradley · Ward Hunt

Case opinions
- Majority: Strong, joined by Waite, Clifford, Swayne, Miller, Davis, Bradley, Hunt
- Dissent: Field

Laws applied
- U.S. Const Amend. V

Kohl v. United States, 91 U.S. 367 (1875), was a court case that took place in the Supreme Court of the United States. It invoked the Fifth Amendment to the United States Constitution and is related to the issue of eminent domain.

== Facts of the case ==
Eminent domain was used to seize private property, with just compensation, for the construction of a post office, a customs building, and other government buildings in Cincinnati, Ohio.

== The Court’s ruling ==
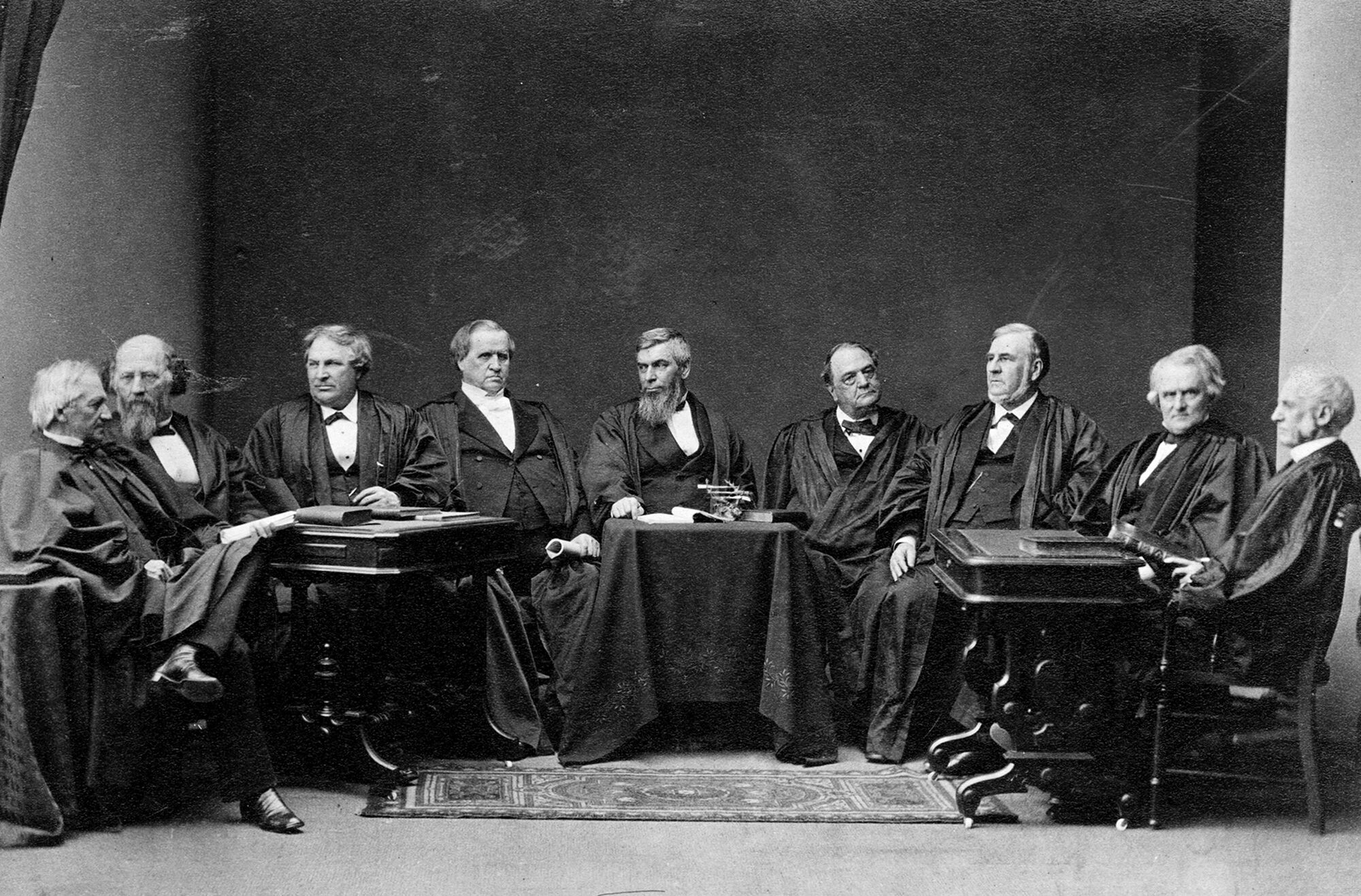
The Waite Court in 1876.

The court ruled that it is necessary for the government to be able to seize property for its uses, such as creating infrastructure, which ultimately are determined by the legislature and not the judiciary. This essentially gives the government ultimate ownership over all property, because it is not viable for the government to hold out against the obstinance of private individuals to appropriate land for government uses. This power of eminent domain is not only a privilege of the federal, but also state governments. While the petitioners protest that no act of the United States Congress was used to determine the details of the acquisition, the Court ruled such legislation appropriate but unnecessary; it did not prevent the right to acquire land from being vested in the United States Secretary of the Treasury. Another argument addressed is that the government can determine the value of the property, to “justly compensate” the individual property owners; the court ruled that the assessor of the property is determined by law, and as stands the property can be assessed by the government. There was also discussion, regarding the Court’s jurisdiction in this case to be accurate.

== Important quotations ==
=== Strong's opinion ===
“It has not been seriously contended during the argument that the United States government is without power to appropriate lands or other property within the States for its own uses, and to enable it to perform its proper functions. Such an authority is essential to its independent existence and perpetuity. These cannot be preserved if the obstinacy of a private person, or if any other authority, can prevent the acquisition of the means or instruments by which alone governmental functions can be performed.”
“The right of eminent domain was one of those means well known when the Constitution was adopted, and employed to obtain lands for public uses. …The Constitution itself contains an implied recognition of it beyond what may justly be implied from the express grants. The fifth amendment contains a provision that private property shall not be taken for public use without just compensation. What is that but an implied assertion, that, on making just compensation, it may be taken?”
“The time of its exercise may have been prescribed by statute; but the right itself was superior to any statute.”

=== Field’s dissent ===
“The Federal courts have no inherent jurisdiction of a proceeding instituted for the condemnation of property; and I do not find any statute of Congress conferring upon them such authority. The Judiciary Act of 1789 only invests the circuit courts of the United States with jurisdiction, concurrent with that of the State courts, of suits of a civil nature at common law or in equity; and these terms have reference to those classes of cases which are conducted by regular pleadings between parties, according to the established doctrines prevailing at the time in the jurisprudence of England.”

== See also ==
- List of United States Supreme Court cases, volume 91
- Chappell v. United States, 160 U.S. 499 (1896)
