= Moore v. United States =

Moore v. United States may refer to several United States Supreme Court cases:

- Moore v. United States, 555 U.S. 1 (2008)
- Moore v. United States, 602 U.S. 572 (2024)
- Moore v. United States, 91 U.S. 270 (1876)
- Moore v. United States, 150 U.S. 57 (1893)
- Moore v. United States, 160 U.S. 268 (1895)
- Moore v. United States, 196 U.S. 157 (1905)
- Moore v. United States, 249 U.S. 487 (1919)
- Moore v. United States, 429 U.S. 20 (1976)

== See also ==
- United States v. Moore
