= The Moor =

The Moor may refer to:

- Personification of the Moors, in their collective role as a medieval political force

== Geography ==
- The Moor, the core street of The Moor Quarter of Sheffield, England
- The Moor, Hawkhurst, the green within The Moor Quarter's village and civil parish, England

== Arts and entertainment ==
- Othello (character), often referred to as "The Moor"
- The Moor (novel), a 1998 novel by L. R. King
- "The Moor", a song by Opeth from the 1999 album Still Life
- "The Moor" (The Borgias) (2011), an episode of the television series
- The Moor (film), a 2024 British mystery horror drama film

== Other uses ==
- Karl Marx (1818–1883), German philosopher and communist nicknamed "The Moor" by family and friends because of his darker complexion

== See also ==
- Moor (disambiguation)
