= Morro Castle =

Morro Castle may refer to:

== Fortress ==
- Castillo de los Tres Reyes Del Morro, also known as Morro Castle, a fortress guarding Havana Bay, Cuba
- Castillo San Felipe del Morro, a fortress in San Juan, Puerto Rico
- Castillo de San Pedro de la Roca, also called "Castillo del Morro" ("Morro Castle"), a fortress guarding Santiago, Cuba

== Ship ==
- SS Morro Castle (1900), passenger liner of the Ward Line
- SS Morro Castle (1930), passenger liner that burned in 1934

== See also ==
- Morro (disambiguation)
