= Mekale McKay =

American football player, wide receiver (born 1993)

Profile
- Position: Wide receiver

Personal information
- Born: August 4, 1993 (age 33); Louisville, Kentucky, U.S.
- Listed height: 6 ft 4 in (1.93 m)
- Listed weight: 210 lb (95 kg)

Career information
- High school: Moore Traditional (KY)
- College: Arkansas (2012); Cincinnati (2013–2015)
- NFL draft: 2016: undrafted

Career history

Playing
- Indianapolis Colts (2016)*; Jacksonville Jaguars (2016)*; Denver Broncos (2017)*; Tennessee Titans (2017)*; Chicago Bears (2017)*; Dallas Cowboys (2018)*; San Antonio Commanders (2019); New York Guardians (2020); Winnipeg Blue Bombers (2020–2021)*
- * Offseason or practice squad member only

Coaching
- Moore Traditional High School (2023-present) Head coach
- Stats at Pro Football Reference

Mekale McKay (born August 4, 1993) is an American former professional football wide receiver. He is the current head coach at Marion C. Moore School. He was a member of the Indianapolis Colts, Jacksonville Jaguars, Denver Broncos, Tennessee Titans, Chicago Bears, and Dallas Cowboys of the National Football League (NFL), the San Antonio Commanders of the Alliance of American Football (AAF), the New York Guardians of the XFL, and the Winnipeg Blue Bombers of the Canadian Football League (CFL). He played college football at the University of Arkansas before transferring to the University of Cincinnati.

== Early life ==
Mckay attended Moore Traditional High School, where he played football and basketball. As a junior, he received All-district and All-region honors. As a senior, he posted 38 receptions for 894 yards and 13 touchdowns, receiving All-district and honorable-mention All-state honors.

== College career ==
McKay accepted a football scholarship from the University of Arkansas. As a true freshman, he appeared in 12 games (10 starts), making 21 receptions (tied for fourth on the team) for 317 yards (second on the team) and 2 touchdowns. He transferred to the University of Cincinnati after his freshman season.

As a sophomore in 2013, he didn't need to sit out the season to comply with the NCAA transfer rules, because he was granted circumstances of hardship associated with the reason for the transfer. He appeared in 10 games, registering 16 receptions for 485 yards (fourth on the team) and 7 touchdowns.

As a junior, he collected 44 receptions (third on the team) for 725 yards (second on the team) and 8 touchdowns.

As a senior, he appeared in 11 out of 12 games. He recorded 27 receptions for 507 yards (fourth on the team) and 2 touchdowns. He made 2 receptions for 105 yards (including an 88-yard touchdown) against Temple University. He had 4 receptions for 91 yards and one touchdown against the University of Miami. He had 6 receptions for 101 yards against the University of Tulsa.

== Professional career ==
=== NFL ===
Pre-draft measurables
Height	Weight	Arm length	Hand span	40-yard dash	10-yard split	20-yard split	20-yard shuttle	Three-cone drill	Vertical jump	Broad jump	Bench press
6 ft 3 5/8 in (1.92 m)	207 lb (94 kg)	30 5/8 in (0.78 m)	9 1/2 in (0.24 m)	4.55 s	1.53 s	2.69 s	4.29 s	7.08 s	37.5 in (0.95 m)	10 ft 3 in (3.12 m)	12 reps

McKay was signed as an undrafted free agent by the Indianapolis Colts after the 2016 NFL draft on May 2. He was waived on September 3. On November 29, he was signed to the Jacksonville Jaguars' practice squad.

On January 11, 2017, he was signed by the Denver Broncos to a reserve/future contract. He was cut on May 4. On June 6, he was signed as a free agent by the Tennessee Titans. He was released on August 31. On December 20, he was signed to the Chicago Bears' practice squad.

On January 1, 2018, he signed a reserve/future contract with the Chicago Bears. He was released on April 19. On May 30, he was signed as a free agent by the Dallas Cowboys. He was released on September 1.

=== San Antonio Commanders ===
On January 4, 2019, he signed with the San Antonio Commanders of the Alliance of American Football. He played with the team in 7 games, until the league ceased operations in April. He had 22 receptions for 375 yards (17-yard avg.) and 4 touchdowns, as well as a 2-point conversion catch.

=== New York Guardians ===
In October 2019, he was selected by the New York Guardians in the second round of the phase 1 of the 2020 XFL draft. He was named the starter at wide receiver for the season opener. In March, amid the COVID-19 pandemic, the league announced that it would be cancelling the rest of the season. Playing in all 5 games, he registered 12 receptions for 184 yards and one touchdown. He had his contract terminated when the league suspended operations on April 10, 2020.

=== Winnipeg Blue Bombers ===
On June 11, 2020, McKay signed with the Winnipeg Blue Bombers of the Canadian Football League. After having two leagues he played in shut down in two consecutive years, McKay stated to the Bombers, "What a better spot for me than with a team with a championship pedigree and a young receiving corps?". He did not have a chance to play with the team after the CFL announced on August 17, that the 2020 season had been cancelled due to the COVID-19 pandemic in Canada, ongoing restrictions on public gatherings, and the league's inability to secure federal funding to cover the money lost from not having fans in the stands. McKay was placed on the suspended list on July 9, 2021.
