= Moore High School =

Moore High School may refer to:

- Bishop Moore High School, Orlando, Florida
- Moore Traditional High School, Louisville, Kentucky
- Moore High School (Montana), Moore, Montana
- Moore Catholic High School, Staten Island, New York
- North Moore High School, Robbins, North Carolina
- Moore High School (Oklahoma), Moore, Oklahoma
- Moore County High School, Moore County, Tennessee
- Ingram Tom Moore High School, Ingram, Texas
- Newton Moore Senior High School, Perth, Western Australia

== See also ==
- Moor High School, Starkville, Mississippi
