= Pasquale Malipiero =

Doge of Venice from 1457 to 1462

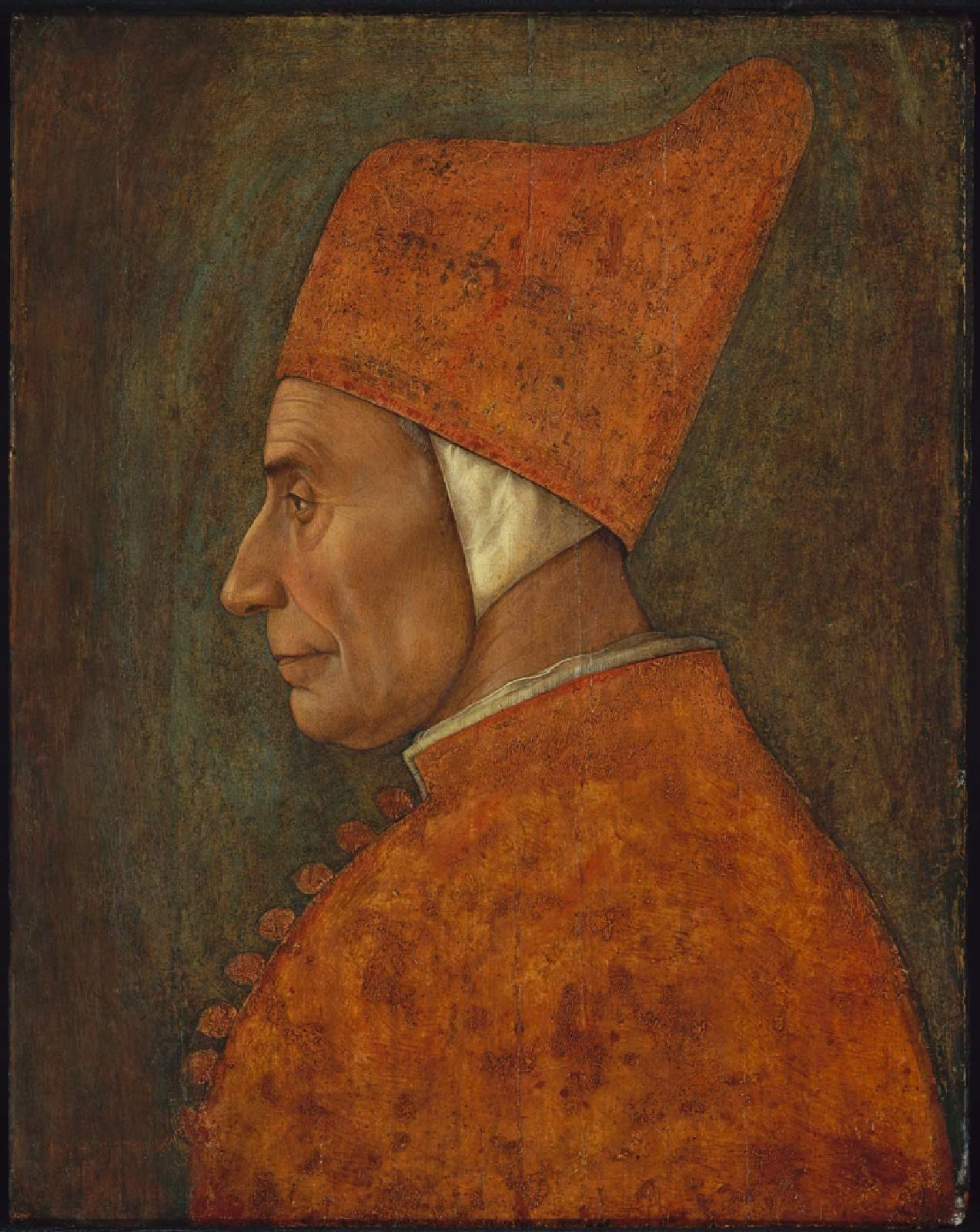
- Gentile Bellini, Portrait of the doge Pasquale Malipiero.

Doge of Venice
- In office 1457–1462
- Preceded by: Francesco Foscari
- Succeeded by: Cristoforo Moro

Personal details
- Born: 1392 Venice, Republic of Venice
- Died: 5 May 1462 (aged 69–70) Venice

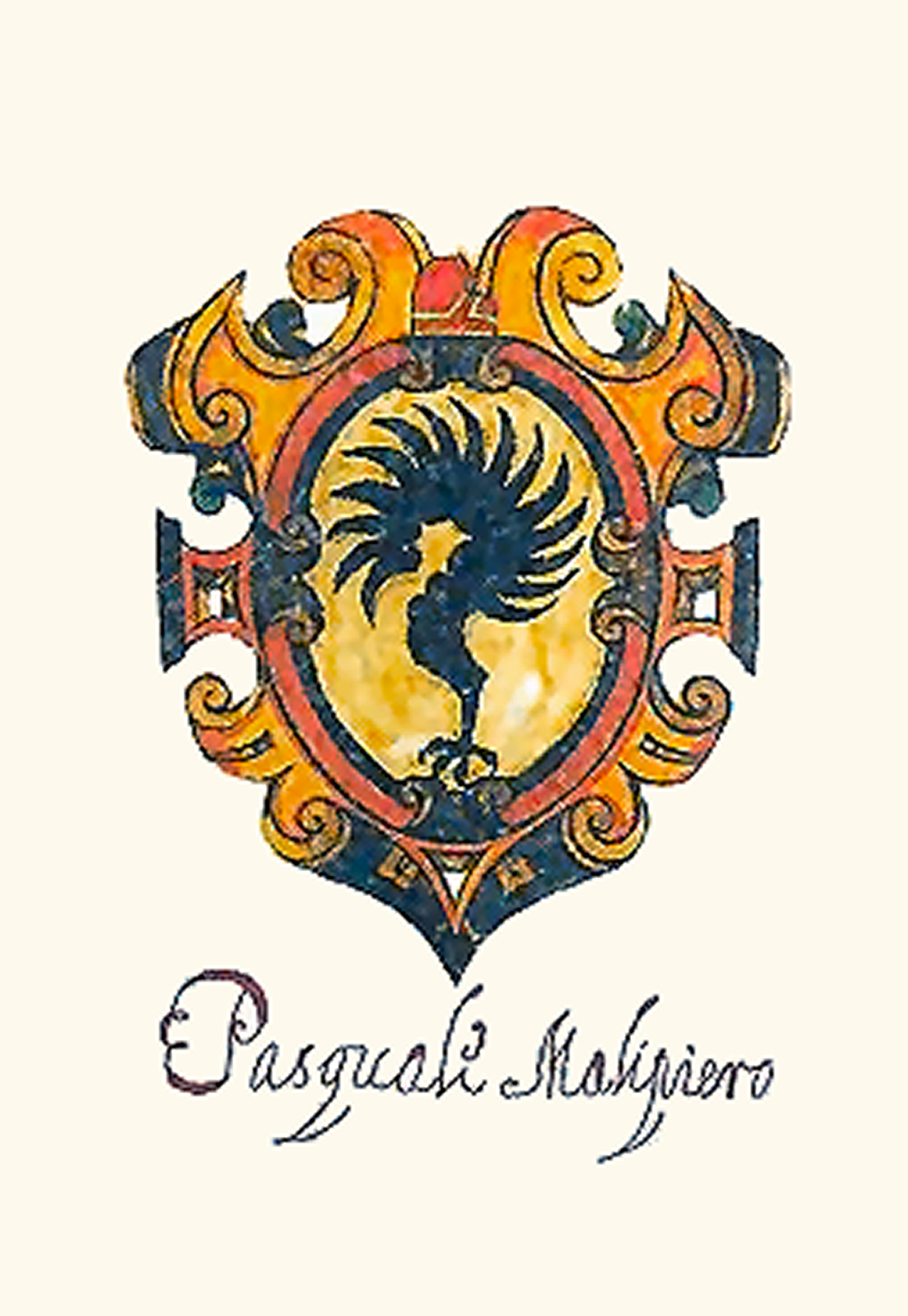
Coat of arms of Pasquale Malipiero

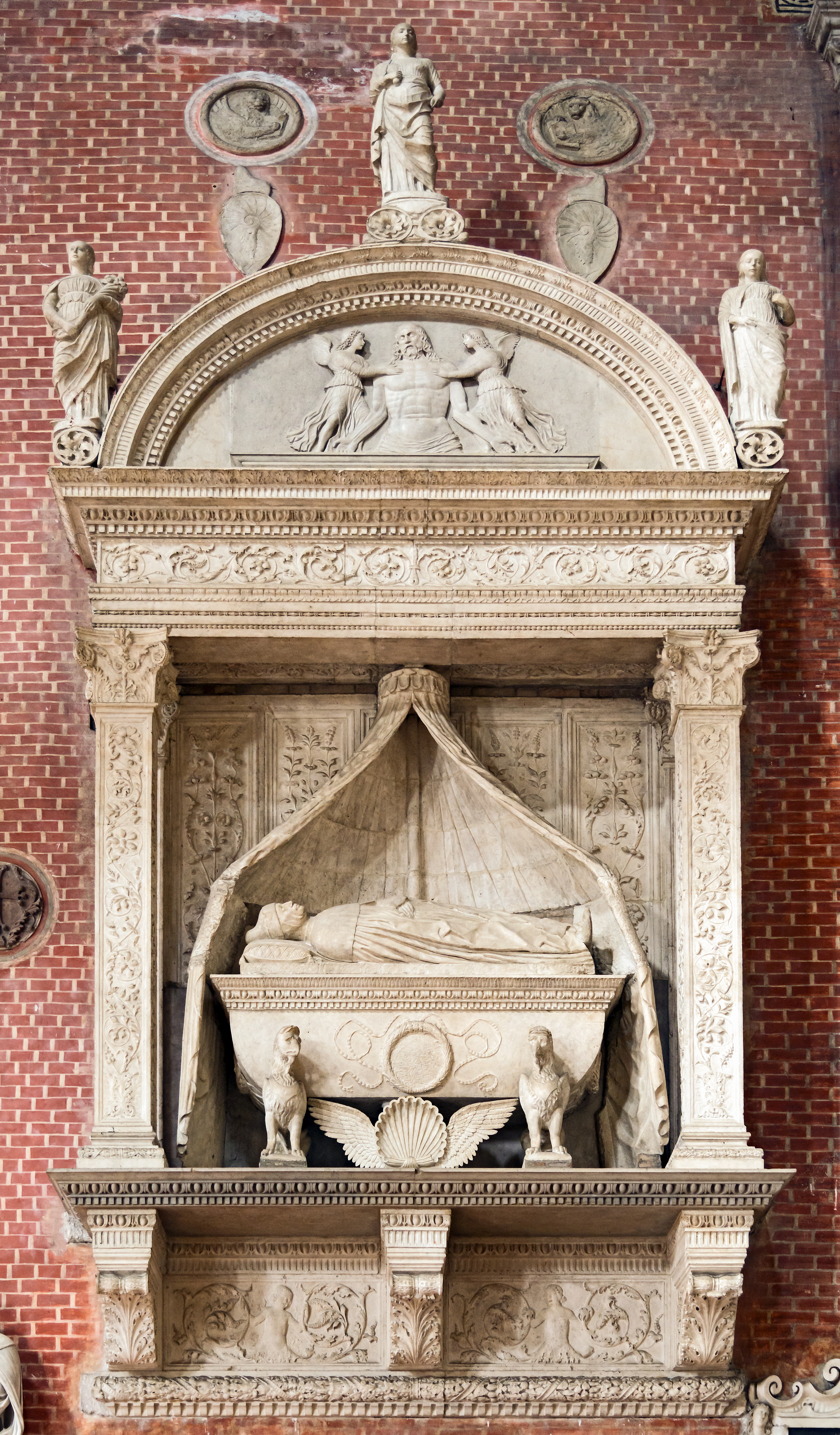
Monument In San Giovanni e Paolo

Pasquale Malipiero, called the dux pacificus (1392 in Venice – May 5, 1462 in Venice) was a Venetian statesman who served as the 66th Doge of Venice from October 30, 1457 until his death. He succeeded Francesco Foscari, and was specifically elected by enemies of the Foscari family. In 1458, he signed into law a number of measures limiting the power of the Council of Ten.

Malipiero was interred in the Basilica di San Giovanni e Paolo, a traditional burial place of the doges. He was succeeded as Doge by Cristoforo Moro.

Pasquale was married to Giovanna Dandolo.

Political offices
Preceded by Francesco Foscari	Doge of Venice; 1457–1462	Succeeded by Cristoforo Moro
