= Mohr (surname) =

Mohr is a surname of German origin. Notable people with the surname include:

- Alexander Mohr (1892–1974), German artist
- Bärbel Mohr (1964–2010), German author
- Bill Mohr (1909–1971), Australian footballer
- Charles Mohr (botanist) (1824–1901), German-American botanical writer
- Charles Mohr (journalist) (1929–1989), American writer for Time
- Christopher Garrett Mohr (born 1966), American football player
- Christian Otto Mohr (1835–1918), German civil engineer
- Clinton Mohr (born 1966), Australian rugby player
- Daniel Matthias Heinrich Mohr (1780–1808), German botanist
- Dustan Mohr (born 1976), American baseball player
- Erna Mohr (1894–1968), German zoologist
- Ernst Mohr (1910–1989), German mechanical engineer
- Georg Mohr (1640–1697), Danish mathematician
- Georg Mohr (chess player) (born 1965), Slovenian chess grandmaster
- Gerald Mohr (1914–1968), American actor
- Hal Mohr (1894–1974), American cinematographer
- Heidi Mohr (born 1967), German football player
- Herbert Mohr (born 1988), German politician
- Herta Mohr (1914–1945), Austrian-born Egyptologist
- Howard R. Mohr (1921–1977), American politician and businessman
- Jacqueline J. Mohr, American marketeer
- Jay Mohr (born 1970), American actor and comedian
- Jean Mohr (1925–2018), Swiss documentary photographer
- Johann Georg Mohr (1864–1943), German painter
- Johan Maurits Mohr (1716–1775), Dutch-German astronomer
- John P. Mohr (1910–1997), American FBI administrator
- Joseph Hermann Mohr (1834–1892), German Jesuit and hymnodist
- Joseph Mohr (1792–1848), Austrian priest and composer
- Karl Friedrich Mohr (1806–1879), German pharmacist
- Lawrence B. Mohr (born 1931), American political scientist
- Manfred Mohr (born 1938), German digital art pioneer
- Morris Mohr (1907–1956), American politician from New York
- Niklas Mohr (born 2004), German footballer
- Philipp Mohr (born 1972), German architect and industrial designer
- Richard Mohr (1919–2002), American recording producer
- Robert Mohr (1897–1977), Gestapo interrogation specialist
- Robert Mohr (rugby) (born 1978), German rugby player
- Sigismund Mohr (1827–1893), Canadian electrical engineer
- Stefan Mohr (born 1967), German chess grandmaster
- Thomas Mohr (politician), American politician
- Thomas Mohr (tenor) (born 1961), German tenor and academic teacher
- Tim Mohr (1969 or 1970–2025), German-American writer, translator and book editor
- Tim Mohr (footballer) (born 1988), Australian footballer
- Tobias Mohr (born 1995), German football player
- Wilhelm Mohr (aviator) (1917–2016), Norwegian aviator and officer
- Wilhelm Mohr (journalist) (1838–1888), German journalist
- Wilhelm Mohr (politician) (1886–1978), Norwegian politician

== See also ==
- Mor (surname)
