= J. J. Weaver =

American football player (born 1999)

Profile
- Position: Outside linebacker

Personal information
- Born: November 30, 1999 (age 26); Fort Lauderdale, Florida, U.S.
- Listed height: 6 ft 5 in (1.96 m)
- Listed weight: 250 lb (113 kg)

Career information
- High school: Moore Traditional (Louisville, Kentucky)
- College: Kentucky (2019–2024)
- NFL draft: 2025: undrafted

Career history
- Carolina Panthers (2025)*
- * Offseason or practice squad member only
- Stats at Pro Football Reference

J. J. Weaver (born November 30, 1999) is an American professional football outside linebacker. He played college football for the Kentucky Wildcats.

== Early life ==
Weaver grew up in Fort Lauderdale, Florida before moving to Louisville, Kentucky before starting high school. He attended Moore Traditional School. As a senior, he had 70 tackles with 10 sacks and three interceptions. Weaver committed to play college football at Kentucky over offers from Louisville, Miami, and Purdue.

== College career ==
Weaver played in three games during his true freshman season and maintained a redshirt. He had 33 tackles with 6.5 tackles for loss during his redshirt freshman year. Weaver tore his ACL in Kentucky's game against Florida and missed the rest of the season. He returned the next season and had 33 tackles with 10.5 tackles for loss and led the Wildcats with 6.5 sacks.

== Professional career ==
Pre-draft measurables
Height	Weight	Arm length	Hand span	40-yard dash	10-yard split	20-yard split	20-yard shuttle	Three-cone drill	Vertical jump	Broad jump	Bench press
6 ft 4 5/8 in (1.95 m)	251 lb (114 kg)	33 3/8 in (0.85 m)	9 1/8 in (0.23 m)	4.86 s	1.67 s	2.75 s	4.78 s	7.40 s	31.0 in (0.79 m)	9 ft 4 in (2.84 m)	26 reps
All values from Pro Day

Weaver signed with the Carolina Panthers as an undrafted free agent on July 25, 2025. He was waived on August 25.

== Personal life ==
Weaver was born with six fingers on his right hand.
