= More (surname) =

Persons with the surname More, Moré or Mores include:

- Antonis Mor (c. 1517–1577), Dutch painter
- Anthony More (musician) (born 1948), British musician
- Diva More, Brazilian drag queen
- Edward Rowe Mores (1731–1778), the first person to use the title actuary in relation to insurance mathematicians
- Gaurav More (born 1998), Indian actor and comedian
- Ellen More (active 1504–1527), servant at the Scottish royal court
- George More (recusant) (born 1542) English supporter of Mary, Queen of Scots
- George More (1553–1662), English politician
- George More (footballer), Scottish footballer
- Hamish More (1940–2022), Scottish cricketer
- Hannah More (1745–1833), English writer and philanthropist
- Henry More (1614–1687), English philosopher of the Cambridge Platonist school
- Karren More, American materials scientist
- Katherine More (1586–?), mother of Mayflower child Richard More
- Kenneth More (1914–1982), British actor
- Kiran More (born 1962), Indian cricketer
- Prabhakar More (politician), Indian politician
- Prabhakar More, Indian actor and comedian
- Pranit More (born 1991), Indian stand-up comedian
- Richard More (cricketer) (1879–1936), English cricketer and colonial administrator
- The More children: Ellen, Jasper, Mary and their brother,
- Richard More (Mayflower passenger) (1614–c. 1694/1696)
- Samuel More (1593–1662), involved in two separate controversies in England
- Thomas More (1478–1535), English lawyer, author, statesman, and Catholic martyr
- Benny Moré (1919–1963), famous Cuban singer
- Marquis de Mores (1858–1896), frontier ranchman in the Badlands of Dakota Territory during the final years of the American Old West era
- Theocharis Mores (1927–1992), Greek painter

== See also ==
- Mohr (surname)
- Moor (disambiguation)
- Moore (surname)
- Mor (surname)
- Morè (clan)
- Henri Le More
