= Moor End =

Moor End may refer to two places in England:

- Moor End, County Durham, an area of Belmont parish
- Moor End, Buckinghamshire, a hamlet in Lane End parish

== See also ==
- Moor (disambiguation)
