= More and More =

More and More or More & More may refer to:

- More & More (EP), a 2020 EP by Twice
  - "More & More" (Twice song)
- "More and More" (Captain Hollywood Project song)
- "More and More" (Fleur East song)
- "More & More" (Joe song) (2003)
- "More and More" (Webb Pierce song)
- "More and More" (Andy Williams song)
- "More and More", a song by Blood Sweat & Tears from Blood, Sweat & Tears
- "More and More", a song by Israel & New Breed from Jesus at the Center: Live
- "More and More", a song by Diana Ross from Eaten Alive
- "More and More", a song written by Jerome Kern and Yip Harburg, from the 1944 musical Can't Help Singing
- More & More German ready-to-wear brand
