= Moor =

Moor or Moors may refer to:

== Nature and ecology ==
- Moorland, a habitat characterized by low-growing vegetation and acidic soils.

== People ==
- Moor (surname)
- Moors, Muslim inhabitants of the Maghreb, Iberian Peninsula, Sicily, and Malta during the Middle Ages
- Moors, a variant name for Melungeon (racial isolate groups) in colonial North America
- Sri Lankan Moor, a minority Muslim group in Sri Lanka
- United Nuwaubian Nation of Moors, an American religious group founded and led by Dwight York, which includes (among others) Yamassee Native American Moors of the Creek Nation

== Places ==
- Moor, Nevada, United States
- Moor, the German spelling of Mór, a town in Fejér county, Hungary
- Moor Island, Nunavut, Canada an uninhabited island

== Animals ==
- Black Telescope (or Black Moor), a variety of goldfish
- Moor frog, native to Europe and Asia

== Arts and entertainment ==
- Moor (film), a 2015 Pakistani drama by Jamshed Mehmood
- Berber the Moor, a character in The Bastard Executioner
- "Moor", a song from the album From Parts Unknown by American metalcore band Every Time I Die

== Other uses ==
- Mooring, any permanent structure to which a vessel may be secured
- Massive online open research
- Moors Sundry Act of 1790, an advisory resolution passed by South Carolina House of Representatives, clarifying the status of free subjects of the Sultan of Morocco
- Moors, athletic nickname of Alhambra High School (Alhambra, California)

== See also ==
- The Moor (disambiguation)
- Moor Crichel, a village in southwest England
- Lower Moor, a village in Worcestershire, England
- De Moor, a Dutch surname
- Moor End (disambiguation)
- Red Moors, a Sardinian political party
- Moore (disambiguation)
- MOR (disambiguation)
- Mór (disambiguation)
- More (disambiguation)
- Moro (disambiguation)
- More (surname)
