= Moore Township =

Moore Township may refer to:

== Kansas ==
- Moore Township, Barber County, Kansas
- Moore Township, Marion County, Kansas

== Michigan ==
- Moore Township, Michigan

== Minnesota ==
- Moore Township, Stevens County, Minnesota

== Missouri ==
- Moore Township, Shannon County, Missouri
- Moore Township, Oregon County, Missouri

== North Dakota ==
- Moore Township, Ransom County, North Dakota, in Ransom County, North Dakota

== Pennsylvania ==
- Moore Township, Pennsylvania, in Northampton County, Pennsylvania

== South Dakota ==
- Moore Township, Charles Mix County, South Dakota, in Charles Mix County, South Dakota
