= Giovanni Moro (1406–1456) =

Venetian patrician, merchant and politician

Giovanni Moro (c. 1406 – in or after 1456) was a Venetian patrician, merchant and politician, who served the Republic of Venice as administrator and ambassador.

== Life ==
Giovanni Moro was the second son of Antonio Moro and Agnesina. His early years are virtually unknown, but he was likely born in 1406. Determining his career is further difficult on account of the existence of a namesake cousin, who nevertheless appears to have been far less prominent. On his father's side, Giovanni was related to the Doge Cristoforo Moro (r. 1462–1471).

Giovanni is first attested in 1431, when he was elected as an advocate in the Curia del Proprio court. Over the next years he dedicated himself to commercial activities, both in the east (Tanais, Cyprus, Alexandria) and in the west (Aigues-Mortes, Flanders), no doubt aided by his marriage in 1438 to Elena Priuli, daughter of one of the most prominent and wealthiest patrician families of Venice.

In his political career, Giovanni was elected ambassador to Siena in 1451–52, with the task of concluding an alliance against the Duchy of Milan. This was followed by election as Savio di Terraferma, but his tenure was cut short as he was sent as ambassador to Borso d'Este of Ferrara and King Alfonso of Naples in 1453. Moro exhibited great energy in the post, conducting trade negotiations, keeping an eye on the Balkans, where the Ottoman Empire was advancing, and trying to pressure Alfonso into a more active participation in the war against Milan. The Treaty of Lodi, concluded without Alfonso's knowledge, temporarily soured relations between the king and Moro, but when the latter left Naples in early 1455, the king knighted him in token of his esteem. Back in Venice, he served as Savio di Terraferma in 1455–1456, after which his fate is unknown; he most likely died in late 1456.

== Sources ==
- Gullino, Giuseppe (2012). "MORO, Giovanni". Dizionario Biografico degli Italiani (in Italian). Vol. 77: Morlini–Natolini. Rome: Institute of the Italian Encyclopaedia. ISBN 978-88-12-00032-6.
