= Karren More =

American materials scientist

Karren Leslie More
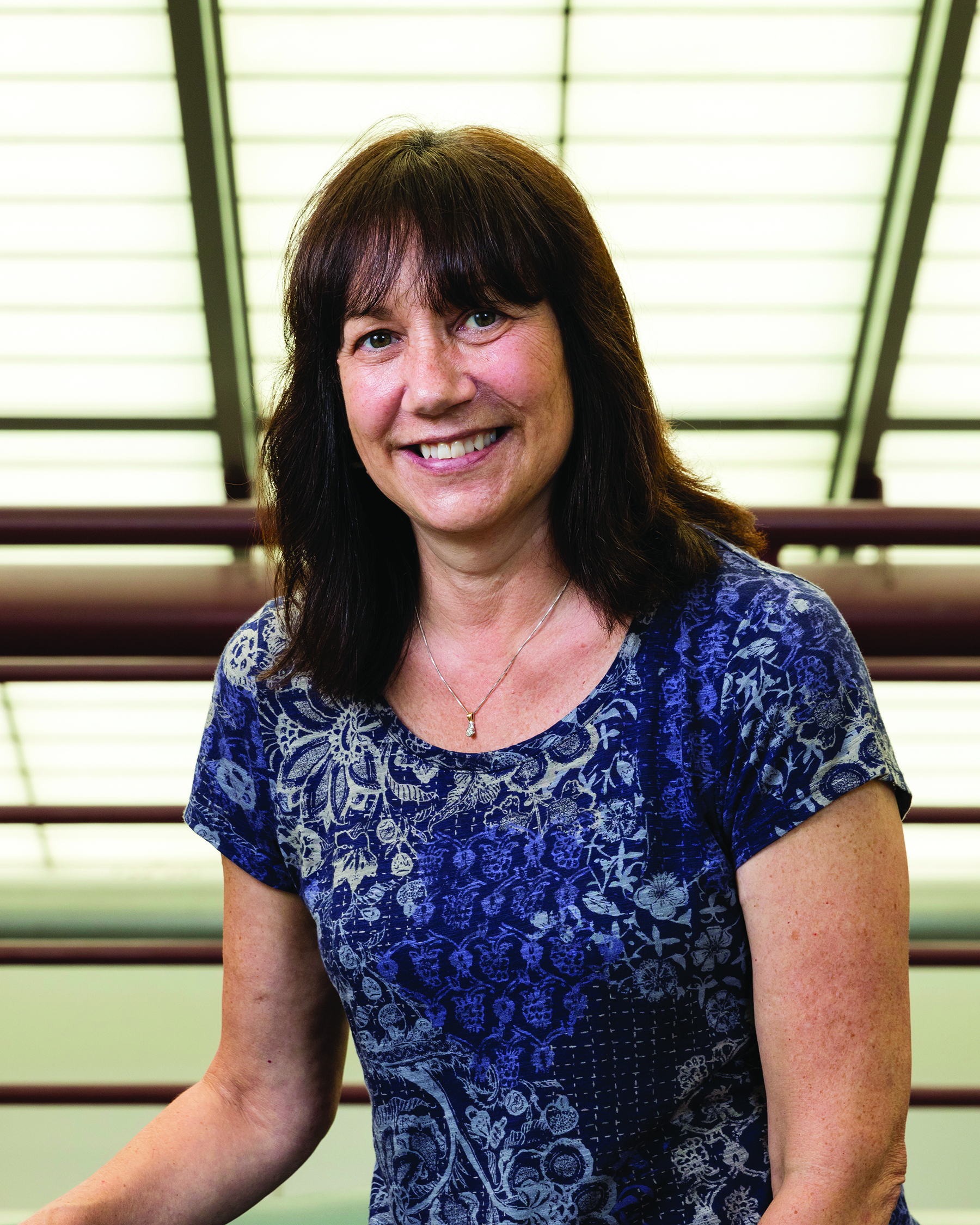
- More at the Oak Ridge National Laboratory in 2016
- Education: North Carolina State University
- Scientific career
- Workplaces: Oak Ridge National Laboratory
- Thesis: Transmission electron microscopy of CVD (alpha)-Si₃N₄ and SiC whisker-reinforced Si₃N₄ before and after creep deformation (1992)

Karren L. More is an American materials scientist who is the Director of the Center for Nanophase Materials Sciences at the Oak Ridge National Laboratory. Her research considers advanced electron microscopy as a probe to understand the structure and chemistry of emerging materials. More is a Fellow of the American Ceramic Society and Microscopy Society of America.

== Early life and education ==
More earned her undergraduate degree and doctorate at North Carolina State University, where she worked under the supervision of Robert F. Davis. Her undergraduate course focused on civil engineering. She was the first person in her family to attend college, and became interested in what materials looked like at the nanoscale. She was later elected to the University's Hall of Fame. She started working at the Oak Ridge National Laboratory as a visiting researcher.

== Research and career ==
More joined the High Temperature Materials Laboratory (HTML) at the Oak Ridge National Laboratory in 1998. She was responsible for overseeing the Shared Research Equipment Program. Her research considers high-resolution electron microscopy of structural ceramics, polymer fuel cells and nanoparticle catalysts. She looks to correlate information about microstructure or composition with in situ testing. Through these experiments, she seeks to understand catalyst coarsening, carbon corrosion and membrane degradation.

In 2013, More was made group leader of the Electron & Atom Probe Microscopy Group, which she led for several years. In 2019, she was named Director of the Center for Nanophase Materials Sciences.

== Awards and honors ==
- 2007 Elected Fellow of the American Ceramic Society
- 2010 R&D 100 Award Team Member
- 2013 DOE Hydrogen and Fuel Cells Program Research & Development Award
- 2019 Elected Fellow of the Microscopy Society of America

== Selected publications ==
- Gang Wu; Karren L. More; Christina M Johnston; Piotr Zelenay (1 April 2011). "High-performance electrocatalysts for oxygen reduction derived from polyaniline, iron, and cobalt". Science. 332 (6028): 443–447. doi:10.1126/science.1200832. ISSN 0036-8075. PMID 21512028. Wikidata Q53252582.
- Rod Borup; Jeremy Meyers; Bryan Pivovar; et al. (October 2007). "Scientific Aspects of Polymer Electrolyte Fuel Cell Durability and Degradation". Chemical Reviews. 107 (10): 3904–3951. doi:10.1021/cr050182l. ISSN 0009-2665. PMID 17850115. Wikidata Q30047360.
- Peter Strasser; Shirlaine Koh; Toyli Anniyev; et al. (25 April 2010). "Lattice-strain control of the activity in dealloyed core-shell fuel cell catalysts". Nature Chemistry. 2 (6): 454–460. doi:10.1038/nchem.623. ISSN 1755-4330. PMID 20489713. Wikidata Q39871291.
