= Mor (surname) =

Mor or Mór is a surname which may refer to:

- Alexandra Mor, American jewellery designer
- Antonis Mor (c. 1517–1577), Netherlandish portrait painter
- Benjamin Mor, half of the rapper duo Blood of Abraham and producer
- Caiseal Mór, Australian fantasy novelist
- Eduard Mor (born 1977), Russian footballer
- Emre Mor (born 1997), Turkish footballer
- Iris Mor (1952–2017), Israeli newspaper editor, literary editor and writer
- Keren Mor (born 1964), Israeli actress and comedian
- Lior Mor (born 1976), Israeli tennis player
- Rina Mor (born 1956), Israeli model and Miss Universe

== See also ==
- Mohr (surname)
- More (surname)
