= Isla El Morro =

El Morro
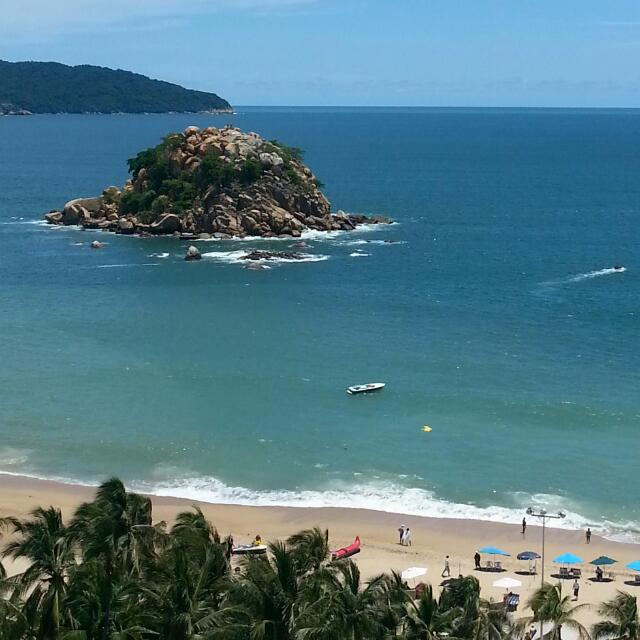
- El Morro Island from Condesa Beach
- Interactive map of El Morro

Geography
- Coordinates: 16°51′18.09″N 99°52′26.35″W

Administration
- Mexico

Demographics
- Population: 0

Isla El Morro, Isla del Morro or Farallón del Obispo is a small, rocky island in Acapulco Bay, off the beach Playa Condesa.

At the northern side is a landing. From there, along a collapsing staircase, the highest point can be reached, where eroding installations of a former fountain from the 1980s can be found.

== See also ==
- Acapulco Bay
- Morro Bay, California
