= List of United States Supreme Court cases, volume 91 =

Supreme Court of the United States
- Interactive map of Supreme Court of the United States
- 38°53′26″N 77°00′16″W
- Established: March 4, 1789; 236 years ago
- Location: Washington, D.C.
- Coordinates: 38°53′26″N 77°00′16″W
- Composition method: Presidential nomination with Senate confirmation
- Authorised by: Constitution of the United States, Art. III, § 1
- Judge term length: life tenure, subject to impeachment and removal
- Number of positions: 9 (by statute)
- Website: supremecourt.gov

This is a list of cases reported in volume 91 of United States Reports, decided by the Supreme Court of the United States in 1875 and 1876.

== Justices of the Supreme Court at the time of 91 U.S. ==
The Supreme Court is established by Article III, Section 1 of the Constitution of the United States, which says: "The judicial Power of the United States, shall be vested in one supreme Court . . .". The size of the Court is not specified; the Constitution leaves it to Congress to set the number of justices. Under the Judiciary Act of 1789 Congress originally fixed the number of justices at six (one chief justice and five associate justices). Since 1789 Congress has varied the size of the Court from six to seven, nine, ten, and back to nine justices (always including one chief justice).

When the cases in 91 U.S. were decided the Court comprised the following nine members:

Portrait	Justice	Office	Home State	Succeeded	Date confirmed by the Senate (Vote)	Tenure on Supreme Court
	Morrison Waite	Chief Justice	Ohio	Salmon P. Chase	January 21, 1874 (63–0)	March 4, 1874 – March 23, 1888 (Died)
	Nathan Clifford	Associate Justice	Maine	Benjamin Robbins Curtis	January 12, 1858 (26–23)	January 21, 1858 – July 25, 1881 (Died)
	Noah Haynes Swayne	Associate Justice	Ohio	John McLean	January 24, 1862 (38–1)	January 27, 1862 – January 24, 1881 (Retired)
	Samuel Freeman Miller	Associate Justice	Iowa	Peter Vivian Daniel	July 16, 1862 (Acclamation)	July 21, 1862 – October 13, 1890 (Died)
	David Davis	Associate Justice	Illinois	John Archibald Campbell	December 8, 1862 (Acclamation)	December 10, 1862 – March 4, 1877 (Resigned)
	Stephen Johnson Field	Associate Justice	California	newly created seat	March 10, 1863 (Acclamation)	May 10, 1863 – December 1, 1897 (Retired)
	William Strong	Associate Justice	Pennsylvania	Robert Cooper Grier	February 18, 1870 (No vote recorded)	March 14, 1870 – December 14, 1880 (Retired)
	Joseph P. Bradley	Associate Justice	New Jersey	newly created seat	March 21, 1870 (46–9)	March 23, 1870 – January 22, 1892 (Died)
	Ward Hunt	Associate Justice	New York	Samuel Nelson	December 11, 1872 (Acclamation)	January 9, 1873 – January 27, 1882 (Retired)

== Notable Case in 91 U.S. ==
=== Kohl v. United States ===
Kohl v. United States, 91 U.S. 367 (1875), involved the power of eminent domain. The Supreme Court ruled that it is necessary for governments to be able to seize property for their uses, such as creating infrastructure, which ultimately are to be determined by the legislature and not the judiciary.

== Citation style ==
Under the Judiciary Act of 1789 the federal court structure at the time comprised District Courts, which had general trial jurisdiction; Circuit Courts, which had mixed trial and appellate (from the US District Courts) jurisdiction; and the United States Supreme Court, which had appellate jurisdiction over the federal District and Circuit courts—and for certain issues over state courts. The Supreme Court also had limited original jurisdiction (i.e., in which cases could be filed directly with the Supreme Court without first having been heard by a lower federal or state court). There were one or more federal District Courts and/or Circuit Courts in each state, territory, or other geographical region.

Bluebook citation style is used for case names, citations, and jurisdictions.

- "C.C.D." = United States Circuit Court for the District of . . .
  - e.g.,"C.C.D.N.J." = United States Circuit Court for the District of New Jersey
- "D." = United States District Court for the District of . . .
  - e.g.,"D. Mass." = United States District Court for the District of Massachusetts
- "E." = Eastern; "M." = Middle; "N." = Northern; "S." = Southern; "W." = Western
  - e.g.,"C.C.S.D.N.Y." = United States Circuit Court for the Southern District of New York
  - e.g.,"M.D. Ala." = United States District Court for the Middle District of Alabama
- "Ct. Cl." = United States Court of Claims
- The abbreviation of a state's name alone indicates the highest appellate court in that state's judiciary at the time.
  - e.g.,"Pa." = Supreme Court of Pennsylvania
  - e.g.,"Me." = Supreme Judicial Court of Maine

== List of cases in 91 U.S. ==
Case Name	Page & year	Opinion of the Court	Concurring opinion(s)	Dissenting opinion(s)	Lower Court	Disposition
McComb v. Knox Cnty.	1 (1875)	Waite	none	none	Richland Cnty. Ct. Com. Pl.	dismissed
Wilmington & W.R.R. Co. v. King	3 (1875)	Field	none	Bradley	N.C.	reversed
Matthews v. McStea	7 (1875)	Strong	none	none	N.Y.	affirmed
Dainese v. Hale	13 (1875)	Bradley	none	none	Sup. Ct. D.C.	reversed
Semmes v. United States	21 (1875)	Clifford	none	none	C.C.D. La.	affirmed
McLemore v. Louisiana S. Bank	27 (1875)	Davis	none	none	C.C.D. La.	affirmed
Farmers' & M. Nat'l Bank v. Dearing	29 (1875)	Swayne	none	none	N.Y.	reversed
Brown v. Piper	37 (1875)	Swayne	none	none	C.C.D. Mass.	reversed
Piper v. Moon	44 (1875)	Swayne	none	none	C.C.D. Mass.	affirmed
Upton v. Tribilcock	45 (1875)	Hunt	none	Miller	C.C.D. Iowa	reversed
Sanger v. Upton	56 (1875)	Swayne	none	none	C.C.N.D. Ill.	affirmed
Carver v. Upton	64 (1875)	per curiam	none	none	C.C.N.D. Ill.	affirmed
Webster v. Upton	65 (1876)	Strong	none	none	C.C.N.D. Ill.	affirmed
United States v. Union P.R.R. Co.	72 (1875)	Davis	none	none	Ct. Cl.	affirmed
National Bank v. Merchants' Nat'l Bank	92 (1875)	Strong	none	none	C.C.D. Mass.	reversed
Long v. Converse	105 (1875)	Waite	none	none	Mass.	dismissed
Sawyer v. Turpin	114 (1875)	Strong	none	none	C.C.D. Mass.	affirmed
Jackson v. Jackson	122 (1875)	Field	none	Davis	Sup. Ct. D.C.	reversed
Baltimore & P.R.R. Co. v. 6th Pres. Church	127 (1875)	Clifford	none	none	Sup. Ct. D.C.	affirmed
Beauregard v. Case	134 (1875)	Field	none	none	C.C.D. La.	affirmed
Atherton v. Fowler	143 (1875)	Waite	none	none	Cal.	dismissal denied
Roemer v. Simon	149 (1875)	Waite	none	none	C.C.D.N.J.	rehearing denied
Roberts v. Ryer	150 (1875)	Waite	none	none	C.C.S.D.N.Y.	affirmed
Hall v. Lanning	160 (1875)	Bradley	none	none	C.C.N.D. Ill.	reversed
Sewall v. Jones	171 (1875)	Hunt	none	Clifford	C.C.D. Me.	reversed
The Free State	200 (1875)	Hunt	none	none	C.C.E.D. Mich.	affirmed
Mitchell v. Leavenworth Cnty.	206 (1876)	Waite	none	none	Kan.	affirmed
The Sunnyside	208 (1876)	Clifford	none	none	C.C.E.D. Mich.	reversed
Pollard v. Lyon	225 (1876)	Clifford	none	none	Sup. Ct. D.C.	affirmed
Mutual B.L. Ins. Co. v. Tisdale	238 (1876)	Hunt	none	none	C.C.D. Iowa	reversed
Butterfield v. Usher	246 (1876)	Waite	none	none	Sup. Ct. D.C.	dismissed
Muller v. Ehlers	249 (1876)	Waite	none	none	C.C.E.D. Wis.	affirmed
Wright v. Tebbitts	252 (1876)	Waite	none	none	Sup. Ct. D.C.	affirmed
Haines v. Carpenter	254 (1876)	Bradley	none	none	C.C.D. La.	affirmed
McMurray v. Brown	257 (1876)	Clifford	none	none	Sup. Ct. D.C.	affirmed
Black v. United States	267 (1876)	Waite	none	none	Ct. Cl.	affirmed
Moore v. United States	270 (1876)	Bradley	none	none	Ct. Cl.	affirmed
Welton v. Missouri	275 (1876)	Field	none	none	Mo.	reversed
Western Union Tel. Co. v. Western & A.R.R. Co.	283 (1876)	Miller	none	none	C.C.N.D. Ga.	reversed
Forsythe v. Kimball	291 (1876)	Swayne	none	none	C.C.N.D. Ill.	affirmed
Dow v. Humbert	294 (1876)	Miller	none	Clifford	C.C.W.D. Wis.	affirmed
United States v. Allison	303 (1876)	Waite	none	none	Ct. Cl.	reversed
Hoover v. Wise	308 (1876)	Hunt	none	Miller	N.Y. Sup. Ct.	affirmed
United States v. Ashfleld	317 (1876)	Waite	none	none	Ct. Cl.	reversed
United States v. Corliss S.E. Co.	321 (1876)	Field	none	none	Ct. Cl.	affirmed
Lobenstein v. United States	324 (1876)	Waite	none	none	Ct. Cl.	affirmed
Shepley v. Cowan	330 (1876)	Field	none	none	Mo.	affirmed
Stone v. Towne	341 (1876)	Miller	none	none	C.C.S.D. Miss.	reversed
Union P.R.R. Co. v. Hall	343 (1876)	Strong	none	Bradley	C.C.D. Iowa	affirmed
Amory v. Amory	356 (1876)	Waite	none	none	N.Y. Sup. Ct.	dismissal denied
Morsell v. First Nat'l Bank	357 (1876)	Swayne	none	none	Sup. Ct. D.C.	reversed
Arthur v. Cumming	362 (1876)	Swayne	none	none	C.C.S.D.N.Y.	affirmed
The D.R. Martin	365 (1876)	Waite	none	none	C.C.E.D.N.Y.	dismissed
The Juniata	366 (1875)	Waite	none	none	C.C.D. La.	depositions denied
Kohl v. United States	367 (1876)	Strong	none	Field	C.C.S.D. Ohio	affirmed
Romie v. Casanova	379 (1876)	Waite	none	none	Cal.	dismissed
The Dove	381 (1876)	Clifford	none	none	C.C.E.D. Mich.	affirmed
Cooke v. United States	389 (1875)	Waite	none	Clifford	C.C.S.D.N.Y.	reversed
Scudder v. Union Nat'l Bank	406 (1875)	Hunt	none	none	C.C.N.D. Ill.	affirmed
First Unitarian Soc'y v. Faulkner	415 (1875)	Clifford	none	none	C.C.N.D. Ill.	affirmed
Ex parte French	423 (1875)	Waite	none	none	original	mandamus denied
Nudd v. Burrows	426 (1875)	Swayne	none	none	C.C.N.D. Ill.	affirmed
United States v. McKee	442 (1876)	Miller	none	Clifford	Ct. Cl.	affirmed
Townsend v. Todd	452 (1876)	Hunt	none	none	C.C.D. Conn.	affirmed
Grand Trunk R.R. Co. v. Richardson	454 (1876)	Strong	none	none	C.C.D. Vt.	affirmed
Osborn v. United States	474 (1876)	Field	none	none	C.C.D. Kan.	affirmed
Lloyd v. Fulton	479 (1876)	Swayne	none	none	C.C.N.D. Ga.	affirmed
Zeller v. Switzer	487 (1876)	Waite	none	none	La.	dismissed
Milwaukee et al. Ry. Co. v. Arms	489 (1876)	Davis	none	none	C.C.D. Iowa	reversed
Mayer v. Hellman	496 (1876)	Field	none	none	C.C.S.D.N.Y.	reversed
Earle v. McVeigh	503 (1876)	Clifford	none	none	C.C.E.D. Va.	affirmed
Aetna L. Ins. Co. v. France	510 (1876)	Hunt	none	none	C.C.E.D. Pa.	reversed
Lathrop v. Drake	516 (1876)	Bradley	none	none	C.C.E.D. Pa.	reversed
Eyster v. Gaff	521 (1876)	Miller	none	none	Colo.	affirmed
Gould v. Evansville & C.R.R. Co.	526 (1876)	Clifford	none	none	C.C.D. Ind.	affirmed
Lower v. United States	536 (1876)	Davis	none	none	C.C.N.D. Ill.	judgment modified
Barnes v. District of Columbia	540 (1876)	Hunt	none	Field	Sup. Ct. D.C.	reversed
United States v. Norton I	558 (1876)	Waite	none	none	C.C.S.D.N.Y.	certification
Hall v. United States	559 (1876)	Clifford	none	none	C.C.D. Minn.	affirmed
United States v. Norton II	566 (1876)	Swayne	none	none	C.C.S.D.N.Y.	certification
Meyer v. Arthur	570 (1876)	Bradley	none	none	C.C.S.D.N.Y.	affirmed
Spencer v. United States	577 (1876)	Waite	none	none	Ct. Cl.	affirmed
McManus v. O'Sullivan	578 (1876)	Waite	none	none	Cal.	dismissed
Dainese v. Cooke	580 (1875)	Miller	none	none	Sup. Ct. D.C.	reversed
Haldeman v. United States	584 (1876)	Davis	none	none	C.C.D. Ky.	affirmed
Twin-Lick O. Co. v. Marbury	587 (1876)	Miller	none	none	Sup. Ct. D.C.	affirmed
Bolling v. Lersner	594 (1876)	Waite	none	none	Va.	dismissed
Woodruff v. Hough	596 (1876)	Miller	none	none	C.C.N.D. Ill.	affirmed
Gilman v. Illinois & M. Tel. Co.	603 (1876)	Swayne	none	none	C.C.D. Iowa	affirmed
Dows v. National E. Bank	618 (1875)	Strong	none	none	C.C.S.D.N.Y.	affirmed
Knotts v. Stearns	638 (1875)	Field	none	none	C.C.E.D. Va.	affirmed
Mississippi & M.R.R. Co. v. Cromwell	643 (1876)	Bradley	none	none	C.C.D. Iowa	reversed
Phillips & C.C. Co. v. Seymour	646 (1876)	Miller	none	none	C.C.N.D. Ill.	reversed
New Lamp C. Co. v. Ansonia B. & C. Co.	656 (1876)	Clifford	none	none	N.Y. Sup. Ct.	affirmed
Florida v. Anderson	667 (1876)	Bradley	none	none	original	decree for Florida
Warfield v. Chaffe	690 (1876)	Waite	none	none	La.	dismissed
The Colorado	692 (1876)	Clifford	none	none	C.C.E.D. Mich.	affirmed
Warren v. Shook	704 (1876)	Hunt	none	none	C.C.S.D.N.Y.	affirmed
Raymond v. Thomas	712 (1876)	Swayne	none	none	S.C.	affirmed
Nichols v. Eaton	716 (1875)	Miller	none	none	C.C.D.R.I.	affirmed
