= Multipath On-demand Routing =

The Multipath On-demand Routing (MOR) protocol is a protocol to connect nodes in wireless sensor networks. It is an ad hoc routing protocol which is reactive or on-demand, meaning that it establishes routes as needed. The advantage of this approach is obvious if only a few routes are needed, since the routing overhead is less compared to the proactive approach of establishing routes whether or not they are needed. The disadvantage of on-demand establishment of routes is that connections take more time if the route needs to be established.

MOR lessens the disadvantages of on-demand routing in wireless sensor networks by having the likely targets of communication perform an initial broadcast. This allows all recipients to have a route to these nodes.

The main characteristic distinguishing MOR from other ad hoc routing protocols is that it maintains multiple routes to each destination, when available, whereas most other such protocols only keep a single route. There are many advantages to having multiple routes when possible, including

- increased reliability
- potentially better load balancing
- more even energy consumption (a consequence of better load balancing)

Each node in MOR remembers all next-hop nodes that are closer to a given destination for which a route exists. It then sends successive packets to each such node in round-robin fashion. If a next-hop node fails to acknowledge a given packet, the retransmission is attempted to another node, again if possible. This allows automatic and graceful recovery from occasional localized congestion as well as longer-term reasons for node unavailability.
