= Jacqueline J. Mohr =

American marketing scholar

- Education: University of Wisconsin-Madison (PhD)
- Scientific career
- Workplaces: University of Montana

Jacqueline J. Mohr is an American marketing scholar and Regents Professor of Marketing and the Poe Family Distinguished Faculty Fellow at the University of Montana.
