= Moar Mound and Village Site =

Archaeological site in Ohio, United States

- Moar Mound And Village
- U.S. National Register of Historic Places
- U.S. Historic district
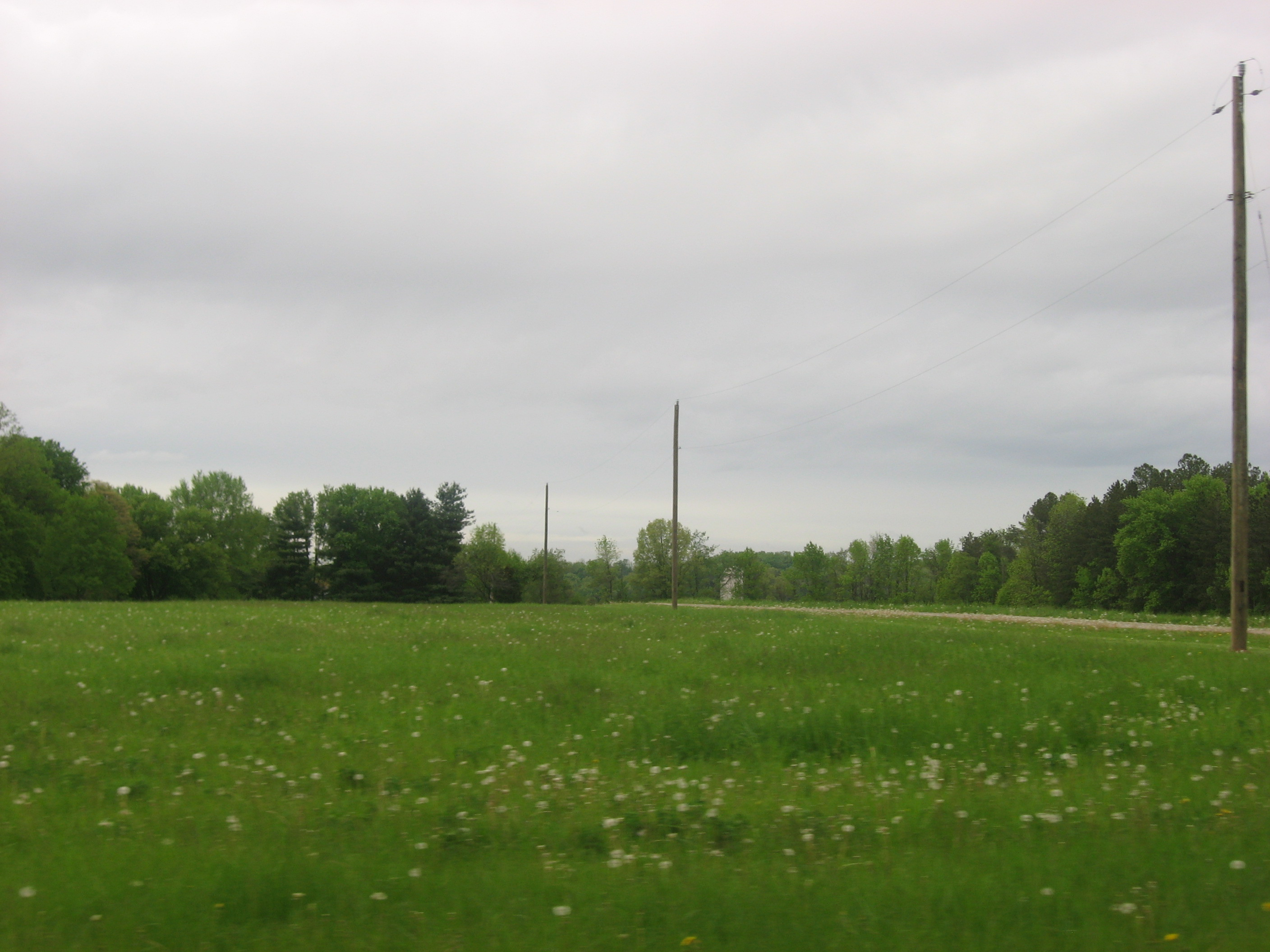
- Overview of the site

- Location within Ohio Location within the United States
- Location: Back a lane on the northern side of Lebanon-Union Rd., west of Morrow
- Nearest city: Morrow, Ohio
- Coordinates: 39°21′49″N 84°11′45″W
- Area: 20 acres (8.1 ha)
- NRHP reference No.: 76001543
- Added to NRHP: January 1, 1976

The Moar Mound and Village Site is an archaeological site in the southwestern part of the U.S. state of Ohio. Located west of Morrow in Warren County, it comprises two contributing properties — the village site and the Native American mound — spread out over an area of 20 acres (8.1 ha). One of the few remaining mounds in southern Warren County, the Moar Mound has been very well preserved from deterioration.

Believed to be the work of Late Woodland peoples, the mound is believed to be the burial location for one or more individuals and a range of grave goods. It is likely associated directly with the adjacent village, from which multiple burials have been recovered. Archaeological excavations of the village site have yielded a wide range of artifacts, making the Moar Mound and Village Site one of Warren County's premier archaeological sites.

In 1976, the Moar Mound and Village Site were listed together on the National Register of Historic Places. Key to this designation as a historic site was their potential to yield archaeological information about the peoples that built the mound and lived in the village.
