= Moore Hall =

Moore Hall may refer to:

== England ==
- Moore Hall, Cheshire

== Ireland ==
- Moore Hall, County Mayo, the ancestral home of the Moore family in Carra, County Mayo, Ireland

== United States ==
- Moore Hall (Kansas State University), a dormitory, in Manhattan, Kansas
- Moore Hall (Phoenixville, Pennsylvania), listed on the National Register of Historic Places in eastern Chester County, Pennsylvania

== See also ==
- The Moor Hall, a 1905 house in Sutton Coldfield, Birmingham, England
