= More & More =

German multinational clothing and apparel corporation

More & More GmbH
- Type: GmbH
- Industry: Textile,
- Founder: Karl-Heinz Mohr
- Headquarters: Munich, Bavaria, Germany
- Area served: Worldwide (except * Germany, Austria, Belgium, Luxembourg, Finland, France, Ireland, Middle East, Netherlands, Russia, Switzerland)
- Key people: Yasar Esgin (General manager)
- Products: clothing
- Website: more-and-more.com

The More & More GmbH, founded in Munich in 1982, is a German ready-to-wear brand with nearly 1,000 points of sale and nearly 200 stores.

== History ==
Founded in 1982 in Munich by Karl-Heinz Mohr, More & More opened the first MORE & MORE store in the heart of Munich in 1984. In 1990, the MORE & MORE WOMAN collection was launched. The brand, which sells to 16 countries, sells at 950 points. In 2002, Cenk Tekstil and Hedef Dış Ticaret, the largest shareholder of the German More & More store chain, acquired 25 percent of the shares and, in 2016, acquired 100 percent of the brand. Yaşar Eşgin, the owner of More & More, which has nearly 1,000 sales points and nearly 200 stores in the world and is a world brand, said:

"The most essential thing for survival today is finding a market. With this merger, we have taken an important step towards establishing a presence in the global market. Through this merger, we have become partners in the added value of More & More. We will have 50% of More & More's products manufactured by Hedef's members." "We will also increase Turkey's production share by increasing the number of More & More stores in Europe."

== Stores ==
More & More has nearly 1,000 sales points and nearly 200 stores worldwide.

=== Countries with stores ===
- Germany
- Austria
- Belgium
- Luxembourg
- Finland
- France
- Ireland
- Middle East
- Netherlands
- Russia
- Switzerland
