= Guido Demoor =

Guido Demoor (1951) was a Belgian NMBS/SNCB Thalys train driver and father of two children. He died on 24 June 2006 after an incident of violence in an Antwerp public transport bus with a group of six youths. The exact circumstances under which Demoor died remain disputed. One of the youths was sentenced to a conditional two years imprisonment for kicking Demoor.

== Incident ==
The incident took place around 15:00 (3 p.m.) on 24 June 2006, when the 54-year-old Demoor was heading to work on a De Lijn city bus in Antwerp. There was a disturbance, involving Demoor and six youths of Moroccan descent (five Belgian citizens, one with Spanish passport). During the incident, Demoor received more than one blow to his body. Near the end of the incident, one of the youths rang the alarm bell, and some or all of them left the bus. Demoor died, after or before the boys left the bus, apparently from a subarachnoid hemorrhage.

Initial press reports led to believe that the youths started causing a disturbance on the bus. When Demoor stood up and tried to calm things down, he was beaten to the ground and kicked repeatedly. The youths then pulled the emergency brake and fled the bus, leaving Demoor to die.

Later, newspapers however reported that he asked the youths to calm down, and that, when they wouldn't listen, he grabbed one of them at the throat. Two of them then beat and kicked Demoor, the other four watched. After this, the youngsters fled.

According to the youth's lawyers, the six youths were just making noise. Demoor repeatedly yelled to lower the volume. One of the youths apologised. After another yell from Demoor, one of the youths started making animal noises, upon which Demoor made physical threats, calling: "It's always the same problem with you, Moroccans".

When the supposedly threatened youth tried to ward off Demoor, the latter is said to have grabbed the boy (1m 60 tall) at the throat and pushed his head against the bus window, yelling : "Now you will shut up!" The attacked boy asking for help, his friend struck Demoor twice, upon which Demoor released his victim. A third boy pushed the alarm button, the attacked boy kicked Demoor in the chest, and five of the six boys fled from the bus. The sixth boy remained on the bus, and only got off a few minutes later, at a regular bus stop. At that moment, Demoor was still alive and looking well. Demoor died a few moments later. All youths, three of them minors, were arrested days after the incident.

== Investigation ==
Initially, witnesses were able to provide a description of only one youngster. However, two days after the incident, when more testimonies came in, the police were able to identify three of them. On June 26 three arrests were made. In the morning of June 27, the three remaining boys were arrested. Three of the arrested youths had previously been in contact with the police in connection to minor crimes. Public broadcasters claimed that the arrests were thanks to tips received from the ethnic North African community, but the justice department denied this. VTM quoted a friend of one of the youngsters saying that "they didn't intend to kill Demoor and only fled because they panicked."

Later on in the investigation, the public prosecutor reclassed the case from manslaughter to assault and battery resulting in unintentional death.

An autopsy on Demoor's body showed that he died because of a subarachnoid hemorrhage, possibly caused by high blood pressure or anxiety, or — indirectly — by the wounds brought on during the fight. The doctors declared that there is a "medical causal relationship" between the beats received and the cause of death. On July 1, a reconstruction of the incident was held in a De Lijn depot, because of safety concerns and the fact that the setting was of little importance.

On July 3 two adults were released. The lawyer of one of the other Moroccan youths claimed that he would seek acquittal on grounds of self-defence. On July 7 and July 11, two of the minors were released, bringing the total number of people in custody to two out of six. The courts are thereby apparently following the above-mentioned version of the facts put forward by the youths' lawyers.

At the end of September 2006, one minor and one adult was still in custody. An experts' report showed that "a connection between the facts and the death can't be ruled out".

== Final court ruling ==
On November 14, 2007, the court of appeal ruled that Demoor had not provoked the facts, and that the beating was indeed the direct cause of his death. However, the sole adult suspect's sentence of two years imprisonment (which he had received in the original trial, but appealed against) was converted into a conditional sentence, meaning that he will not be sent to jail unless he commits new facts. The court cited his youthfulness, his blank criminal record, and his remorse (which the widow of Demoor claims not to have seen) as reasons for this lighter sentence.

== Reactions ==
There were official condemnations by mayor Patrick Janssens and prime minister Guy Verhofstadt. The latter called for a revision of the Belgian parole system. Unions for both De Lijn and the NMBS/SNCB employees called for more safety in their vehicles.

The Vlaams Belang, then the largest opposition party, criticized the fact that the incident was commonly referred to in the media as the bus incident and not murder. They said the "downplaying" of this incident of "violence by immigrant youths", was done because "the media are controlled and dictated by socialists and liberals". During Demoor's funeral on June 30, a 14-year-old girl who witnessed the incident read a letter saying that "he was just a nice man trying to bring calm". His colleagues declared that Demoor was a calm and peace-loving man, and said to be outraged that he was being presented as the initial aggressor by some.
