= Sigismund Mohr =

Canadian electric engineer (1827–1893)

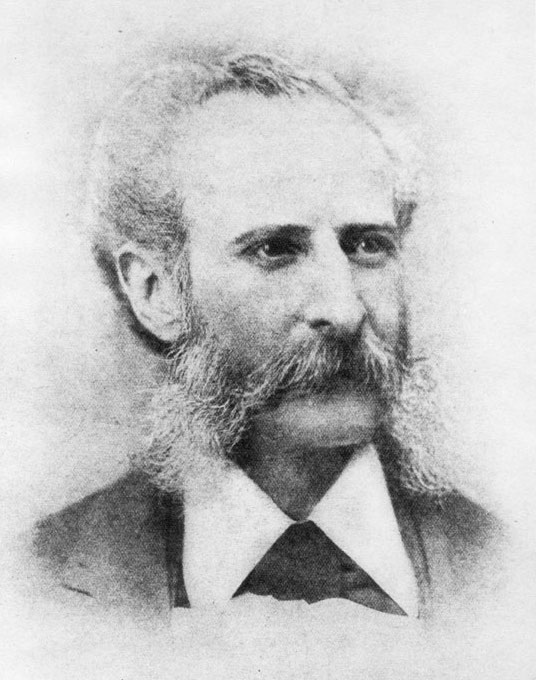
- Born: October 21, 1827; Breslau, Kingdom of Prussia
- Died: December 15, 1893 (aged 66); Quebec City, Quebec, Canada
- Resting place: Cypress Hills Cemetery, New York
- Education: College of Breslau
- Spouse: Blume Levi (m. 1856)

Sigismund Mohr (October 21, 1827 – December 15, 1893) was a Canadian engineer. He is best known for pioneering the use of hydro-electric power in Canada, and the installation of electric light and telephone systems in Quebec.

== Early life and education ==
Sigismund Mohr was born to a Jewish family in Breslau, Kingdom of Prussia, in 1827. He received a degree in electrical engineering from the College of Breslau in 1849. After living in London for a time, Mohr settled in Quebec City around 1871.

== Career ==
In 1876, Mohr obtained exclusive rights to establish a telegraph company in Quebec City, which he did under the name City District Telegraph Company. He also introduced telephones to the city, and his company eventually won the province-wide rights to Alexander Graham Bell's invention. Mohr became an agent for the newly created Bell Telephone Company of Canada and worked to integrate the city's telephone and telegraph systems. He also laid a telephone cable between Quebec City and Levis in 1882.

In the 1880s, Mohr turned his attention to the development of electrical power in the region. He became the manager of the Quebec & Levis Electric Lighting Company and worked to harness the power of the Montmorency Falls to generate electricity. In 1885, he successfully lit the first electric street lamps in Quebec City, on the Terrasse Dufferin, to a crowd of 20,000 people, which sparked widespread demand for electrification in the city.

== Death ==
Mohr continued to develop the electric lighting network in Quebec City until his death from influenza in 1893.
