= Johannes Morus =

Johannes Morus (Italian: Giovanni Moro; - 1254, buried in November) was a servant of Frederick II of Swabia, Holy Roman Emperor. Johannes was the son of a Saracen slave. Initially a slave himself, he was a beneficiary of an "unusual" social mobility that allowed him to gain considerable political power at the Swabian court of the Kingdom of Sicily, up to the position of Grand Chamberlain (Custodian of the Treasury), to which was added a prominent role in Lucera, under Frederick II and under Frederick's son Conrad IV.

To his Saracen and African origin he also owes his name, which refers to his ethnic origin and the color of his complexion. A bust, with African features, found in the castle of Lucera, is believed to be a likeness of Johannes. His loyalty to the Swabian dynasty ended in 1254, under Manfred, when Johannes passed to the opposing pro-papal Guelph side. He was subsequently killed by the Saracens of Lucera. In a letter dated November 9, 1254, Pope Innocent IV affirmed Johannes' conversion to the Catholic faith. Upon his death, his office of Grand Chamberlain was the prerogative of Manfred II, Marquise of Maletta.
