= United States v. Moore =

United States v. Moore may refer to:

- United States v. Moore, 486 F.2d 1139 (D.C. Cir. 1973)
- United States v. Moore, 846 F.2d 1136 (8th Cir. 1988)
- United States v. Moore, 53 U.S. 209 (1852)
- United States v. Moore, 95 U.S. 760 (1878)
- United States v. Moore, 340 U.S. 616 (1951)
- United States v. Moore, 423 U.S. 77 (1975)
- United States v. Moore, 423 U.S. 122 (1975)

== See also ==
- United States v. More
- Moore v. United States
