= Møre =

Møre is the name of two traditional districts in different parts of Scandinavia.

- Møre og Romsdal, Norway
- Möre, Sweden

== See also ==
- Møre (newspaper), a newspaper in Møre og Romsdal county, Norway
