= Moro family =

One of the founding families of Venice

House of Moro Ca' de' Mòro
- Noble house
- Coat of arms of the family
- Country: Republic of Venice; Italy; Albania; Croatia; Cyprus; Greece; Montenegro; Slovenia; Russia; Turkey; Ukraine; Austria-Hungary; Austria; Hungary; Czech Republic; Slovakia; Bosnia and Herzegovina; Serbia; Poland
- Origin: Roman Empire
- Founder: Albino Moro (Venetian language); Albinus Maurus (Latin)
- Estate: Venetian palaces

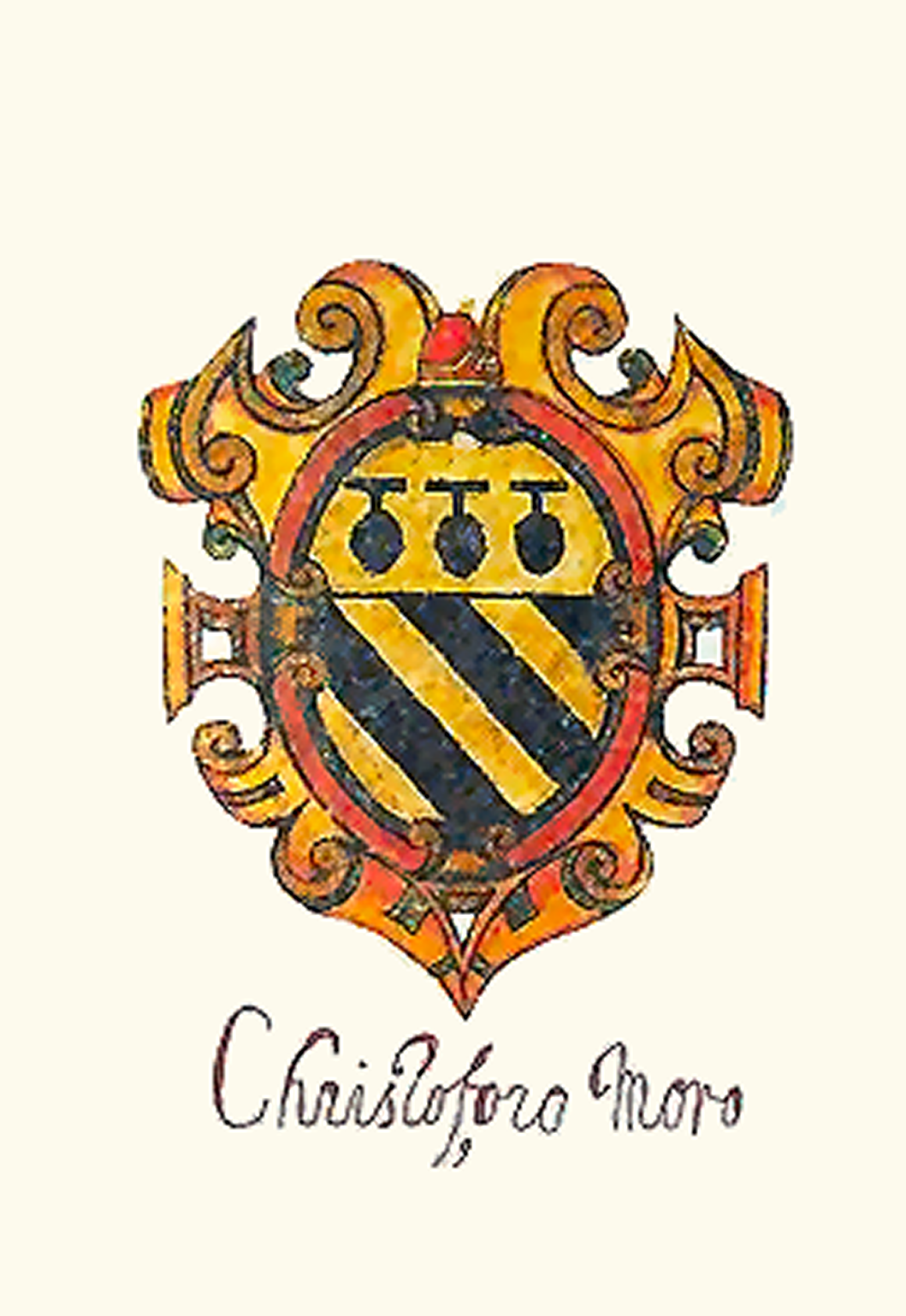
Coat of arms of Cristoforo Moro, 67th Doge of the Republic of Venice

The Moro family was a patrician family of the Republic of Venice.

The family gave birth to ambassadors, politicians, generals and procurators of Saint Mark, bishops, patriarchs and a doge.

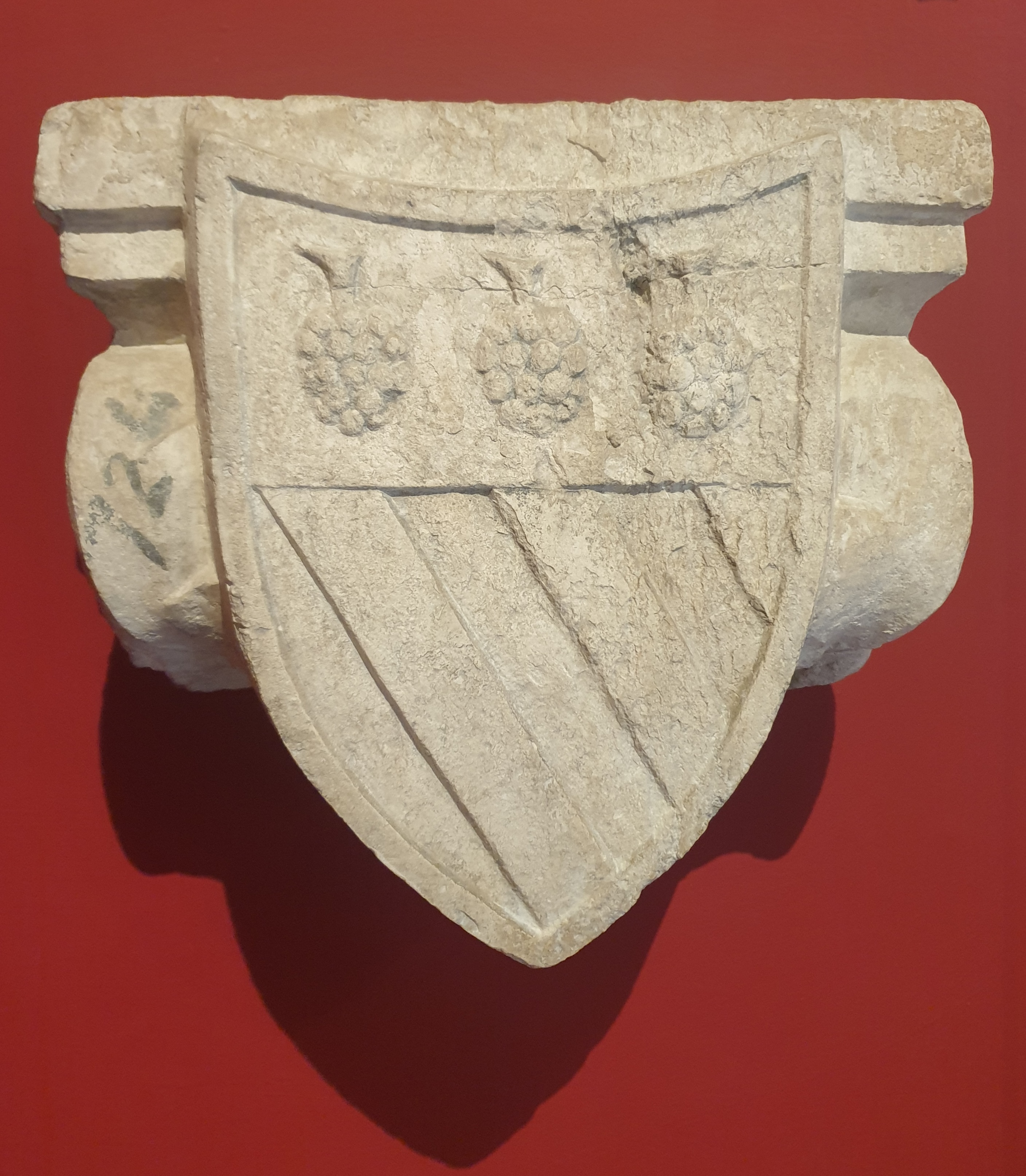
The emblem of House of Moro carved in stone, kept at the Correr Museum in Saint Mark's Square

== History ==
Native of the Roman Mauretania, the family settled in Rome in the 1st century, before spreading to several other European cities within the Empire. One of these branches settled in Patavium, and flourished there. Indeed, the family played an important role in the administration of its government: in 421 or 434, some consuls gathered to the Venetian lagoon to lay the foundations of Venice. Among them, consul Albinus Maurus (Venetian: Albino Mòro) from Patavium co-founded, on the Realtine islands, the first settlements of the new city, from which this Venetian House began. Indeed, during the first years of their settlement in the Venetian lagoon, the administrators of the new city remained subject to the administration of the cities from which they came. Thus, Padua sent annual magistrates to Rialto with the title of consuls; the names of some of these officials have been handed down to us; they are: Albino Moro, Antonio Calvo, Alberto Faliero, Tommaso Candiano, Hugo Foscolo, Cesare Dandolo, who founded the patrician families of the Moros, the Calvis, the Candianis, the Falieris, families which still existed at the time of the fall of the republic in Venice, Bergamo, Brescia and, outside the Venetian Republic, in Genoa and Turin. In the library of the Camaldolese convent of San Michele, near Venice, there is a decree issued by the Senate of Padua in 421, which orders the construction of a town at Rialto and the concentration on this point of the inhabitants who had previously been scattered in various surrounding islands.

The family is attested with certainty from 982, and its membership within the Maggior Consiglio persisted even after the lockout of 1297.

The House of Moro exerted an increasingly preeminent role in the government of Venice and, from 1388, the date of Francesco Moro's return from the island of Negroponte, the family had a long-lasting influence in the public life of Venetian Republic. It reached the peak of the republican institutions with the election of Cristoforo Moro (1462-1471) as the 67th doge, nine years after the Fall of Constantinople by Mehmed II, and amidst the Ottoman-Venetian wars.

Following the fall of the Venetian Republic in 1797, the family is still counted among the nobility of the Austro-Hungarian monarchy.

== Notable members ==
- Cristoforo Moro (1390-1471), 67th doge of Venice, elected in 1462;
- Giovanni Moro, Venetian ambassador to the Holy See, was anointed by Pope Gregory XIV;
- Pietro Moro was created cardinal by Pope Gregory XII;
- Giovanni Moro patriarch of Grado in 1121;
- Simeone Moro († 1292), bishop of Castello since 1291;
- Giacomo Moro, politician during the war against Carrara (1370-1380);
- Giovanni Moro (1406-1456), one of the first rettori of the Domini di Terraferma; Venetian ambassador to the House of Malatesta, the Duchy of Ferrara, Republic of Siena and Alfonso of Aragon's Kingdom of Naples.
- Antonio Moro, rettore of Padua, Feltre, Bassano and Bologna;
- Damiano Moro, provveditore of the Venetian army during the war against Ferrara (1482-1484);
- Giovanni Moro, duke of Candia (modern Crete) (1538);
- Giovanni Moro (1542-1592), senator; Venetian ambassador to France (1581) and Venetian bailo of Constantinople since 1587 after the Battle of Lepanto;
- Gabriele Moro († 1650), philosopher.
- Gerolamo Lino Moro (1903-1990), Italian politician, Senator and member of the Chamber of Deputies.

=== The family today ===
The Venetian surname is attested to belong to a noble Italian family in Venice, Bergamo, Brescia, within the historical territory of the Republic of Venice.

== Venetian palaces ==
- Palazzo Moro a San Barnaba or Moro Barbini in Dorsoduro sestriere;
- Palazzo Moro Lin on the Grand Canal, in San Marco sestriere;
- Palazzo Moro Marcello, in San Marco sestriere;
- Palazzo Moro in San Salvador, in San Marco sestriere;
- Palazzo Moro Lin, in San Polo sestriere.
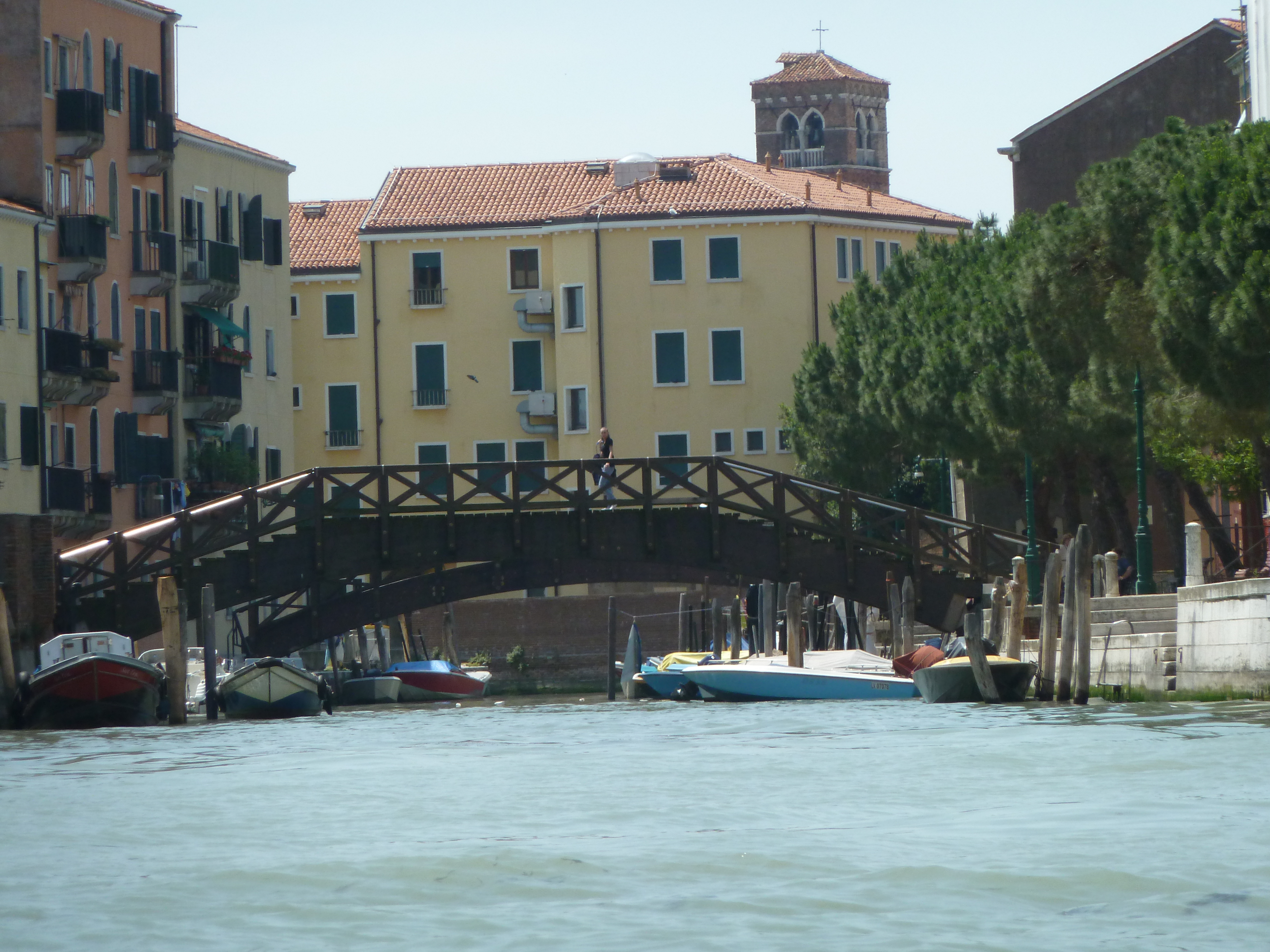
  Moro Bridge on the Rio de Ca' Moro
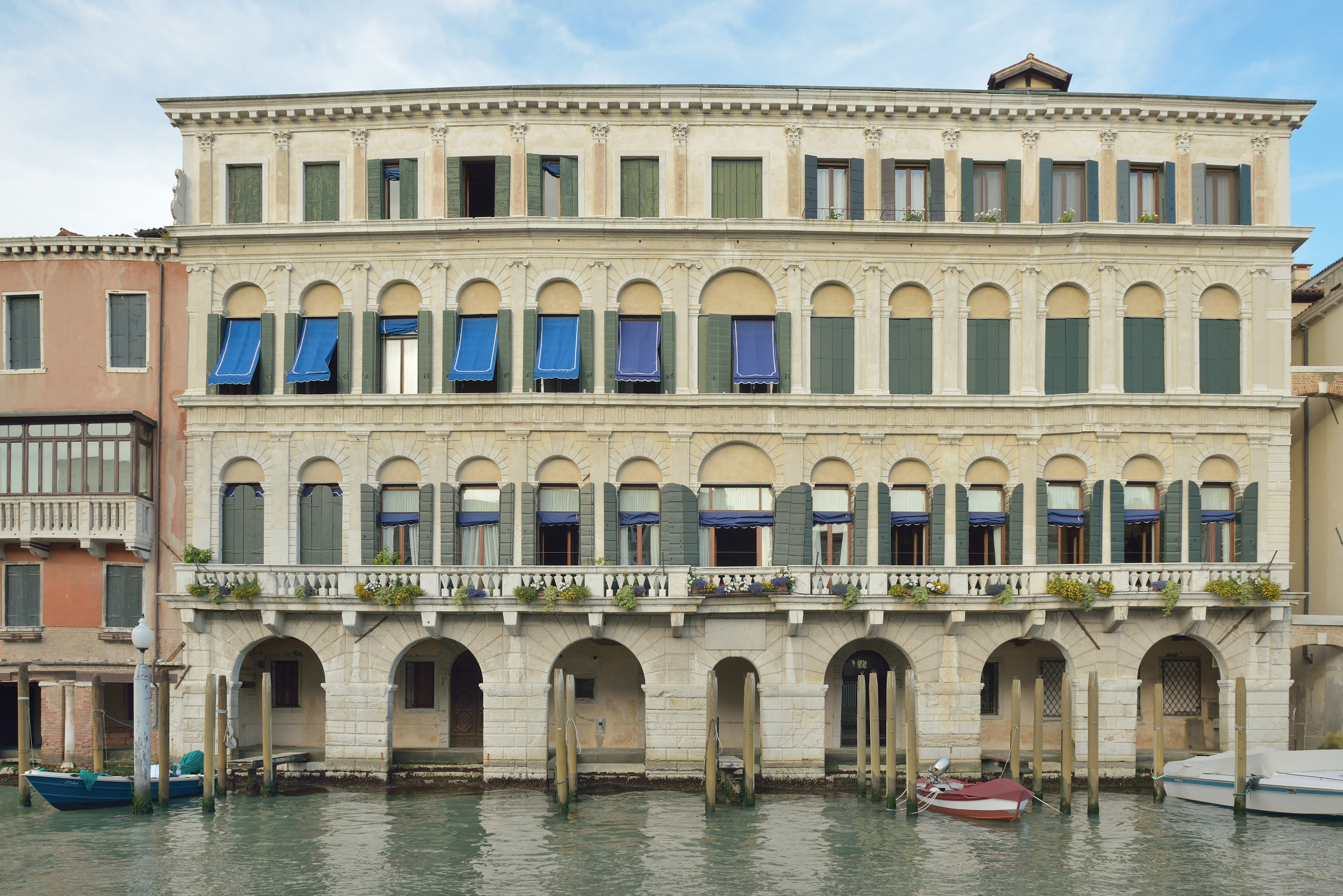
  Moro Lin Palace on the Grand Canal
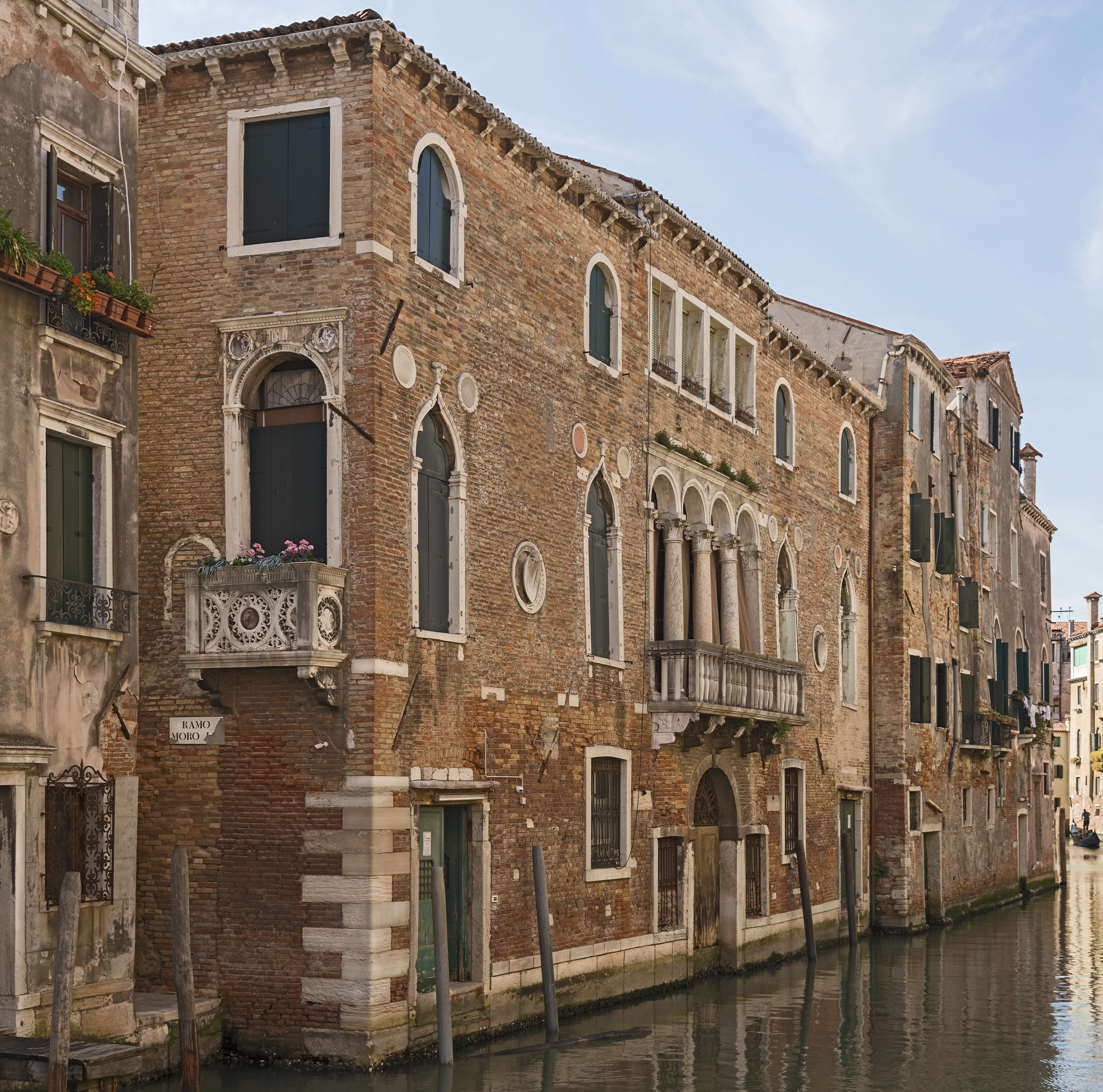
  Moro-Lin Michiel Olivo Palace
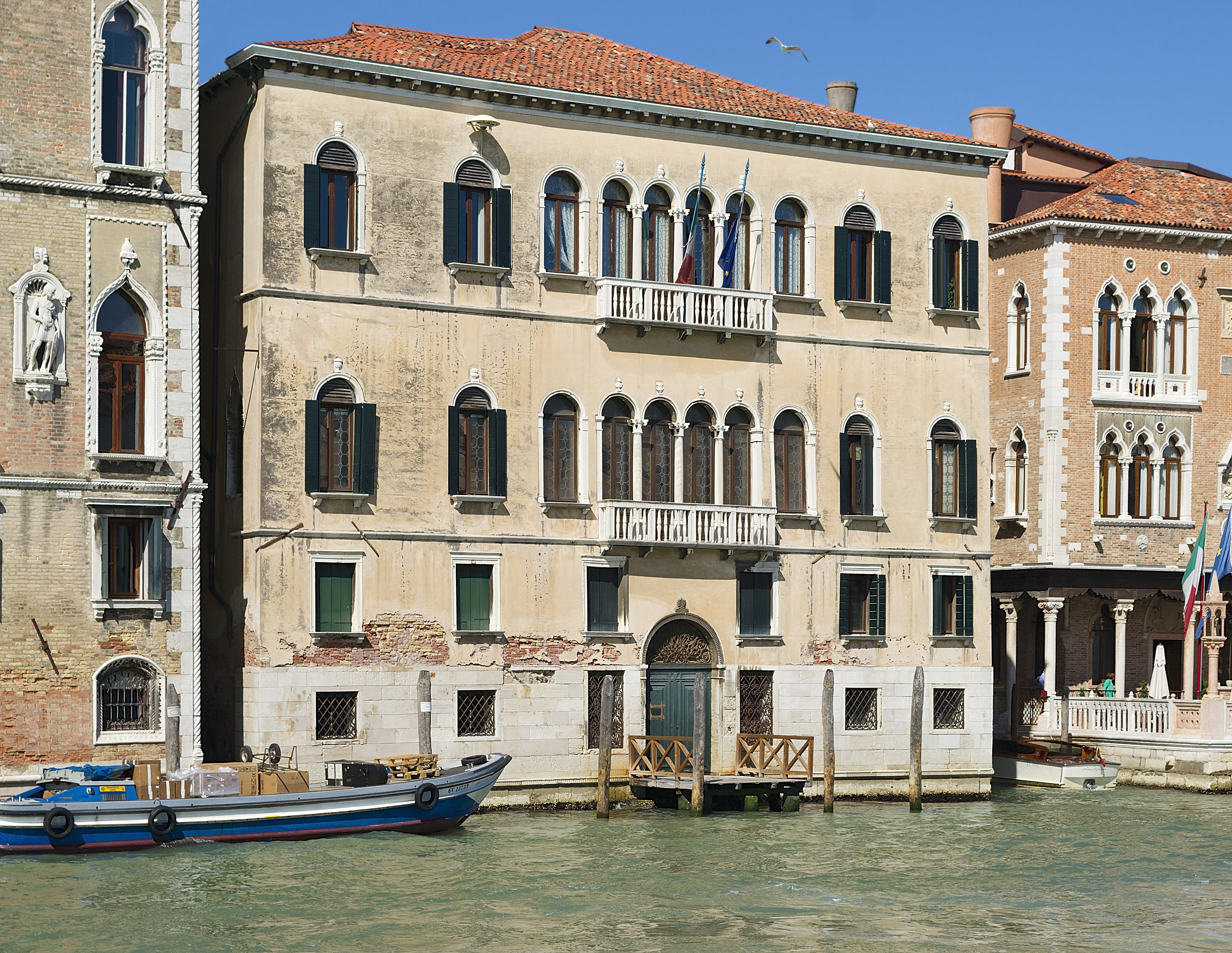
  Moro Palace in Saint Barnaba
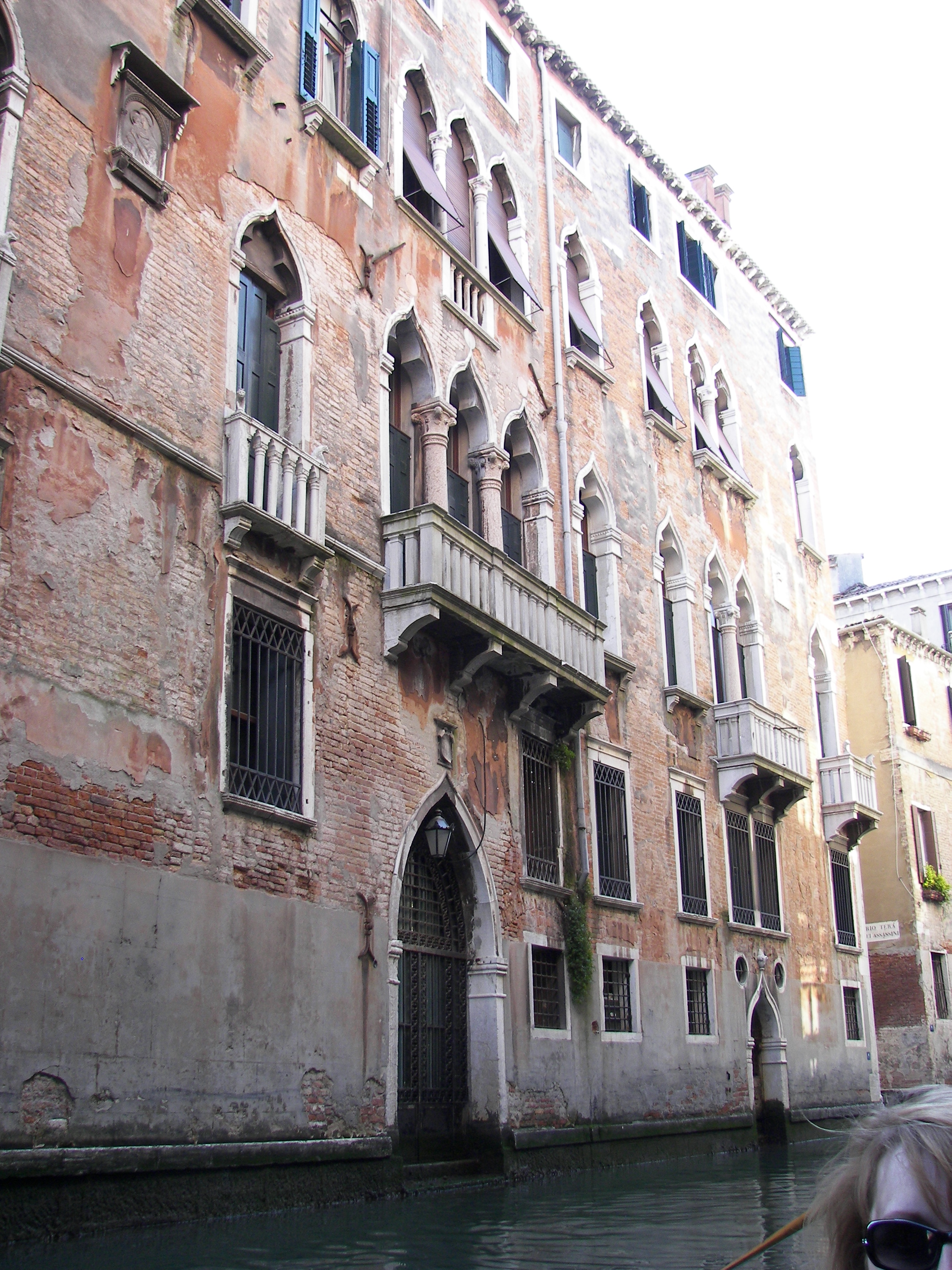
  Moro Marcello Palace
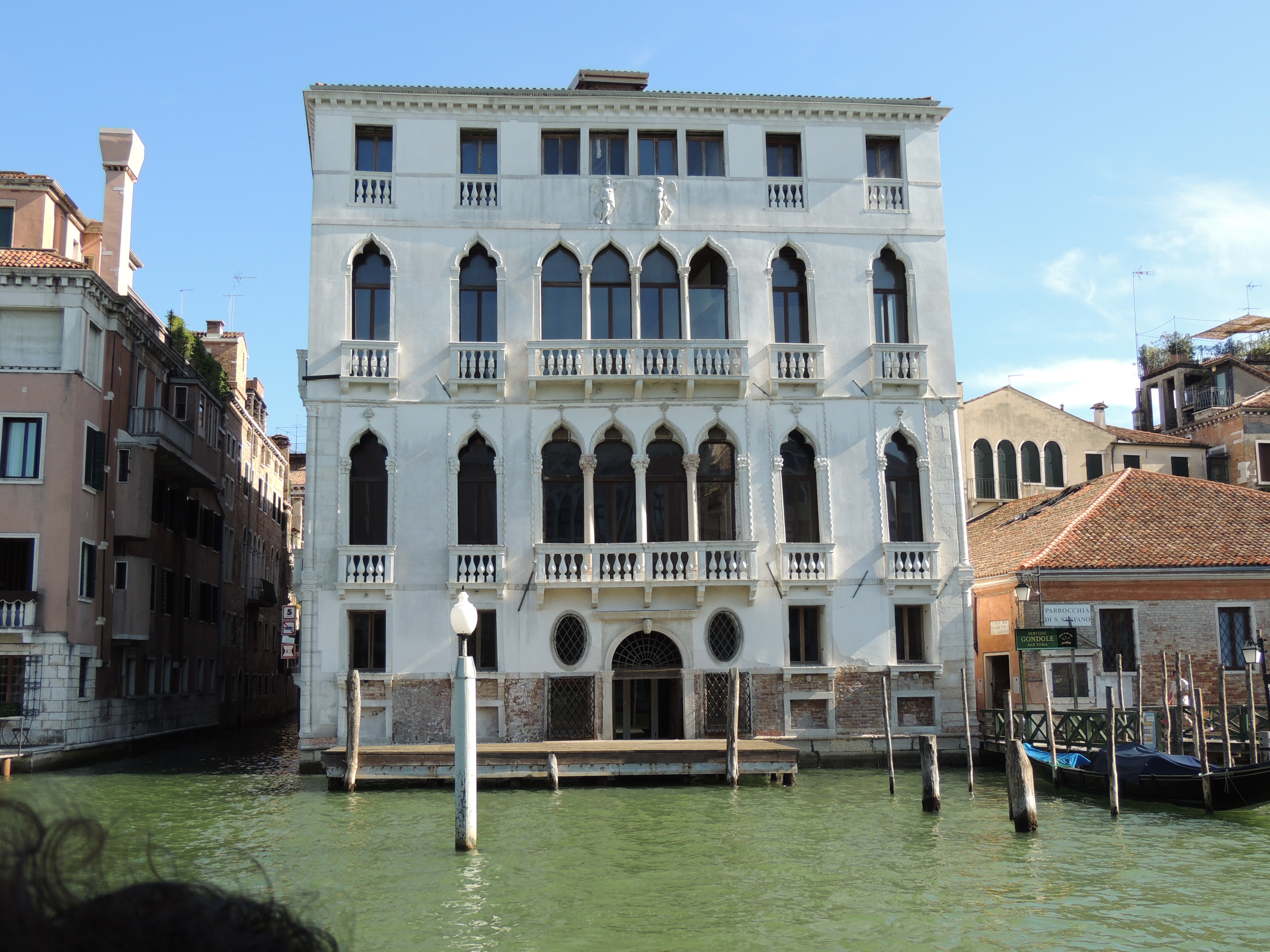
  Palazzo Garzoni Moro on the Grand Canal
