= Cristoforo Moro =

Doge of Venice from 1462 to 1471

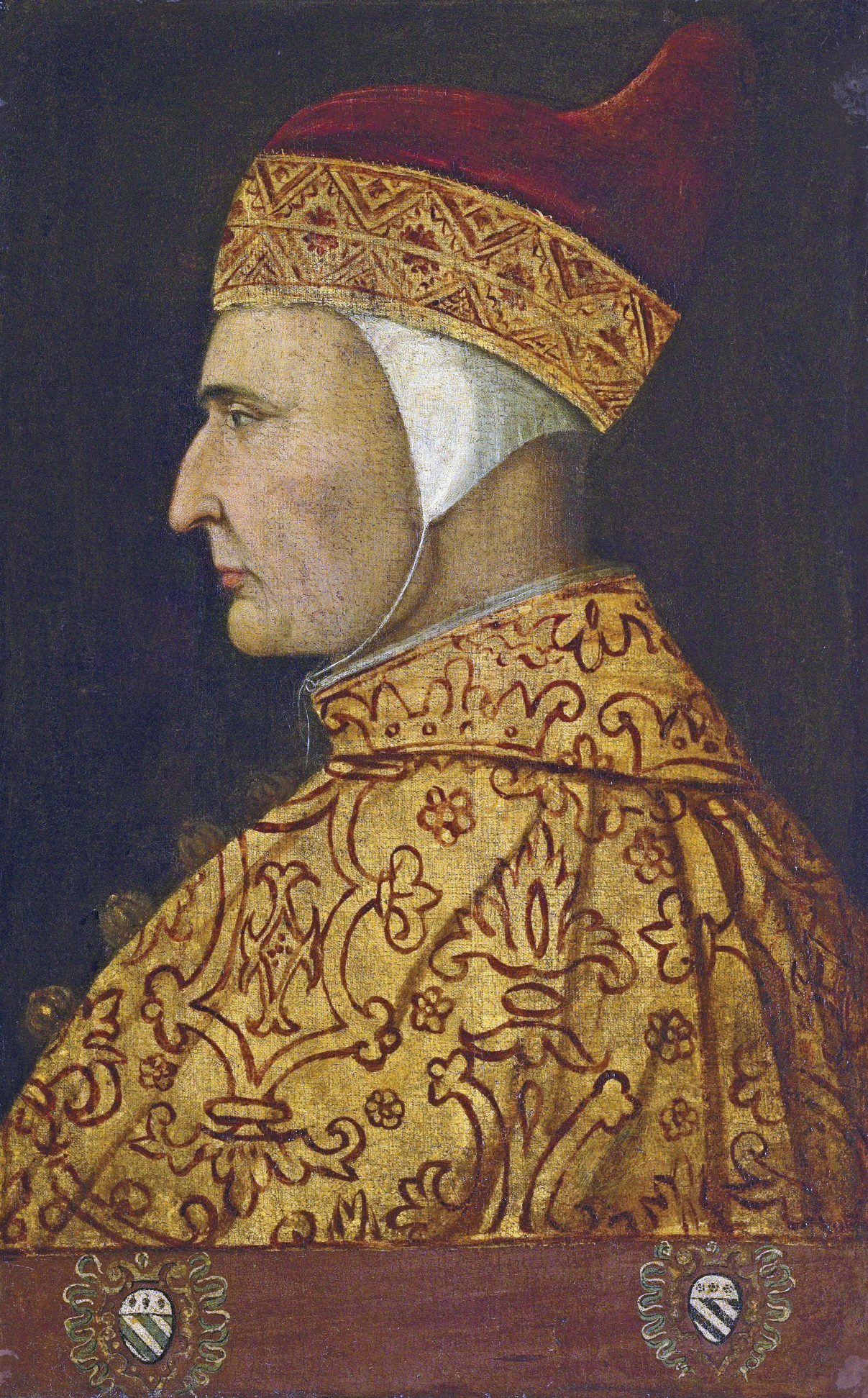
- Doge Cristoforo Moro (1390–1471)

67th Doge of Venice
- In office 1462–1471
- Preceded by: Pasquale Malipiero
- Succeeded by: Nicolò Tron

Personal details
- Born: 1390 Venice, Italy
- Died: 10 November 1471 (aged 80–81) Venice, Italy
- Resting place: Sanctuary of the Church of Saint Giobbe

Military service
- Battles/wars: Ottoman–Venetian War (1463–1479)

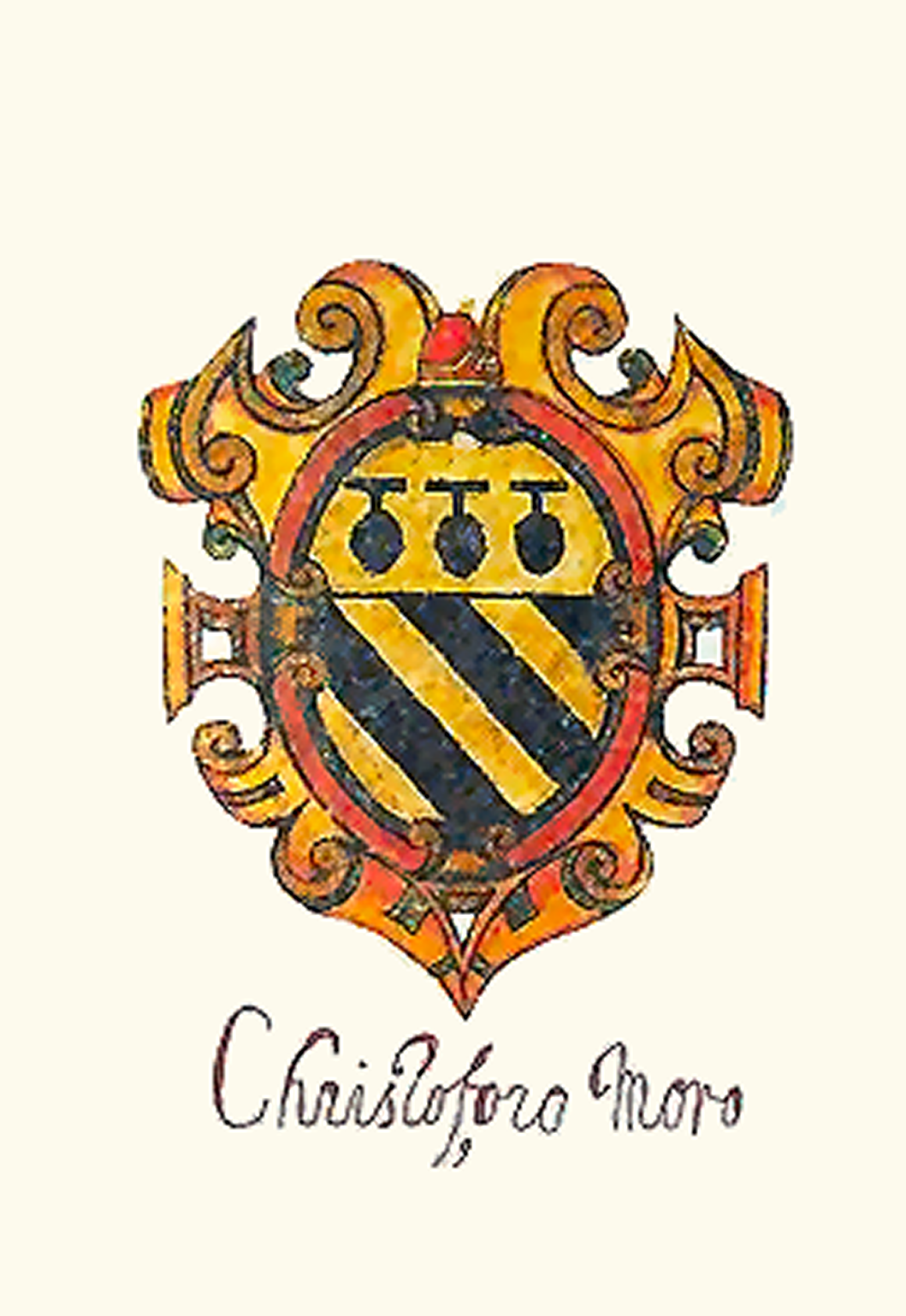
Cristoforo Moro's coat of arms

Cristoforo Moro (1390 – 10 November 1471) was the 67th Doge of Venice. He reigned from 1462 to 1471.

== Family ==
The Moro family settled in Venice in the 5th century when Stephanus Maurus, a great-grandson of Maurus, built a church on the island of Murano. Cristoforo was the eleventh person from the family to be elected doge. His dogaressa was Cristina Sanudo.

== Life ==
After graduating from university, Moro held various public offices. He was the Venetian ambassador to the Popes Eugene IV and Nicholas V. Saint Bernardino of Siena was said to have prophesied that Moro would one day become doge, and as the fulfilment of a solemn vow, Moro had the Church of Saint Giobbe built and dedicated to Bernardino's memory. He bequeathed his fortune to various charitable organisations and foundations, including the Church of Saint Giobbe.

=== Doge ===
Moro's reign was marked by the beginning of a long war between Venice and the Turks. In 1463, Pope Pius II sent Moro a consecrated sword with the intention of convincing Venice to join the anti-Turk alliance. The reaction in Venice was initially hesitant, as the Republic's main priority was its economic interests.

In April 1463, 10 years after the conquest of Constantinople, Turkish troops occupied the Venetian fortress of Argos in Greece. The Latin Patriarch Cardinal Johannes Bessarion travelled to Venice to call on the Republic to join the "defence of the faith"; i.e. join the war against the Turks. That same year, a coalition was formed between Venice, Hungary and the Albanian prince Skanderbeg with the blessing of the Pope to counter the threat of Sultan Mehmed II's aggressive policy of conquest. The coalition succeeded in temporarily halting Turkish expansion; however, the new territorial limits acquired by the Turks in their conquests had, by and large, been accepted.

In 1469, the Venetian fleet commander Niccolò Canal retook the town of Ainos in Thrace, but he was not able to defend the island of Negroponte (Euboea), a major granary of Venice, from Turkish attack. Euboea was conquered by the Sultan while inflicting enormous losses on the Venetian forces.

The Republic faced further threats from the northern Italian cities, who coveted Venetian land, as well as from the French king Louis XI, who was seeking to expand Lombardy at the expense of Venice.

== Tomb ==
Moro's tomb is located in the sanctuary of the Church of Saint Giobbe. The tomb is above ground, covered with a marble tombstone.

== Bibliography ==
- Mosto, Andrea da (1983). I Dogi di Venezia. Firenze.
- Dumler, Helmut (2001). Venedig und die Dogen. Düsseldorf.

Political offices
Preceded by Pasquale Malipiero	Doge of Venice; 1462–1471	Succeeded by Nicolò Tron
