= Moros y Cristianos (disambiguation) =

Moros y Cristianos is a festival celebrated in parts of Spain.

Moros y Cristianos may also refer to:

- Moros y Cristianos of Alcoy, a festival in Alcoy, Alicante, Spain
- Moros y Cristianos (dish), a Cuban recipe for black beans and white rice
- Moros y cristianos (TV programme), a Spanish debate show aired between 1997 and 2001

== Food ==
- Moros y Cristianos (dish), a Cuban dish of rice and beans

== See also ==
- Reconquista, centuries of battle between Christians and Muslims in Spain
- Moresca, a Spanish folk dance representing the battles between the Christians and Moors (Muslims)
- Moreška, a Croatian sword dance, originally representing Christians and Moors, but later changed to Turks and Moors in the 19th century
