= Marion C. Moore School =

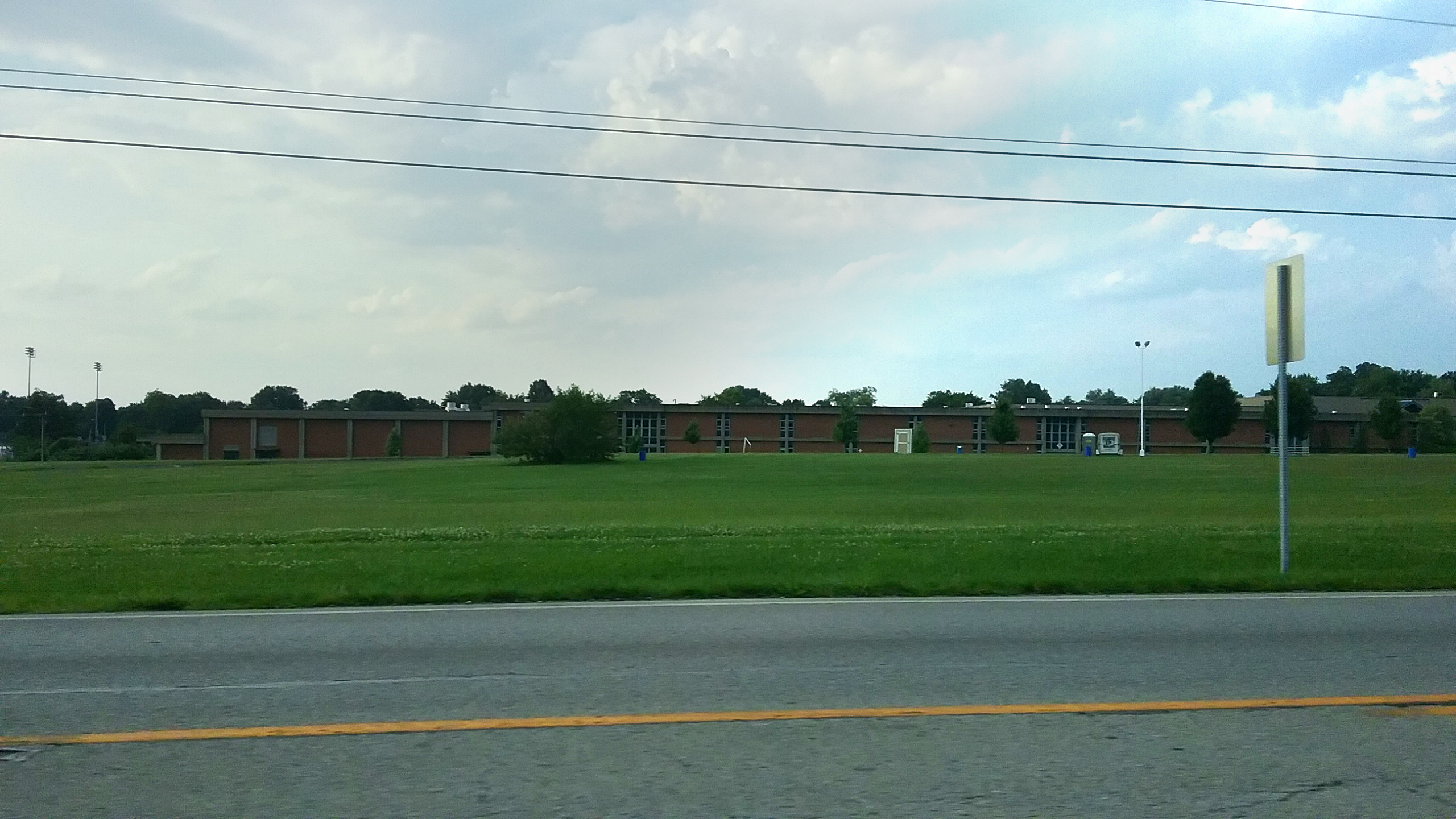

Location
- 6415 Outer Loop, Louisville, KY 40228; Louisville, Kentucky; United States; 38°8′22″N 85°38′15″W

Information
- Type: Public
- Motto: We are not traditional. We are unique. We are Moore.
- Established: 1969
- Locale: Suburban
- Principal: Jason Detre (Interim)
- Teaching staff: 139.80 (FTE)
- Grades: 6–12
- Enrollment: 2,031 (2023–2024)
- Student to teacher ratio: 14.53
- Colors: Navy Blue & Gray black
- Mascot: Mustang (High School), Thoroughbreds (Middle School).
- Newspaper: Canon
- Yearbook: Saga
- Website: www.jefferson.kyschools.us/schools/profiles/moore-traditional

Marion C. Moore is a public middle school and high school located in Louisville, Kentucky, United States.

== History ==
In 2017, the name of the school was changed from Moore Traditional School to Marion C. Moore School.

On November 22, 2019, the Marion C. Moore Instagram page made a post announcing Rob Fulk's retirement as principal. It was formatted as a letter, written by Rob himself.

== Notable alumni ==
- Mekale McKay, NFL player
- J.J. Weaver, University of Kentucky Football player
