= Trey Williams (disambiguation) =

Trey Williams may refer to:

- Trey Williams (musician), drummer for Dying Fetus
- Trey Williams (footballer), American football player
