= Maea =

Maea is a name. Notable people with this name include:

- Des Maea (born 1969), New Zealand rugby player
- Maea David (born 1972), New Zealand rugby coach player
- Maea Teuhema (born 1996), American American football player
- Terepai Maea (born 1967), Cook Islands boxer
