= San Antonio Commanders =

Defunct American football franchise

Logo

General information
- Founded: 2018
- Folded: 2019
- Colors: Maroon, red, silver & white

Personnel
- Head coach: Mike Riley
- President: Vic Gregovits

Team history
- San Antonio Commanders (2019)

Home fields
- Alamodome (2019)

League / conference affiliations
- Alliance of American Football: Western Conference (2019)

The San Antonio Commanders were a professional American football team based in San Antonio, Texas, and one of the eight members of the Alliance of American Football (AAF). The league began play in February 2019. The team played their home games at the Alamodome. The team was led by head coach Mike Riley.

On April 2, 2019, the league's football operations were reportedly suspended, and on April 4 the league allowed players to leave their contracts to sign with NFL teams. The league filed for Chapter 7 bankruptcy on April 17, 2019. The league left debts of over $1.4 million to three local hotels and $200,000 to a catering business.

== History ==
The Alliance San Antonio charter team of the Alliance of American Football spring league was announced on June 21, 2018. Also, the league announced former San Diego Chargers coach Mike Riley as head coach and former Dallas Cowboys fullback Daryl Johnston as General Manager of the team. The western four teams' names and logos were revealed on September 25 with San Antonio as the Commanders. The name is a tribute to San Antonio's military history, with maroon and silver representing the city and the small swords carried by military officers, respectively.

The final 52-man roster was set on January 30, 2019. The team's first game was a 15–6 win at home against the San Diego Fleet on Saturday, February 9, 2019.

The Commanders, who drew an average of approximately 27,720 fans to each home game, were by far the best-attended team in the AAF.

The league was suspended on April 2, 2019, with about 20 minutes left in the Commanders' practice. "It ended in the blink of an eye. Like that," Riley said later.

The next year, the XFL began discussions about relocating one of its eight teams to San Antonio; this would eventually bear fruit with the San Antonio Brahmas in 2023.

== Final roster ==
2019 San Antonio Commanders final roster
Quarterbacks: 10 Dustin Vaughan; 12 Marquise Williams; 5 Logan Woodside; Running backs: 27 David Cobb; 20 Kenneth Farrow; 22 Aaron Green; 35 Trey Williams; Wide receivers: 14 Demarcus Ayers; 18 John Diarse; 82 Mekale McKay; 19 Alonzo Moore; 15 Darius Prince; 80 Josh Stewart; 84 Greg Ward; Tight ends: 85 Cameron Clear; 83 Cole Hunt; 89 Stehly Reden; 88 Evan Rodriguez	Offensive linemen: 65 Dillon DeBoer C; 67 Brian Folkerts C; 79 Mason Gentry G/T; 72 Jaryd Jones-Smith T; 61 Fred Lauina G; 69 Andrew McDonald T; 73 Cyril Richardson G; 76 Maea Teuhema G; Defensive linemen: 97 Richard Ash NT; 94 Deion Barnes DE; 96 Winston Craig DE; 99 Matthew Godin NT; 90 Joey Mbu NT; 93 Arthur Miley DE	Linebackers: 52 Jayrone Elliott OLB; 56 Danny Ezechukwu ILB; 58 Tyrone Holmes OLB; 57 Joel Lanning ILB; 53 Austin Larkin OLB; 51 Darnell Leslie ILB; 55 Nick Temple ILB; 54 Shaan Washington OLB; Defensive backs: 41 De'Vante Bausby CB; 25 Kurtis Drummond FS; 30 Chase Dutra SS; 33 Zack Sanchez CB; 32 Derron Smith SS; 28 Orion Stewart FS; 24 Robert Taylor CB; 21 Duke Thomas CB; 23 Jordan Thomas CB; Special teams: 49 Scott Daly LS; 9 Nick Rose K; 6 Joseph Zema P	Reserve lists: 31 Bryce Jones CB (IR); -- Ashaad Mabry NT (IR); 29 Darryl Morris CB (IR); 11 Riley Smith WR (IR); Rights list: Daniel Braverman WR; 52 Active, 5 Inactive

=== Allocation pool ===
The team's assigned area, which designated player rights, included the following:

Colleges

- Abilene Christian
- Angelo State
- Baylor
- Houston
- Houston Baptist
- Incarnate Word
- Lamar
- Midwestern State
- North Texas
- Oklahoma
- Prairie View A&M
- Rice
- Sam Houston
- SMU
- Stephen F. Austin
- Tarleton State
- TCU
- Texas
- Texas A&M
- Texas A&M–Kingsville
- UT Permian Basin
- Texas Southern
- Texas State
- Toledo
- UTSA
- West Texas A&M

National Football League (NFL)

- Dallas Cowboys
- Houston Texans
- Kansas City Chiefs
- Philadelphia Eagles

Canadian Football League (CFL)

- Saskatchewan Roughriders

== Staff ==
San Antonio commanders staff
Front office: General manager – Daryl Johnston; Director of player personnel – Robert Morris; Director of football operations – John Peterson; Head coach: Head coach – Mike Riley; Offensive coaches: Offensive Coordinator/Quarterbacks – Matt Troxel; Running backs – Lyle Moevao; Wide Receivers – Keith Williams; Tight ends – Josh Oglesby; Offensive line/Run game coordinator – Jonathan Himebauch	Defensive coaches: Defensive Coordinator/Inside linebackers – Jim Grobe; Defensive line/Special teams – Jeff McInerney; Outside linebackers – James Rodgers; Defensive backs – Bill Bradley; Assistant defensive backs – Kenny Watson

== 2019 season ==
2019 San Antonio Commanders season
- General manager: Daryl Johnston
- Head coach: Mike Riley
- Home stadium: Alamodome

Results
- Record: 5–3
- League place: 1st (tie), Western Conference

=== Final standings ===
2019 Alliance of American Football standings
Eastern Conference
Club	W–L	PCT	CONF	PF	PA	DIFF	SOS	SOV	STK
(x) – Orlando Apollos	7–1	.875	5–0	236	136	100	.406	.375	W2
(x) – Birmingham Iron	5–3	.625	3–2	165	133	32	.406	.300	W1
(e) – Memphis Express	2–6	.250	1–4	152	194	-42	.578	.500	L1
(e) – Atlanta Legends	2–6	.250	1–4	88	213	-125	.609	.438	L3
Western Conference
Club	W–L	PCT	CONF	PF	PA	DIFF	SOS	SOV	STK
San Antonio Commanders	5–3	.625	3–2	158	154	4	.516	.450	L1
Arizona Hotshots	5–3	.625	3–2	186	144	42	.469	.500	W3
San Diego Fleet	3–5	.375	2–3	158	161	-3	.469	.417	L3
Salt Lake Stallions	3–5	.375	2–3	135	143	-8	.547	.417	W1
(x)–clinched playoff berth; (e)–eliminated from playoff contention

=== Schedule ===
==== Preseason ====
Week	Date	Opponent	Result	Record	Venue
–	January 28	Atlanta Legends	W 37–11	1–0	Alamodome

==== Regular season ====
Week	Date	Opponent	Result	Record	Venue	Attendance
1	February 9	San Diego Fleet	W 15–6	1–0	Alamodome	27,857
2	February 17	Orlando Apollos	L 29–37	1–1	Alamodome	29,176
3	February 24	at San Diego Fleet	L 11–31	1–2	SDCCU Stadium	14,789
4	March 3	at Birmingham Iron	W 12–11	2–2	Legion Field	6,539
5	March 10	at Arizona Hotshots	W 29–25	3–2	Sun Devil Stadium	9,351
6	March 17	at Atlanta Legends	W 37–6	4–2	Georgia State Stadium	10,619
7	March 23	Salt Lake Stallions	W 19–15	5–2	Alamodome	30,345
8	March 31	Arizona Hotshots	L 6–23	5–3	Alamodome	23,504
9	April 6	Memphis Express	Not played		Alamodome	
10	April 12	at Salt Lake Stallions	Not played		Rice–Eccles Stadium	

† Changed from original time and network.

=== Game summaries ===
==== Week 1: San Diego ====
Week One: San Diego Fleet at San Antonio Commanders – Game summary

Quarter	1	2	3	4	Total
Fleet	0	6	0	0	6
Commanders	0	6	0	9	15

at Alamodome, San Antonio, Texas

- Date: February 9
- Game time: 7:00 p.m. CT
- Game weather: Indoors
- Game attendance: 27,857
- Referee: Jeff Heaser
- TV announcers (CBS): Spero Dedes, Trent Green, Tiki Barber, and Jamie Erdahl
- NoExtraPoints AAF

Game information

First Quarter
No scoring plays
Second Quarter

- (10:39) SA – Nick Rose 29-yard field goal, Commanders 3–0
- (3:50) SA – Nick Rose 23-yard field goal, Commanders 6–0
- (1:17) SD – Donny Hageman 47-yard field goal, Commanders 6–3
- (0:02) SD – Donny Hageman 28-yard field goal, Tied 6–6

Third Quarter
No scoring plays
Fourth Quarter

- (14:56) SA – Kenneth Farrow II 3-yard run (run failed), Commanders 12–6
- (3:34) SA – Nick Rose 28-yard field goal, Commanders 15–6

Top Passers

- SD – Mike Bercovici – 15/25, 176 yards, 2 INT
- SA – Logan Woodside – 18/36, 255 yards, 2 INT

Top Rushers

- SD – Ja'Quan Gardner – 8 carries, 55 yards
- SA – Aaron Green – 6 carries, 43 yards

Top Receivers

- SD – Brian Brown – 5 receptions, 66 yards
- SA – Mekale McKay – 5 receptions, 80 yards

Top Tackler

- SD – Damontre Moore, 5 tackles
- SA – Orion Stewart, 4 tackles

With the win, the Commanders started 1–0.

==== Week 2: Orlando ====
Week Two: Orlando Apollos at San Antonio Commanders – Game summary

Quarter	1	2	3	4	Total
Apollos	0	17	3	17	37
Commanders	12	6	11	0	29

at Alamodome, San Antonio, Texas

- Date: February 17
- Game time: 3:00 p.m. CT
- Game weather: Indoors
- Game attendance: 29,176
- Referee: James Carter
- TV announcers (CBS Sports Network): Ben Holden, Adam Archuleta, John Schriffen
- NoExtraPoints AAF

Game information

First Quarter

- (8:06) SA – Kenneth Farrow 15-yard rush (rush failed), Commanders 6–0
- (0:00) SA – Logan Woodside 1-yard pass to Evan Rodriguez (rush failed), Commanders 12–0

Second Quarter

- (12:52) ORL – De'Veon Smith 1-yard rush (De'Veon Smith rush), Commanders 12–8
- (8:20) SA – Nick Rose 50-yard field goal, Commanders 15–8
- (5:37) ORL – Elliott Fry 35-yard field goal, Commanders 15–11
- (1:54) ORL – Garrett Gilbert 21-yard pass to Charles Johnson (pass failed), Apollos 17–15
- (0:00) SA – Nick Rose 38-yard field goal, Commanders 18–17

Third Quarter

- (9:28) SA – Nick Rose 37-yard field goal, Commanders 21–17
- (8:10) SA – Garrett Gilbert (ORL) fumble recovered by Joey Mbu and returned 8 yards for touchdown (Logan Woodside pass to Evan Rodriguez), Commanders 29–17
- (3:12) ORL – Elliott Fry 24-yard field goal, Commanders 29–20

Fourth Quarter

- (13:51) ORL – Elliott Fry 47-yard field goal, Commanders 29–23
- (7:49) ORL – Garrett Gilbert 23-yard pass to Jalin Marshall (pass failed), Tied 29–29
- (7:02) ORL – Keith Reaser 39-yard interception return for touchdown (Garrett Gilbert pass to Rannell Hall), Apollos 37–29

Top Passers

- ORL – Garrett Gilbert – 19/28, 393 yards, 2 TD
- SA – Logan Woodside – 20/39, 223 yards, 1 TD, 1 INT

Top Rushers

- ORL – D'Ernest Johnson – 8 carries, 57 yards
- SA – Kenneth Farrow – 13 carries, 74 yards, 1 TD

Top Receivers

- ORL – Charles Johnson – 7 receptions, 192 yards, 1 TD
- SA – De'Marcus Ayers – 5 receptions, 80 yards

First loss in Commanders history. San Antonio fell to 1-1.

==== Week 3: at San Diego ====
Week Three: San Antonio Commanders at San Diego Fleet – Game summary

Quarter	1	2	3	4	Total
Commanders	8	0	3	0	11
Fleet	6	16	6	3	31

at SDCCU Stadium, San Diego California

- Date: February 24
- Game time: 7:00 p.m. CT
- Game attendance: 14,789
- Referee: Tra Blake
- TV announcers (NFL Network): Dan Hellie, Marvin Lewis, Maurice Jones-Drew
- NoExtraPoints AAF

Game information

First Quarter

- (14:47) SA– Logan Woodside 47-yard pass to Mekale McKay (Logan Woodside pass to Evan Rodriguez), Commanders 8–0
- (3:17) SD – Philip Nelson 3-yard pass to Nelson Spruce (pass failed), Commanders 8–6

Second Quarter

- (11:02) SD – A. J. Tarpley 27-yard interception return (Terrell Watson rush), Fleet 14–8
- (2:13) SD – Philip Nelson 18-yard pass to Nelson Spruce (Terrell Watson rush), Fleet 22–8

Third Quarter

- (8:21) SD – Ja'Quan Gardner 83-yard run (pass failed), Fleet 28–8
- (3:29) SA – Nick Rose 23-yard field goal, Fleet 28–11

Fourth Quarter

- (11:53) SD – Donny Hageman 35-yard field goal, Fleet 31–11

Top Passers

- SA – Logan Woodside – 12/23, 151 yards, 1 TD, 2 INT
- SD – Philip Nelson – 17/25, 193 yards, 2 TDs, 1 INT

Top Rushers

- SA – Trey Williams – 7 carries, 75 yards
- SD – Ja'Quan Gardner – 12 carries, 122 yards, 1 TD

Top Receivers

- SA – Mekale McKay – 4 receptions, 91 yards, 1 TD
- SD – Nelson Spruce – 4 receptions, 50 yards, 2 TDs

First time in Commanders history with consecutive losses. Commanders drop to 1-2.

==== Week 4: at Birmingham ====
Week Four: San Antonio Commanders at Birmingham Iron – Game summary

Quarter	1	2	3	4	Total
Commanders	3	0	6	3	12
Iron	0	3	0	8	11

at Legion Field, Birmingham, Alabama

- Date: March 3
- Game time: 3:00 p.m. CT
- Game weather: Storm warning
- Game attendance: 6,539
- Referee: John O'Neill
- TV announcers (CBS Sports Network): Ben Holden, Adam Archuleta, John Schriffen
- NoExtraPoints AAF

Game information

First Quarter

- (2:18) SA – Nick Rose 39-yard field goal, Commanders 3–0

Second Quarter

- (0:26) BIRM – Nick Novak 33-yard field goal, Tied 3–3

Third Quarter

- (1:46) SA – Trey Williams 12-yard rush (pass failed), Commanders 9–3

Fourth Quarter

- (3:58) SA – Nick Rose 20-yard field goal, Commanders 12–3
- (1:41) BIRM – Trent Richardson 1-yard rush (Luis Perez pass to DeVozea Felton), Commanders 12–11

Top Passers

- SA – Logan Woodside – 11/25, 44 yards
- BIRM – Luis Perez – 19/39, 202 yards, 2 INT

Top Rushers

- SA – Kenneth Farrow – 30 carries, 142 yards
- BIRM – Brandon Ross – 9 carries, 64 yards

Top Receivers

- SA – Greg Ward – 2 receptions, 24 yards
- BIRM – Wes Saxton – 3 receptions, 54 yards

First road win in Commanders history. Commanders improve to 2-2.

==== Week 5: at Arizona ====
Week Five: San Antonio Commanders at Arizona Hotshots – Game summary

Quarter	1	2	3	4	Total
Commanders	14	12	0	3	29
Hotshots	0	0	8	17	25

at Sun Devil Stadium, Tempe, Arizona

- Date: March 10
- Game time: 7:00 p.m. CT
- Game attendance: 9,351
- Referee: Brandon Cruse
- TV announcers (NFL Network): Matt "Money" Smith, Marvin Lewis
- NoExtraPoints AAF

Game information

First Quarter

- (12:07) SA – Derron Smith 66-yard interception return (pass failed), Commanders 6–0
- (4:58) SA – Logan Woodside 54-yard pass to Mekale McKay (Logan Woodside rush), Commanders 14–0

Second Quarter

- (12:19) SA – Kenneth Farrow 1-yard rush (rush failed), Commanders 20–0
- (3:36) SA – Logan Woodside 5-yard pass to Stehly Reden (pass failed), Commanders 26–0

Third Quarter

- (5:31) ARIZ – John Wolford 45-yard pass to Rashad Ross (John Wolford rush), Commanders 26–8

Fourth Quarter

- (13:04) ARIZ – Nick Folk 23-yard field goal, Commanders 26–11
- (7:52) SA – Nick Rose 21-yard field goal, Commanders 29–11
- (3:30) ARIZ – John Wolford 4-yard pass to Thomas Duarte (John Wolford pass to Rashad Ross), Commanders 29–19
- (1:20) ARIZ – Tim Cook 1-yard rush (rush failed), Commanders 29–25

Top Passers

- SA – Logan Woodside – 21/27, 290 yards, 2 TD, 1 INT
- ARIZ – John Wolford – 19/33, 246 yards, 2 TD, 3 INT

Top Rushers

- SA – Kenneth Farrow – 12 carries, 25 yards, 1 TD
- ARIZ – Tim Cook – 12 carries, 33 yards, 1 TD

Top Receivers

- SA – Mekale McKay – 5 receptions, 91 yards, 1 TD
- ARIZ – Rashad Ross – 5 receptions, 106 yards, 1 TD

First time in Commanders history with consecutive wins. Commanders improve to 3-2.

==== Week 6: at Atlanta ====
Week Six: San Antonio Commanders at Atlanta Legends – Game summary

Quarter	1	2	3	4	Total
Commanders	6	20	3	8	37
Legends	0	6	0	0	6

at Georgia State Stadium, Atlanta, Georgia

- Date: March 17
- Game time: 3:00 p.m. CT
- Game attendance: 10,619
- Referee: James Carter
- TV announcers (CBS Sports Network): Ben Holden, Adam Archuleta, John Schriffen
- NoExtraPoints AAF

Game information

First Quarter

- (7:38) SA – Kenneth Farrow 13-yard rush (pass failed), Commanders 6–0

Second Quarter

- (13:35) SA – Logan Woodside 5-yard pass to Mekale McKay (Logan Woodside pass to Mekale McKay), Commanders 14–0
- (9:55) SA – Logan Woodside 33-yard pass to Evan Rodriguez (pass failed), Commanders 20–0
- (2:37) ATL – Aaron Murray 1-yard pass to Tarean Folston (pass failed), Commanders 20–6
- (1:00) SA – Greg Ward Jr. 79-yard punt return (pass failed), Commanders 26–6

Third Quarter

- (8:39) SA – Nick Rose 23-yard field goal, Commanders 29–6

Fourth Quarter

- (8:40) SA – Derron Smith 87-yard interception return (Kenneth Farrow rush), Commanders 37–6

Top Passers

- SA – Logan Woodside – 17/23, 164 yards, 2 TD
- ATL – Aaron Murray – 30/41, 215 yards, 1 TD, 3 INT

Top Rushers

- SA – Kenneth Farrow – 9 carries, 35 yards, 1 TD
- ATL – Brandon Radcliff – 6 carries, 24 yards

Top Receivers

- SA – Cam Clear – 5 receptions, 45 yards
- ATL – Keith Towbridge – 5 receptions, 42 yards

Commanders improve to 4-2.

==== Week 7: Salt Lake ====
Week Seven: Salt Lake Stallions at San Antonio Commanders – Game summary

Quarter	1	2	3	4	Total
Stallions	3	3	3	6	15
Commanders	6	3	0	10	19

at Alamodome, San Antonio, Texas

- Date: March 23
- Game time: 7:00 p.m. CT
- Game weather: Indoors
- Game attendance: 30,345
- Referee: John O'Neill
- TV announcers (NFL Network): Dan Hellie, Steve Mariucci, Jason Fisher
- NoExtraPoints AAF

Game information

First Quarter

- (9:17) SL – Taylor Bertolet 32-yard field goal, Stallions 3–0
- (4:42) SA – Logan Woodside 21-yard pass to Mekale McKay (pass failed), Commanders 6–3

Second Quarter

- (14:10) SL – Taylor Bertolet 53-yard field goal, Tied 6–6
- (0:05) SA – Nick Rose 23-yard field goal, Commanders 9–6

Third Quarter

- (9:20) SL – Taylor Bertolet 52-yard field goal, Tied 9–9

Fourth Quarter

- (5:25) SA – Marquise Williams 36-yard pass to Trey Williams (Marquise Williams pass to Greg Ward Jr.), Commanders 17–9
- (1:54) SL – Josh Woodrum 21-yard pass to Terrell Newby (pass intercepted by De'Vante Bausby and returned for defensive 2-pt), Commanders 19–15

Top Passers

- SL – Josh Woodrum – 22/35, 229 yards, 1 TD, 1 INT
- SA – Logan Woodside – 13/19, 164 yards, 1 TD, 1 INT

Top Rushers

- SL – Joel Bouagnon – 9 carries, 35 yards
- SA – Marquise Williams – 6 carries, 19 yards

Top Receivers

- SL – Nick Truesdell – 4 receptions, 74 yards
- SA – Evan Rodriguez – 3 receptions, 71 yards

Commanders improve to 5-2. Also, this game marks the first time in league history that single game attendance was above 30,000.

==== Week 8: Arizona ====
Week Eight: Arizona Hotshots at San Antonio Commanders – Game summary

Quarter	1	2	3	4	Total
Hotshots	6	9	0	8	23
Commanders	0	3	3	0	6

at Alamodome, San Antonio, Texas

- Date: March 31
- Game time: 7:00 p.m. CT
- Game weather: Indoors
- Game attendance: 23,504
- Referee: Tra Blake
- TV announcers (NFL Network): Matt "Money" Smith, Marvin Lewis
- NoExtraPoints AAF

Game information

First Quarter

- (9:18) ARIZ – John Wolford 58-yard pass to Rashad Ross (pass failed), Hotshots 6–0

Second Quarter

- (14:06) ARIZ – Nick Folk 25-yard field goal, Hotshots 9–0
- (6:56) ARIZ – Tim Cook 6-yard rush (pass failed), Hotshots 15–0
- (0:47) SA – Nick Rose 54-yard field goal, Hotshots 15–3

Third Quarter

- (9:16) SA – Nick Rose 35-yard field goal, Hotshots 15–6

Fourth Quarter

- (4:10) ARIZ – Tim Cook 20-yard rush (John Wolford pass to Connor Hamlett), Hotshots 23–6

Top Passers

- ARIZ – John Wolford – 17/23, 216 yards, 1 TD
- SA – Marquise Williams – 17/23, 130 yards

Top Rushers

- ARIZ – Justin Stockton – 4 carries, 34 yards
- SA – David Cobb – 9 carries, 59 yards

Top Receivers

- ARIZ – Rashad Ross – 4 receptions, 78 yards, 1 TD
- SA – Greg Ward Jr. – 5 receptions, 48 yards

== Media ==
In addition to league-wide television coverage through NFL Network, CBS Sports Network, TNT, and B/R Live, Commanders' games were also broadcast on local radio by KZDC, an ESPN Radio affiliate. The team also had a television agreement with local station KMYS of the Sinclair Broadcast Group to carry all Commanders' games that were not broadcast nationally.
