= Trey Williams =

American football player (born 1992)

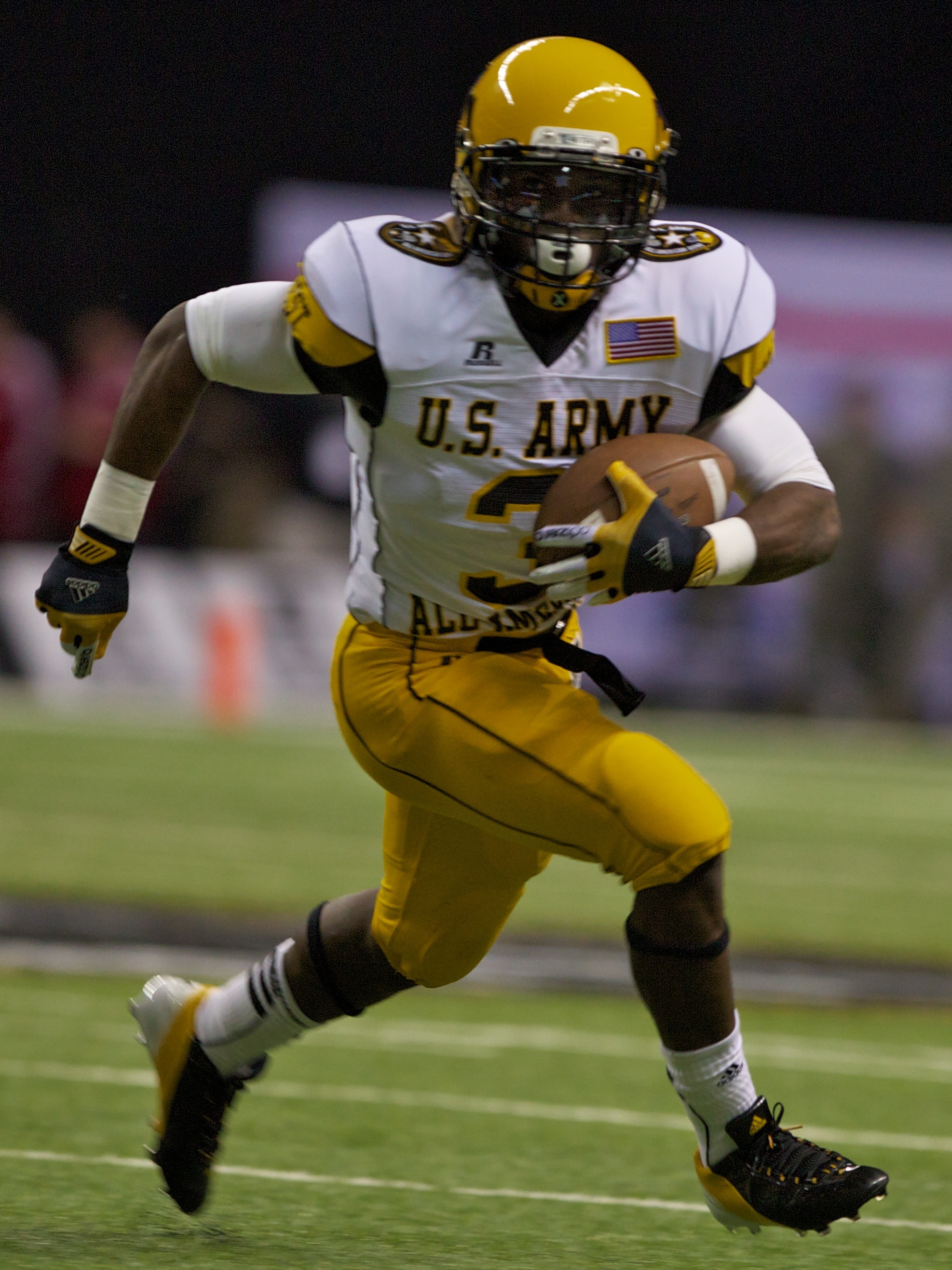
- Williams at the 2012 U.S. Army All-American Bowl

No. 3, 30, 40
- Position: Running back

Personal information
- Born: December 11, 1992 (age 33); Houston, Texas, U.S.
- Listed height: 5 ft 7 in (1.70 m)
- Listed weight: 200 lb (91 kg)

Career information
- High school: Dekaney (Spring, Texas)
- College: Texas A&M (2012–2014)
- NFL draft: 2015: undrafted

Career history
- Washington Redskins (2015)*; Dallas Cowboys (2015); New England Patriots (2015); Miami Dolphins (2015)*; Indianapolis Colts (2015); Pittsburgh Steelers (2017)*; Toronto Argonauts (2017)*; Dallas Cowboys (2017); San Antonio Commanders (2019); Seattle Dragons (2020); Calgary Stampeders (2021)*; Toronto Argonauts (2021); New Jersey Generals (2022–2023); Pittsburgh Maulers (2024)*; Memphis Showboats (2024)
- * Offseason or practice squad member only

Career NFL statistics
- Rushing yards: 12
- Rushing average: 6.0
- Stats at Pro Football Reference

Trey Williams (born December 11, 1992) is an American former professional football player who was a running back in the National Football League (NFL). He signed with the Washington Redskins as an undrafted free agent in 2015. Williams was also a member of the Dallas Cowboys, New England Patriots, Miami Dolphins, Indianapolis Colts, Pittsburgh Steelers, Toronto Argonauts, San Antonio Commanders, Seattle Dragons, Calgary Stampeders, New Jersey Generals, Pittsburgh Maulers, and Memphis Showboats. He played college football for the Texas A&M Aggies.

== Early life ==
Williams attended Dekaney High School in Spring, Texas, a suburb of north Houston, where he was a three-year letterer and starting tailback for the Dekaney football team. As a sophomore, he rushed for 1,930 yards, 18 touchdowns, and was named District 13-5A Newcomer of the Year. As a junior, he had 251 carries for 2,290 yards and 20 touchdowns, receiving District 13-5A MVP and Class 5A second-team All-State honors.

As a senior, he had 447 carries for 3,890 yards, 48 touchdowns, 10 kickoff returns for 346 yards and 2 touchdowns, to go along with 6 punt returns for 113 yards and one touchdown. He helped lead Dekaney High School to its first ever state championship game, where the Wildcats beat previously undefeated Cibolo Steele High School 34–14 to win the championship. Dekaney was ranked the 23rd best team in the nation by Maxpreps, and Williams himself was listed as a 5-star recruit by 247sports. He was ranked as the 2nd best running back in the nation, the 4th best player in Texas, and the 18th overall best athlete in the nation. ESPN also called Williams the "fastest player in high school football".

Trey Williams finished his high school career with 8,110 yards rushing yards (8.7-yard avg.) and 86 touchdowns. He accepted an offer from Texas A&M over offers from Alabama, Arkansas, Auburn, Baylor, Florida, Louisville, LSU, Notre Dame, Oklahoma, Oklahoma State, Oregon, Texas, and several other colleges.

Trey Williams additionally played baseball and had a .383 batting average.

== College career ==
As a true freshman, he was the team's fourth leading rusher with 376 yards on 65 carries and 5 rushing touchdowns.

As a sophomore, he was used as an all-purpose running back, tallying 407 rushing yards (7-yard avg.), 6 rushing touchdowns, 10 receptions for 54 receiving yards and 706 kickoff return yards for 1,167 all-purpose yards. He averaged 25.2 yards per return, including a career-long return of 97 yards against Mississippi State University. He had 83 rushing yards against the University of Arkansas. He scored two touchdowns against the University of Mississippi

As a junior, he led the team with 474 rushing yards and 6 touchdowns on 70 carries (6.8-yard avg.). He also made 14 receptions for 59 yards, 13 returns for 318 yards, including a 75-yard return against the University of Alabama. He was second on the team with 851 all-purpose yards. He rushed for 1,343 yards on 204 carries with 18 touchdowns during his college career.

He ultimately decided to forego his senior season and instead declared for the 2015 NFL draft.

== Professional career ==
Pre-draft measurables
Height	Weight	Arm length	Hand span	40-yard dash	10-yard split	20-yard split	20-yard shuttle	Three-cone drill	Vertical jump	Broad jump	Bench press
5 ft 7 1/2 in (1.71 m)	195 lb (88 kg)	29 7/8 in (0.76 m)	8 1/4 in (0.21 m)	4.47 s	1.55 s	2.58 s	4.12 s	6.84 s	33.5 in (0.85 m)	9 ft 11 in (3.02 m)	18 reps
All values from NFL Combine/Pro Day

=== Washington Redskins ===
Williams was signed as an undrafted free agent by the Washington Redskins after the 2015 NFL Draft on May 7. On his first-ever professional football carry, Williams rushed for a 38-yard gain against the Dallas Cowboys in the preseason.

=== Dallas Cowboys (first stint) ===
On November 4, 2015, he was signed by the Cowboys from the practice squad of the Washington Redskins to replace the recently waived Joseph Randle. He was declared inactive due to injury for four games, before being released on November 30 to make room for quarterback Kellen Moore.

=== New England Patriots ===
Williams was claimed off waivers by the New England Patriots on December 1, 2015. On December 10, 2015, Williams was waived. Williams was re-signed to New England's practice squad on December 12, 2015. On December 16, 2015, he was released by the Patriots.

=== Miami Dolphins ===
On December 17, 2015, Williams was signed to the Miami Dolphins practice squad.

=== Indianapolis Colts ===
On December 21, 2015, Williams was signed off of the Dolphins practice squad by the Indianapolis Colts. He appeared in two games, where he rushed for 12 yards on two carries. Williams was released by the Colts on August 29, 2016.

=== Pittsburgh Steelers ===
On February 14, 2017, Williams was signed by the Pittsburgh Steelers. He appeared in one game in the preseason and returned a punt for a 64-yard touchdown. He was waived on September 2, 2017.

=== Toronto Argonauts (first stint) ===
On October 9, 2017, Williams signed a practice roster agreement with the Toronto Argonauts of the Canadian Football League (CFL) and was released a week later.

=== Dallas Cowboys (second stint) ===
On November 2, 2017, Williams was signed to the Cowboys' practice squad for running back depth after the reinstatement of Ezekiel Elliott's 6-game suspension. He was promoted to the active roster on November 26, 2017, where he appeared on special teams. On December 18, 2017, he was waived by the Cowboys and re-signed to the practice squad.

He signed a reserve/future contract with the Cowboys on January 1, 2018. He was waived on September 1.

=== San Antonio Commanders ===
On January 2, 2019, Williams signed with the San Antonio Commanders of the Alliance of American Football. He was a backup behind Kenneth Farrow until the league folded in April 2019. Although he missed several games due to an undisclosed shoulder injury, he posted 40 carries for 205 yards (5.12-yard avg.) and one touchdown.

=== Seattle Dragons ===
In October 2019, Williams was a number one pick by the Seattle Dragons via the 2020 XFL draft. In March, amid the COVID-19 pandemic, the league announced that it would be cancelling the rest of the season. He had 34 carries for 127 yards (third on the team) and a touchdown, additionally catching 8 passes for 44 yards and another touchdown. He had his contract terminated when the league suspended operations on April 10, 2020.

=== Calgary Stampeders ===
Williams signed with the Calgary Stampeders of the CFL on March 19, 2021. He was released at the end of training camp on July 29, 2021.

=== Toronto Argonauts (second stint) ===
On August 10, 2021, Williams signed with the Argonauts. He was released in October 2021.

=== New Jersey Generals ===
On February 22, 2022, Trey Williams was selected in the United States Football League's inaugural draft to the New Jersey Generals. Williams would have several starts throughout the season and would go onto rush for 579 yards and 2 touchdowns on 118 carries, with 126 receiving yards and one more touchdown. He ran for a 62-yard touchdown against the Philadelphia Stars, in a play that was named the USFL's Play of the Week.

=== Pittsburgh Maulers ===
On October 4, 2023, Williams signed with the Pittsburgh Maulers of the USFL. The Maulers folded when the XFL and USFL merged to create the United Football League (UFL).

=== Memphis Showboats ===
On February 19, 2024, Williams signed with the Memphis Showboats of the United Football League (UFL). He was released on April 15, 2024.
