= Logan Woodside =

American football player (born 1995)

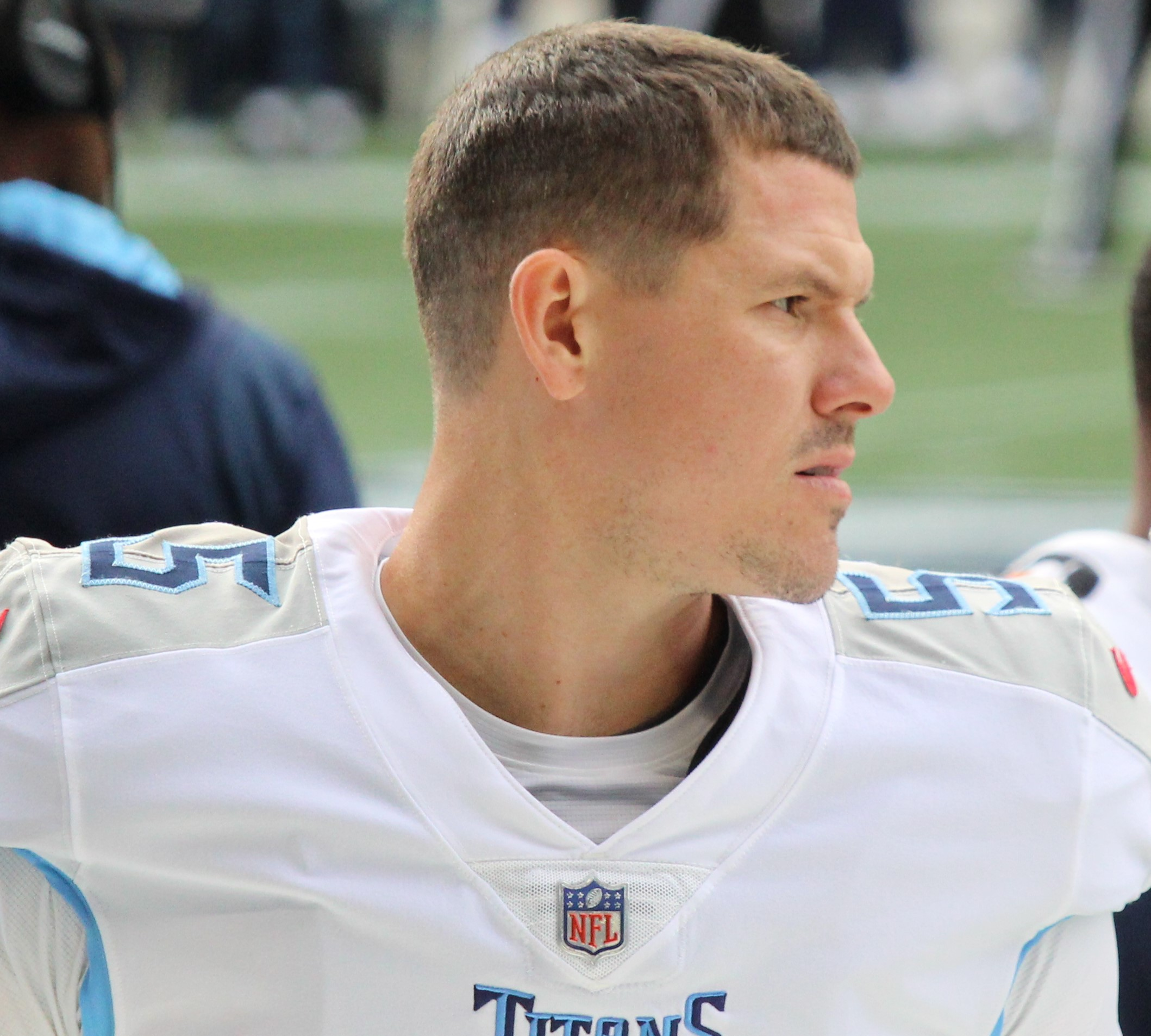
- Woodside with the Tennessee Titans in 2021

Profile
- Position: Quarterback

Personal information
- Born: January 27, 1995 (age 31); Frankfort, Kentucky, U.S.
- Listed height: 6 ft 1 in (1.85 m)
- Listed weight: 213 lb (97 kg)

Career information
- High school: Franklin County (Frankfort)
- College: Toledo (2013–2017)
- NFL draft: 2018: 7th round, 249th overall pick

Career history
- Cincinnati Bengals (2018)*; Tennessee Titans (2018)*; San Antonio Commanders (2019); Tennessee Titans (2019–2022); Atlanta Falcons (2022–2023); Cincinnati Bengals (2024); Pittsburgh Steelers (2025)*; Arizona Cardinals (2025)*
- * Offseason or practice squad member only

Awards and highlights
- MAC Offensive Player of the Year (2017); MAC Most Valuable Player (2017); 2× First-team All-MAC (2016, 2017)

Career NFL statistics as of 2025
- Passing attempts: 7
- Passing completions: 4
- Completion percentage: 57.1%
- TD–INT: 0–1
- Passing yards: 34
- Passer rating: 30.4
- Stats at Pro Football Reference

Logan Miles Woodside (born January 27, 1995) is an American professional football quarterback. He played college football for the Toledo Rockets and was selected by the Cincinnati Bengals in the seventh round of the 2018 NFL draft. Woodside was also previously a member of the Tennessee Titans, Atlanta Falcons, and Pittsburgh Steelers, as well as the San Antonio Commanders of the Alliance of American Football (AAF).

== Early life ==
Logan Miles Woodside was born on January 27, 1995, in Frankfort, Kentucky. He attended Franklin County High School in Frankfort.

== College career ==
=== 2014 season ===
After Alabama transfer Phillip Ely was injured, Woodside made 11 starts during the 2014 season. On September 12, 2014, he recorded 322 yards and three touchdowns in his season debut against Cincinnati. The next two weeks he ran in three touchdowns and threw another three against Ball State and Central Michigan. On October 25, Woodside recorded 225 yards and three touchdowns against UMass and did the same with 202 yards the next week against Kent State. On November 28, Woodside recorded a career-high five touchdowns against Eastern Michigan and Toledo ending the season as co-MAC West champs. He ranked fourth in passing efficiency and completion percentage in the MAC, leading the Rockets to a win over Arkansas State in the GoDaddy Bowl.

=== 2016 season ===
Woodside redshirted the 2015 season in favor of Ely. In the battle for the starter job for the 2016 season he competed against Michael Julian and Mitch Guadagni and earned the job. On September 2, 2016, Woodside recorded 371 yards and three touchdowns in the season-opener against Arkansas State. On September 10, he threw four touchdowns against Maine and another four against Fresno State the next week. On October 1, Woodside recorded a school-record 505 yards and five touchdowns against BYU. He was named MAC West Division Player and Male Scholar Athlete of the Week for his performance. On October 8, he recorded four touchdowns against Eastern Michigan and did the same against Central Michigan two weeks later. On November 9, Woodside scored three touchdowns in the 28-point comeback win against Northern Illinois, outscoring the Huskies 28–10 in the second half. In the 2016 Camellia Bowl, he recorded 247 yards and two touchdowns in the 28–31 loss. At the end of the season he recorded 4,129 yards and 45 touchdowns with 8 interceptions. He was named First-team All-MAC.

=== 2017 season ===
On August 31, 2017, Woodside threw for 314 yards in the season opening win against Elon. On September 16, he tied a school record, throwing six touchdowns in a 54–51 comeback win against Tulsa. The Rockets outscored Tulsa 44–23 after being down 21 points. He was named MAC West Division Offensive Player of the Week for his performance. The next week, Woodside threw for 342 yards and three touchdowns against #14 Miami. On October 21, he threw five touchdowns and 304 yards against Akron. On November 2, Woodside threw for 361 yards against Northern Illinois, becoming Toledo's career passing leader, breaking Bruce Gradkowski's record of 9,225 yards set from 2002 to 2005. On November 24, he recorded 300 yards and two touchdowns in a 37–10 win over Western Michigan, claiming the West Division crown. In the Mid-American Conference Championship game against Akron, Woodside recorded 307 yards and four touchdowns in a 45–28 win. At the end of the regular season he had thrown for a total of 3,451 yards and 23 touchdowns. His career total 10,083 yards set a new school record and was the first time in school history that the 10,000-yard mark was broken. Woodside was named First-team All-MAC, MAC Offensive Player of the Year, and received the Vern Smith Leadership Award. Woodside led the team to a 10–2 record, giving the Toledo Rockets their first participation in the MAC Football Championship since 2004.

== Professional career ==
Pre-draft measurables
Height	Weight	Arm length	Hand span	40-yard dash	10-yard split	20-yard split	20-yard shuttle	Three-cone drill	Vertical jump	Broad jump
6 ft 1 1/4 in (1.86 m)	213 lb (97 kg)	31 in (0.79 m)	9 3/4 in (0.25 m)	4.79 s	1.65 s	2.80 s	4.15 s	6.94 s	31.5 in (0.80 m)	8 ft 7 in (2.62 m)
All values from NFL Combine

=== Cincinnati Bengals (first stint) ===
Woodside was selected by the Cincinnati Bengals in the seventh round with the 249th overall pick in the 2018 NFL draft. He signed his rookie contract on May 11, 2018. Woodside was waived on September 1.

=== Tennessee Titans (first stint) ===
On September 3, 2018, Woodside was signed to the practice squad of the Tennessee Titans. He was released on September 25.

=== San Antonio Commanders ===
On November 27, 2018, Woodside was drafted by the San Antonio Commanders of the Alliance of American Football (AAF) in third round of the 2019 AAF QB Draft.

In Week 5 of the 2019 AAF season against the Arizona Hotshots, Woodside completed 21 of 27 passes for 290 yards, two touchdowns, an interception, and a 120.7 passer rating en route to a San Antonio 29–25 victory. During the first half, he had completed all but one throw for 192 yards and two touchdowns with a perfect 158.3 rating. Woodside was eventually named AAF Offensive Player of the Week.

=== Tennessee Titans (second stint) ===
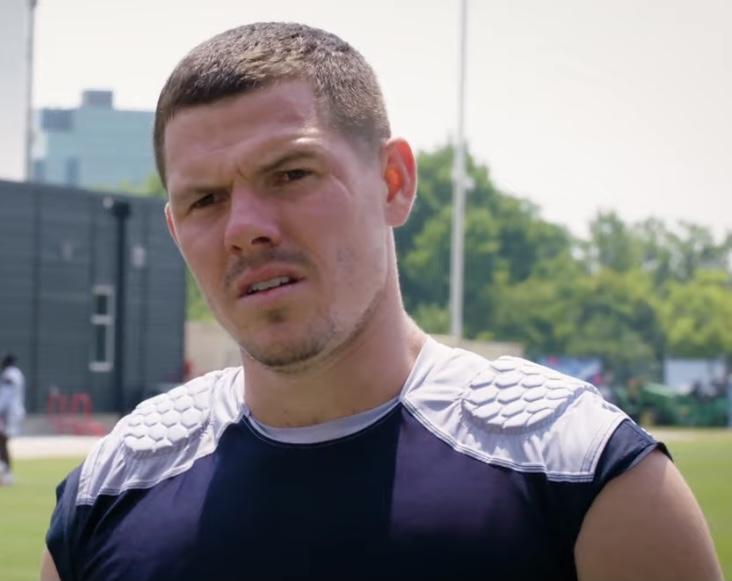
Woodside in 2021

After the AAF suspended football operations, Woodside re-signed with the Titans on April 8, 2019. He was waived on August 31, and was signed to the practice squad the next day. Woodside signed a reserve/future contract with the Titans on January 20, 2020.

On March 9, 2022, the Titans re-signed Woodside to a one-year deal. On August 30, Woodside was waived and was re-signed to the practice squad the next day.

=== Atlanta Falcons ===
On December 12, 2022, Woodside was signed by the Atlanta Falcons off the Titans practice squad.

=== Cincinnati Bengals (second stint) ===
On April 23, 2024, Woodside re-signed with the Cincinnati Bengals. He was released on August 27 and was signed back to the practice squad the next day. Woodside was promoted to the active roster on December 14. He was waived nine days later and was re-signed to the practice squad.

On April 16, 2025, Woodside re-signed with the Bengals on a one-year contract. He was released on July 20.

=== Pittsburgh Steelers ===
On August 7, 2025, Woodside signed with the Pittsburgh Steelers. He was released on August 22. On September 10, Woodside was re-signed to the Steelers' practice squad. He was released on October 21.

=== Arizona Cardinals ===
On December 24, 2025, Woodside was signed to the Arizona Cardinals' practice squad.

== Career statistics ==
=== College ===
Season	Team	Games			Passing								Rushing			
Season	Team	GP	GS	Record	Comp	Att	Pct	Yards	Avg	TD	Int	Rate	Att	Yards	Avg	TD
2013	Toledo	4	1	1−0	21	41	51.2	240	6.3	1	0	108.4	6	16	2.7	0
2014	Toledo	12	10	8−2	185	296	62.5	2,263	7.7	19	8	142.5	52	78	1.5	3
2015	Toledo	Redshirted (redshirt)														
2016	Toledo	13	13	9−4	289	418	69.1	4,129	11.1	45	9	183.3	37	−40	−1.1	0
2017	Toledo	14	14	11−3	264	411	64.2	3,882	9.9	28	8	162.2	51	34	0.7	1
Career		43	38	29−9	759	1,166	65.1	10,514	9.0	93	25	162.2	146	88	0.6	4

=== AAF ===
Year	Team	Games			Passing								Rushing				Sacked		Fumbles	
Year	Team	GP	GS	Record	Cmp	Att	Pct	Yds	Avg	TD	Int	Rtg	Att	Yds	Avg	TD	Sck	SckY	Fum	Lost
2019	SAN	8	8	5–3	116	201	57.7	1,385	6.9	7	8	73.9	26	45	1.7	0	18	108	1	1
Career		8	8	5–3	116	201	57.7	1,385	6.9	7	8	73.9	26	45	1.7	0	18	108	1	1

=== NFL ===
Year	Team	Games			Passing									Rushing					Sacks		Fumbles	
Year	Team	GP	GS	Record	Cmp	Att	Pct	Yds	Y/A	Lng	TD	Int	Rtg	Att	Yds	Y/A	Lng	TD	Sck	Yds	Fum	Lost
2019	TEN	0	0	—	DNP																	
2020	TEN	6	0	—	1	3	33.3	7	2.3	7	0	0	65.1	7	10	1.4	18	0	0	0	0	0
2021	TEN	5	0	—	0	0	—	0	—	0	0	0	—	6	-6	-1.0	-1	0	0	0	0	0
2022	TEN	0	0	—	DNP																	
2022	ATL	1	0	—	0	0	—	0	—	0	0	0	—	0	0	—	0	0	0	0	0	0
2023	ATL	1	0	—	3	4	75.0	27	6.8	12	0	1	53.1	1	6	6.0	6	0	1	7	0	0
2024	CIN	0	0	—	DNP																	
Career		13	0	—	4	7	57.1	34	4.9	12	0	1	30.4	14	10	0.7	18	0	1	7	0	0

== Personal life ==
Jason Woodside, Logan's father, played safety for Eastern Kentucky University from 1992 to 1995.

Woodside was arrested for speeding and DUI on June 9, 2018, in Bellevue, Kentucky. He was booked by police at 3:46 AM and blew a .112 blood-alcohol content. He was speeding in a parking lot shortly before the time of his arrest.
