= Nick Rose (American football) =

American football player (born 1994)

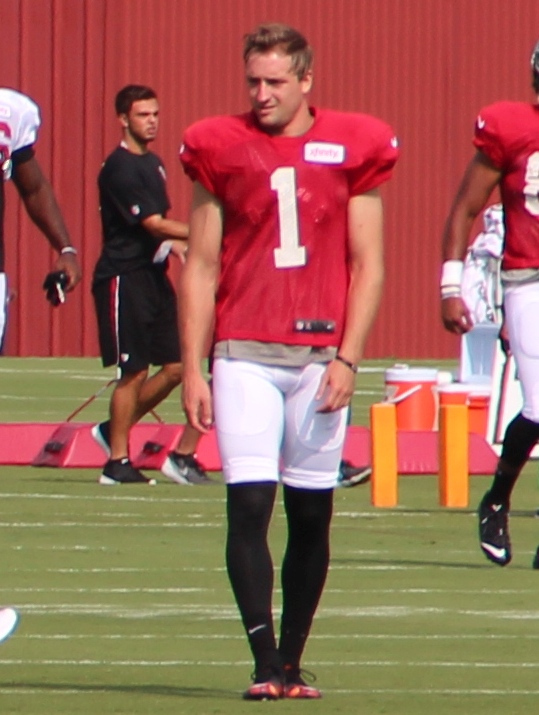
- Rose with the Atlanta Falcons in 2016

No. 6
- Position: Placekicker

Personal information
- Born: May 5, 1994 (age 32); Oahu, Hawaii, U.S.
- Listed height: 6 ft 2 in (1.88 m)
- Listed weight: 190 lb (86 kg)

Career information
- High school: Highland Park (University Park, Texas)
- College: Texas
- NFL draft: 2016: undrafted

Career history
- Atlanta Falcons (2016)*; San Francisco 49ers (2017)*; Washington Redskins (2017); Los Angeles Chargers (2017); New York Jets (2018)*; Houston Texans (2018)*; Los Angeles Chargers (2018); San Antonio Commanders (2019); New Jersey Generals (2022)
- * Offseason or practice squad member only

Career NFL statistics
- Field goals: 11
- Field goal attempts: 14
- Field goal%: 78.6
- Longest field goal: 55
- Touchbacks: 32
- Stats at Pro Football Reference

Nick Rose (born May 5, 1994) is an American former professional football player who was a placekicker in the National Football League (NFL). He played college football for the Texas Longhorns and was signed by the Atlanta Falcons as an undrafted free agent in 2016.

== College career ==
In 2012, Rose kicked a career-high 11 kickoffs against Ole Miss and a season-high 6 touchbacks against Baylor.

In 2013, Rose kicked a season-high 10 kickoffs against West Virginia and a season-high 5 touchbacks against Texas Tech.

Rose became the starting placekicker and kickoff specialist in the 2014 season. Rose kicked a season-high 9 kickoffs, a career-high 8 touchbacks, and converted a season-high 6 extra points against Iowa State. Rose kicked a career-high three field goals and a season-long 51-yard field goal against Oklahoma State. Rose finished the 2014 season converting 14-21 (67%) field goals and 30-of-32 (94%) extra points for 72 total points.

In 2015, Rose kicked a season-high 10 kickoffs, a season-high 8 touchbacks, and converted a career-high 8 extra points against Kansas. Rose kicked a season-high 3 field goals and a career-long 53-yard field goal against Baylor. Rose finished the 2015 season converting 13-17 (76%) field goals and 38-39 (97%) extra points for a career-high 77 total points.

== Professional career ==
=== Atlanta Falcons ===
After going undrafted in the 2016 NFL draft, on May 5, 2016, Rose signed with the Atlanta Falcons. On August 20, 2016, Rose was released by the Falcons.

=== San Francisco 49ers ===
Rose signed a reserve/future contract with the San Francisco 49ers on January 19, 2017. He was waived by the team on September 1, 2017.

=== Washington Redskins ===
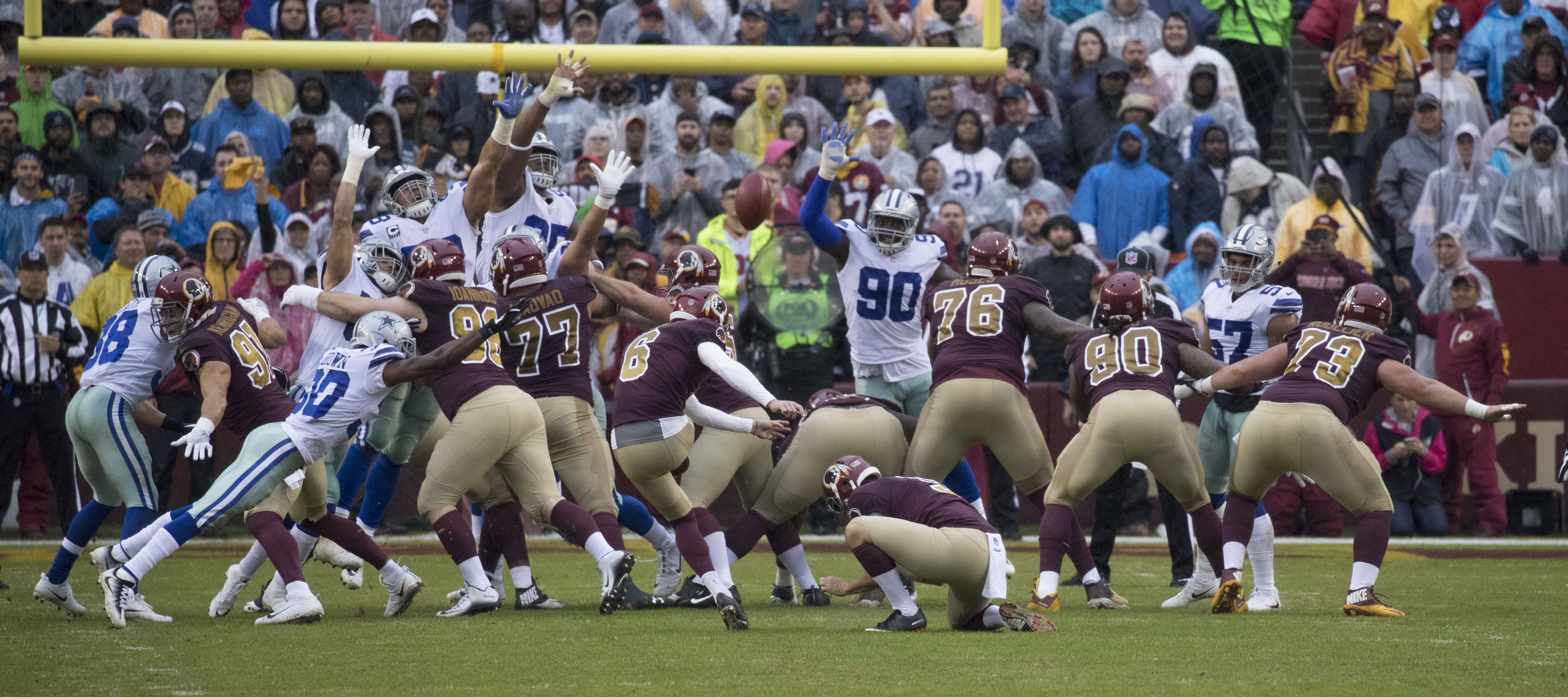
Rose kicks a field goal against the Dallas Cowboys

On October 18, 2017, Rose was signed by the Washington Redskins to replace an injured Dustin Hopkins. On October 23, he kicked his first field goal from 27 yards out against the Philadelphia Eagles. On November 12, he kicked a career-long 55-yard field goal against the Minnesota Vikings. On December 16, he was waived by the Redskins following the activation of Hopkins off injured reserve.

=== Los Angeles Chargers (first stint) ===
On December 18, 2017, Rose was claimed off waivers by the Los Angeles Chargers. He played two games for the Chargers in 2017. On April 13, 2018, he was waived by the Chargers.

=== New York Jets ===
On April 16, 2018, Rose was claimed off waivers by the New York Jets. He was waived by the Jets on May 14, 2018.

=== Houston Texans ===
On August 16, 2018, Rose was signed by the Houston Texans. He was waived on September 1, 2018.

=== Los Angeles Chargers (second stint) ===
On January 10, 2019, the Chargers signed Rose prior to their playoff game against the Patriots to handle kickoff duties and serve as a backup to kicker Michael Badgley. He was released on January 15, 2019.

=== San Antonio Commanders ===
On December 27, 2018, Rose signed with the San Antonio Commanders of the Alliance of American Football, but was eventually picked up by the Chargers. Following his release by Los Angeles, he returned to San Antonio on January 20, 2019. The league ceased operations in April 2019.

=== New Jersey Generals ===
On February 23, 2022, Rose was selected in the 2022 USFL draft by the New Jersey Generals in the 32nd round. This move reunited Rose with former San Antonio Commanders head coach Mike Riley. Rose played in his first game against the Birmingham Stallions in which he made all his PAT attempts but missed two out of his three field goal attempts in the 28–24 loss. He was placed on the inactive/did not report (DNR) list on May 10, 2022.
