= Jayrone Elliott =

American football player (born 1991)

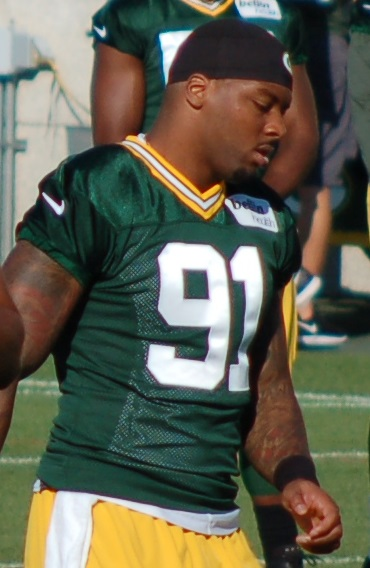
- Elliott with the Green Bay Packers in 2015

Profile
- Position: Linebacker

Personal information
- Born: November 11, 1991 (age 35); Cleveland, Ohio, U.S.
- Listed height: 6 ft 3 in (1.91 m)
- Listed weight: 240 lb (109 kg)

Career information
- High school: Glenville (Cleveland)
- College: Toledo (2010–2013)
- NFL draft: 2014: undrafted

Career history
- Green Bay Packers (2014–2016); Dallas Cowboys (2017); New Orleans Saints (2018)*; San Antonio Commanders (2019); Miami Dolphins (2019)*; Pittsburgh Steelers (2019–2020)
- * Offseason or practice squad member only

Awards and highlights
- First-team All-MAC (2013)

Career NFL statistics
- Games played: 52
- Total tackles: 69
- Sacks: 5.0
- Forced fumbles: 1
- Fumble recoveries: 1
- Interceptions: 1
- Stats at Pro Football Reference

Jayrone Carez Elliott (born November 11, 1991) is an American former professional football player who was a linebacker in the National Football League (NFL). He played college football at Toledo, and was signed by the Green Bay Packers as an undrafted free agent in 2014.

== College career ==
Elliott attended Glenville High School. He accepted a football scholarship from the University of Toledo. He became a starter at defensive end as a senior, registering 70 tackles (third on the team), 9 sacks (led the team), 14 tackles for loss (led the team) and 5 forced fumbles (led the team). He finished his career with 47 games (12 starts), 124 tackles (22½ for loss), 16 sacks, 6 forced fumbles and 4 passes defensed.

== Professional career ==
=== Green Bay Packers ===
After going undrafted in the 2014 NFL draft, Elliott signed with the Green Bay Packers on May 12, 2014. He was one of two undrafted players to make the Packers' opening day roster after posting 5 sacks in the preseason. Also had 1 sack his 1st year

Elliott earned an NBC game ball during the Packers' September 20, 2015, win against the Seahawks on Sunday Night Football. Elliott had one interception and forced a fumble that ended the Seahawks' last drive.

On March 14, 2017, Elliott signed a one-year contract extension with the Packers.

=== Dallas Cowboys ===
On September 3, 2017, the Dallas Cowboys acquired Elliott from the Packers in exchange for a 2018 conditional seventh-round pick (not exercised), to provide depth at linebacker while Anthony Hitchens recovered from a tibial plateau fracture in his right knee and Damien Wilson resolved legal pending issues and a probable suspension. On September 19, 2017, he was waived in order to activate defensive end Damontre Moore.

=== New Orleans Saints ===
On January 23, 2018, Elliott signed a reserve/future contract with the New Orleans Saints. He was released by the Saints on September 1.

=== San Antonio Commanders ===
In December 2018, Elliott signed with the San Antonio Commanders of the AAF. In the opening week, Elliot was credited with 3 tackles and half a sack. The following game, Elliot strip sacked Orlando quarterback Garrett Gilbert; Elliot's teammate, Joey Mbu who is also a former Green Bay Packer, recovered the ball for a San Antonio touchdown. By the time the AAF suspended operations, Elliot proved to be one of the league's best pass rushers by recording an all-time AAF record 7.5 sacks through 8 games, forcing 4 fumbles, and creating numerous quarterback pressures.

=== Miami Dolphins ===
After the AAF suspended football operations, Elliott signed with the Miami Dolphins on April 9, 2019. He was released by Miami on July 24.

=== Pittsburgh Steelers ===
Elliott signed with the Pittsburgh Steelers on August 22, 2019. He was released by Pittsburgh on August 31. Elliott was re-signed by the Steelers on September 10. However, he was released on October 11, and later re-signed by the team on October 23. Elliott was released on October 31 and re-signed on November 14. Elliott was waived again two days later.

Elliott re-signed with the Steelers once again on August 27, 2020. He was waived on September 5, and was re-signed to the practice squad the following day. Elliott was elevated to the active roster on October 24 and October 31 for the team's Weeks 7 and 8 games against the Tennessee Titans and Baltimore Ravens, and reverted to the practice squad after each game. He was promoted to the active roster on November 7.

== NFL career statistics ==
=== Regular season ===
Year	Team	G	GS	Tackles					Interceptions						Fumbles	
Year	Team	G	GS	Total	Solo	Ast	Sck	SFTY	PDef	Int	Yds	Avg	Lng	TDs	FF	FR
2014	GB	13	0	15	14	1	0.0	0	0	0	0	0.0	0	0	0	0
2015	GB	14	0	24	21	3	3.0	0	2	1	2	2.0	2	0	1	1
2016	GB	11	0	19	14	5	1.0	0	0	0	0	0.0	0	0	0	0
2017	DAL	1	0	0	0	0	0.0	0	0	0	0	0.0	0	0	0	0
2019	PIT	5	0	4	4	0	0.0	0	0	0	0	0.0	0	0	0	0
2020	PIT	8	0	7	5	2	1.0	0	0	0	0	0.0	0	0	0	0
Total		52	0	69	58	11	5.0	0	2	1	2	2.0	2	0	1	1
Source: PFR

=== Postseason ===
Year	Team	G	GS	Tackles					Interceptions						Fumbles	
Year	Team	G	GS	Total	Solo	Ast	Sck	SFTY	PDef	Int	Yds	Avg	Lng	TDs	FF	FR
2014	GB	2	0	3	3	0	0.0	0	0	0	0	0.0	0	0	0	0
2015	GB	1	0	0	0	0	0.0	0	0	0	0	0.0	0	0	0	0
2016	GB	1	0	0	0	0	0.0	0	0	0	0	0.0	0	0	0	0
Total		4	0	3	3	0	0.0	0	0	0	0	0.0	0	0	0	0
Source: PFR
