= 2020 XFL draft =

Inaugural player selection process of the XFL (2020)

General information
- Date(s): October 15–16, 2019
- Time: 10:00 AM ET
- Location: Conference call

Overview
- 560 total selections in 70 rounds
- League: XFL

The 2020 XFL draft was the inaugural player selection process to fill the rosters of the eight teams of the 2020 reboot of the XFL. The draft was held on October 15–16, 2019, via conference call, with results released through the XFL's social media channels.

== Structure ==
The XFL player allocation process was held in multiple phases, separated by position groups. The league used a "snake" format in each phase, in which the draft order reversed with each round. The draft order was shuffled for each phase as predetermined through lotteries. A draft pool of 1,000 eligible players was announced in 200-player installments the week before the draft. The first three phases took place on October 15, with the final two phases occurring on October 16. Teams were given 90 seconds to make each pick.

Each XFL team's manager-coach submitted a list of their preferred quarterbacks, with the league assigning one quarterback to each team prior to the draft as "tier 1" quarterbacks; if multiple teams requested the same player, the league resolved any disputes.

- Phase 1: offensive skill positions (other quarterbacks, running backs, wide receivers, and tight ends)—10 rounds
- Phase 2: offensive linemen (offensive tackles, guards, and centers)—10 rounds
- Phase 3: defensive front seven players (defensive linemen and linebackers)—10 rounds
- Phase 4: defensive backs (cornerbacks and safeties)—10 rounds
- Phase 5: open draft (any position)—30 rounds. Special teams players (including long snapper, punter, placekicker) have no separate position phase and are relegated to the open pool.

At the conclusion of the draft, each team had a 71-player preseason roster, to be cut down to 52 players by the start of the 2020 XFL season.

A supplemental draft was held November 22, 2019, with 66 additional players selected.

== Phase 0: Tier 1 quarterback allocations ==
Regular draft

XFL team	Player	Pos.	College	Notes
Dallas Renegades	Landry Jones	QB	Oklahoma	
DC Defenders	Cardale Jones	QB	Ohio State	
Houston Roughnecks	P. J. Walker	QB	Temple	
Los Angeles Wildcats	Luis Perez	QB	Texas A&M–Commerce	
New York Guardians	Matt McGloin	QB	Penn State	
Seattle Dragons	Brandon Silvers	QB	Troy	
St. Louis BattleHawks	Jordan Ta'amu	QB	Ole Miss	
Tampa Bay Vipers	Aaron Murray	QB	Georgia	

Supplemental draft

XFL team	Player	Pos.	College	Notes
Los Angeles Wildcats	Josh Johnson	QB	San Diego	
St. Louis BattleHawks	Taylor Heinicke	QB	Old Dominion	
Seattle Dragons	Chase Litton	QB	Marshall	

== Phase 1: Skill Players ==
Rnd.	Pick #	XFL team	Player	Pos.	College	Notes
1	1	DC Defenders	Rashard Davis	WR	James Madison	
1	2	Houston Roughnecks	Connor Cook	QB	Michigan State	
1	3	New York Guardians	DeAngelo Yancey	WR	Purdue	
1	4	Dallas Renegades	Jeff Badet	WR	Kentucky	
1	5	Tampa Bay Vipers	Nick Truesdell	TE	Grand Rapids CC	
1	6	St. Louis BattleHawks	Christine Michael	RB	Texas A&M	
1	7	Seattle Dragons	Trey Williams	RB	Texas A&M	
1	8	Los Angeles Wildcats	Elijah Hood	RB	North Carolina	
2	9	Los Angeles Wildcats	Rashad Ross	WR	Arizona State	
2	10	Seattle Dragons	Kenneth Farrow	RB	Houston	
2	11	St. Louis BattleHawks	Brogan Roback	QB	Eastern Michigan	
2	12	Tampa Bay Vipers	Seantavius Jones	WR	Valdosta State	
2	13	Dallas Renegades	Tommylee Lewis	WR	Northern Illinois	
2	14	New York Guardians	Mekale McKay	WR	Cincinnati	
2	15	Houston Roughnecks	Kahlil Lewis	WR	Cincinnati	
2	16	DC Defenders	Tre McBride	WR	William & Mary	
3	17	DC Defenders	Jhurell Pressley	RB	New Mexico	
3	18	Houston Roughnecks	Sammie Coates	WR	Auburn	
3	19	New York Guardians	Tanner Gentry	WR	Wyoming	
3	20	Dallas Renegades	Cameron Artis-Payne	RB	Auburn	
3	21	Tampa Bay Vipers	De'Veon Smith	RB	Michigan	
3	22	St. Louis BattleHawks	De'Mornay Pierson-El	WR	Nebraska	
3	23	Seattle Dragons	Fred Ross	WR	Mississippi State	
3	24	Los Angeles Wildcats	Nelson Spruce	WR	Colorado	
4	25	Los Angeles Wildcats	Brandon Barnes	TE	Alabama State	
4	26	Seattle Dragons	Jace Amaro	TE	Texas Tech	
4	27	St. Louis BattleHawks	L'Damian Washington	WR	Missouri	
4	28	Tampa Bay Vipers	Jalen Tolliver	WR	Arkansas–Monticello	
4	29	Dallas Renegades	Stacy Coley	WR	Miami (FL)	
4	30	New York Guardians	Tim Cook	RB	Oregon State	
4	31	Houston Roughnecks	Kyle Hicks	RB	TCU	
4	32	DC Defenders	DeAndre Thompkins	WR	Penn State	
5	33	DC Defenders	Khari Lee	TE	Bowie State	
5	34	Houston Roughnecks	Deontez Alexander	WR	Franklin (IN)	
5	35	New York Guardians	Demarcus Ayers	WR	Houston	
5	36	Dallas Renegades	Sean Price	TE	South Florida	
5	37	Tampa Bay Vipers	Quinton Flowers	RB	South Florida	
5	38	St. Louis BattleHawks	Wes Saxton	TE	South Alabama	
5	39	Seattle Dragons	Keenan Reynolds	WR	Navy	
5	40	Los Angeles Wildcats	Larry Rose III	RB	New Mexico State	
6	41	Los Angeles Wildcats	KD Cannon	WR	Baylor	
6	42	Seattle Dragons	Evan Rodriguez	TE	Temple	
6	43	St. Louis BattleHawks	Marcus Lucas	WR	Missouri	
6	44	Tampa Bay Vipers	Cole Wick	TE	Incarnate Word	
6	45	Dallas Renegades	Kelvin McKnight	WR	Samford	
6	46	New York Guardians	E. J. Bibbs	TE	Iowa State	
6	47	Houston Roughnecks	Cam Phillips	WR	Virginia Tech	
6	48	DC Defenders	Orson Charles	TE	Georgia	
7	49	DC Defenders	Donnel Pumphrey	RB	San Diego State	
7	50	Houston Roughnecks	Jalen Saunders	WR	Oklahoma	
7	51	New York Guardians	Keith Towbridge	TE	Louisville	
7	52	Dallas Renegades	Philip Nelson	QB	East Carolina	
7	53	Tampa Bay Vipers	Rannell Hall	WR	UCF	
7	54	St. Louis BattleHawks	Matt Jones	RB	Florida	
7	55	Seattle Dragons	Kasen Williams	WR	Washington	
7	56	Los Angeles Wildcats	Martez Carter	RB	Grambling State	
8	57	Los Angeles Wildcats	Keyarris Garrett	WR	Tulsa	
8	58	Seattle Dragons	John Santiago	WR	North Dakota	
8	59	St. Louis BattleHawks	Ishmael Hyman	WR	James Madison	
8	60	Tampa Bay Vipers	Reece Horn	WR	Indianapolis	
8	61	Dallas Renegades	Lance Dunbar	RB	North Texas	
8	62	New York Guardians	Justin Stockton	RB	Texas Tech	
8	63	Houston Roughnecks	Devin Gray	WR	Cincinnati	
8	64	DC Defenders	Max McCaffrey	WR	Duke	
9	65	DC Defenders	Tyree Jackson	QB	SUNY Buffalo	
9	66	Houston Roughnecks	Andre Williams	RB	Boston College	
9	67	New York Guardians	Darius Victor	RB	Towson	
9	68	Dallas Renegades	Donald Parham	TE	Stetson	
9	69	Tampa Bay Vipers	Taylor Cornelius	QB	Oklahoma State	
9	70	St. Louis BattleHawks	Alonzo Russell	WR	Toledo	
9	71	Seattle Dragons	Cam Clear	TE	Texas A&M	
9	72	Los Angeles Wildcats	Scott Orndoff	TE	Pitt	
10	73	Los Angeles Wildcats	Donteea Dye	WR	Heidelberg	
10	74	Seattle Dragons	Malachi Jones	WR	Appalachian State	
10	75	St. Louis BattleHawks	Jordan Lasley	WR	UCLA	
10	76	Tampa Bay Vipers	Alonzo Moore	WR	Nebraska	
10	77	Dallas Renegades	Dimitri Flowers	RB	Oklahoma	
10	78	New York Guardians	Marquise Williams	QB	North Carolina	
10	79	Houston Roughnecks	Nick Holley	RB	Kent State	
10	80	DC Defenders	Adrien Robinson	TE	Cincinnati	

== Phase 2: Offensive line ==
Rnd.	Pick #	XFL team	Player	Pos.	College	Notes
1	1	Los Angeles Wildcats	Storm Norton	OT	Toledo	
1	2	Seattle Dragons	Isaiah Battle	OT	Clemson	
1	3	St. Louis BattleHawks	Matt McCants	OT	UAB	
1	4	Tampa Bay Vipers	Jordan McCray	C	UCF	
1	5	Dallas Renegades	Willie Beavers	OT	Western Michigan	
1	6	New York Guardians	Jarron Jones	OT	Notre Dame	
1	7	Houston Roughnecks	Cornelius Edison	OT	Portland State	
1	8	DC Defenders	Kyle Murphy	OT	Stanford	
2	9	DC Defenders	Logan Tuley-Tillman	OT	Michigan	
2	10	Houston Roughnecks	Terry Poole	OT	San Diego State	
2	11	New York Guardians	Cyrus Kouandjio	OT	Alabama	
2	12	Dallas Renegades	Pace Murphy	OT	Northwestern State	
2	13	Tampa Bay Vipers	Martez Ivey	OT	Florida	
2	14	St. Louis BattleHawks	Brian Folkerts	OG	Washburn	
2	15	Seattle Dragons	Venzell Boulware	OG	Tennessee	
2	16	Los Angeles Wildcats	Fred Lauina	OG	Oregon State	
3	17	Los Angeles Wildcats	Ryan Pope	OT	San Diego State	
3	18	Seattle Dragons	Dillon Day	OT	Mississippi State	
3	19	St. Louis BattleHawks	Dallas Thomas	OG	Tennessee	
3	20	Tampa Bay Vipers	Isaiah Williams	OG	Akron	
3	21	Dallas Renegades	Maurquice Shakir	OG	Middle Tennessee State	
3	22	New York Guardians	Parker Collins	C	Appalachian State	
3	23	Houston Roughnecks	Avery Gennesy	OT	Texas A&M	
3	24	DC Defenders	De'Ondre Wesley	OT	BYU	
4	25	DC Defenders	Jon Toth	C	Kentucky	
4	26	Houston Roughnecks	Demetrius Rhaney	C	Tennessee State	
4	27	New York Guardians	Anthony Coyle	OG	Fordham	
4	28	Dallas Renegades	Darius James	OT	Auburn	
4	29	Tampa Bay Vipers	Andrew Tiller	OG	Syracuse	
4	30	St. Louis BattleHawks	Kent Perkins	OT	Texas	
4	31	Seattle Dragons	Cyril Richardson	OG	Baylor	
4	32	Los Angeles Wildcats	Jaelin Robinson	OT	Temple	
5	33	Los Angeles Wildcats	Damien Mama	OG	USC	
5	34	Seattle Dragons	Quinterrius Eatmon	OT	South Florida	
5	35	St. Louis BattleHawks	Jake Campos	OG	Iowa State	
5	36	Tampa Bay Vipers	Tre' Jackson	C	Florida State	
5	37	Dallas Renegades	Alex Balducci	C	Oregon	
5	38	New York Guardians	Zac Kerin	OG	Toledo	
5	39	Houston Roughnecks	Marquez Tucker	OG	Southern Utah	
5	40	DC Defenders	Rishard Cook	OG	UAB	
6	41	DC Defenders	Chris Brown	OG	USC	
6	42	Houston Roughnecks	Gerhard de Beer	OT	Arizona	
6	43	New York Guardians	Brian Fineanganofo	OT	Idaho State	
6	44	Dallas Renegades	Josh Allen	OG	Louisiana–Monroe	
6	45	Tampa Bay Vipers	Christian Morris	OT	Ole Miss	
6	46	St. Louis BattleHawks	Tyler Gauthier	C	Miami	
6	47	Seattle Dragons	Michael Dunn	OT	Maryland	
6	48	Los Angeles Wildcats	Nico Siragusa	OG	San Diego State	
7	49	Los Angeles Wildcats	Ryan Cummings	OT	Wyoming	
7	50	Seattle Dragons	Kirk Barron	C	Purdue	
7	51	St. Louis BattleHawks	Blake Muir	OG	Baylor	
7	52	Tampa Bay Vipers	Tony Adams	OG	North Carolina State	
7	53	Dallas Renegades	Adam Bisnowaty	OT	Pitt	
7	54	New York Guardians	John Kling	OT	SUNY Buffalo	
7	55	Houston Roughnecks	Patrick Lewis	C	Texas A&M	
7	56	DC Defenders	Toby Weathersby	OT	LSU	
8	57	DC Defenders	James O'Hagan	C	SUNY Buffalo	
8	58	Houston Roughnecks	Ryan Anderson	C	Wake Forest	
8	59	New York Guardians	Ian Silberman	OT	Boston College	
8	60	Dallas Renegades	Salesi Uhatafe	OG	Utah	
8	61	Tampa Bay Vipers	Daronte Bouldin	OG	Ole Miss	
8	62	St. Louis BattleHawks	James Murray	C	Holy Cross	
8	63	Seattle Dragons	Jordan Rose	OT	Idaho	
8	64	Los Angeles Wildcats	Lene Maiava	OT	Arizona	
9	65	Los Angeles Wildcats	Tyler Roemer	OT	San Diego State	
9	66	Seattle Dragons	Robert Myers	OG	Tennessee State	
9	67	St. Louis BattleHawks	Juwann Bushell-Beatty	OG	Michigan	
9	68	Tampa Bay Vipers	Marquis Lucas	OG	West Virginia	
9	69	Dallas Renegades	John Keenoy	C	Western Michigan	
9	70	New York Guardians	Nate Theaker	OG	Wayne State	
9	71	Houston Roughnecks	Marcus Applefield	OT	Virginia	
9	72	DC Defenders	Chase Farris	OG	Ohio State	
10	73	DC Defenders	Casey Tucker	OT	Arizona State	
10	74	Houston Roughnecks	Tayo Fabuluje	OG	TCU	
10	75	New York Guardians	Arie Kouandjio	OG	Alabama	
10	76	Dallas Renegades	Justin Evans	OT	South Carolina State	
10	77	Tampa Bay Vipers	William Campbell	OG	Michigan	
10	78	St. Louis BattleHawks	Dejon Allen	OG	Hawaii	
10	79	Seattle Dragons	Craig McCorkle	OT	California (PA)	
10	80	Los Angeles Wildcats	Anthony Morris	OT	Tennessee State	

== Phase 3: Defensive front seven ==
Rnd.	Pick #	XFL team	Player	Pos.	College	Notes
1	1	Tampa Bay Vipers	Obum Gwacham	DE	Oregon State	
1	2	St. Louis BattleHawks	Casey Sayles	DT	Ohio	
1	3	Seattle Dragons	Stansly Maponga	DE	TCU	
1	4	Los Angeles Wildcats	Anthony Johnson	DT	LSU	
1	5	DC Defenders	James Vaughters	LB	Stanford	
1	6	Houston Roughnecks	Trenton Thompson	DT	Georgia	
1	7	New York Guardians	Ben Heeney	LB	Kansas	
1	8	Dallas Renegades	Hau'oli Kikaha	DE	Washington	
2	9	Dallas Renegades	Sealver Siliga	DT	Utah	
2	10	New York Guardians	Joey Mbu	DT	Houston	
2	11	Houston Roughnecks	Corey Crawford	DE	Clemson	
2	12	DC Defenders	Charles Harris	DE	SUNY Buffalo	
2	13	Los Angeles Wildcats	Eric Pinkins	LB	San Diego State	
2	14	Seattle Dragons	Nick Temple	LB	Cincinnati	
2	15	St. Louis BattleHawks	Terence Garvin	LB	West Virginia	
2	16	Tampa Bay Vipers	Deiontrez Mount	DE	Louisville	
3	17	Tampa Bay Vipers	Ricky Walker	DT	Virginia Tech	
3	18	St. Louis BattleHawks	Andrew Ankrah	DE	James Madison	
3	19	Seattle Dragons	Will Sutton	DT	Arizona State	
3	20	Los Angeles Wildcats	Latarius Brady	DT	Memphis	
3	21	DC Defenders	Elijah Qualls	DT	Washington	
3	22	Houston Roughnecks	Edmond Robinson	LB	Newberry	
3	23	New York Guardians	Austin Larkin	DE	Purdue	
3	24	Dallas Renegades	Winston Craig	DT	Richmond	
4	25	Dallas Renegades	Raymond Davison	LB	California	
4	26	New York Guardians	TJ Barnes	DT	Georgia Tech	
4	27	Houston Roughnecks	Davis Tull	LB	UT Chattanooga	
4	28	DC Defenders	Scooby Wright	LB	Arizona	
4	29	Los Angeles Wildcats	Willie Mays	DE	Tiffin	
4	30	Seattle Dragons	Tenny Palepoi	DE	Utah	
4	31	St. Louis BattleHawks	Jamell Garcia-Williams	DE	UAB	
4	32	Tampa Bay Vipers	Reggie Northrup	LB	Florida State	
5	33	Tampa Bay Vipers	Josh Banks	DT	Wake Forest	
5	34	St. Louis BattleHawks	Channing Ward	DT	Ole Miss	
5	35	Seattle Dragons	Jacquies Smith	DE	Missouri	
5	36	Los Angeles Wildcats	Tre' Williams	LB	Auburn	
5	37	DC Defenders	Tracy Sprinkle	DT	Ohio State	
5	38	Houston Roughnecks	Olive Sagapolu	DT	Wisconsin	
5	39	New York Guardians	Nick DeLuca	LB	North Dakota State	
5	40	Dallas Renegades	Greer Martini	LB	Notre Dame	
6	41	Dallas Renegades	Gelen Robinson	DT	Purdue	
6	42	New York Guardians	D'Juan Hines	LB	Houston	
6	43	Houston Roughnecks	Beniquez Brown	LB	Mississippi State	
6	44	DC Defenders	Jameer Thurman	LB	Indiana State	
6	45	Los Angeles Wildcats	Leon Orr	DT	Florida	
6	46	Seattle Dragons	Steven Johnson	LB	Kansas	
6	47	St. Louis BattleHawks	Khyri Thornton	DT	Southern Miss	
6	48	Tampa Bay Vipers	Emmanuel Beal	LB	Oklahoma	
7	49	Tampa Bay Vipers	Lucas Wacha	LB	Wyoming	
7	50	St. Louis BattleHawks	Gimel President	DE	Illinois	
7	51	Seattle Dragons	Taniela Tupou	DT	Washington	
7	52	Los Angeles Wildcats	Reggie Howard	DT	Toledo	
7	53	DC Defenders	Sam Montgomery	DE	LSU	
7	54	Houston Roughnecks	Andrew Jackson	LB	Western Kentucky	
7	55	New York Guardians	Jarrell Owens	DE	Oklahoma State	
7	56	Dallas Renegades	Frank Alexander	DE	Oklahoma	
8	57	Dallas Renegades	Jonathan Massaquoi	LB	Troy	
8	58	New York Guardians	Cavon Walker	DT	Maryland	
8	59	Houston Roughnecks	DeMarquis Gates	LB	Ole Miss	
8	60	DC Defenders	Jonathan Celestin	LB	Minnesota	
8	61	Los Angeles Wildcats	Corey Vereen	DE	Tennessee	
8	62	Seattle Dragons	Danny Ezechukwu	DE	Purdue	
8	63	St. Louis BattleHawks	Marcus Hardison	DT	Arizona State	
8	64	Tampa Bay Vipers	Anthony Stubbs	LB	Prairie View A&M	
9	65	Tampa Bay Vipers	Jason Neill	DE	UTSA	
9	66	St. Louis BattleHawks	Nicholas Grigsby	LB	Pitt	
9	67	Seattle Dragons	Pasoni Tasini	DT	Utah	
9	68	Los Angeles Wildcats	Adrian Hubbard	DE	Alabama	
9	69	DC Defenders	KeShun Freeman	DE	Georgia Tech	
9	70	Houston Roughnecks	Caushaud Lyons	DT	Tusculum	
9	71	New York Guardians	Garrison Smith	DT	Georgia	
9	72	Dallas Renegades	Tegray Scales	LB	Indiana	
10	73	Dallas Renegades	Izaah Lunsford	DT	Bowling Green	
10	74	New York Guardians	Rykeem Yates	DE	Nevada	
10	75	Houston Roughnecks	Drew Lewis	LB	Colorado	
10	76	DC Defenders	Daryle Banfield	DT	Brown	
10	77	Los Angeles Wildcats	Owen Roberts	DT	San Jose State	
10	78	Seattle Dragons	Praise Martin-Oguike	DE	Temple	
10	79	St. Louis BattleHawks	Corbin Kaufusi	DE	BYU	
10	80	Tampa Bay Vipers	Devin Taylor	DE	South Carolina	

== Phase 4: Defensive backs ==
Rnd.	Pick #	XFL team	Player	Pos.	College	Notes
1	1	Dallas Renegades	Derron Smith	S	Fresno State	
1	2	New York Guardians	Jamar Summers	CB	Connecticut	
1	3	Houston Roughnecks	Deji Olatoye	CB	North Carolina A&T	
1	4	DC Defenders	Elijah Campbell	CB	Northern Iowa	
1	5	Los Angeles Wildcats	Jack Tocho	CB	North Carolina State	
1	6	Seattle Dragons	Jhavonte Dean	CB	Miami (FL)	
1	7	St. Louis BattleHawks	Herb Miller	S	Florida Atlantic	
1	8	Tampa Bay Vipers	Arrion Springs	CB	Oregon	
2	9	Tampa Bay Vipers	Picasso Jr. Nelson	CB	Southern Miss	
2	10	St. Louis BattleHawks	Will Hill	S	Florida	
2	11	Seattle Dragons	Chris Davis	CB	Auburn	
2	12	Los Angeles Wildcats	Jaylen Dunlap	CB	Illinois	
2	13	DC Defenders	Desmond Lawrence	CB	North Carolina	
2	14	Houston Roughnecks	Robert Nelson	CB	Arizona State	
2	15	New York Guardians	Lorenzo Doss	CB	Tulane	
2	16	Dallas Renegades	Treston Decoud	CB	Oregon State	
3	17	Dallas Renegades	Dashaun Phillips	CB	Tarleton State	
3	18	New York Guardians	David Rivers	CB	Youngstown State	
3	19	Houston Roughnecks	Trae Elston	S	Ole Miss	
3	20	DC Defenders	Jalen Myrick	CB	Minnesota	
3	21	Los Angeles Wildcats	C. J. Moore	CB	North Carolina Central	
3	22	Seattle Dragons	Kentrell Brice	S	Louisiana Tech	
3	23	St. Louis BattleHawks	D'Montre Wade	CB	Murray State	
3	24	Tampa Bay Vipers	Demontre Hurst	CB	Oklahoma	
4	25	Tampa Bay Vipers	Jude Adjei-Barimah	CB	Bowling Green	
4	26	St. Louis BattleHawks	Dexter McCoil	S	Toledo	
4	27	Seattle Dragons	Steve Williams	CB	California	
4	28	Los Angeles Wildcats	Roman Tatum	CB	Southern Illinois	
4	29	DC Defenders	Doran Grant	CB	Ohio State	
4	30	Houston Roughnecks	Marqueston Huff	S	Wyoming	
4	31	New York Guardians	Dravon Askew-Henry	S	West Virginia	
4	32	Dallas Renegades	Kurtis Drummond	S	Michigan State	
5	33	Dallas Renegades	Josh Hawkins	CB	East Carolina	
5	34	New York Guardians	Demetrious Cox	S	Michigan State	
5	35	Houston Roughnecks	SaQwan Edwards	S	New Mexico	
5	36	DC Defenders	Bradley Sylve	CB	Alabama	
5	37	Los Angeles Wildcats	Jordan Powell	S	Widener	
5	38	Seattle Dragons	Channing Stribling	CB	Michigan	
5	39	St. Louis BattleHawks	Kenny Robinson	S	West Virginia	
5	40	Tampa Bay Vipers	Marcelis Branch	S	Robert Morris (PA)	
6	41	Tampa Bay Vipers	Micah Hannemann	S	BYU	
6	42	St. Louis BattleHawks	Marquez White	CB	Florida State	
6	43	Seattle Dragons	Cody Brown	S	Arkansas State	
6	44	Los Angeles Wildcats	Ahmad Dixon	S	Baylor	
6	45	DC Defenders	Reggie Cole	CB	Mary Hardin–Baylor	
6	46	Houston Roughnecks	Ed Reynolds	S	Stanford	
6	47	New York Guardians	Andrew Soroh	S	Florida Atlantic	
6	48	Dallas Renegades	Montrel Meander	S	Grambling State	
7	49	Dallas Renegades	John Franklin III	CB	Auburn	
7	50	New York Guardians	Jeremiah McKinnon	CB	Florida Atlantic	
7	51	Houston Roughnecks	Brendan Langley	CB	Lamar	
7	52	DC Defenders	Rahim Moore	S	UCLA	
7	53	Los Angeles Wildcats	Harlan Miller	CB	Southeastern Louisiana	
7	54	Seattle Dragons	Jordan Martin	S	Syracuse	
7	55	St. Louis BattleHawks	Trovon Reed	CB	Auburn	
7	56	Tampa Bay Vipers	Lashard Durr	CB	Mississippi State	
8	57	Tampa Bay Vipers	Herb Waters	CB	Miami	
8	58	St. Louis BattleHawks	Joe Powell	S	Globe Institute of Technology	
8	59	Seattle Dragons	Tyson Graham	S	South Dakota	
8	60	Los Angeles Wildcats	Jerome Couplin	S	William & Mary	
8	61	DC Defenders	Tyree Kinnel	S	Michigan	
8	62	Houston Roughnecks	Kendall Adams	S	Kansas State	
8	63	New York Guardians	Terrence Alexander	CB	LSU	
8	64	Dallas Renegades	Doyin Jibowu	S	Fort Hays State	
9	65	Dallas Renegades	Donatello Brown	CB	Valdosta State	
9	66	New York Guardians	Nydair Rouse	CB	West Chester	
9	67	Houston Roughnecks	Deatrick Nichols	CB	South Florida	
9	68	DC Defenders	Carlos Merritt	S	Campbell	
9	69	Los Angeles Wildcats	Mike Stevens	CB	North Carolina State	
9	70	Seattle Dragons	Mohammed Seisay	CB	Nebraska	
9	71	St. Louis BattleHawks	Trey Caldwell	CB	Louisiana–Monroe	
9	72	Tampa Bay Vipers	Robenson Therezie	S	Auburn	
10	73	Tampa Bay Vipers	Bryce Canady	CB	FIU	
10	74	St. Louis BattleHawks	Ryan White	CB	Auburn	
10	75	Seattle Dragons	Sterling Moore	CB	SMU	
10	76	Los Angeles Wildcats	Bryce Cheek	CB	Akron	
10	77	DC Defenders	Ladarius Gunter	CB	Miami (FL)	
10	78	Houston Roughnecks	Justin Martin	CB	Tennessee	
10	79	New York Guardians	Ranthony Texada	CB	TCU	
10	80	Dallas Renegades	Ronald Martin	S	LSU	

== Phase 5: Open draft ==
The open draft phase consisted of 30 rounds, but the XFL only released the results sorted by team and position without draft positions.

XFL team	Player	Pos.	College	Notes
Dallas Renegades	Darnell Holland	RB	Kennesaw State	
Dallas Renegades	Marquis Young	RB	UMass	
Dallas Renegades	Ryan Broyles	WR	Oklahoma	
Dallas Renegades	Joshua Crockett	WR	Central Oklahoma	
Dallas Renegades	Steven Dunbar	WR	Houston	
Dallas Renegades	Jerrod Heard	WR	Texas	
Dallas Renegades	Keith Mumphery	WR	Michigan State	
Dallas Renegades	Flynn Nagel	WR	Northwestern	
Dallas Renegades	Carl Whitley	WR	Abilene Christian	
Dallas Renegades	Romello Brooker	TE	Houston	
Dallas Renegades	Patrick Lawrence	OT	Baylor	
Dallas Renegades	Oni Omoile	OG	Iowa State	
Dallas Renegades	Maea Teuhema	OG	Southeastern Louisiana	
Dallas Renegades	Johnathan Calvin	DE	Mississippi State	
Dallas Renegades	James Folston	DE	Pittsburgh	
Dallas Renegades	Gerald Rivers	DE	Ole Miss	
Dallas Renegades	Tony Guerad	DT	UCF	
Dallas Renegades	Nick James	DT	Mississippi State	
Dallas Renegades	Ray Smith	DT	Boston College	
Dallas Renegades	Tyrell Thompson	DT	Tarleton State	
Dallas Renegades	Asantay Brown	LB	Western Michigan	
Dallas Renegades	Reshard Cliett	LB	South Florida	
Dallas Renegades	Marquis Flowers	LB	Arizona	
Dallas Renegades	Tre Watson	LB	Maryland	
Dallas Renegades	Tenny Adewusi	CB	Delaware	
Dallas Renegades	C. J. Smith	CB	North Dakota State	
Dallas Renegades	Jalen Harvey	S	Arizona State	
Dallas Renegades	Austin MacGinnis	K	Kentucky	
Dallas Renegades	Drew Galitz	P	Baylor	
Dallas Renegades	Colin Holba	LS	Louisville	
DC Defenders	Khalid Abdullah	RB	James Madison	
DC Defenders	John Thomas	RB	Penn State	
DC Defenders	Ryan Yurachek	RB	Marshall	
DC Defenders	Jamal Custis	WR	Syracuse	
DC Defenders	Deion Holliman	WR	Missouri	
DC Defenders	Levern Jacobs	WR	Maryland	
DC Defenders	Terrence Lee-Alls	WR	James Madison	
DC Defenders	Richard Mullaney	WR	Alabama	
DC Defenders	Jaylen Smith	WR	Louisville	
DC Defenders	Justin Thomas	WR	Georgia Tech	
DC Defenders	Dimitrios Tsesmetzis	TE	Western Connecticut State	
DC Defenders	Cole Boozer	OT	Temple	
DC Defenders	Randall Harris	OT	Towson	
DC Defenders	Trae Moxley	OT	Colorado State	
DC Defenders	Terron Prescod	OG	NC State	
DC Defenders	Ronald Patrick	C	South Carolina	
DC Defenders	Tavaris Barnes	DE	Clemson	
DC Defenders	Jake Ceresna	DE	Cortland	
DC Defenders	Brian Khoury	DE	Carnegie Mellon	
DC Defenders	Siupeli Anau	DT	Northern Arizona	
DC Defenders	Josh Augusta	DT	Missouri	
DC Defenders	DuVonta Lampkin	DT	Oklahoma	
DC Defenders	Kristjan Sokoli	DT	Buffalo	
DC Defenders	Koa Farmer	LB	Penn State	
DC Defenders	Jordan Jones	LB	Kentucky	
DC Defenders	A. J. Tarpley	LB	Stanford	
DC Defenders	Matt Elam	S	Florida	
DC Defenders	Max Redfield	S	IUP	
DC Defenders	Tre Sullivan	S	Shepherd	
DC Defenders	Hunter Niswander	P	Northwestern	
Houston Roughnecks	Akrum Wadley	RB	Iowa	
Houston Roughnecks	Marquez Williams	RB	Miami (FL)	
Houston Roughnecks	Raymond Bolden	WR	Stony Brook	
Houston Roughnecks	Joe Horn Jr.	WR	Missouri Western State	
Houston Roughnecks	Blake Jackson	WR	Mary Hardin–Baylor	
Houston Roughnecks	Ryheem Malone	WR	Louisiana	
Houston Roughnecks	Sam Mobley	WR	Catawba	
Houston Roughnecks	Tim Wilson	WR	East Stroudsburg	
Houston Roughnecks	Isame Faciane	OG	FIU	
Houston Roughnecks	Nick Callender	OT	Colorado State	
Houston Roughnecks	Leon Johnson	OT	Temple	
Houston Roughnecks	Avery Jordan	OT	New Mexico	
Houston Roughnecks	Kamalie Matthews	OT	Murray State	
Houston Roughnecks	Kelvin Palmer	OT	Baylor	
Houston Roughnecks	Walter Palmore	DT	Missouri	
Houston Roughnecks	Handsome Tanielu	DT	BYU	
Houston Roughnecks	Kony Ealy	DE	Missouri	
Houston Roughnecks	Johnny Maxey	DE	Mars Hill	
Houston Roughnecks	Aaron Tiller	DE	Southern	
Houston Roughnecks	Taylor Reed	DE	SMU	
Houston Roughnecks	Carl Bradford	LB	Arizona State	
Houston Roughnecks	Kaelin Burnett	LB	Nevada	
Houston Roughnecks	Johnny Ragin	LB	Oregon	
Houston Roughnecks	Ty Schwab	LB	Boston College	
Houston Roughnecks	Jeremiah Johnson	CB	Concord	
Houston Roughnecks	David Simmons	CB	North Park	
Houston Roughnecks	K. J. Dillon	S	West Virginia	
Houston Roughnecks	Fred Payne	S	Western Carolina	
Houston Roughnecks	Austin Rehkow	P	Idaho	
Houston Roughnecks	Colton Taylor	LS	Virginia Tech	
Los Angeles Wildcats	Jalan McClendon	QB	Baylor	
Los Angeles Wildcats	Taryn Christion	QB	South Dakota State	
Los Angeles Wildcats	Nico Evans	RB	Wyoming	
Los Angeles Wildcats	Winston Dimel	RB	UTEP	
Los Angeles Wildcats	Adonis Jennings	WR	Temple	
Los Angeles Wildcats	DeQuan Hampton	WR	USC	
Los Angeles Wildcats	Jalen Greene	WR	Utah State	
Los Angeles Wildcats	Kermit Whitfield	WR	Florida State	
Los Angeles Wildcats	Cordon Moog	TE	Baylor	
Los Angeles Wildcats	Johnny Stanton	TE	UNLV	
Los Angeles Wildcats	Damian Prince	OT	Maryland	
Los Angeles Wildcats	Micah St. Andrew	OG	Fresno State	
Los Angeles Wildcats	Patrick Vahe	OG	Texas	
Los Angeles Wildcats	Cedric Reed	DE	Texas	
Los Angeles Wildcats	Dame Ndiaye	DE	Portland State	
Los Angeles Wildcats	Shawn Oakman	DE	Baylor	
Los Angeles Wildcats	Andrew Stelter	DT	Minnesota	
Los Angeles Wildcats	Andrew Williams	DT	Auburn	
Los Angeles Wildcats	Alex Funches	LB	California	
Los Angeles Wildcats	Jerimiah Spicer	LB	Bethesda	
Los Angeles Wildcats	Quentin Gause	LB	Rutgers	
Los Angeles Wildcats	Taiwan Jones	LB	Michigan State	
Los Angeles Wildcats	Joshua Jenkins	CB	Army	
Los Angeles Wildcats	Tyree Holder	CB	Ball State	
Los Angeles Wildcats	Jaleel Wadood	S	UCLA	
Los Angeles Wildcats	LaDarius Wiley	S	Vanderbilt	
Los Angeles Wildcats	Mar’Sean Diggs	S	UAB	
Los Angeles Wildcats	Nick Novak	K	Maryland	
Los Angeles Wildcats	Colton Schmidt	P	UC Davis	
Los Angeles Wildcats	Ryan Navarro	LS	Oregon State	
New York Guardians	Garrett Fugate	QB	Central Missouri	
New York Guardians	Lawrence Pittman	RB	Wingate	
New York Guardians	Matthew Colburn	RB	Wake Forest	
New York Guardians	Tommy Bohanon	RB	Wake Forest	
New York Guardians	Colby Pearson	WR	BYU	
New York Guardians	J-Shun Harris	WR	Indiana	
New York Guardians	Justice Liggins	WR	Stephen F. Austin	
New York Guardians	Keevan Lucas	WR	Tulsa	
New York Guardians	Octayvius Miles	WR	Alabama A&M	
New York Guardians	Quadree Henderson	WR	Pittsburgh	
New York Guardians	Jake Powell	TE	Monmouth	
New York Guardians	Jake Sutherland	TE	Morehead State	
New York Guardians	Adrian Bellard	OT	Louisiana-Lafayette	
New York Guardians	Thomas Doles	OT	Northwestern	
New York Guardians	Garrett Brumfield	C	LSU	
New York Guardians	George Johnson	DE	Rutgers	
New York Guardians	Malik Harris	DE	Incarnate Word	
New York Guardians	Ryan Mueller	DE	Kansas State	
New York Guardians	Victor Ochi	DE	Stony Brook	
New York Guardians	Bunmi Rotimi	DT	Old Dominion	
New York Guardians	Toby Johnson	DT	Georgia	
New York Guardians	Darnell Leslie	LB	Monmouth	
New York Guardians	Frank Ginda	LB	San Jose State	
New York Guardians	Jawuan Johnson	LB	TCU	
New York Guardians	Robert McCray	LB	Indiana	
New York Guardians	DeJuan Neal	CB	Shepherd	
New York Guardians	Aaron Taylor	S	Ball State	
New York Guardians	Max Lyons	S	Southeastern Louisiana	
New York Guardians	Wesley Sutton	S	Northern Arizona	
New York Guardians	Scott Daly	LS	Notre Dame	
Seattle Dragons	B. J. Daniels	QB	South Florida	
Seattle Dragons	Joe Callahan	QB	Wesley	
Seattle Dragons	Ja'Quan Gardner	RB	Humboldt State	
Seattle Dragons	Lavon Coleman	RB	Washington	
Seattle Dragons	Austin Proehl	WR	North Carolina	
Seattle Dragons	Jalen Rowell	WR	Air Force	
Seattle Dragons	Korey Robertson	WR	Southern Miss	
Seattle Dragons	Mikah Holder	WR	San Diego State	
Seattle Dragons	Reuben Mwehla	WR	Idaho	
Seattle Dragons	Ben Johnson	TE	Kansas	
Seattle Dragons	Colin Jeter	TE	LSU	
Seattle Dragons	Connor Hamlett	TE	Oregon State	
Seattle Dragons	Brandon Haskin	OT	Tennessee State	
Seattle Dragons	Naty Rodgers	OT	Houston	
Seattle Dragons	Durrant Miles	DE	Boise State	
Seattle Dragons	Marcell Frazier	DE	Missouri	
Seattle Dragons	Martin Ifedi	DE	Memphis	
Seattle Dragons	Anthony Johnson	DT	FIU	
Seattle Dragons	Jeremy Liggins	DT	Ole Miss	
Seattle Dragons	Jordan Thompson	DT	Northwestern	
Seattle Dragons	Shane Bowman	DT	Washington	
Seattle Dragons	Dante Booker	LB	Ohio State	
Seattle Dragons	Gionni Paul	LB	Utah	
Seattle Dragons	Kyle Queiro	LB	Northwestern	
Seattle Dragons	Nyles Morgan	LB	Notre Dame	
Seattle Dragons	Jermaine Ponder	CB	Saint Francis	
Seattle Dragons	Santos Ramirez	S	Arkansas	
Seattle Dragons	Greg Joseph	K	Florida Atlantic	
Seattle Dragons	Brock Miller	P	Southern Utah	
Seattle Dragons	Noah Borden	LS	Hawaii	
St. Louis BattleHawks	Lenard Tillery	RB	Southern	
St. Louis BattleHawks	Ray Lawry	RB	Old Dominion	
St. Louis BattleHawks	Sherman Badie	RB	Tulane	
St. Louis BattleHawks	Brandon Reilly	WR	Nebraska	
St. Louis BattleHawks	Carlton Agudosi	WR	Rutgers	
St. Louis BattleHawks	Damoun Patterson	WR	Youngstown State	
St. Louis BattleHawks	Davon Grayson	WR	East Carolina	
St. Louis BattleHawks	DeVozea Felton	WR	Tuskegee	
St. Louis BattleHawks	Cole Hunt	TE	TCU	
St. Louis BattleHawks	Connor Davis	TE	Stony Brook	
St. Louis BattleHawks	Andrew McDonald	OT	Indiana	
St. Louis BattleHawks	Bruno Reagan	OT	Vanderbilt	
St. Louis BattleHawks	Avery Young	OG	Auburn	
St. Louis BattleHawks	Korren Kirven	OG	Alabama	
St. Louis BattleHawks	Michael Miller	OG	Washburn	
St. Louis BattleHawks	Farrington Hugenin	DE	Kentucky	
St. Louis BattleHawks	Markus Jones	DE	Angelo State	
St. Louis BattleHawks	Shaq Jones	DE	UAB	
St. Louis BattleHawks	Ulric Jones	DE	South Carolina	
St. Louis BattleHawks	DaVonte Lambert	DT	Auburn	
St. Louis BattleHawks	Jake Payne	DT	Shenandoah	
St. Louis BattleHawks	Kellen Soulek	DT	South Dakota State	
St. Louis BattleHawks	Garret Dooley	LB	Wisconsin	
St. Louis BattleHawks	Ro'Derrick Hoskins	LB	Florida State	
St. Louis BattleHawks	Steve Beauharnais	LB	Rutgers	
St. Louis BattleHawks	Charles James	CB	Charleston Southern	
St. Louis BattleHawks	Clifton Duck	CB	Appalachian State	
St. Louis BattleHawks	Elliott Fry	K	South Carolina	
St. Louis BattleHawks	Jack Fox	P	Rice	
St. Louis BattleHawks	John Wirtel	LS	Kansas	
Tampa Bay Vipers	Vincent Testaverde Jr.	QB	Albany	
Tampa Bay Vipers	D.J. May	RB	Wyoming	
Tampa Bay Vipers	Jacques Patrick	RB	Florida State	
Tampa Bay Vipers	Ralph Webb	RB	Vanderbilt	
Tampa Bay Vipers	Chris Thompson	WR	Florida	
Tampa Bay Vipers	Daniel Williams	WR	Jackson State	
Tampa Bay Vipers	Freddie Martino	WR	North Greenville	
Tampa Bay Vipers	K. J. Maye	WR	Minnesota	
Tampa Bay Vipers	Ryan Davis	WR	Auburn	
Tampa Bay Vipers	Willie Quinn	WR	Southern	
Tampa Bay Vipers	Colin Thompson	TE	Temple	
Tampa Bay Vipers	DeAndre Goolsby	TE	Florida	
Tampa Bay Vipers	Miguel Machado	OT	Michigan State	
Tampa Bay Vipers	John Yarborough	OG	Richmond	
Tampa Bay Vipers	Zack Golditch	OG	Colorado State	
Tampa Bay Vipers	Bobby Richardson	DE	Indiana	
Tampa Bay Vipers	Giorgio Newberry	DT	Florida State	
Tampa Bay Vipers	Nikita Whitlock	DT	Wake Forest	
Tampa Bay Vipers	Trevon Sanders	DT	Troy	
Tampa Bay Vipers	Ike Spearman	LB	Eastern Michigan	
Tampa Bay Vipers	Terrance Plummer	LB	UCF	
Tampa Bay Vipers	Davante Davis	CB	Texas	
Tampa Bay Vipers	Malik Warner	CB	Wagner	
Tampa Bay Vipers	Shelton Lewis	CB	Florida Atlantic	
Tampa Bay Vipers	John Green	S	UConn	
Tampa Bay Vipers	Robert Priester	S	Wyoming	
Tampa Bay Vipers	Andrew Franks	K	RPI	
Tampa Bay Vipers	Matthew Wright	K	UCF	
Tampa Bay Vipers	Jake Schum	P	Buffalo	
Tampa Bay Vipers	Nick Moore	LS	Georgia	

== Supplemental draft ==
XFL team	Player	Pos.	College	Notes
Dallas Renegades	Austin Walter	RB	Rice	
Dallas Renegades	Floyd Allen	WR	Ole Miss	
Dallas Renegades	Jazz Ferguson	WR	Northwestern State	
Dallas Renegades	Curtis Cothran	DT	Penn State	
Dallas Renegades	Deon Simon	DT	Northwestern State	
Dallas Renegades	Tobenna Okeke	LB	Fresno State	
Dallas Renegades	Jamal Peters	CB	Mississippi State	
Dallas Renegades	Josh Thornton	CB	Southern Utah	
Dallas Renegades	Marwin Evans	S	Utah State	
Dallas Renegades	Ryan Moeller	S	Colorado	
DC Defenders	Malachi Dupre	WR	LSU	
DC Defenders	Tyler Palka	WR	Gannon	
DC Defenders	Eli Rogers	WR	Louisville	
DC Defenders	Donnie Ernsberger	TE	Western Michigan	
DC Defenders	A. T. Hall	OT	Stanford	
DC Defenders	Malcolm Bunche	OG	UCLA	
DC Defenders	Dorian Johnson	OG	Pittsburgh	
DC Defenders	Jesse Aniebonam	DE	Maryland	
DC Defenders	Kenny Bigelow	DT	West Virginia	
DC Defenders	Jay Bromley	DT	Syracuse	
DC Defenders	Kerron Johnson	LB	Coastal Carolina	
DC Defenders	Deion Harris	CB	North Dakota	
DC Defenders	Kamrin Moore	S	Boston College	
Houston Roughnecks	Hunter Sharp	WR	Utah State	
Houston Roughnecks	Sebastian Tretola	OG	Arkansas	
Houston Roughnecks	Tejan Koroma	C	BYU	
Houston Roughnecks	Gabe Wright	DT	Auburn	
Houston Roughnecks	LaTroy Lewis	LB	Tennessee	
Houston Roughnecks	Saivion Smith	CB	Alabama	
Houston Roughnecks	Sergio Castillo	K	West Texas A&M	
Los Angeles Wildcats	Terrell Alex	RB	Texas Southern	
Los Angeles Wildcats	Saeed Blacknall	WR	Penn State	
Los Angeles Wildcats	Bucky Hodges	TE	Virginia Tech	
Los Angeles Wildcats	Toa Lobendahn	OG	USC	
Los Angeles Wildcats	Dwayne Wallace	OT	Kansas	
Los Angeles Wildcats	Austin Flynn	DE	Long Beach City	
Los Angeles Wildcats	Montori Hughes	DT	UT Martin	
Los Angeles Wildcats	Will Smith	LB	Texas Tech	
Los Angeles Wildcats	Jalen Collins	CB	LSU	
Los Angeles Wildcats	Brandon Bryant	S	Mississippi State	
New York Guardians	Damon Sheehy-Guiseppi	WR	Phoenix	
New York Guardians	Keenen Brown	TE	Texas State	
New York Guardians	Garrett Hudson	TE	Richmond	
New York Guardians	Brian Wallace	OT	Arkansas	
New York Guardians	Antonio Morrison	LB	Florida	
New York Guardians	Bryce Jones	CB	Akron	
New York Guardians	A. J. Hendy	S	Maryland	
New York Guardians	Matt McCrane	K	Kansas State	
New York Guardians	Justin Vogel	P	Miami (FL)	
Seattle Dragons	Tyre Brady	WR	Marshall	
Seattle Dragons	Anthony Moten	DT	Miami (FL)	
Seattle Dragons	Godwin Igwebuike	S	Northwestern	
St. Louis BattleHawks	Terrance Williams	WR	Baylor	
St. Louis BattleHawks	Ethan Wolf	TE	Tennessee	
St. Louis BattleHawks	Kevin Bowen	OT	East Central	
St. Louis BattleHawks	Chandler Miller	OG	Tulsa	
St. Louis BattleHawks	Will Clarke	DT	West Virginia	
St. Louis BattleHawks	Stevie Tu'ikolovatu	DT	USC	
St. Louis BattleHawks	Darius Hillary	S	Wisconsin	
St. Louis BattleHawks	Harold Jones-Quartey	S	Findlay	
St. Louis BattleHawks	Marquette King	P	Fort Valley State	
Tampa Bay Vipers	Marcus Murphy	RB	Missouri	
Tampa Bay Vipers	Jawill Davis	WR	Bethune–Cookman	
Tampa Bay Vipers	Tanner McEvoy	WR	Wisconsin	
Tampa Bay Vipers	Jerald Foster	OT	Nebraska	
Tampa Bay Vipers	P. J. Locke	S	Texas	
