= Cameron Clear =

American football player (born 1993)

No. 85
- Position: Tight end

Personal information
- Born: February 25, 1993 (age 33); Memphis, Tennessee U.S.
- Listed height: 6 ft 5 in (1.96 m)
- Listed weight: 273 lb (124 kg)

Career information
- High school: Central (Memphis)
- College: Texas A&M
- NFL draft: 2015: undrafted

Career history
- Pittsburgh Steelers (2015)*; Indianapolis Colts (2016)*; San Antonio Commanders (2019); Seattle Dragons (2020)
- * Offseason or practice squad member only
- Stats at Pro Football Reference

Cameron Michael Clear (born February 25, 1993) is an American former football tight end. He played college football at Texas A&M, and signed with the Pittsburgh Steelers after going undrafted in the 2015 NFL draft. Clear was also a member of the Indianapolis Colts, San Antonio Commanders, and Seattle Dragons.

== Early life ==
During high school, Clear played football and basketball at Central High School in Memphis, Tennessee. As a power forward on his high school basketball team, he averaged 12 points and 4 rebounds a game for a team that ended with a record of 21–9 and finish fourth in the state. On the football team he played tight end and defensive line. For his junior season in 2009, he hauled in a total of 26 receptions, for 412 receiving yards, and 2 touchdown receptions. As a defensive lineman he made 62 tackles and 11 sacks on the season. The following year, he amassed 18 catches, 250 receiving yards, 6 receiving touchdowns at tight end, as well as, 60 tackles and 8 sacks on defense. He finished his senior year ranked as the tenth overall defensive line prospect by Sporting News Top 100 for the class of 2011.

== College career ==
=== Freshman season ===
Coming out of high school, Clear committed to Tennessee. As a true freshman in 2011, he played tight end and special teams. Against Middle Tennessee in week 10 he made his only catch of the season for 4 yards. He received his first start during week 12 against Vanderbilt.

On May 25, 2012, Tennessee head football coach Derek Dooley announced that Clear would be dismissed from Tennessee. This came after he was charged with felony theft for stealing a laptop from a member of the Vol's baseball team. Before he was kicked off the team, he was expected to be the second tight end on the depth chart behind future NFL Player Mychal Rivera.

=== Sophomore season ===
On November 27, 2012, Clear officially committed to play tight end for Texas A&M University. Due to NCAA`s student transfer guidelines, Clear had to sit out his entire sophomore season as well as lose a year of eligibility. Since he wouldn't receive a scholarship until he was eligible, Clear transferred to Arizona Western College for his sophomore year.

=== Junior season ===
After attending Arizona Western College and sitting out his sophomore season, he finally debuted for Texas A&M but ended up having a mediocre season for coach Kevin Sumlin. He finished his junior season with 4 catches, 42 receiving yards, and a single touchdown reception.

=== Senior season ===
The following year, he again had a disappointing season, ending his year with 5 catches and 34 receiving yards. After graduating from Texas A&M with a degree in communications and having no eligibility left, his only option was to declare for the 2015 NFL draft although it was highly unlikely he would be drafted due to his performance during his tenure at A&M.

== Professional career ==
=== 2015 NFL draft ===
Although he was expected to go undrafted, Clear was still invited to perform at the NFL Combine. After the combine, the Pittsburgh Steelers scheduled a pre-draft visit with him and attended his pro day. A lot of scouts were skeptical due to the incident at Tennessee, concern with weight issues, and his lack of playing time throughout his collegiate career.

=== Pittsburgh Steelers ===
As expected, Clear went undrafted in the 2015 NFL draft. On May 2, 2015, Clear announced on his Twitter account that he had been signed as an undrafted free agent by the Pittsburgh Steelers.

Clear was waived by the Steelers on September 15, 2015.

=== Indianapolis Colts ===
On February 16, 2016, Clear signed with the Colts. He was waived on May 2, 2016.

=== San Antonio Commanders ===
On October 26, 2018, Clear signed with the San Antonio Commanders of the Alliance of American Football. The league ceased operations in April 2019.

=== Seattle Dragons ===
In October 2019, Clear was drafted by the Seattle Dragons in the ninth round of the 2020 XFL draft. After missing the first two games of the season with a non-football injury, he was placed on injured reserve on February 18, 2020. He was waived from injured reserve on March 12, 2020.
