= Arthur Miley =

American football player (born 1993)

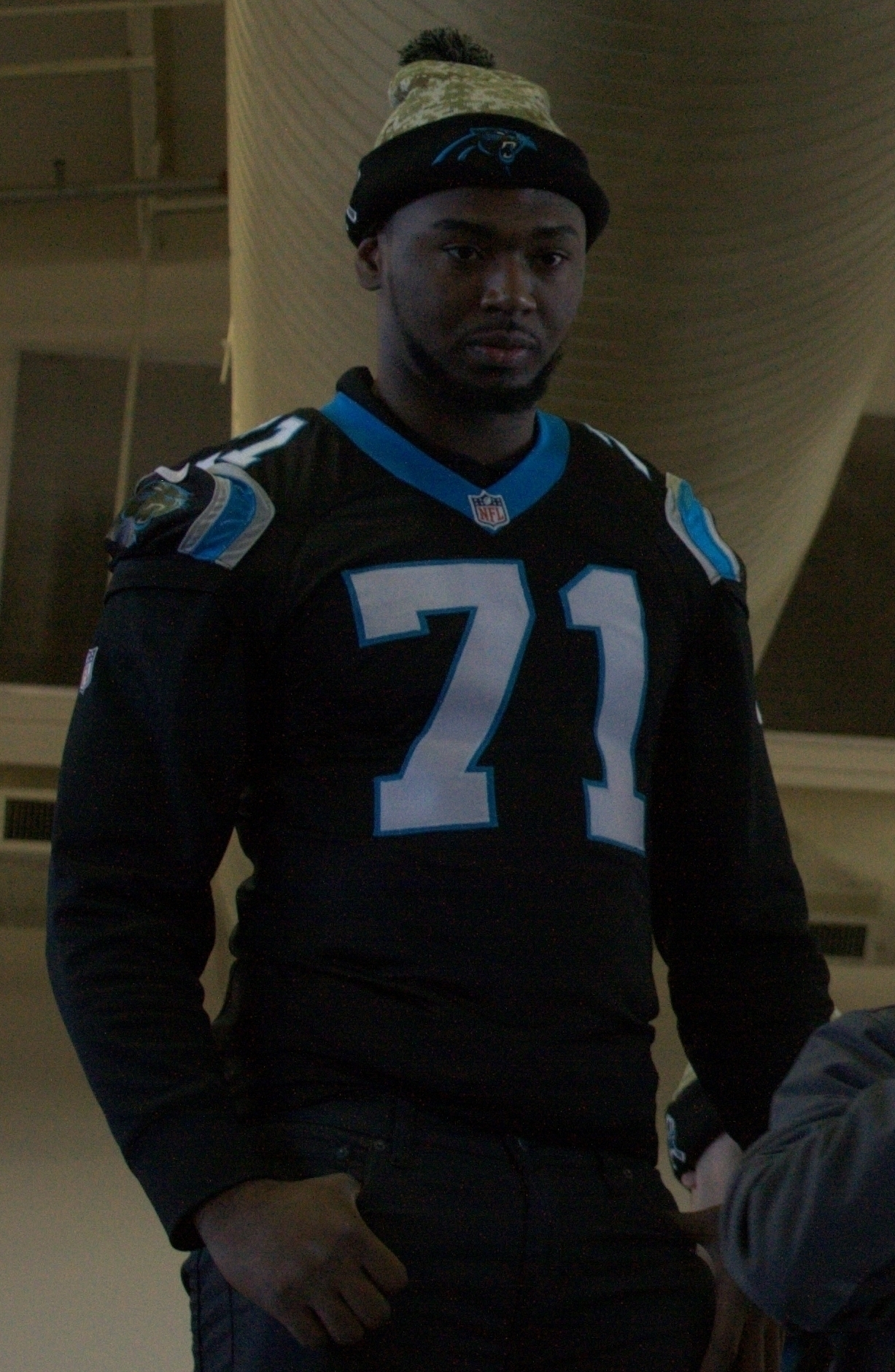
- Miley with the Carolina Panthers in 2015

Profile
- Position: Linebacker

Personal information
- Born: March 3, 1993 (age 33); Mangham, Louisiana, U.S.
- Listed height: 6 ft 6 in (1.98 m)
- Listed weight: 270 lb (122 kg)

Career information
- High school: Mangham (LA)
- College: Southern
- NFL draft: 2015: undrafted

Career history
- Carolina Panthers (2015–2016); Miami Dolphins (2017)*; Carolina Panthers (2017)*; Indianapolis Colts (2017–2018)*; Saskatchewan Roughriders (2018)*; San Antonio Commanders (2019)
- * Offseason or practice squad member only

Awards and highlights
- First-team All-SWAC (2014)
- Stats at Pro Football Reference

Arthur Miley (born March 3, 1993) is an American former football linebacker. He played college football at Southern University for the SU Jaguars. In 2014, Miley was named First-team All-SWAC. He has also spent time with the Miami Dolphins, Carolina Panthers, Indianapolis Colts, Saskatchewan Roughriders, and San Antonio Commanders.

== Professional career ==
=== Carolina Panthers ===
Miley signed with the Carolina Panthers as an undrafted free agent on May 8, 2015. He was placed on injured reserve on September 5, 2015.

On February 7, 2016, Miley's Panthers played in Super Bowl 50. In the game, the Panthers fell to the Denver Broncos by a score of 24–10.

Miley was released by the Panthers on September 3, 2016.

=== Miami Dolphins ===
On January 10, 2017, Miley signed a reserve/future contract with the Miami Dolphins. He was waived on August 7, 2017.

=== Carolina Panthers (second stint) ===
Miley was claimed off waivers by the Panthers on August 8, 2017. He was waived on September 1, 2017.

=== Indianapolis Colts ===
On December 19, 2017, Miley was signed to the Indianapolis Colts' practice squad. He signed a reserve/future contract with the Colts on January 1, 2018. He was waived by the Colts on May 1, 2018.

=== San Antonio Commanders ===
In September 2018, Miley signed with the San Antonio Commanders of the Alliance of American Football. The league ceased operations in April 2019.
