= Andrew McDonald (American football) =

American football player (born 1988)

No. 67, 79, 70, 69
- Position: Tackle

Personal information
- Born: September 8, 1988 (age 38); Indianapolis, Indiana, U.S.
- Listed height: 6 ft 6 in (1.98 m)
- Listed weight: 300 lb (136 kg)

Career information
- High school: Warren Central (Indianapolis)
- College: Indiana
- NFL draft: 2012: undrafted

Career history
- Miami Dolphins (2012–2013)*; Carolina Panthers (2013–2014)*; Seattle Seahawks (2014); Indianapolis Colts (2014); Cleveland Browns (2014–2015); San Diego Chargers (2015)*; Houston Texans (2015); San Antonio Commanders (2019); St. Louis BattleHawks (2020)
- * Offseason or practice squad member only

Career NFL statistics
- Games played: 2
- Stats at Pro Football Reference

Andrew Alexander McDonald (born September 8, 1988) is an American former professional football player who was an offensive tackle in the National Football League (NFL). He played college football for the Indiana Hoosiers and was undrafted before beginning his NFL career with the Miami Dolphins in 2012.

== Professional career ==
Pre-draft measurables
Height	Weight	40-yard dash	10-yard split	20-yard split	20-yard shuttle	Three-cone drill	Vertical jump	Broad jump	Bench press
6 ft 5.5 in (1.97 m)	316 lb (143 kg)	5.25 s	1.81 s	3.00 s	4.80 s	7.88 s	28.5 in (0.72 m)	8 ft 9 in (2.67 m)	23 reps
All values from Pro Day

=== Miami Dolphins ===
After going undrafted, McDonald was invited to participate in the Miami Dolphins' rookie mini-camp. In May 2012, he was officially signed by the team.

=== Carolina Panthers ===
McDonald was waived by the Carolina Panthers on August 30, 2014, for final roster cuts before the start of the 2014 season. He was signed to the team's practice squad the next day.

=== Seattle Seahawks ===
On September 9, 2014, McDonald was signed away from the Panthers practice squad by the Seattle Seahawks.

=== Indianapolis Colts ===
McDonald signed with the Indianapolis Colts on December 2, 2014.

=== Cleveland Browns ===
McDonald was claimed off of waivers by the Cleveland Browns on December 16, 2014. On September 5, 2015, he was waived by the Browns. On the following day, he cleared waivers and was signed to the Browns' practice squad. On October 5, 2015, he was released by the Browns.

=== Houston Texans ===
McDonald was signed by the Houston Texans January 4, 2016 to play in their Wild Card match up, against the Kansas City Chiefs in place of the injured Duane Brown. On September 3, 2016, he was released by the Texans.

=== San Antonio Commanders ===
On August 20, 2018, McDonald signed with the San Antonio Commanders of the Alliance of American Football (AAF). The league ceased operations in April 2019.

=== St. Louis BattleHawks ===
In October 2019, McDonald was selected by the St. Louis BattleHawks in the open phase of the 2020 XFL draft. He had his contract terminated when the league suspended operations on April 10, 2020.

== Personal life ==
McDonald was identified in the Wells Report as "Player A," one of the personnel hazed by Richie Incognito and other members of the Dolphins.

In May 2014, McDonald underwent surgery to treat cancer. He recovered in time to participate in the Panthers 2014 training camp.
