= Joey Mbu =

American football player (born 1993)

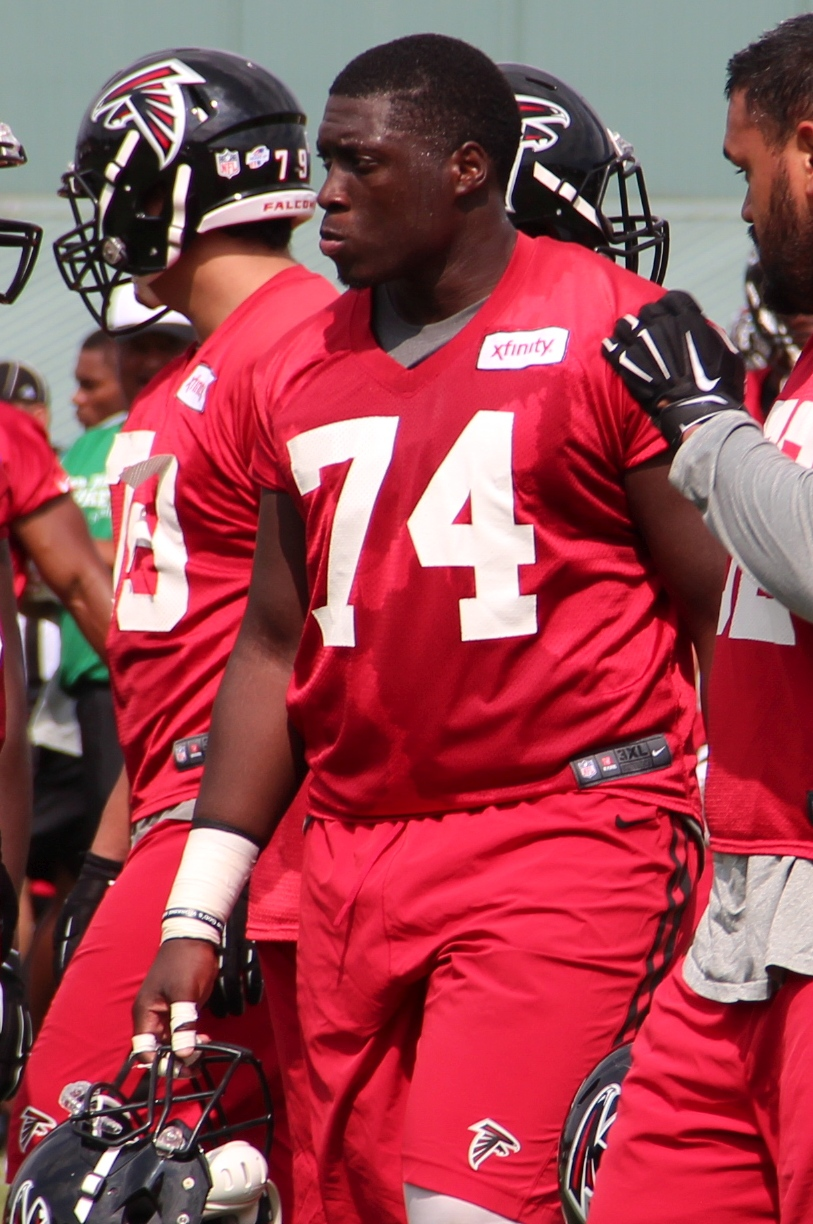
- Mbu with the Atlanta Falcons in 2015

No. 74, 94, 90
- Position: Nose tackle

Personal information
- Born: March 28, 1993 (age 33); Silver Spring, Maryland, U.S.
- Listed height: 6 ft 3 in (1.91 m)
- Listed weight: 323 lb (147 kg)

Career information
- High school: Foster (Richmond, Texas)
- College: Houston
- NFL draft: 2015: undrafted

Career history
- Atlanta Falcons (2015); Washington Redskins (2016–2017)*; Indianapolis Colts (2017); Green Bay Packers (2018)*; San Antonio Commanders (2019); Miami Dolphins (2019)*; New York Guardians (2020)
- * Offseason or practice squad member only

Awards and highlights
- First-team All-AAC (2014)

Career NFL statistics
- Total tackles: 7
- Stats at Pro Football Reference

Joey Mbu (born March 28, 1993) is an American former professional football player who was a nose tackle for the Atlanta Falcons and Indianapolis Colts of the National Football League (NFL). He played college football for the Houston Cougars, and was signed by the Falcons as an undrafted free agent in 2015.

== Early life ==
Mbu played high school football at John and Randolph Foster High School in Richmond, Texas, where he was a three-year starter on the offensive and defensive lines. He recorded 67 tackles, two sacks and two blocked field goals his senior year. He was rated a three-star recruit by rivals.com. Mbu garnered First-team All-District 23-4A recognition at Foster High. He earned First-team All-Area honors in 2009 and 2010 and Second-team honors in 2008. He helped the team advance to the playoffs in 2009 and 2010. Mbu also participated in discus and shot put on the school's track team. He won the discus district championship in 2010 and then advanced to the regional championship.

== College career ==
Mbu played for the Houston Cougars of the University of Houston from 2011 to 2014. He played in twelve games, recording four total tackles, his freshman season in 2011. He played in twelve games, starting eight, for the Cougars in 2012 and accumulated 27 tackles. Mbu started thirteen games in 2013, totaling 29 tackles. He was a captain his senior year in 2014, recording 32 tackles, 2.5 sacks, and one interception. He also earned First-team All-AAC honors his senior season while participating in the East–West Shrine Game and Senior Bowl. Mbu played in 50 games, starting 38, during his college career and recorded 92 tackles, four sacks, eight pass breakups, and two interceptions. He majored in kinesiology.

== Professional career ==
=== Pre-draft ===
Mbu was rated the 19th best defensive tackle in the 2015 NFL draft by NFLDraftScout.com. Lance Zierlein of NFL.com predicted that he would be selected in the seventh round or be a priority free agent. Zierlein also stated that "Mbu's football character and size give him a shot to make an NFL team."

Pre-draft measurables
| Height | Weight | 40-yard dash | 10-yard split | 20-yard split | 20-yard shuttle | Three-cone drill | Vertical jump | Broad jump | Bench press |
|---|---|---|---|---|---|---|---|---|---|
| 6 ft 3 in (1.91 m) | 313 lb (142 kg) | 5.54 s | 1.85 s | 3.15 s | 5.01 s | 8.20 s | 22 1/2 in (0.57 m) | 8 ft 1 in (2.46 m) | 21 reps |
BP from Houston Pro Day, all others from NFL Combine

=== Atlanta Falcons ===
Mbu signed with the Atlanta Falcons on May 6, 2015 after going undrafted in the 2015 NFL draft. He was released by the team on September 5 and signed to the Falcons' practice squad on September 8, 2015. He was promoted to the active roster on December 11, 2015. Mbu played in two games for the Falcons during the 2015 season, totaling one solo tackle and three tackle assists.

On September 3, 2016, Mbu was waived by the Falcons as part of final roster cuts. The Falcons signed him to their practice squad the next day. On September 6, 2016, he was cut from the Falcons' practice squad.

=== Washington Redskins ===
On October 11, 2016, Mbu was signed to the Washington Redskins' practice squad. He signed a futures contract with the Redskins on January 2, 2017. On September 2, 2017, Mbu was waived by the Redskins.

=== Indianapolis Colts ===
On September 4, 2017, Mbu was signed to the Indianapolis Colts' practice squad. He was promoted to the active roster on November 7, 2017. He was waived by the Colts on May 1, 2018.

=== Green Bay Packers ===
On June 11, 2018, Mbu signed with the Green Bay Packers. He was waived on September 1, 2018.

=== San Antonio Commanders ===
In December 2018, Mbu signed with the San Antonio Commanders of the AAF. Although Mbu only recorded 3 tackles in 8 games played, two of those were sacks. Mbu also created quarterback pressures, forced a fumble, knocked down a pass, and recovered a fumble forced by teammate Jayrone Elliott for a defensive touchdown.

=== Miami Dolphins ===
After the AAF suspended football operations, Mbu signed with the Miami Dolphins on April 9, 2019 alongside fellow San Antonion teammate Elliott. He was released during final roster cuts on August 31, 2019.

=== New York Guardians ===
In October 2019, Mbu was selected by the New York Guardians in the second round of the 2020 XFL draft. In 5 games, Mbu managed 9 tackles, a sack, and two passes batted down. He had his contract terminated when the league suspended operations on April 10, 2020.

== NFL career statistics ==
=== Regular season ===
| Season | Team | Games | | Tackles | | | | |
| Season | Team | GP | GS | Total | Solo | Ast | Sck | Int |
|---|---|---|---|---|---|---|---|---|
| 2015 | ATL | 7 | 0 | 3 | 2 | 1 | 0.0 | 0 |
| 2017 | IND | 2 | 0 | 4 | 1 | 3 | 0.0 | 0 |
| Total | | 9 | 0 | 7 | 3 | 4 | 0.0 | 0 |
Source: NFL.com

== Personal life ==
Mbu's step-father, Charles Nzams, is a FIFA soccer scout and has also played for Cameroon national soccer team.
