= Kenneth Farrow (American football) =

American football player (born 1993)

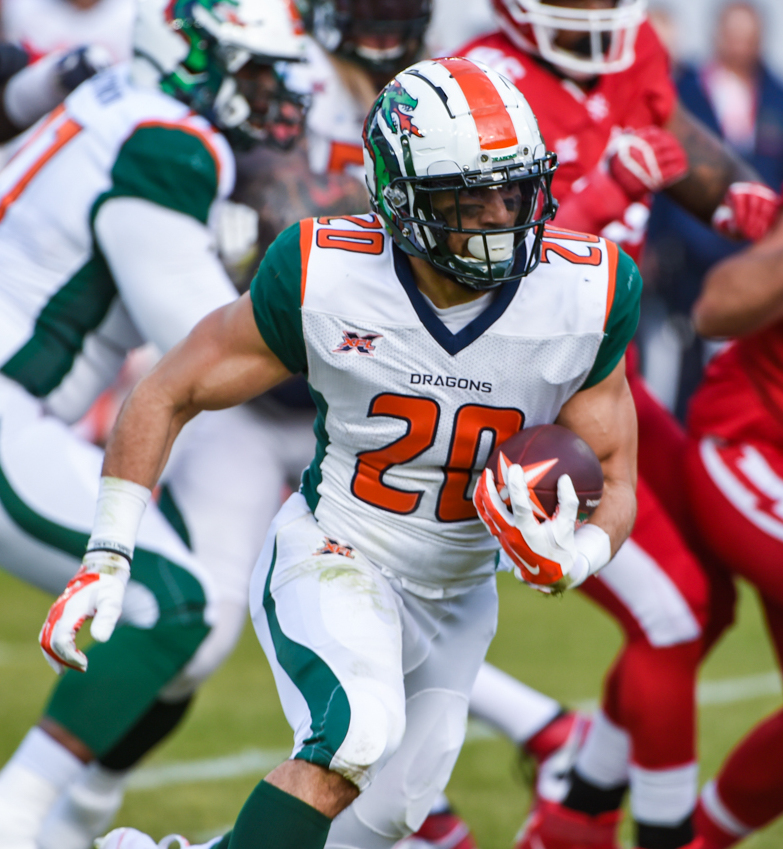
- Farrow with the Seattle Dragons in 2020

No. 27, 20
- Position: Running back

Personal information
- Born: March 7, 1993 (age 33); Irving, Texas, U.S.
- Listed height: 5 ft 9 in (1.75 m)
- Listed weight: 215 lb (98 kg)

Career information
- High school: L. D. Bell (Hurst, Texas)
- College: Houston
- NFL draft: 2016: undrafted

Career history
- San Diego / Los Angeles Chargers (2016–2017); New England Patriots (2018)*; San Antonio Commanders (2019); Miami Dolphins (2019)*; Seattle Dragons (2020); Arlington Renegades (2023)
- * Offseason or practice squad member only

Awards and highlights
- XFL champion (2023)

Career NFL statistics
- Rushing attempts: 60
- Rushing yards: 192
- Receptions: 13
- Receiving yards: 70
- Stats at Pro Football Reference

Kenneth Farrow II (born March 7, 1993) is an American former professional football player who was a running back in the National Football League (NFL). He played college football for the Houston Cougars and signed with the San Diego Chargers as an undrafted free agent in 2016. He currently serves as President of the United Football Players Association.

== Early life ==
Farrow attended and played high school football at L. D. Bell High School.

== College career ==
=== 2011 ===
Farrow began attending the University of Houston in 2011 and subsequently redshirted his first year and did not play.

=== 2012 ===
The following year, he was slated as the backup behind Charles Sims. On October 6, 2012, he carried the ball eight times for 85 yards and scored his first career rushing touchdown against North Texas. On October 27, 2012, he received his first career start against UTEP and finished the 45–35 victory with eight carries for 28 yards. He finished his second season at Houston with 86 carries for 466 rushing yards and two touchdowns while playing in 13 games and starting three of them.

=== 2013 ===
With Sims transferring out to West Virginia, Farrow became the de facto starter to begin the 2013 season. He opened the season rushing for a season-high 97-yards on 20 carries against Southern. The following week, he had nine rushing attempts for 78 rushing yards during a Week 2 victory over Temple. He missed Weeks 3 and 4 due to a lower leg injury but returned during Week 5 and had 15 carries for 33 rushing yards and two touchdowns in a game against Memphis. He finished his sophomore season with 103 rushing attempts for 514 rushing yards and six rushing touchdowns while starting 11 of 13 games he appeared in. Farrow managed to make 24 catches for 113 receiving yards and one touchdown during his third season with Houston.

=== 2014 ===
He began 2014 being voted as a captain for the Houston Cougars and rushing for 21 yards on seven carries in the Cougar's season opening loss to UTSA. The following game, he had managed to rush for a season-high 130 yards on 13 attempts and scored his first rushing touchdown of the season against Grambling State. On September 20, 2014, Farrow carried the ball 14 times for 113 yards and one touchdown in a win over UNLV. On November 1, 2014, he carried the ball a season-high 22 times for 112 rushing yards and a touchdown while also making two receptions for seven yards and his first touchdown reception of the season against USF. During a Week 10 matchup against the Tulsa, he had 21 carries for 116 rushing yards and scored a career-high four rushing touchdowns. The following week, he had 18 rushing attempts for 110 rushing yards and two touchdowns in a 35–9 victory of SMU. The next game at Cincinnati, he had 19 carries for a season-high 143 rushing yards and one touchdown. This marked his third consecutive game with over 100 rushing yards and one touchdown. On January 2, 2015, the Houston Cougars played in the 2015 Armed Forces Bowl against Pittsburgh and Farrow won the MVP award after he carried the ball 22 times for 103 yards and two rushing touchdowns to help his team win, 35–34. He finished his junior year with 186 carries for 1,042 rushing yards and 14 rushing touchdowns while also making 20 catches for 149 receiving yards and a touchdown. He played in all 13 games and started 12 of them. He led the American Conference in rushing yards.

=== 2015 ===
Despite having a strong performance during his junior season, Farrow decided to forgo the 2015 NFL draft and return to Houston for his senior season and was voted a team captain for his third consecutive year. In the Cougar's season opener against Tennessee Tech, Farrow carried the ball 11 times for 49 yards. On October 3, 2015, he had 19 carries for 159 rushing yards and scored two rushing touchdowns in the Cougars' victory over Tulsa. The following game, he only had 11 carries for 40 yards but managed to score three rushing touchdowns to help Houston win 49–38 against SMU. On October 24, 2015, Farrow rushed for a career-high 167 yards on 13 attempts and scored three touchdowns to help Houston get their seventh win of the season against UCF. During a Week 9 contest against Cincinnati, he had 30 rushing attempts for 106-yards and a touchdown. The next game he helped #16 Houston Cougars defeat #25 Memphis after scoring two rushing touchdowns. On November 21, 2015, Houston lost their only game of the season against UConn with Farrow being held without a touchdown after being held to 46 yards on 14 attempts. He would miss the next two games due to an injury but managed to return for #14 Houston's matchup against #9 teamFlorida State in the Peach Bowl. Although he only carried the ball three times for nine yards, Houston still managed to win 38–24 to end their season with a 12–1 record. He finished his last year at Houston with a total of 185 carries for 958 rushing yards and 12 touchdowns while also making 10 catches for 119 receiving yards. During his senior season, he only appeared in 11 games but started all of them.

He finished his five-year career at Houston with 560 carries for 2,980 rushing yards, which was for an average of 5.6 yards per carry, and scored 34 rushing touchdowns. Farrow also made 74 receptions for 546 receiving yards and three receiving touchdowns.

== Professional career ==
=== Pre-draft ===
Coming out of college, Farrow was not a highly touted prospect and was only projected by most analysts to be selected in the sixth or seventh rounds or to be a high-priority free agent after the draft. He was ranked as the 31st best running back out of the 204 available in the draft by NFLDraftScout.com. He did not receive an invitation to the combine but did participate in Houston's annual Pro Day.

Pre-draft measurables
| Height | Weight | 40-yard dash | 10-yard split | 20-yard split | 20-yard shuttle | Three-cone drill | Vertical jump | Broad jump | Bench press |
|---|---|---|---|---|---|---|---|---|---|
| 5 ft 9 4/5 in (1.77 m) | 219 lb (99 kg) | 4.59 s | 1.62 s | 2.72 s | 4.14 s | 6.95 s | 38 in (0.97 m) | 10 ft 2 in (3.10 m) | 23 reps |
All values from Houston's Pro Day

=== San Diego / Los Angeles Chargers ===
After going undrafted in the 2016 NFL draft, Farrow was immediately signed as an undrafted free agent by the San Diego Chargers. He began the season as the third running back on the depth chart after Branden Oliver tore his Achilles tendon during the pre-season. He received his first playing time on September 18, 2016, after backup Danny Woodhead tore his ACL and was placed on injured reserve for the remainder of the season. He finished his professional debut against the Jacksonville Jaguars with four carries for 13 yards. He earned his first starts in Weeks 15 and 16 after an injury to Melvin Gordon. He was placed on injured reserve on December 26, with a shoulder injury.

On September 2, 2017, Farrow was waived/injured by the Chargers and placed on injured reserve.

On April 13, 2018, Farrow was waived by the Chargers.

=== New England Patriots ===
On August 27, 2018, Farrow was signed by the New England Patriots. He was waived by New England on September 1, and was later re-signed to the practice squad. Farrow was released by the Patriots on September 20, but was re-signed again on October 9. He was released by the Patriots once more on November 6.

=== San Antonio Commanders ===
In December 2018, Farrow signed with the San Antonio Commanders of the AAF. During week four of the 2019 AAF season, Farrow recorded 142 yards on 30 attempts (4.7 yards per carry) against the undefeated Birmingham Iron's second-ranked defense to lead San Antonio to a 12–11 win; he was later named AAF Offensive Player of the Week.

=== Miami Dolphins ===
After the AAF suspended football operations, Farrow signed with the Miami Dolphins on April 9, 2019. He was released by Miami during final roster cuts on August 31.

=== Seattle Dragons ===
Farrow was selected by the Seattle Dragons in the 2020 XFL draft. He had his contract terminated when the league suspended operations on April 10, 2020.

=== Arlington Renegades ===
Farrow was selected by the Arlington Renegades in the 2023 XFL draft. He signed with the team on March 3, 2023. He was placed on the team's reserve list on March 22, due to a knee injury, and activated on May 16. On April 21, Farrow announced his retirement from professional football.

== Career statistics ==
=== NFL ===
| Season | Team | Games | | Rushing | | | | | Receiving | | | | | Fumbles | |
| Season | Team | GP | GS | Att | Yds | Avg | Lng | TD | Rec | Yds | Avg | Lng | TD | FUM | Lost |
|---|---|---|---|---|---|---|---|---|---|---|---|---|---|---|---|
| 2016 | San Diego Chargers | 13 | 2 | 60 | 192 | 3.2 | 11 | 0 | 13 | 70 | 5.4 | 16 | 0 | 2 | 1 |

=== College ===
| | | Rushing | | | | | | Receiving | | |
| Year | Team | GP | Att | Yards | Avg | Long | TD | Rec | Yards | TD |
|---|---|---|---|---|---|---|---|---|---|---|
| 2012 | Houston | 12 | 86 | 466 | 5.4 | 48 | 2 | 20 | 165 | 1 |
| 2013 | Houston | 11 | 103 | 514 | 5.0 | 40 | 6 | 24 | 113 | 1 |
| 2014 | Houston | 13 | 186 | 1,042 | 5.6 | 58 | 14 | 20 | 149 | 1 |
| 2015 | Houston | 12 | 185 | 958 | 5.2 | 44 | 12 | 10 | 119 | 0 |
| Career | | 48 | 560 | 2,980 | 5.3 | 58 | 34 | 74 | 546 | 3 |
