= Maea Teuhema =

American gridiron football player (born 1996)

Profile
- Position: Offensive lineman

Personal information
- Born: October 17, 1996 (age 30); Keller, Texas, U.S.
- Listed height: 6 ft 5 in (1.96 m)
- Listed weight: 315 lb (143 kg)

Career information
- High school: Keller (TX)
- College: Southeastern Louisiana
- NFL draft: 2018: undrafted

Career history
- San Antonio Commanders (2019); Dallas Renegades (2020)*; New York Guardians (2020)*; Team 9 (2020)*; New York Guardians (2020); Michigan Panthers (2022); Arlington Renegades (2023); San Antonio Brahmas (2023); BC Lions (2024)*; Houston Roughnecks (2025)*
- * Offseason or practice squad member only

Awards and highlights
- ESPN Freshman All-American (2015)
- Stats at CFL.ca

Tristan Maea Teuhema (born October 17, 1996) is an American professional gridiron football offensive lineman. He played college football for Southeastern Louisiana after being suspended from LSU in 2017. He had stints with the San Antonio Commanders of the Alliance of American Football (AAF); Dallas Renegades, Orlando Guardians, Arlington Renegades, and San Antonio Brahmas of the XFL; and Michigan Panthers of the United States Football League (USFL).

== Early life ==
A native of Keller, Texas, Teuhema attended Keller High School, where he was an All-American offensive lineman. His older brother, Sione Teuhema, was a defensive lineman for Keller. Regarded as a four-star recruit by ESPN, Maea Teuhema was ranked as the No. 2 offensive guard prospect in the class of 2015. Both Sione and Maea Teuhema verbally committed to Texas in May 2013, but decommitted after head coach Mack Brown resigned. In February 2014, both Teuhema brothers committed to Louisiana State.

== College career ==
As a true freshman, Teuhema played in all 12 games and started the last 11 at left guard, as part of an offensive line that helped Leonard Fournette rush for an LSU single-season rushing record of 1,953 yards. As a sophomore, Teuhema split time between both guard spots early in his sophomore campaign before settling in as the starting right tackle for the final six games of the season.

In August 2017, LSU suspended Teuhema for academic reasons, causing him to transfer to Southeastern Louisiana.

== Professional career ==
After going undrafted in the 2018 NFL draft, Teuhama participated in the New Orleans Saints rookie minicamp.

=== San Antonio Commanders ===
On October 26, 2018, Teuhama signed with the San Antonio Commanders of the Alliance of American Football (AAF). After being on the injured reserve list to start the 2019 season, he was promoted to the active roster on March 4. The league ceased operations in April 2019.

=== Dallas Renegades ===
In 2019, Teuhama was drafted in the open phase of the 2020 XFL draft by the Dallas Renegades. He was waived by the Renegades and claimed off waivers by the New York Guardians on January 7, 2020. He was waived during final roster cuts on January 22, 2020. He signed with the Team 9 practice squad during the regular season. He was re-signed by the Guardians on March 9, 2020. He had his contract terminated when the league suspended operations on April 10, 2020.

=== Michigan Panthers ===
On March 10, 2022, Teuhema was drafted by the Michigan Panthers of the United States Football League.

=== Arlington Renegades ===
The Arlington Renegades selected Teuhema in the seventh round of the 2023 XFL Supplemental Draft on January 1, 2023. He was released on February 15, 2023.

=== San Antonio Brahmas ===
Teuhama signed with the San Antonio Brahmas of the XFL on February 21, 2023. He was not part of the roster after the 2024 UFL dispersal draft on January 15, 2024.

=== BC Lions ===
On February 23, 2024, Teuhema was signed by the BC Lions. There, he joined his older brother, Sione, who plays on the Lions' defensive line. On June 2, 2024, the Maea Teuhema was released by the Lions.

=== Houston Roughnecks ===
On July 23, 2024, Teuhema signed with the Houston Roughnecks of the United Football League (UFL). He was released on January 7, 2025.
